= Governance of Kosovo =

The Governance of Kosovo operates in the context of the disputed territory of Kosovo.

The Provisional Institutions of Self-Government (PISG) is defined under United Nations Interim Administration Mission in Kosovo (UNMIK) regulations, the Republic of Kosovo (RoK) government is defined under the 2008 Constitution of Kosovo and operates in most of Kosovo, and the Assembly of the Community of Municipalities of the Autonomous Province of Kosovo and Metohija is the assembly of the association of municipal governments of the Autonomous Province of Kosovo and Metohija that operates in North Kosovo. All the governments operate in the context of a multi-party parliamentary representative democracy. One author put it thus:

… countries such as Serbia, the Russian Federation, Cyprus, Greece, Romania, Slovakia, and Spain, and international organizations, which are 'status-neutral', such as the UN, the OSCE, the Council of Europe, NATO, the EU Rule of Law Mission in Kosovo (EULEX) and the European Commission Liaison Office in Kosovo (ECLO) have not recognized the Republic of Kosovo. According to them the institutions of Kosovo are still the 'Provisional Institutions of Self-Government'.

International civil and security presences are currently operating under auspices of the United Nations Security Council Resolution 1244. Previously this included only the UNMIK but has since expanded to include the European Union Rule of Law Mission in Kosovo (EULEX). In December 2008, EULEX was deployed throughout the territory of Kosovo, assuming responsibilities in the areas of police, customs and the judiciary.

== Status ==
=== UNMIK ===
On 10 June 1999 the United Nations Security Council passed Resolution 1244 placing Kosovo under UN administration. On 25 July 1999 the Special Representative of the Secretary-General for Kosovo Bernard Kouchner issued UNMIK Regulation 1999/1, vesting "all legislative and executive authority with respect to Kosovo, including the administration of the judiciary" in the United Nations Interim Administration Mission in Kosovo (UNMIK) to be exercised by the Special Representative, which came into force 10 June 1999.

==== PISG ====
On 15 May 2001, UNMIK Regulation 2001/9 was issued, establishing the Provisional Institutions of Self-Government (PISG), including the Assembly of Kosovo, President of Kosovo, Executive of Kosovo, and the judicial system. On 13 September 2001, UNMIK Regulation 2001/19 was issued defining the Executive of Kosovo.

=== Republic of Kosovo ===
On 17 February 2008, 109 individual members of the Assembly of Kosovo signed the 2008 Kosovo declaration of independence. On 9 April 2008, a Constitution of Kosovo was adopted by the Assembly of Kosovo in what Serbian Minister for Kosovo Slobodan Samardžić called an "illegal act". On 15 June 2008 the Constitution took effect by its own terms.

=== Assembly of the Community of Municipalities ===
On 28 June 2008, delegates elected in the 2008 Kosovan local elections in 26 municipalities in Kosovo convened an Assembly of the Community of Municipalities of the Autonomous Province of Kosovo and Metohija.

== Republic of Kosovo ==
Legislative power is vested in both the Assembly of Kosovo and the ministers within their competencies. The President of Kosovo is the head of state and represents the "unity of the people". The Executive of Kosovo exercises the executive power and is composed of the Prime Minister of Kosovo as the head of government, the deputy prime ministers, and the ministers of the various ministries. The legal system is composed of an independent judiciary composed of the Supreme Court and subordinate courts, a Constitutional Court, and an independent prosecutorial institution. There also exist multiple independent institutions defined by the Constitution and law, as well as local governments.

=== Assembly ===
The Assembly of Kosovo has 120 members elected for a four-year term. The Assembly includes twenty reserved seats: ten for Kosovar Serbs and ten for non-Serb minorities (e.g., Bosniak, Roma, etc.). The Assembly passes all laws in Kosovo, ratifies international treaties, and appoints the President of Kosovo, Prime Minister, ministers, and justices of all courts, adopts the budget and performs other duties as established by the Constitution. The Parliament can pass a vote of no-confidence on the Government by a majority of the members.

=== President ===
The President of Kosovo is the head of state. The President is elected by the Assembly.

=== Executive ===
The executive, also called the government, is composed of the Prime Minister, the deputy prime ministers as well as various ministers.

=== Judicial system ===
According to the 2008 Constitution, the judicial system is composed of an independent judiciary composed of the Supreme Court and subordinate courts, a Constitutional Court, and an independent prosecutorial institution. The courts are administered by the Kosovo Judicial Council.

On 15 December 2000, UNMIK Regulation 2000/64 was issued allowing for the assignment of international judges, prosecutors, or so called "Regulation 64 Panels", for particular cases. On 6 July 2003, UNMIK Regulation 2003/25 and 2003/26 were issued, enacting the Provisional Criminal Code and Provisional Criminal Procedure Code, replacing the Yugoslav Federal Criminal Code still in effect. On March 13, 2008, the Assembly passed Law 2008/03-L053, the Law on Jurisdiction, Case Selection and Case Allocation of EULEX Judges and Prosecutors in Kosovo, as well as Law 2008/03-L052, the Law on Special Prosecution Office of the Republic of Kosovo. These laws recognize the authority of EULEX judges, prosecutors, and courts to work in tandem with their Kosovan counterparts, which are governed by the Assembly of the EULEX Judges and an Assembly of the EULEX Prosecutors, respectively.
