= 2010 political crisis in Kosovo =

The 2010 political crisis in Kosovo started when the Constitutional Court of Kosovo stated that the President of Kosovo Fatmir Sejdiu was violating the Constitution of Kosovo, because he was both president of the Republic of Kosovo and also leader of the Democratic League of Kosovo (LDK). This resulted in Sejdiu stepping down as president on September 27. A new election was announced for December 12, 2010. Jakup Krasniqi became the acting president of Kosovo until the election.

== Early developments ==
On 9 January 2008, Sejdiu resigned from his position as President of Kosovo to run again in the following elections held the same day. This would allow him to start a completely new term with the inauguration of the new legislature, given that there are no term limits established by the Constitution Framework. He received 68 votes out of 81 needed for his election after a third round of parliamentary vote, when a simple majority of 61 votes is required for the election of the president and regained the position. His opponent, Naim Maloku of the Alliance for the Future of Kosovo (AAK), running with the support of three minor parties, obtained 37 votes in the first round. Sejdiu received one vote less in the second round, while 37 deputies chose Maloku. Sejdiu was elected in the third round of voting later on the same day.

== Stepping down ==
On 27 September 2010, Sejdiu stepped down from the post of president of the Republic of Kosovo. Prior to his resignation, the Constitutional Court of Kosovo stated that Fatmir Sejdiu was violating the Constitution of Kosovo, because he was both president of the Republic of Kosovo and also leader of the Democratic League of Kosovo (LDK).
