= 2008 Kosovan presidential election =

Indirect election for the President of Kosovo under UNMIK (9 January 2008)

- 9 January 2008

120 members of the Assembly of Kosovo 81 (1st & 2nd rounds) or 61 (3rd round) votes needed to win
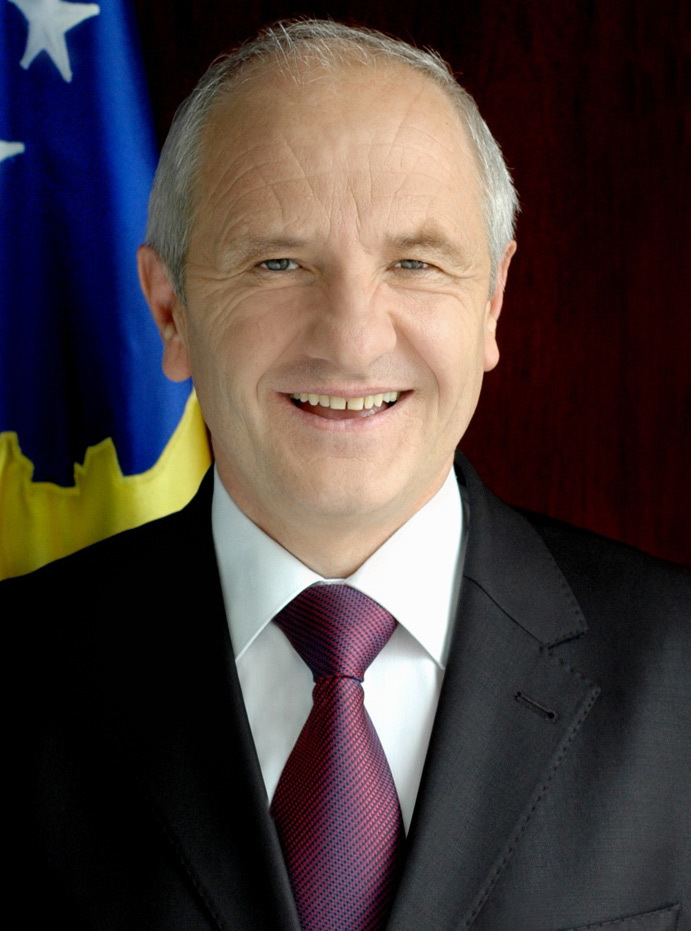

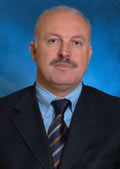
Nominee	Fatmir Sejdiu	Naim Maloku
Party	LDK	AAK
Electoral vote	62, 61, 68	37, 37, 39
Percentage	57.73%	33.05%
- Result on the three ballot (9 January 2008) Sejdiu 68 Maloku 39 Invalids, blanks, abstentions and absents 13
President before election
Fatmir Sejdiu
LDK
President-designate
Fatmir Sejdiu
LDK

The 2008 Kosovan presidential election was an indirect election held by the Assembly of Kosovo on 9 January 2008. The members of the Assembly of Kosovo voted to choose the next President of the Provisional Institutions of Self-Government (PISG). The vote took place during a constitutional crisis. At that time, the current president, Fatmir Sejdiu, held two important jobs at the same time – head of state and a leading role in the government – under the rules of the UNMIK administration in Kosovo. The election was called after the current president gave a technical resignation. This step was meant to "re-legitimise" his position in the eyes of the international community just before independence.

The resignation followed a post-2007 agreement between the LDK and the Democratic Party of Kosovo (PDK). The election took place during the very first session of the newly elected Assembly of Kosovo. It was part of a "package" vote: in the same session, the Assembly of Kosovo chose the president, the prime minister, and the full new government, exactly as the LDK–PDK coalition agreement required.

The election happened only a 39 days before the Assembly of Kosovo declared independence from Serbia on 17 February 2008. It was the fourth and final presidential election carried out under the UNMIK administration and the Constitutional Framework.

Fatmir Sejdiu, the leader of the Democratic League of Kosovo (LDK), won re-election in the third round of voting. He received 68 votes from the parties in his coalition. The opposition parties, including the Democratic Party of Kosovo (PDK) and its allies, boycotted parts of the process. Because of the boycott, the Assembly of Kosovo did not have enough members present to meet the usual quorum rules in the early rounds. This created strong arguments about whether the election was valid. The whole process showed the deep divisions between political parties and the weak institutions in Kosovo's politics after the Kosovo War.

== Background ==
The previous presidential election in February 2006 had chosen Fatmir Sejdiu without any opponent. He was the only candidate put forward by his party and he received 80 votes in the third round after the first two rounds did not produce a winner. After the parliamentary elections on 17 November 2007, the political situation in Kosovo changed a lot. The Democratic Party of Kosovo, led by Hashim Thaçi, became the largest party in the Assembly of Kosovo. The Democratic League of Kosovo finished in second place. After several weeks of talks, the two parties formed a new governing coalition at the end of December 2007 and the beginning of January 2008. As part of that coalition deal, the current president Fatmir Sejdiu gave a technical resignation. The Special Representative of the Secretary-General accepted the resignation. This allowed Fatmir Sejdiu to stand again for a new term and to "re-legitimise" the presidency before the expected declaration of independence. The timing was highly strategic, taking place during the opening session of the newly elected assembly. Both local and international observers viewed this quick election as a necessary procedural move to reinforce the strength of Kosovo's domestic institutions on the eve of statehood.

=== Preceding political crisis ===
After the parliamentary elections on 17 November 2007, Kosovo faced even more political tension. The biggest parties were trying to agree on a new coalition government while international talks about Kosovo's final status remained stuck. The Democratic Party of Kosovo (PDK), led by Hashim Thaçi, won the most seats – 34 out of 120. The Democratic League of Kosovo (LDK), the party of President Fatmir Sejdiu, won 28 seats. These numbers meant the parties had to share power to reach a majority. The talks were difficult because the parties had different ideas about who should become president and how to push for independence. This came after Serbia rejected the UN Special Envoy Martti Ahtisaari's proposal and Russia threatened to use its veto in the middle of 2007. The negotiations at the end of 2007 were full of arguments over who would get the top jobs, including the presidency and the job of prime minister. The parties also had to decide how to deal with the ongoing UNMIK-supervised process under UNMIK. Albanian leaders expected to take steps toward independence on their own while still trying to keep things calm inside Kosovo. The old coalition government, led by Prime Minister Agim Çeku since 2006, had basically ended after the elections. A caretaker administration was left in place while the talks continued. To solve the deadlock and prepare stable leadership before the expected independence declaration, the new Assembly of Kosovo held its first session and put the presidential vote first on 9 January 2008, as the Constitutional Framework required. In the end, the Assembly of Kosovo re-elected Fatmir Sejdiu in the third round with 68 votes from his coalition supporters. This opened the way for Hashim Thaçi to become the new prime minister. The whole sequence showed how closely the choice of president and the formation of the government were linked during Kosovo's transitional period under international administration.

=== Status negotiations and UNMIK administration ===
The United Nations Interim Administration Mission in Kosovo (UNMIK) was created by United Nations Security Council Resolution 1244 on 10 June 1999. This came right after NATO's intervention in the Kosovo War. UNMIK was given the job of running the territory on a temporary basis. It also ended the autonomy Kosovo had before 1999 under the Federal Republic of Yugoslavia and put off any final decision on who owned the territory. The resolution said Serbia's borders remained unchanged but gave UNMIK full power over day-to-day administration, security through the NATO-led Kosovo Force (KFOR), and the political talks that would decide Kosovo's future. UNMIK kept Kosovo in a kind of legal waiting room. It held all legislative and executive power. In 2001 it created the Provisional Institutions of Self-Government (PISG) through the Constitutional Framework. These institutions gave the Albanian majority some limited self-rule, but UNMIK kept the final say on everything important. Talks about Kosovo's final status became much more serious from 2005. They were led by UN Special Envoy Martti Ahtisaari. The talks ended with the Comprehensive Proposal for the Kosovo Status Settlement (known as the Ahtisaari Plan) on 26 March 2007. The plan suggested supervised independence for Kosovo, with strong protections and self-rule for areas where Serbs were the majority, plus new local government arrangements. Serbia completely rejected the plan and said Kosovo should only get back its old level of autonomy inside Serbia. Kosovo's Albanian majority, who made up more than 90 percent of the people, thought the plan did not go far enough toward full independence. Russia, which supported Serbia, used its veto in the United Nations Security Council in July 2007 and stopped any resolution that would have accepted the plan. This left independence without broad international agreement and made the situation inside Kosovo more tense. UNMIK's power started to weaken because many Albanians stopped following its orders, set up their own parallel bodies, and held protests against staying under temporary rule. By the end of 2007 the deadlock had created a serious political crisis in the Assembly of Kosovo. Albanian parties demanded immediate independence while UNMIK could no longer control events. At the same time, violence against Serb communities in their small areas increased. Serbia insisted on keeping full control over Kosovo because of its long history and the fact that only about 5–7 percent of the population was Serb after many left in 1999. These completely opposite views between Serbia and the Albanian majority set the stage for Kosovo to move toward independence without UN approval. The unsolved status question under UNMIK rule, together with failed talks and weaker temporary government, directly led to the need for new leaders who could guide the country toward the independence declaration in early 2008.

=== Constitutional and legal basis for the election ===
The 2008 Kosovan presidential election followed the rules written in the Constitutional Framework for Provisional Self-Government in Kosovo. The United Nations Interim Administration Mission in Kosovo (UNMIK) had published this framework as Regulation No. 2001/9 on 15 May 2001. The framework created the temporary local institutions, including the Assembly of Kosovo. The Assembly of Kosovo was the body that chose the President of Kosovo through a secret ballot. To be nominated, a candidate needed support either from the largest party in the Assembly of Kosovo or from at least 25 members. In the first two rounds of voting a candidate needed two-thirds of all 120 members (81 votes). If no one reached that number after two rounds, the third round needed only a simple majority.

Under the UNMIK administration the President of Kosovo had a mainly ceremonial job. The president stood for the unity of all people in Kosovo, signed laws passed by the Assembly of Kosovo, and carried out official and protocol duties. The president did not have real day-to-day power to run the government. Real executive power stayed with the Special Representative of the Secretary-General (SRSG), who could make decisions on security, foreign affairs, justice, police, the budget, and could cancel any decision made by the local institutions. Kosovo stayed fully under UNMIK control because of United Nations Security Council Resolution 1244 from 1999. The Provisional Institutions of Self-Government (PISG) were set up in 2001, but they had very limited powers. The President of Kosovo's term lasted five years (this had been changed from three years by an earlier amendment). The president's main duties were to represent the people, make sure institutions worked properly, suggest who should be prime minister, and handle some foreign relations – but always in agreement with the SRSG. The rules said the president could not hold any other public office at the same time. Even so, UNMIK kept the highest authority and the SRSG could cancel Assembly of Kosovo decisions or even dissolve the Assembly of Kosovo if they went against Resolution 1244 or the framework. This system made it clear that Kosovo did not have full independence and that the final decision on its status was still open. The same rules had been used in the 2006 election when Fatmir Sejdiu became president after Ibrahim Rugova died. In 2008, however, the election happened while there was a political crisis over Fatmir Sejdiu holding both the presidency and a leading role in the government at the same time. Many people said this broke the spirit of the framework that wanted clear separation of jobs. The Assembly of Kosovo went ahead with the vote without waiting for clear approval from the SRSG while the status talks were still stuck. All of this showed the difficult balance between local voting rules and the international oversight that was still in place.

== Candidates and campaign ==
Only two candidates were officially nominated. This followed the exact rules in Section 9.2.8 of the Constitutional Framework, which said a candidate needed either the support of the largest party group or at least 25 signatures from Assembly of Kosovo members.

- Fatmir Sejdiu (LDK) – the current president – was nominated together by the governing PDK–LDK coalition. His technical resignation and quick re-nomination were written into the coalition deal and were backed by the majority of the new Assembly of Kosovo.
- Naim Maloku (AAK) – a former commander in the Kosovo Liberation Army and a member of parliament – was nominated by the opposition Alliance for the Future of Kosovo (AAK). The AAK collected the necessary 25 signatures from opposition members. Naim Maloku also had the open support of three smaller parties and was the only real challenger to the coalition candidate.

Democratic League of Kosovo
For President
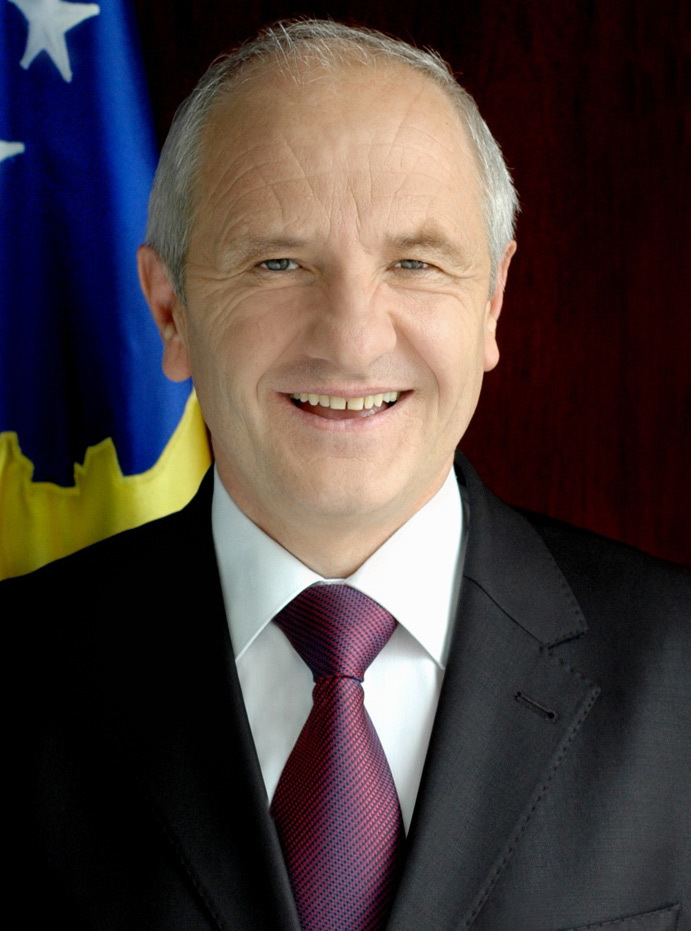
Fatmir Sejdiu
President of the PISG

Democratic Party of Kosovo
For President
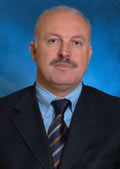
Naim Maloku
Member of Assembly

=== Major candidates and their platforms ===
Fatmir Sejdiu, the current president and chairman of the Democratic League of Kosovo (LDK), was the main candidate chosen by the LDK–PDK governing coalition. His main ideas were to keep the institutions working smoothly, to work closely with the international community on Kosovo's status, and to bring all Albanian parties together so they could follow a calm and democratic path toward independence while respecting the rule of law. Naim Maloku, who was put forward by the Alliance for the Future of Kosovo (AAK) for the opposition parties, called for new leadership that would move faster toward full independence. Many people were unhappy that the status talks had taken so long. Naim Maloku later withdrew his candidacy before the final vote, so Fatmir Sejdiu was re-elected without anyone running against him in the last round. The AAK's views, which Naim Maloku represented, focused on strong self-determination, firm protection of Kosovo's borders, and criticism of the coalition for moving too slowly on independence. The party had grown out of former Kosovo Liberation Army networks. Because the election was indirect and only Assembly of Kosovo members voted, there was no big public campaign. Everything depended on negotiations inside the Assembly of Kosovo instead of detailed public promises.

=== Party alliances and internal divisions ===
The two biggest Albanian parties – the Democratic Party of Kosovo (PDK) and the Democratic League of Kosovo (LDK) – entered the 2008 presidential election while their new coalition was still shaky. Their rivalry went back to the 2004 elections, when the LDK had won the most seats but found it hard to keep stable alliances. This created mistrust with the rising PDK, whose supporters came mostly from former Kosovo Liberation Army members. After the November 2007 elections – where the PDK won 34 seats and the LDK won 28 – the parties talked for weeks before they finally signed a coalition deal on 7 January 2008. The deal let Hashim Thaçi of the PDK become prime minister while the LDK kept the presidency for Fatmir Sejdiu. The agreement was fragile and depended on both sides giving something up so the 120-seat Assembly of Kosovo would not become completely blocked. Smaller parties had real power because the voting rules needed a two-thirds majority (80 votes) in the first two rounds and then a simple majority later. The PDK and LDK together held only 62 seats, so they needed help from parties such as the Alliance for the Future of Kosovo (AAK, 10 seats) or the Democratic League of Dardania (LDD, 11 seats). The LDD was a group that had split from the LDK in 2006 after arguments over leadership; it was led by Nexhat Daci and often asked for policy changes before it would vote. In this case the coalition managed to get enough support for Fatmir Sejdiu on 9 January 2008. Inside the LDK itself there were strong arguments about Fatmir Sejdiu holding both the party leadership and the presidency at the same time. Many members said this put too much power in one person and went against the idea of keeping jobs separate – an idea that would later be written into the 2008 Constitution after independence. These internal fights made the LDK weaker during the coalition talks and pointed to problems that would come later. In 2010 Fatmir Sejdiu had to resign after the Constitutional Court ruled that the two jobs could not be held together. The PDK used these divisions to gain more influence inside the coalition.

=== Key campaign issues ===
The main issue in the whole campaign was how to finish Kosovo's final status. International talks led by Martti Ahtisaari had ended in 2007 without any agreement. Both candidates said Kosovo needed to declare independence on its own to stop living under endless uncertainty caused by UN Security Council Resolution 1244. They promised that real sovereignty would let the government work properly. The candidates also criticised UNMIK for allowing corruption and slow administration. Many people said international officials and local leaders had worked together in shady business deals, especially when selling state companies and running public services. They wanted Albanian-led institutions to replace what they called UNMIK's "bureaucratic monster" so that wrongdoing would stop and people would trust the government again. The campaign also talked about fixing the economy and keeping the country safe. Candidates promised new investments to fight the 75 percent youth unemployment and to repair broken roads, schools, and the electricity system that often failed. They also spoke about the problems in Serb-majority areas where parallel Serbian structures still existed and sometimes caused ethnic tension or violence. All these issues were linked to what would happen after independence, with candidates saying the new country must develop fairly and include everyone without losing control by the Albanian majority.

== Electoral process ==
The President of Kosovo was chosen by an indirect vote of the 120-member Assembly of Kosovo and not by the people voting directly. This system came from the temporary self-government rules under UNMIK administration. A candidate needed either the backing of the largest party group or at least 25 signatures from members. The voting had up to three rounds:

- First and second rounds: two-thirds majority of all 120 members (81 votes required).
- Third round: simple majority of all 120 members (61 votes required).

One observer from each party group was allowed to watch the ballot box and the counting so everything stayed transparent; the OSCE said this was a good practice.

=== Assembly voting procedure ===
The election was carried out on 9 January 2008 during the very first session of the newly formed assembly. On that day, 119 out of the 120 elected members were officially present in the building. However, the actual participation in the chamber reflected deep ethnic divisions; most Serb representatives chose to stay away from the session as part of a wider boycott.

Following the rules set out in Chapter 9.2.8 of the Constitutional Framework, the assembly proceeded with the multi-round vote. During the first and second ballots, Fatmir Sejdiu was unable to reach the necessary 81-vote threshold. This was largely because several opposition members decided to abstain, citing disagreements over the coalition deals that followed the November 2007 elections. Since no winner emerged, the process moved to a third and final round. In this last ballot, Sejdiu successfully secured the presidency by receiving 68 votes. Although some members remained inactive, this total was more than enough to meet the simple majority requirement of 61 votes.

=== Conduct and observed irregularities ===
No full international election observation mission from the OSCE or any other group watched the vote, because UNMIK and the international community were focused on the final status talks rather than on this internal Assembly of Kosovo procedure. The OSCE Mission in Kosovo kept a general eye on the Assembly of Kosovo's work and wrote reports without recording any major problems beyond normal political disagreement. In the early rounds some opposition members stayed away or abstained because they disagreed with the timing and the candidates, but the Assembly of Kosovo still had enough people to continue. Fatmir Sejdiu won the third round with 68 votes from the members who were present. Reports at the time said there was no evidence of ballot stuffing, pressure on voters, or any other cheating in this particular vote. This made the 2008 election different from some later Kosovo elections that did have documented problems.

=== Voter turnout and participation ===
The Assembly of Kosovo that chose the president had 120 seats. Ten of those seats were kept for ethnic Serb representatives. After the November 2007 parliamentary elections, however, those 10 Serb seats stayed empty because the Kosovo Serb community boycotted the vote almost completely – fewer than 1 percent of eligible Serb voters took part. They preferred their own parallel institutions supported by Belgrade. This left the Assembly of Kosovo made up almost entirely of ethnic Albanian members – around 100 in total – who represented more than 80 percent of the people who actually sat in the chamber. The presidential voting therefore involved only these Albanian-majority deputies, who followed the coalition agreements to re-elect Fatmir Sejdiu. The Serb boycott was not changed by the election rules and it made the ethnic divide even clearer. Parallel Serb bodies continued to work outside the Kosovo system. This limited the claim that the election spoke for all people in Kosovo. The low participation by minorities showed the big problems in creating a government that included everyone while the final status was still not settled.

== Results ==
Fatmir Sejdiu was re-elected in the third round with 68 votes, which was more than the 61 votes he needed. Naim Maloku received 39 votes. No separate "against" votes were recorded; only invalid ballots were counted. The OSCE confirmed that the whole procedure followed the Constitutional Framework exactly.

Results of the 2008 Kosovan presidential election
Candidate	Party	First round		Second round		Third round	
Candidate	Party	Votes	%	Votes	%	Votes	%
Fatmir Sejdiu	LDK	62	53.91%	61	53.04%	68	57.63%
Naim Maloku	AAK	37	32.17%	37	32.17%	39	33.05%
Invalid ballots		16	13.91%	17	14.78%	11	9.32%
Required majority		81 votes		81 votes		61 votes	
Total ballots cast		115		115		118	
119 Members of the Assembly present (out of 120)

The 2008 Kosovan presidential election needed three ballots in the 120-seat Assembly of Kosovo. The first two ballots required at least 80 votes (two-thirds). The third ballot needed only a simple majority. In the first ballot Fatmir Sejdiu received 62 votes and Naim Maloku received 37 votes, with 16 invalid ballots out of 115 cast; neither reached the required number. In the second ballot Fatmir Sejdiu had 61 votes and Naim Maloku again had 37, with 17 invalid ballots out of 115 cast; the two-thirds majority was still not reached. In the third ballot Fatmir Sejdiu won with 68 votes against Naim Maloku's 39 – a difference of 29 votes – with 11 invalid ballots out of 118 cast. This result was narrower than Fatmir Sejdiu's 2006 victory, when he had received 80 votes in the deciding round after Ibrahim Rugova died. The 2008 numbers showed how fragile the new coalition was after the 2007 parliamentary elections; even with LDK support Fatmir Sejdiu could not reach 80 votes in the first two rounds.

=== Confirmation and inauguration ===
Following the confirmation of the results on 9 January, Fatmir Sejdiu immediately began his second term. The election was recognized by UNMIK, which, despite maintaining supreme authority under United Nations Security Council Resolution 1244, did not object to the procedure. Notably, the Assembly had amended regulations just prior to the vote to extend the presidential term from three to five years, aligning the office with the upcoming constitutional changes.

Politically, the re-election was a pragmatic triumph for the LDK, though it required a significant compromise with the PDK. In exchange for supporting Sejdiu, the PDK secured the prime ministership for Hashim Thaçi. While LDK supporters celebrated the continuity of leadership, media reports suggested a degree of public skepticism regarding the strength of a coalition born from such intense rivalry. Nevertheless, the resolution of the presidential deadlock was seen as a necessary step to stabilize the government ahead of the planned declaration of independence.

=== Immediate political reactions ===
When Fatmir Sejdiu was re-elected president on 9 January 2008 with 68 votes in the third round, his own party, the Democratic League of Kosovo (LDK), celebrated the result as proof that their leadership was right during the arguments about who could hold two jobs at once. The Democratic Party of Kosovo (PDK), which had earlier criticised Fatmir Sejdiu for holding both offices, voted for him anyway because of the coalition deal that also made Hashim Thaçi prime minister. This was a practical but not enthusiastic agreement so the government could keep working. Right after the vote, coalition leaders called for the new cabinet to be formed quickly so the country would be ready for independence and could handle security and other urgent tasks. Newspapers wrote that people felt some relief that the deadlock was over, but they still worried about how strong the coalition really was and whether the election had given a clear enough mandate, because it had needed compromise between rival parties in a divided Assembly of Kosovo.

== Aftermath ==
Right after the election Fatmir Sejdiu named Hashim Thaçi (PDK) as the new Prime Minister. In the same session the Assembly of Kosovo elected the full new government. In his acceptance speech President Fatmir Sejdiu said the vote was "a step toward independence" and that "independent Kosovo ... will be fully devoted to development and cooperation with all countries in the region." The prime minister-designate Hashim Thaçi told the members: "Our aim is to make Kosovo independent in the first part of this year ... we will make our dream and our right come true soon." Hashim Thaçi was elected prime minister with 85 votes in favour and 22 against. This presidential election was the last one held under the old UNMIK/PISG system. It gave the local institutions more legitimacy just before the declaration of independence.

=== Government stability post-election ===
After Fatmir Sejdiu's re-election on 9 January 2008 the new PDK–LDK coalition government under Prime Minister Hashim Thaçi continued to work without any sudden collapses or ministers leaving. The coalition agreement from 7 January had divided the ministries: seven to the PDK, five to the LDK, and three to minority representatives. The government focused on passing new laws that would help the country move toward full independence and meet international standards, including rules to protect minorities and to give more power to local governments. Even though old rivalries between the PDK and LDK remained, they did not cause immediate problems. The Assembly of Kosovo held regular meetings and about 80 of the 120 members took part, even with the Serb boycott. This allowed important laws to pass without losing the required number of members. On 9 April 2008 the Assembly of Kosovo approved Kosovo's new Constitution – a document with 111 articles that followed international rules on multi-ethnic government. The Constitution came into force on 15 June 2008 after the president signed it. This quick work showed the coalition could hold together in the short term, although later tensions appeared by the end of 2009.

=== Connection to independence declaration ===
Fatmir Sejdiu's re-election on 9 January 2008, even though some opposition members boycotted, gave Kosovo the leadership it needed while the UN-mediated status talks had completely failed at the end of 2007. The process proved that the main parties could negotiate and work together, which was exactly the kind of unity needed for the declaration of independence. As president, Fatmir Sejdiu helped bring the Albanian political leaders together so they could agree on the independence plan. This built on the 2007 coalition understanding between the LDK and PDK that both parties wanted sovereignty after Serbia and Russia rejected the Ahtisaari Plan. The election therefore created steady leadership for foreign relations and for preparing people inside the country, so the vote was seen not as a failure but as the first step toward the unified decision that led to independence.

=== Long-term effects on Kosovan institutions ===
The way the 2008 presidential election was held – by the Assembly of Kosovo during the move toward independence – set a pattern that was later written into Article 86 of the 2008 Constitution. That article says a candidate needs two-thirds support in the first ballots and that the Assembly of Kosovo must be dissolved if no one wins a simple majority after three rounds. This rule, shaped by the 2008 vote, created a system where the President of Kosovo is chosen through bargaining among parties. It also led to many later Assemblies failing to finish their full term and having to call new elections. The 2008 process showed the weaknesses of choosing leaders only through the Assembly of Kosovo: decisions often depend on private deals between party leaders rather than on the direct will of the voters. Many people criticised this for making the government less directly answerable to ordinary citizens in a new country. After 2008 this pattern repeated and caused repeated crises. The election also showed continuing problems with including ethnic minorities. Kosovo Serbs had largely boycotted the 2007 Assembly elections that created the body which chose the president, so almost no Serb deputies took part. Even though the rules kept 10 seats for Serbs, the boycott meant their voice was missing. This pattern continued in later years and left Serb-majority areas with their own parallel structures. As a result the presidency was seen as less legitimate by some groups and ethnic divisions in decision-making stayed strong.

== Controversies ==
=== Disputes over election timing and legitimacy ===
The Assembly of Kosovo held the presidential election on 9 January 2008 even though the normal timetable under the UNMIK framework would not have required a vote that year. The previous election had been in 2006 and terms were usually three years. The early vote was arranged because the political parties wanted to have a president in place before the planned independence declaration on 17 February. Fatmir Sejdiu won in the third round with 68 votes, which was enough for the simple majority of 61 out of 120. Some opposition voices inside Kosovo said the timing was wrong and that the coalition was simply trying to keep control of the top jobs before independence. The vote also happened while the opposition PDK and its allies boycotted, which meant the early rounds did not have enough members present. Critics said this avoided the normal need for wider agreement. After the election, debates continued about Fatmir Sejdiu still leading his party while he was president. The new 2008 Constitution, which started on 15 June, clearly said in Article 88 that the president could not hold a party leadership job. Although the election happened before the Constitution, the Constitutional Court later ruled in 2010 that the two jobs could not be combined, and Fatmir Sejdiu resigned. Opponents then used that ruling to argue that the 2008 election had never been fully legitimate because the dual role had weakened the idea of a neutral president during the move to independence.

=== Serbian opposition and territorial claims ===
The government of Serbia, led by President Boris Tadić, completely rejected the 2008 Kosovan presidential election. Belgrade said the vote was illegal because it was held by temporary institutions that had no right to act under United Nations Security Council Resolution 1244 from 1999. That resolution clearly says Serbia's territorial integrity and sovereignty over Kosovo remain unchanged and that Kosovo is an autonomous province under temporary UNMIK administration. Serbia told the United Nations Security Council that the election was part of a plan for unilateral separation and that it broke the rules that required all sides to negotiate the final status. Belgrade argued that the vote pushed Kosovo toward independence without any agreement and therefore damaged the chance for Serbs and Albanians to live together as the resolution required. Serbia based its claim on history, law, and the fact that Kosovo contained important Serbian Orthodox monasteries and areas in the north (such as Mitrovica) where Serbs formed the majority. The Tadić government warned that accepting such elections would weaken the United Nations and could encourage similar breakaway movements in other places.

=== International legal critiques ===
Some legal experts have asked whether UNMIK had the right to supervise the 2008 presidential election when Kosovo's final status was still undecided. They say the mission went beyond its temporary powers that were given by United Nations Security Council Resolution 1244 in 1999. That resolution was meant to give Kosovo substantial autonomy inside the Federal Republic of Yugoslavia (later Serbia) while it kept Serbia's sovereignty and borders unchanged until a negotiated settlement was reached. Critics argue that by allowing the election of institutions that then acted like a sovereign government – especially right before the independence declaration – UNMIK broke the spirit of the resolution. The resolution had always expected a final agreement through talks, not one-sided steps. Other experts point out that the timing of the election, coming straight after the 2007 parliamentary vote and right before the 17 February 2008 independence declaration, was an example of unilateral action that usual international law does not allow without the parent state's agreement or very special reasons. The International Court of Justice gave an advisory opinion in 2010 saying that the declaration of independence itself did not break general international law, but the Court deliberately did not look at whether the earlier steps, including the presidential election, followed Resolution 1244. Some scholars believe the Court's silence on those earlier actions still allowed a chain of events that slowly took away Serbia's sovereignty without proper legal approval. These critics say that letting temporary institutions hold elections that changed the political facts on the ground went against the normal rule that territorial status should only change through agreement.

== International reactions ==
The United Nations Interim Administration Mission in Kosovo (UNMIK) helped organise the indirect presidential election on 9 January 2008. Through its OSCE part, which deals with building institutions and democracy, UNMIK watched the Assembly of Kosovo's first session and reported that everything went smoothly and followed the rules for provisional institutions under United Nations Security Council Resolution 1244. UNMIK stayed neutral and treated the election as an internal matter for the temporary institutions. At the same time it had warned in earlier reports that leaving Kosovo's status undecided for too long was dangerous and could increase ethnic tension and keep minorities away from voting.

- United Nations did not officially condemn the election. This showed the deep split among its members: Western countries wanted the provisional institutions in Kosovo to keep working normally, while Russia and countries that agreed with Serbia said any step that looked like a final decision on status was wrong.
- European Union gave careful support to the election. European Union officials said it proved Kosovo's institutions were becoming more mature and they asked that minorities be included. Most of the watching was done by OSCE teams. However, the European Union also said the status talks under the Ahtisaari Plan should continue and that the election should not replace real negotiations. Inside the European Union some countries wanted to strengthen local democracy to avoid chaos, while others worried that keeping the old situation forever was no longer possible.

Countries that later recognised Kosovo's independence (more than 100 by 2024) generally saw the 2008 presidential election as a normal democratic step that helped the institutions get ready for independence on 17 February. These included:

- United States supported the political process in Kosovo as part of its wider backing for a supervised move toward sovereignty. It described Fatmir Sejdiu's re-election as a sign of good local leadership while the status talks continued.
- United Kingdom viewed the election as a constructive move towards resolving Kosovo's final status through democratic means. British officials supported the establishment of stable leadership as a necessary step before the formal declaration of independence.
- France welcomed the election results, seeing the vote as an important part of strengthening Kosovo's local administration. The French government supported the democratic process as a way to ensure regional stability during the transition period.
- Germany recognized the presidential vote as a key procedural step that demonstrated the maturity of Kosovo's political institutions. Along with other European partners, Germany backed the election as a means to reach a lasting and democratic solution for the territory.

On the other side, countries that did not recognise Kosovo (about 90 UN members) said the election had no legal value inside Serbia's territory and was only a step toward illegal separation. These included:

- Serbia said Kosovo was still its autonomous province and called the vote unconstitutional. It refused to accept Fatmir Sejdiu as president or any institutions created by the vote, saying everything broke United Nations Security Council Resolution 1244. On 16 January 2008 Serbian President Boris Tadić spoke to the Council and called the election part of a plan for unilateral independence. He asked for new talks so Serbia's sovereignty under United Nations Security Council Resolution 1244 could be protected. The meeting showed that the Council could not agree on any action to stop the process.
- Russia gave the same message and warned that such moves threatened peace and international law. Its Foreign Minister Sergey Lavrov said one-sided steps were dangerous for Europe.
- China also opposed the election because it believed in keeping borders unchanged. It supported only negotiated solutions through the United Nations and saw the vote as ignoring Serbia's rights.

This split appeared immediately: by the end of February 2008 only about 15 countries had recognised Kosovo.

=== Broader implications for self-determination debates ===
The 2008 Kosovan presidential election became an important example of building democratic institutions while the question of who owns the territory was still argued over. By choosing Fatmir Sejdiu through the Assembly of Kosovo, the Albanian majority showed it could create its own government without waiting for Serbia's agreement. This challenged the usual international rule after the Second World War that borders should not be changed by force or one-sided action (UN Charter Article 2). In the situation after Yugoslavia broke apart, the election raised questions about whether old administrative borders should stay the same (the principle called uti possidetis juris) or whether a group that had suffered in war had the right to break away for its own protection. Serbia said the election broke its rights under United Nations Security Council Resolution 1244. Countries that did not recognise Kosovo, such as Russia and Spain, warned that allowing such elections could encourage other groups in places like Catalonia or Crimea to do the same thing. The International Court of Justice's 2010 opinion said the declaration itself did not break general international law, but it did not decide whether the earlier election followed United Nations Security Council Resolution 1244. Some experts from non-Western countries say the whole process showed the danger of letting temporary administrations slowly take away a parent state's control without proper agreement. Others answer that Serbia's refusal of the Ahtisaari Plan proved talks could not succeed, and that the majority had to act on its own after years of waiting. In the end the election helped change the way people talk about self-determination: it showed that when big international talks fail, a local majority that is backed by earlier humanitarian action can create working institutions, even if only about half the world's countries recognise them. At the same time it left some frozen conflicts and parallel structures that still affect Kosovo today.
