= Kosovo Judicial Council =

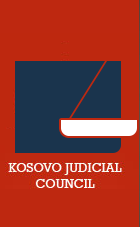
Kosovo Judicial Council Logo

The Kosovo Judicial Council (Albanian: Këshilli Gjyqësor i Kosovës) (KJC) is the national council of the judiciary of Kosovo. It is the highest oversight body tasked with ensuring the independence and impartiality of the judicial system, and the administration of justice in Kosovo, reflecting the multi-ethnic nature of Kosovo as well as the internationally recognized principles of human rights and gender equality.

== Responsibilities ==
According to the Constitution of Kosovo, the council is responsible for selecting and proposing judges for appointment, as well as for elaborating policies for the overall management, administration, and reform of the judicial system and all courts within it. It manages the elaboration and implementation of the budget of the judiciary, and the establishment of new courts and court branches.

== Appointment of judges ==
The Kosovo Judicial Council is responsible for recruiting and proposing candidates for appointment and reappointment to judicial office. The Kosovo Judicial Council is also responsible for transfer and disciplinary proceedings of judges.

Proposals for appointments of judges must be made on the basis of an open appointment process, on the basis of the merit of the candidates, and the proposals should reflect principles of gender equality and the ethnic composition of the territorial jurisdiction of the respective court. All candidates must fulfill the selection criteria provided by law. The council is responsible for conducting judicial inspections, judicial administration, developing court rules in accordance with the law, hiring and supervising court administrators, developing and overseeing the budget of the judiciary, determining the number of judges in each jurisdiction and making recommendations for the establishment of new courts.

== Composition ==
The Kosovo Judicial Council is composed of 13 members, all of whom should possess relevant professional qualifications and expertise. Members are elected for a term of five years and are chosen via the following procedure:

- five members are judges elected by the members of the judiciary
- four members are elected by deputies of the Assembly holding seats attributed during the general distribution of seats. At least two of the four must be judges and one must be a member of the Kosovo Chamber of Advocates.
- two members are elected by the deputies of the Assembly holding reserved or guaranteed seats for the Kosovo Serb community and at least one of the two must be a judge;
- two members are elected by the deputies of the Assembly holding reserved or guaranteed seats for other communities and at least one of the two must be a judge.
- Incompatibilities with membership on the Kosovo Judicial Council are regulated

by law.

The Kosovo Judicial Council elects from its members a chair and vice-chair, each for a term of three years. Election to these offices does not extend the mandate of the members of the Kosovo Judicial Council.

The Chair of the Kosovo Judicial Council addresses the Assembly of the Republic of Kosovo at least once a year regarding the judicial system.

== See also ==
- Judiciary of Kosovo
- Constitution of Kosovo
- Constitutional Court of Kosovo
