= Vila Biljana =

Complex of state villas in Ohrid, North Macedonia

Coordinates: 41°05′18″N 20°47′50″E

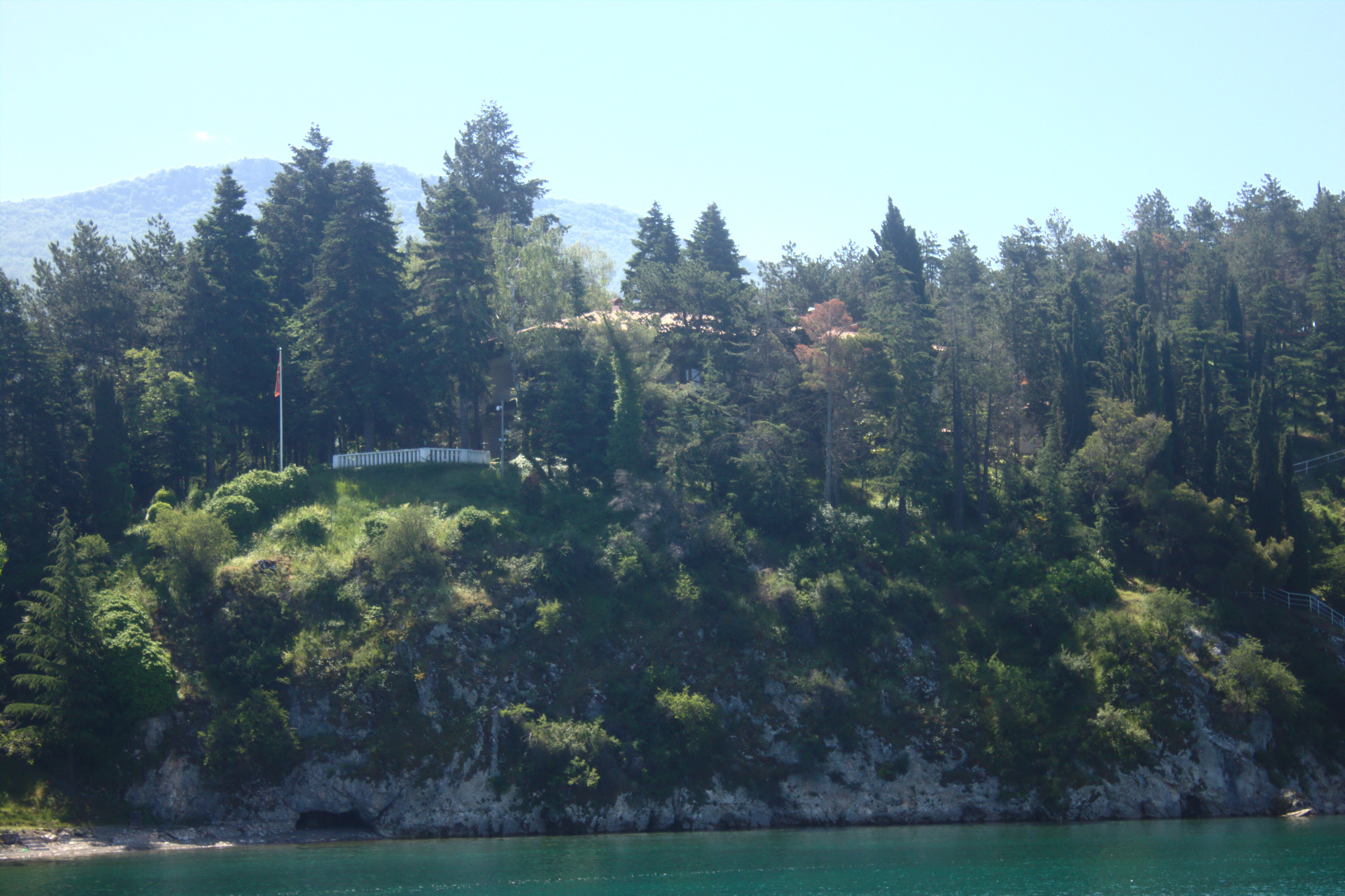
Former Tito's villa in the town of Ohrid in southern northern Macedonia

Vila Biljana is a complex of state villas in Ohrid, North Macedonia. The villa complex includes the villa of the president of North Macedonia, the villa of the prime minister, and the villa of the ministry of police and several villas of public administration. In the communist period, the complex was owned by Josip Broz Tito but is now owned by the government of North Macedonia. In the summer period the villas are used for the vacations of Macedonian statesmen. The villas have also been visited by many world statesmen like Ban Ki-moon, Leonid Kuchma, Slobodan Milosevic, Sergey Lavrov, Fatmir Sejdiu, José Manuel Barroso, Bujar Nishani, Václav Klaus, Paul Kagame and many others.
