= Pakashticë =

Pakashticë Pakaštica
- Village
- Location in Kosovo
- Location: Kosovo
- District: Pristina
- Municipality: Podujevë
- Elevation: 608 m (1,995 ft)

Population (2024)
  - Total: 625
- Time zone: UTC+1 (CET)
  - Summer (DST): UTC+2 (CEST)

Pakashticë (Serbian: Пакаштица, Pakaštica) is a village in north-eastern Kosovo, in the north of the municipality of Podujevo.

It is the birthplace of the former President of Kosovo, Fatmir Sejdiu.
