= Fatmir Sejdiu =

President of Kosovo from 2006 to 2010

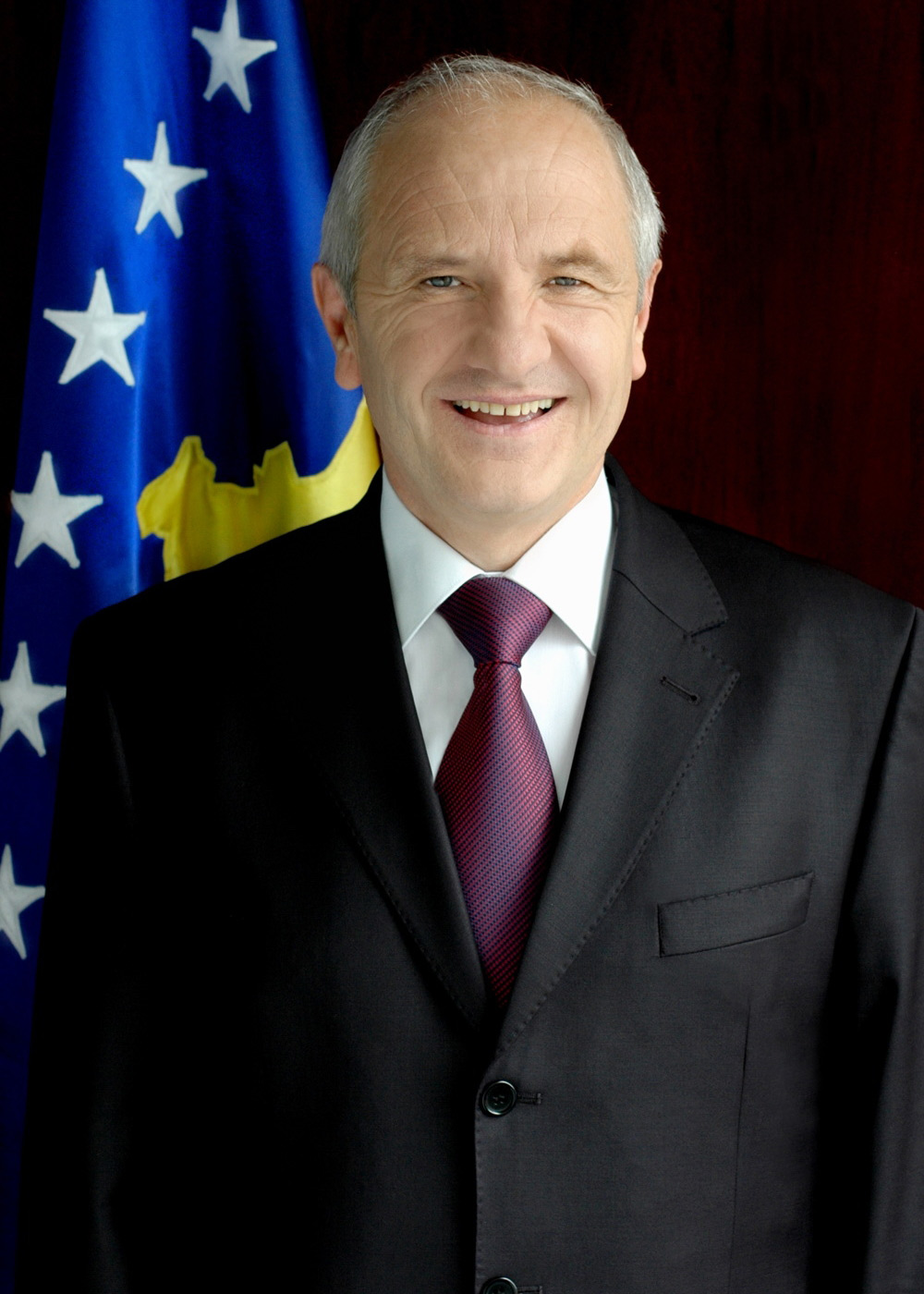
- Official portrait, 2008

President of Kosovo
- In office 10 February 2006 – 27 September 2010
- Prime Minister: Bajram Kosumi; Agim Çeku; Hashim Thaçi
- Preceded by: Nexhat Daci (Acting)
- Succeeded by: Jakup Krasniqi (Acting)

Leader of the Democratic League
- In office 9 December 2006 – 7 November 2010
- Preceded by: Ibrahim Rugova
- Succeeded by: Isa Mustafa

Personal details
- Born: 23 October 1951 (age 74) Pakashticë, Podujevo, FPR Yugoslavia (now Kosovo)
- Party: Democratic League
- Spouse: Nezafete Sejdiu
- Education: University of Pristina

Fatmir Sejdiu (born 23 October 1951) is a Kosovan politician. He was the leader of the Democratic League of Kosovo (LDK) and was President of Kosovo.

== Early life and education ==
Fatmir Sejdiu was born on 23 October 1951, in the small village of Pakashticë, Podujevo, FPR Yugoslavia. He was the first child of Nexhmi Sejdiu and Miradije Shala-Sejdiu.

He finished the primary school and high school in Podujevë.

He graduated from the Faculty of Law, the University of Pristina, in 1974, where he also completed his postgraduate studies and earned his PhD degree. He attended studies in France (University of Paris II Panthéon-Assas, 1984, the Section of History of the Institutions of Economics, Philosophy and Sociology of Law and History of Political Theories), then in the United States (the Arizona State University), and has had short study visits at other universities.

He has published a number of works in the field of the legal, historical, and legal-constitutional studies and other areas. Sejdiu has been a professor at the Faculty of Law since 1975, and as of lately at the Faculty of Political Sciences at the University of Prishtina as well.

He speaks Albanian, English, French, Serbian and Macedonian.

== Political career ==
Seal of the president of Kosovo

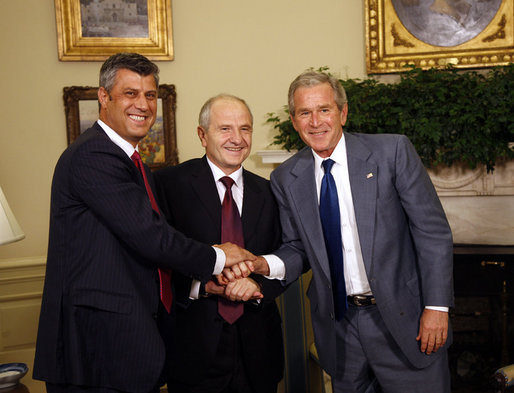
President of US George W. Bush shakes hands with Kosovo President Fatmir Sejdiu (center) and Kosovo Prime Minister Hashim Thaçi (left) during a meeting in the White House on 21 July 2008, after Kosovo declared independence.

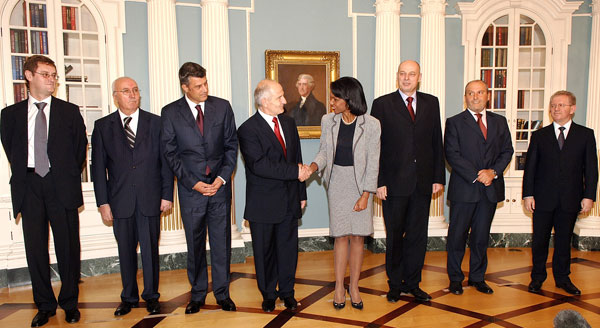
Fatmir Sejdiu (center left) with members of the Kosovo Unity Team and US Secretary of State Condoleezza Rice.

Before the war, Sejdiu was an early protester against Yugoslav authoritarian rule and engaged in parallel institutions of the movement for liberation. During this time, he was member of Central Commission for the Referendum for Independence of Kosovo (organised in September 1991). During the period 1992-98 and 1998–2001, he was elected as member of Parliament of the Republic of Kosovo, serving as Secretary General of Parliament and Chairman of the Constitutional Commission. Sejdiu had for many years in his academic office a portrait depicting himself and fellow political party leader Veton Surroi locking arms before the riot police. He has always been widely admired for being honest and fair in all his political dealings.

Due to persisting conflicts between the Kosovo Liberation Army (KLA) and the security forces of Yugoslavia, the Kosovo War broke out in 1998. Accusations of widespread abuse by government forces towards ethnic Albanians in 1999 ignited the second part of the war in which NATO forces unleashed a bombing campaign against the government. The war ended in mid-1999, and Kosovo was placed under a UN Protectorate of autonomy where Ibrahim Rugova became the president of the territory. President Sejdiu succeeded Rugova and became the first president of Kosovo when it declared independence from Serbia on 17 February 2008.

As one of the founders of Democratic League of Kosovo (LDK), Sejdiu served in each of the Presidencies of the LDK, including two mandates as Secretary General of the Party. As well as serving on the Presidency of the Assembly of Kosovo and was one of the authors of the Constitutional Framework of Kosovo in 2001. He was an influential parliamentarian in the LDK, the party of former Kosovo President Ibrahim Rugova. On 10 February 2006, Fatmir Sejdiu was elected President of the Republic of Kosova with two-thirds of the votes of the Kosova Assembly members, after Rugova died from lung cancer in early 2006. Sejdiu has won praise from world leaders for prioritising implementation of the UN-endorsed standards of good governance and multi-ethnicity.

In the capacity of the country's president, Sejdiu as Head of the Kosovo Negotiation Team, led successfully the Kosovar Delegation (the Unity Team) in the internationally facilitated negotiations for resolving the final status of the Kosova in Vienna. Also Sejdiu led Kosovo delegation on extra 120 days of talks with Serbian delegation, mediated by envoys from the US, EU and Russia (Frank Wisner, Wolfgang Ischinger and Alexandar Botsan-Kharchenko). After this process of negotiations, Kosovo declared independence. Sejdiu participated in final drafting of text of Declaration of Independence of Kosovo, and also is the first to sign the Declaration of Independence.

On 9 January 2008, Sejdiu resigned from his position as President of Kosovo to run again in the following elections held the same day. This would allow him to start a completely new term with the inauguration of the new legislature, given that there are no term limits established by the Constitution Framework. He received 68 votes out of 81 needed for his election after a third round of parliamentary vote, when a simple majority of 61 votes is required for the election of the president and regained the position. His opponent, Naim Maloku of the Alliance for the Future of Kosovo (AAK), running with the support of three minor parties, obtained 37 votes in the first round. Sejdiu received one vote less in the second round, while 37 deputies chose Maloku. Sejdiu was elected in the third round of voting later on the same day.

On 27 September 2010, he stepped down from the post of president of the Republic of Kosovo following constitutional concerns. Prior to his resignation, the Constitutional Court of Kosovo stated that Fatmir Sejdiu was violating the Constitution of Kosovo, because he was both president of the Republic of Kosovo and also leader of Democratic League of Kosovo (LDK).

In November 2010, he lost the LDK leadership election to Isa Mustafa

== Honours and decorations ==
- Skanderbeg's Order honored by the President of the Republic of Albania.
- Doctor Honoris Causa degree from the University of Tirana.
- "Distinguished Global Leadership" award by the Arizona State University.
- Doctor Honoris Causa by the Sakarya University in Turkey.
- "Honorary Citizen" title of Shkodër, Shëngjin, Bajram Curri (town) and Margegaj Tropojë in Albania.

Political offices
Preceded by Nexhat Daci; Acting	President of Kosovo; 2006–2010	Succeeded by Jakup Krasniqi; Acting
