= Naim Maloku =

Kosovar politician and former military officer

Member of the Assembly of Kosovo

Personal details
- Born: February 17, 1958 (age 68) Labljane, FPR Yugoslavia
- Party: AAK

Military service
- Allegiance: (Federal Republic of Yugoslavia) Yugoslavia; Kosovo Liberation Army (KLA)
- Rank: (Federal Republic of Yugoslavia) Yugoslav military captain Deputy officer of the KLA in the Reka Keqe region
- Battles/wars: Kosovo War

Naim Maloku (Serbo-Croatian: Najim Maloku) (born February 17, 1958, in Labljane, FPR Yugoslavia) is a Kosovar Albanian politician and former officer of the Kosovo Liberation Army and deputy officer of the Kosovo Liberation Army in Reka Keqe. He is a member of the Assembly of Kosovo under the banner of the AAK party. In the 2008 presidential election, he was proposed by his party as a candidate for President of Kosovo, and subsequently supported by some other minor parties. He obtained 37 out of 81 required votes in the first round of elections, while his opponent, the president in demise, Fatmir Sejdiu, gained 62 votes. Maloku finally lost his bid to Sejdiu, who received 68 votes in the third round.
