= Judiciary of Kosovo =

Judiciary authority in the nation of Kosovo

The Judiciary of Kosovo is the collection of the central Kosovo institutions that exercises judicial authority in Kosovo. According to the 2008 Constitution of Kosovo, the judicial system is composed of the Supreme Court and subordinate courts, a Constitutional Court, and an independent prosecutorial institution. The courts are administered by the Kosovo Judicial Council.

== History ==
Until 2010, when the Law on Courts was approved by the Parliament of the Republic of Kosovo, the 1978 Law on Courts was in force. Under this law there was a regular system of courts consisting of the Municipal Court, District Court, the Court for Minor Offences, the High Court for Minor Offences and the Supreme Court. After the Constitution was enacted, another Court was added to the judicial system: Constitutional Court. But, as explained below, with the new law in force, the system of the Courts and Prosecution Offices had started to change.

In 1999, UNMIK was deployed to provide an interim administration of Kosovo through the present times and now when the justice system operates under the authority of the Constitution of the Republic of Kosovo. This period is sub-divided into four major periods, i.e. the establishment of an emergency justice system by UNMIK (June to December 1999), the justice system under the Joint Interim Administrative Structure (January 2000 to May 2001), the justice system under the Constitutional Framework for Self-Government in Kosovo (May 2001 to February 2008), and the justice system under the Constitution of the Republic of Kosovo (February 2008 to present).

On 15 December 2000, UNMIK Regulation 2000/64 was issued allowing for the assignment of international judges, prosecutors, or so called "Regulation 64 Panels", for particular cases. On 6 July 2003, UNMIK Regulation 2003/25 and 2003/26 were issued, enacting the Provisional Criminal Code and Provisional Criminal Procedure Code, replacing the Yugoslav Federal Criminal Code still in effect. On March 13, 2008, the Assembly passed Law 2008/03-L053, the Law on Jurisdiction, Case Selection and Case Allocation of EULEX Judges and Prosecutors in Kosovo, as well as Law 2008/03-L052, the Law on Special Prosecution Office of the Republic of Kosovo. These laws recognize the authority of EULEX judges, prosecutors, and courts to work in tandem with their Kosovan counterparts, which are governed by the Assembly of the EULEX Judges and an Assembly of the EULEX Prosecutors, respectively.

Provisions of the Law on Courts which came into force on January 1, 2013 define the new court structure and their hierarchy in Kosovo. The new structure not only changes the old court organization, but it also establishes new courts which are now located in both, larger and small municipalities. The aim of this structure is to bring more efficiency courts, and bring judges and court-houses more closer to the citizens of Kosovo.

From January 1, 2013 the new structure of prosecution offices in Kosovo will reflect the goal of the general justice reform in Kosovo towards more efficient, modern and professional approach to prosecution services, and better access to justice for all people.

== Analysis ==
Effective rule of law was and will remain critical for Kosovo to develop political, economic and social stability and security. Key to ensuring effective rule of law is a functioning justice system. Any form of political, administrative and judicial organization reflects the problems and challenges of its time, which it attempts to address by certain organizational forms. However, with time passing, the original purposes and policies tend to be overshadowed by new problems and challenges to be addressed by organizations, which were designed in a different historical context. In order to properly understand existing judicial institutions and bodies, it is important to understand the historical context which shaped their formation and structure. A reform of existing institutions cannot be undertaken without simultaneously taking into consideration the ‘past purposes’ and the ‘current challenges’ of such institutions.

== Courts ==
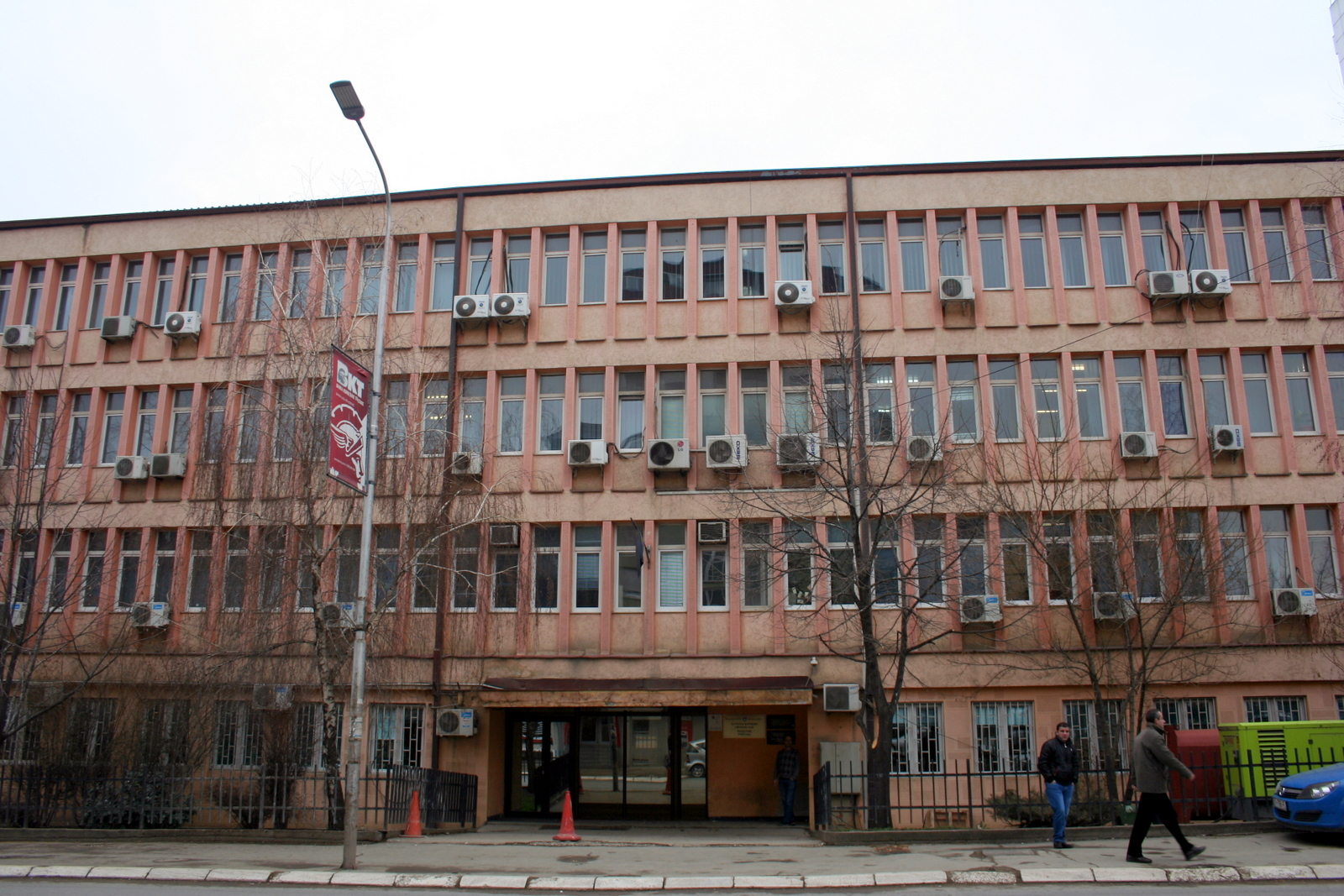
Supreme Court of Kosovo

=== Supreme Court ===
The Supreme Court is the highest judicial authority in Kosovo and shall have territorial jurisdiction over the entirety of the Republic of Kosovo. The Supreme Court competencies include: requests for extraordinary legal appeals against final decisions of the courts of Republic of Kosovo, as provided by Law; revision against second instance decisions of the courts on contested issues, as provided by Law; defines principled attitudes and legal remedies for issues that have importance for unique application of Laws by the courts in the territory of Kosovo; Kosovo Property Agency cases as defined by Law; in its Special Chamber, Privatization Agency of Kosovo or Kosovo Trust Agency cases as provided by Law; and other matters as provided by Law. The Supreme Court includes the Appeals Panel of the Kosovo Property Agency and the Special Chamber of the Supreme Court, the judges of which are part of the Supreme. The Supreme Court of the Republic of Kosovo is Located in Prishtina.

=== The Court of Appeals ===
The Court of Appeals is established as the second instance court with territorial jurisdiction throughout the Republic of Kosovo. The organisation of this court is as follows:

- General Department;
- Serious Crimes Department;
- Commercial Matters Department;
- Administrative Matters Department;
- Department for Juveniles.

This court is competent to review: all appeals from decisions of the Basic Courts; to decide at third instance, upon the appeal that is permitted by Law and for the conflict of jurisdiction between basic courts; conflicts of jurisdiction between Basic Courts; and other cases as provided by Law. The Court of Appeals is also located in Prishtina.

=== Seven basic courts and court branches ===
The Basic Courts are the courts of first instance in the Republic of Kosovo. Among other competencies, these courts are also competent to give international legal support and to decide for acceptance of decisions of foreign courts. These basic courts are located in 7 largest municipalities in Kosovo: Pristina, Gjilan/Gnjilane, Prizren, Gjakovë/Djakovica, Pejë/Peć, Ferizaj/Uroševac and Mitrovicë/Mitrovica. In addition to its principal seat, each Basic Court shall maintain branches of the court as provided in the Law.

The department organisation of the basic courts is as follows:

- Department for Commercial Matters operating in the Basic Court of Pristina for the entire territory of the Republic of Kosovo;
- Department for Administrative Cases operating in the Basic Court of Pristina for the entire territory of the Republic of Kosovo;
- Department for Serious Crimes operating at the principal seat of each Basic Court;
- General Department operating in each Basic Court and in each branch of the Basic Court.
- Department for Juveniles, operating within the Basic Courts.

The Commercial Matters Department of the Basic Court are competent for the following matters: disputes between domestic and foreign economic persons in their commercial affairs; reorganization, bankruptcy and liquidation of economic persons, unless otherwise provided by Law; disputes regarding obstruction of possession, with the exception of immovable property, between parties identified in sub-paragraph 1.1 of this paragraph; disputes regarding impingement of competition, misuse of monopoly and dominant market position, and monopolistic agreements; protection of property rights and intellectual property; disputes involving aviation companies for which the Law on aviation companies applies, excluding traveler disputes; and other matters as provided by Law.

The Administrative Matters Department of the Basic Court adjudicate and decide on administrative conflicts according to complaints against final administrative acts and other issues defined by Law.

The Serious Crimes Department of the Basic Court shall adjudicate the following criminal offenses as provided in the Criminal Code of Kosovo: commission of terrorism; criminal offenses against international Law; endangering civil aviation safety; establishing slavery, slavery-like conditions and forced labor; smuggling of immigrants; trafficking in persons; organized crime, including intimidation during criminal proceedings for organized crime; criminal offenses against official duty; and any other crime punishable by ten (10) years or more as provided by Law.

The General Department of the Basic Court shall hear and adjudicate all first instance cases unless within the competence of another Department of the Basic Court.

== Prosecution ==
The structure of prosecution offices is established according to the Law on State Prosecutor, parts of which entered into force on January 1, 2013, in compatibility with the new Law on Courts.

=== Office of the Chief State Prosecutor ===
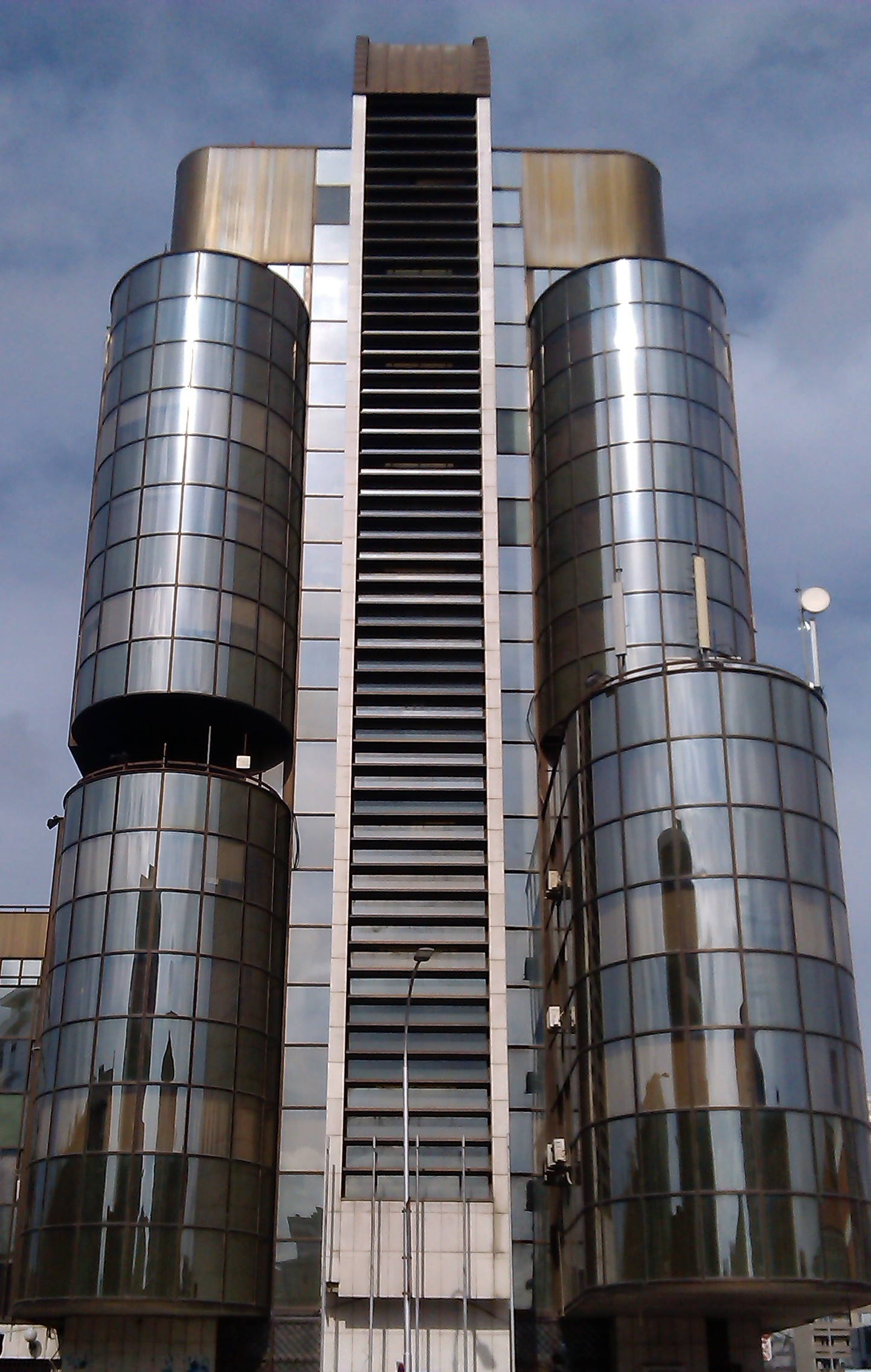
Office of the State Prosecutor and Kosovo Prosecutorial Council

Acts for the Supreme Court of the Republic of Kosovo, under the direct supervision of the Chief State Prosecutor, and has exclusive jurisdiction in the third instance over cases with extraordinary legal remedies. Its territorial competency covers the entire territory of Kosovo.

=== Special Prosecutor ===
Acts for the Serious Crimes Department of the Basic Court in Pristina, and handles cases of commission of terrorism, facilitation of the commission of terrorism, war crimes, employment of prohibited means of methods of warfare, and other matters as foreseen by the law on Law on Special Prosecution Office of the Republic of Kosovo. Cases are handled by prosecutors of the Republic of Kosovo and EULEX prosecutors.

=== Appellate Prosecution Office ===
Acts for the Court of Appeals, and handles in the second instance all criminal matters prosecuted and decided in the first instance by the basic level: all appeals for matters decided by basic courts, conflicts of jurisdiction and other cases provided by law. The Appellate Prosecution Office consists of the following departments:

1. General Crimes Department
2. Serious Crimes Department
3. Juveniles Crimes Department

The Appellate Prosecution Office has competency over the entire territory of the republic of Kosovo.

=== Seven basic prosecution offices ===
These are located in 7 largest municipalities in Kosovo: Pristina, Gjilan/Gnjilane, Prizren, Gjakovë/Djakovica, Pejë/Peč, Ferizaj/Uroševac and Mitrovicë/Mitrovica. The basic prosecution offices act for each respective basic court in Kosovo, and handle all criminal cases in the first instance through the following departments:

1. General Crimes Department
2. Serious Crimes Department
3. Juveniles Crimes Department

Any case falling within the jurisdiction of each respective department of the Basic Court is assigned to prosecutors within the departments of the Basic Prosecution Offices.

== Administration ==
=== Kosovo Judicial Council ===
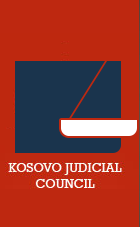
Kosovo Judicial Council Logo

Kosovo's Constitution foresees the responsibilities of Kosovo Judicial Council, under Article 108. This oversight body aims to ensure the independence and impartiality of the judicial system, and the administration of justice in the Republic of Kosovo.

The Kosovo Judicial Council (KJC) is the highest oversight body of the Kosovo Judicial System and an independent institution, and its main responsibility is the administration of the entire Judicial System. The overall purpose of Kosovo Judicial Council, as mandated by the applicable legal framework is to ensure an independent, fair, apolitical, accessible, professional and impartial judicial system, which reflects the multi-ethnic nature of Kosovo as well as the internationally recognized principles of human rights and gender equality.

To fulfill this goal Kosovo Judicial Council is responsible for selecting and proposing judges for appointment, as well as for elaborating policies for the overall management and reform of the judicial system. Kosovo Judicial Council is the institution, which evaluates disciplines and promotes the sitting judges and lay judges. Furthermore, the Kosovo Judicial Council is responsible for the overall management and administration of all courts, for the elaboration and the implementation of the budget of the judiciary and for the establishment of new courts and court branches.

Kosovo Judicial Council is composed of thirteen (13) members, both judges and lay members. Meanwhile, during the transitional period, in the composition of the Kosovo Judicial Council there are two EULEX judges who are currently practicing law in the courts of the Republic of Kosovo. The Council is chaired by Enver Peci.

=== Kosovo Prosecutorial Council ===
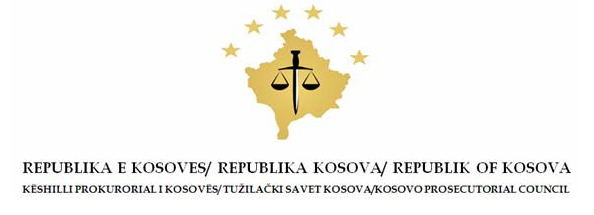
Kosovo Prosecutorial Council Logo

Kosovo's Constitution foresees the responsibilities of Kosovo Prosecutorial Council, under Article 110. The Kosovo Prosecutorial Council (KPC) is an independent institution and serves as the oversight body of the Prosecutorial System in the Republic of Kosovo. According to the law on the Kosovo Prosecutorial Council, the overall purpose is to ensure an independent, professional and impartial prosecution system, reflecting the multiethnic nature of Kosovo as well as the internationally recognized principles of gender equality. To fulfill this goal the Kosovo Prosecutorial Council is responsible for recruiting and proposing for appointment, training, evaluating, disciplining, transferring, dismissing and promoting prosecutors and for administrating the prosecution offices all over Kosovo. Furthermore, the Kosovo Prosecutorial Council develops policies to effectively combat crime, produce statistics and report to the Assembly about the work of the State Prosecutor. Nevertheless, the Council has no competence may not interfere with the concrete executive prosecutorial work. This is the sole responsibility of the Chief State Prosecutor, who represents the highest prosecution instance in Kosovo.

Kosovo Prosecutorial Council in its capacity of an independent institution leads and oversees the smooth fulfillment of the reform goals. Moreover, the Kosovo Prosecutorial Council ensures that its system of by-laws and regulations contemplates every important aspect of its operations so that it provides correct guidance to the institution and its employees during the discharge of their responsibilities.

The Kosovo Prosecutorial Council is composed of members both from the prosecution offices (prosecutors) and from other professional background, such as Civil Society, Law Faculty, Lawyers and the Minister of Justice as an ex officio member. This diverse composition allows for different input to the discussions and development of the overall strategy for the State Prosecution in Kosovo. The Kosovo Prosecutorial Council is chaired by the Chief State Prosecutor, Ismet Kabashi.
