= Constitutional Court of Kosovo =

Highest constitutional court of Kosovo

Constitutional Court of the Republic of Kosovo
- Gjykata Kushtetuese e Republikës së Kosovës; Ustavni sud Republike Kosovo
- Established: 2009
- Jurisdiction: Kosovo
- Location: Pristina, Kosovo
- Composition method: Appointed by the President upon proposal of the Assembly
- Authorised by: Constitution of Kosovo
- Judge term length: 9 years, non-renewable
- Number of positions: 9
- Website: www.gjk-ks.org

President
- Currently: Nexhmi Rexhepi
- Since: 31 December 2024

Vice President
- Currently: Safet Hoxha

The Constitutional Court of Kosovo (Albanian: Gjykata Kushtetuese e Kosovës; Serbian: Уставни суд Косова, Ustavni sud Kosova) is the final authority for the interpretation of the Constitution of Kosovo and judicial review of laws for compliance with the constitution. The Constitutional Court is located in Pristina, the capital of Kosovo. The Constitutional Court was established shortly after Kosovo's independence and heard its first cases in 2009.

== History ==
The first constitutional court in Kosovo was established in period of socialist Yugoslavia as the provincial constitutional court of the Socialist Autonomous Province of Kosovo following the decentralization reforms introduced by the 1974 Constitution. Together with the Constitutional Court of Vojvodina, it was at the time one of two provincial constitutional courts within the Socialist Republic of Serbia. Both courts were ultimately abolished in 1990, with the Constitutional Court of Serbia formally assuming responsibility for all remaining pending cases.

Before 2009, constitutional review in Kosovo had either been absent or exercised by other courts. Under the 1974 constitution, the provincial Constitutional Court was vested with the authority to review legislative acts for compliance with the higher law. The 1990 constitution of the Republic of Kosovo provided for a Constitutional Court (Albanian: Gjyqi Kushtetues), but Serbian control over Kosovo did not permit for the court to come into being.

During the UNMIK international administration, the 2001 Constitutional Framework envisaged a "Special Chamber of the Supreme Court" to review the constitutionality of legislative acts. However, ultimate authority was, as was political power itself, vested in the UN-appointed administrator of Kosovo.

The current Constitutional Court was established by the 2008 constitution, which came into effect months after Kosovo's declaration of independence. The Court heard its first cases in 2009.

== Composition ==
The Constitutional Court is composed of nine judges, appointed by the President of the Republic upon the proposal of the Assembly of Kosovo.

Members of the court
Position	Name	Ethnicity
President	Nexhmi Rexhepi	Albanian
Deputy president	Bajram Latifi	Albanian
Judges
Judges	Enver Peci	Albanian
Judges	Jeton Bytyqi	Albanian
Judges		Albanian
Judges	Radomir Laban	Serbian
Judges	Remzie Istrefi-Peci	Albanian
Judges	Safet Hoxha	Albanian
Judges		Albanian

Former members of the court
Position	Name	Ethnicity
President	Enver Hasani	Albanian
Judges
Judges	Altay Suroy	Turkish
Judges	Gjyljeta Mushkolaj	Albanian
Judges	Ilirjana Islami	Albanian
Judges	Ivan Čukalović	Serbian
Judges	Kadri Kryeziu	Albanian
International judges
International judges	Almiro Rodrigues	Portuguese
International judges	Robert F. Carolan	American
International judges	Snezhana Botusharova-Doicheva	Bulgarian

== Notable decisions ==
In 2010, the court ordered the municipality of Prizren to change its emblem in a more multi-ethnic one.

The Court twice deposed the president : in 2010, Fatmir Sejdiu stepped down because the court found he "seriously violated the constitution" because he was still leader of his party LDK, while the constitution (art. 88.2) forbids him to exercise any political party function and in 2011 it invalidated the 2011 presidential election, holding that the procedure used to appoint Behgjet Pacolli was unconstitutional.

In an important ruling in 2011 the Court invalidated a judgement of the Appellate panel of the Special Chamber of the Supreme Court of Kosovo, composed of EULEX judges. The Constitutional Court ruled that the Assembly of Kosovo had, since independence, the authority to amend or repeal UNMIK regulations.

In 2012, the parties who had supported the (indirect) election in 2011 of Atifete Jahjaga, also agreed on amending the constitution to install direct presidential elections. The Court had to assess these amendments whether they do not diminish any of the rights and freedoms of Chapter II of the constitution (art. 144.3) and found that the mandate of sitting president Atifete Jahjaga could not be cut short.

Following the 2014 parliamentary election, the Court became the focus of Kosovo politics, ruling on the formation of the executive and election of the Assembly speaker. The Court heard two cases. After no party obtained a majority in the general election, the President of the Republic petitioned the Court for an advisory opinion on whom the President was expected to appoint as candidate for prime minister. The majority of judges advised that the President appoint the candidate proposed by the party that had won a plurality in the election, even though smaller parties had now formed a coalition and held the parliamentary majority needed to get the candidate elected. In the second case, the Court majority invalidated the election of a minority party candidate as speaker of the parliament, holding that the indefinite right to propose the candidate for speaker of the Assembly belonged to the party that had won the most votes in the general election.

The Court also had to rule on the validity of the 2013 Agreement between Kosovo and Serbia creating the Community of Serb Municipalities.

The Court found no irregularities in the 2016 election by the Assembly of Hashim Thaçi as President of Kosovo in 2016.

In 2024, the Court ruled on the legality of billing consumers in the rest of Kosovo for electricity spent but not paid in the four northern municipalities of North Mitrovica, Zubin Potok, Leposavić and Zvečan. The Court upheld the decisions of the regular courts, holding that the Energy Regulatory Office's (ZRrE) practice of shifting these costs lacked a legal basis. The Court affirmed that forcing citizens to pay for unconsumed electricity constituted unequal treatment and resulted in unjust enrichment.
