= Constitution of Kosovo =

Supreme law of the Republic of Kosovo

Constitution of the Republic of Kosovo
- Cover of the 2020 edition, published by the Assembly of Kosovo, with amendments I–XXVI

Overview
- Original title: Kushtetuta e Republikës së Kosovës
- Jurisdiction: Kosovo
- Created: 2 April 2008
- Presented: 7 April 2008
- Ratified: 9 April 2008
- Date effective: 15 June 2008
- System: Unitary parliamentary republic

Government structure
- Branches: 3
- Head of state: President of Kosovo
- Chambers: Assembly of Kosovo (unicameral)
- Executive: Prime Minister
- Judiciary: Supreme Court of Kosovo; Constitutional Court of Kosovo
- Federalism: No

History
- Amendments: 26
- Commissioned by: Ahtisaari Plan
- Author: Constitutional Commission of Kosovo

Full text
- Proposed Constitution of the Republic of Kosovo (April 7, 2008) at Wikisource

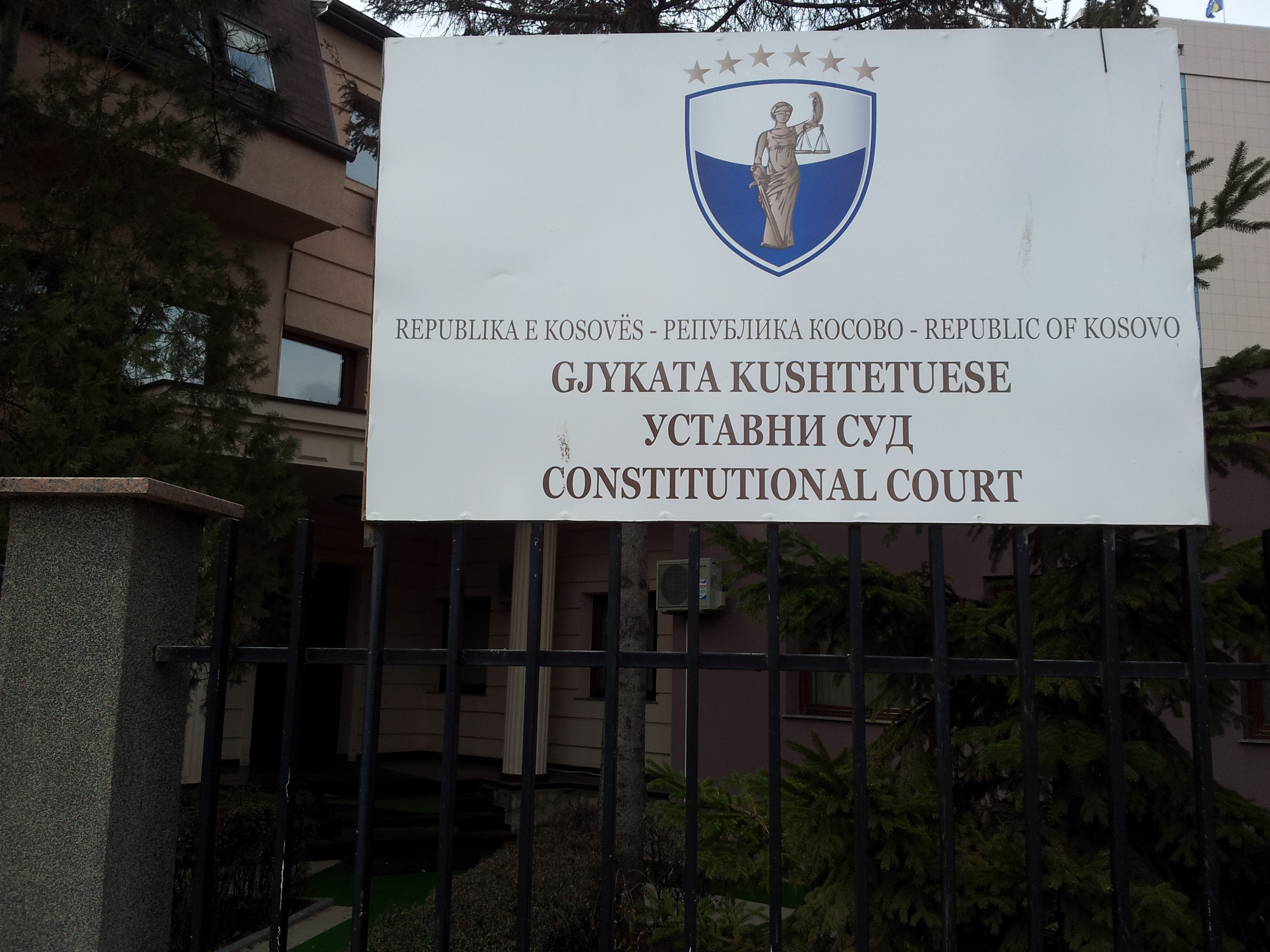

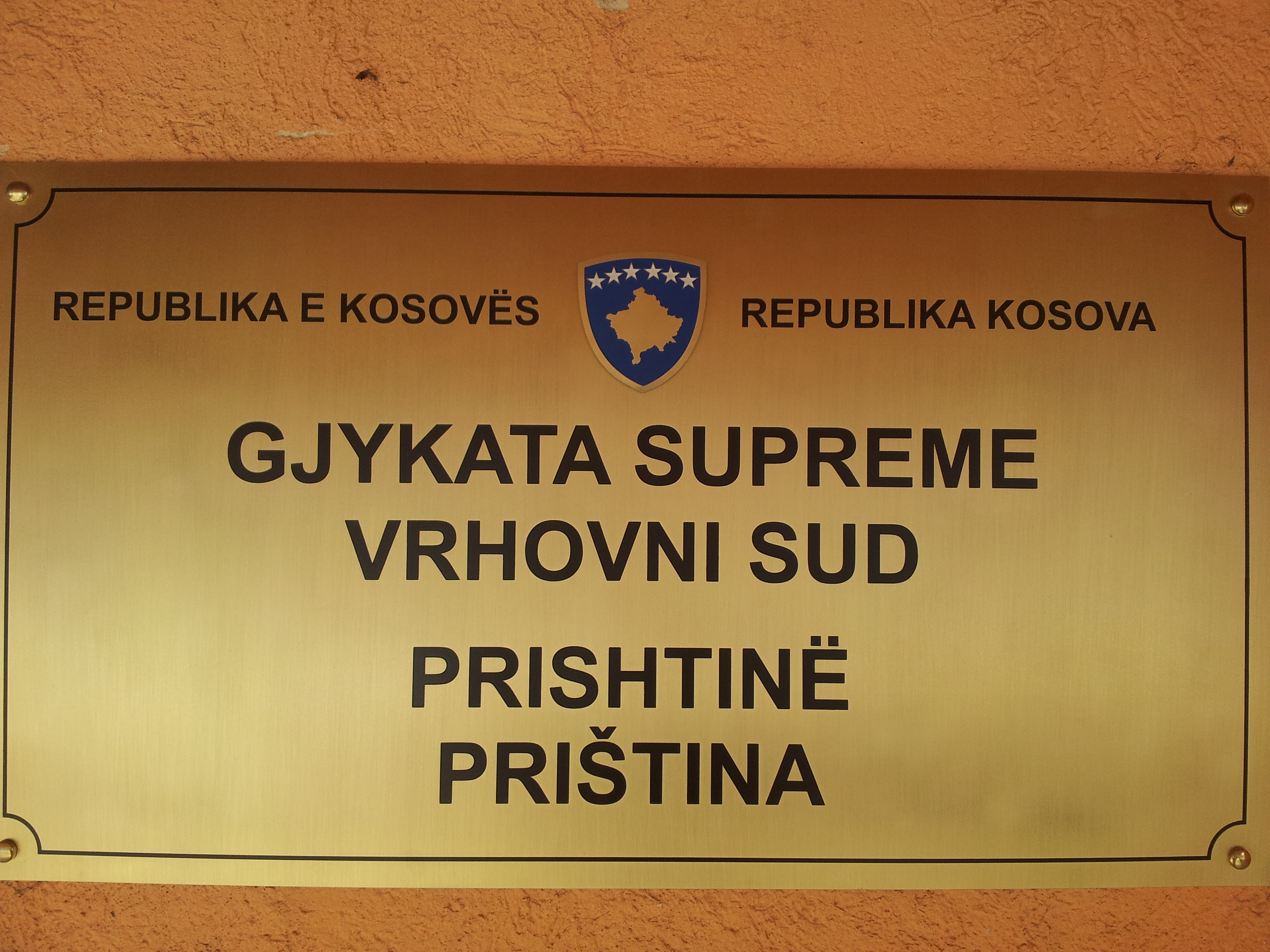

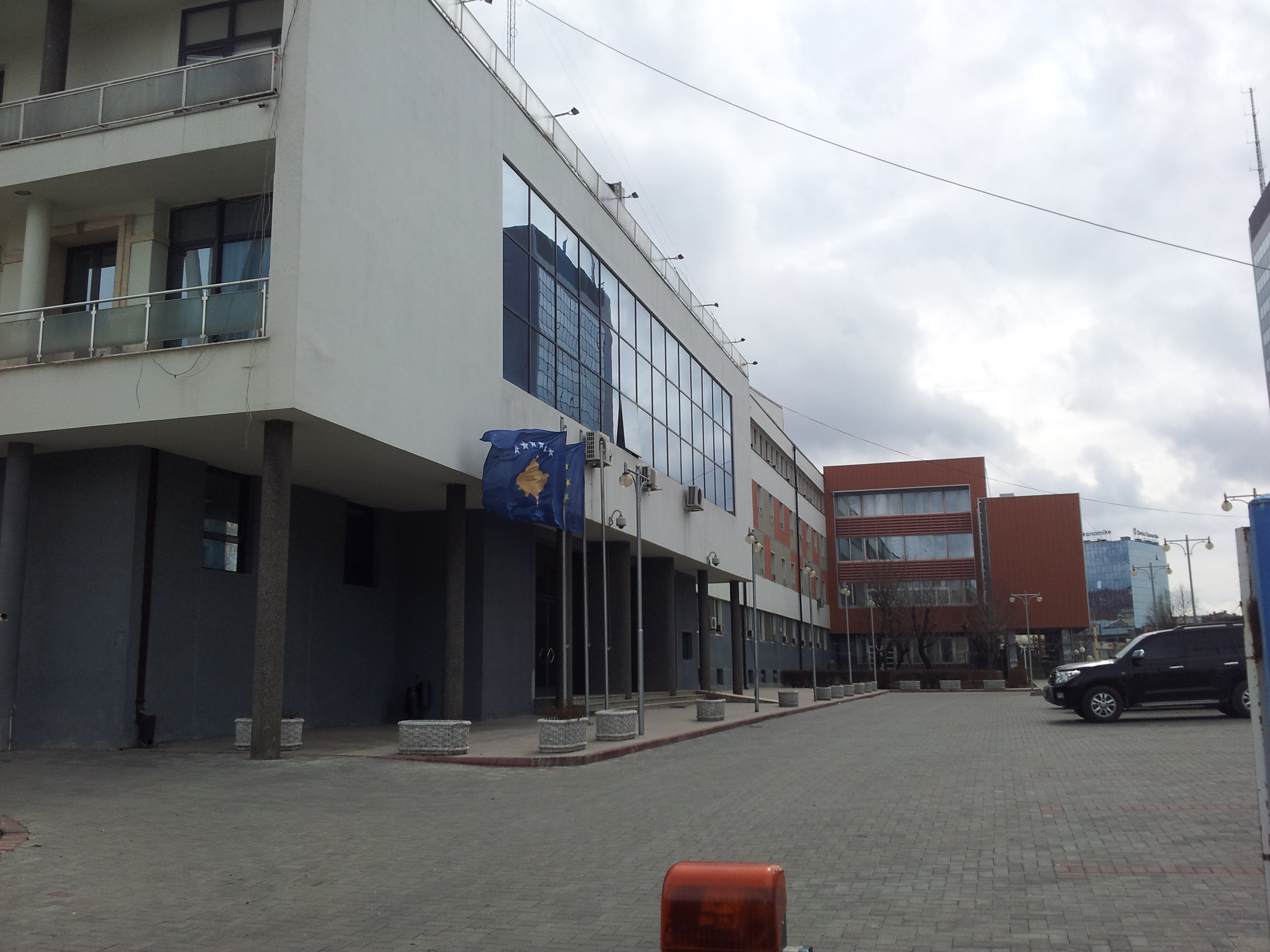

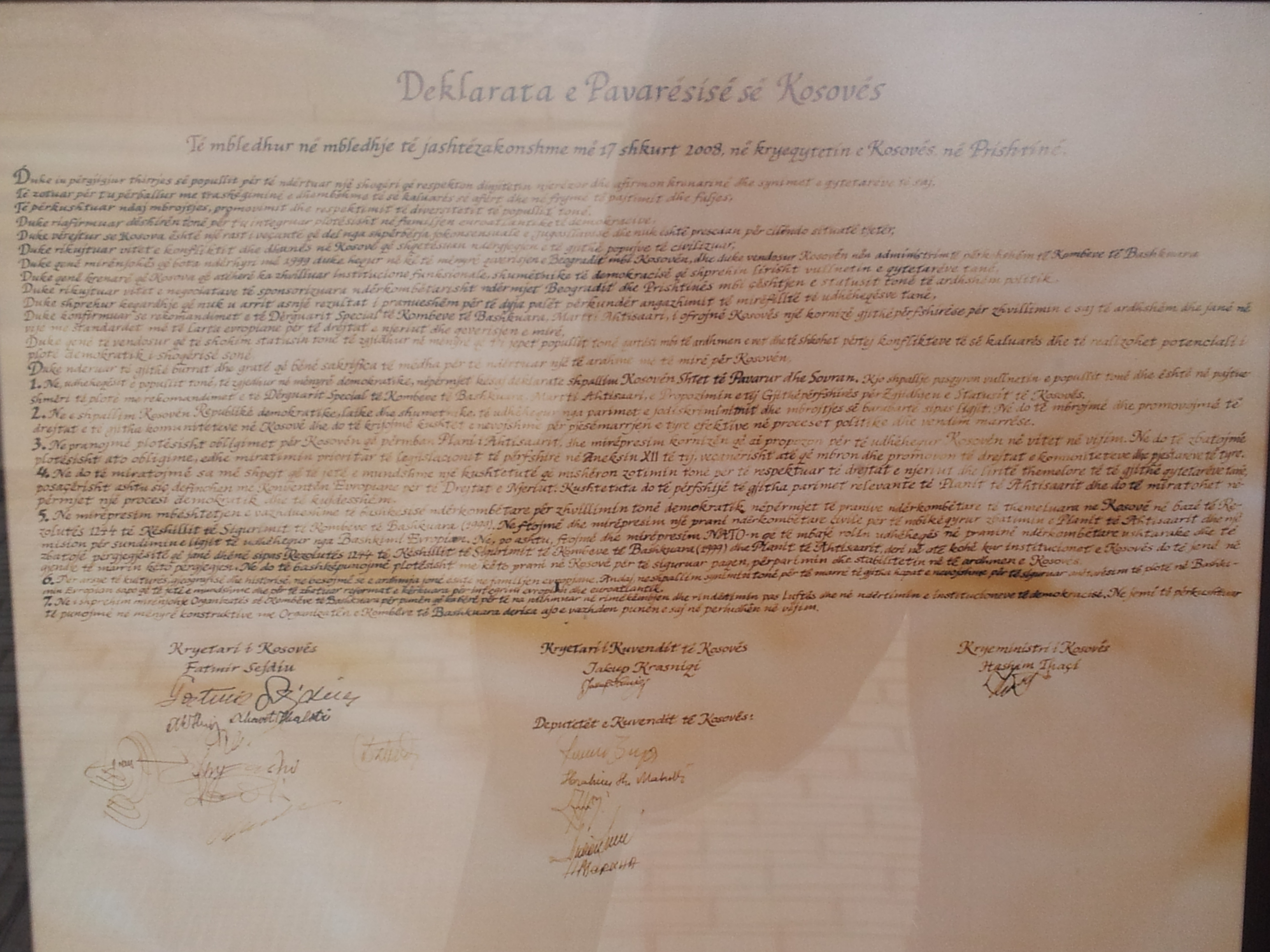

The Constitution of Kosovo (Albanian: Kushtetuta e Kosovës, Serbian: Устав Косовa / Ustav Kosova) is the supreme law (article 16) of the Republic of Kosovo, a territory of unresolved political status. Article four of the constitution establishes the rules and separate powers of the three branches of the government. The unicameral Assembly of the Republic exercises the legislative power, the executive branch led by the president and the prime minister which are responsible for implementing laws and the judicial system headed by the Supreme Court.

The constitution was signed on 7 April 2008 at 13:00 local time at the national library in Pristina. The constitution was ratified on 9 April and came to effect on 15 June 2008.

The Constitution of the Republic of Kosovo can be changed through the amendment process (article 144). Constitutional amendments are added to it, altering its effect. The foreword of the constitution reads:

We, the people of Kosovo, determined to build a future of Kosovo as a free, democratic and peace-loving country that will be a homeland to all of its citizens; committed to the creation of a state of free citizens that will guarantee the rights of every citizen, civil freedoms and equality of all citizens before the law; committed to the state of Kosovo as a state of economic wellbeing and social prosperity; convinced that the state of Kosovo will contribute to the stability of the region and entire Europe by creating relations of good neighborliness and cooperation with all neighboring countries; convinced that the state of Kosovo will be a dignified member of the family of peace-loving states in the world; with the intention of having the state of Kosovo fully participating in the processes of Euro-Atlantic integration; in a solemn manner, we approve the Constitution of the Republic of Kosovo.

Article 7, ensures the values and freedoms by the rule of law, equality same as respect, gender equality and social justice and the neutrality towards religion by the article 8 of the Constitution.

The constitution guides Kosovo's law and political culture. Writers were influenced mostly by two documents: the Ahtisaari plan and the fourhand – and the UN Security Council Resolution 1244 which was the base document for a period from 10 June 1999. The final authority for the interpretation of the constitution of the Republic of Kosovo is the Constitutional Court of Kosovo.

Kosovo lawyers and politicians have repeatedly called for amendments or a thorough revision of the constitution. Proposals include removing the prohibition of unification with Albania (art. 1.3), allowing direct elections for the president, and improving the language of the document. Alternative draft constitutions have also been proposed, before and after the declaration of independence.

== History ==
=== First constitution, 1974 ===
The Constitution of the Socialist Autonomous Province of Kosovo was adopted on 28 February 1974, by the Assembly of Kosovo and the Assembly of Yugoslavia, whilst Kosovo was still an autonomous province of Serbia. The federal 1974 Yugoslav Constitution that was adopted a week earlier granted federal units of the Socialist Federal Republic of Yugoslavia to create their own constitutions, making this the first constitution of Kosovo that was integrated into a constitution of the SFR Yugoslavia. It replaced the Kosovo Constitutional Law of 1963, granting Kosovo a high degree of constitutional, legislative and judicial autonomy. Per the Constitutions of SFR Yugoslavia from 1974, SAP Kosovo also gained its own Constitution and the highest officials, most notably Presidency and Government.

The constitution stated that all ethnicities of Kosovo should unite under the people's socialist revolution and the Communist party in its lead, against class warfare and further class inequality. The head of the Assembly Ilaz Kurteshi signed the constitution on 27 February 1974 and it was adopted the same day.

Five points below explain the main reasons for its existence and importance:

1. From 1944 onwards Kosovo's participation in the federal Yugoslavia was mostly like the other federal units.
2. Since 1944, and particularly under the 1974 SFRY constitution, Kosovo had a substantial degree of autonomy. In all areas, social economic and national policy.
3. Under the 1974 Constitution, the six republics along with Vojvodina and Kosovo had a similar constitutional position, the main difference was that while the republics (Bosnia and Herzegovina, Croatia, Macedonia, Montenegro, Serbia and Slovenia) were granted the right to secede, provinces of Kosovo and Vojvodina were not.
4. Kosovo had the same protection that the republics had in disputes between Serbia and Kosovo including the Federal Constitutional Court. This was removed in 1989–1990 and could not be re-established once the SFRY had disintegrated.
5. The position of Kosovo under the 1974 Constitution was cancelled in 1989–1990 by Serbia's federal authorities.

=== Second constitution, 1989–1990 ===
After the speech that Slobodan Milošević gave on 24 April 1987 and on 28 June 1989, the Gazimestan speech in front of a large number of ethnic Serbs at the main celebration marking the 600th anniversary of the Battle of Kosovo. Some think that this speech helped Miloševic consolidate his authority in Serbia. With the rise to power of nationalist movement in Serbia, the limitation of powers for Kosovo begin. In 1989 the Serbian assembly began passing amendments for restricting Kosovo's powers, guaranteed by the 1974 SFRY Constitution. It could propose such amendments but these required acceptance by the Kosovo Assembly before being adopted.

On 23 March 1989 Kosovo Assembly accepted changes to its constitution, removing its autonomy. Representatives handpicked by Serbia approved changes to Kosovo's Constitution, starting the disintegration of the SFRY and the oppression and brutality in Kosovo.

=== Constitution of Kaçanik ===
Kosovo Albanians responded with a non-violent independence movement, employing widespread civil disobedience and creation of parallel structures in education, medical care, and taxation, with the ultimate goal of achieving the independence of Kosovo.

On 2 July 1990, the self-declared Kosovo parliament declared Kosovo a republic in Yugoslavia. On 7 September 1990 in the town of Kaçanik, 35 miles south of Pristina and in an improvised session promulgated the Constitution of the Republic of Kosovo. Witch confirmed the referendum and on 22 September 1991 declared Kosovo an independent country, the Republic of Kosova. In May 1992, Ibrahim Rugova was elected president. During its run, the Republic of Kosova was recognized only by Albania; it was formally disbanded in 2000, after the Kosovo War, when its institutions were replaced by the Joint Interim Administrative Structure established by the United Nations Interim Administration Mission in Kosovo (UNMIK).

The Constitution of Kaçanik 1990, was written to give Kosovo Albanians freedom, fairness and wellbeing within Yugoslavia and stipulated that the people were the ones who select their wellbeing and futures. The head of the meeting on 7 September 1990 was Iljaz Ramajli.

=== Constitutional Framework, 2001 ===
Following the Kosovo War, Kosovo came under the administration of the United Nations in June 1999. The United Nations Interim Administration Mission in Kosovo (UNMIK), promulgated a Constitutional Framework for Provisional Self-Government in Kosovo on 15 May 2001. The charter stated that "Kosovo is an entity under interim international administration" and established Provisional Institutions of Self-Government in Kosovo including a 120-member Assembly of Kosovo, a Cabinet of Kosovo and the positions of President of Kosovo and Prime Minister of Kosovo.

=== Influences ===
==== UN Security Council Resolution 1244 ====
Kosovo's constitutional status between June 1999 and February 2008 was established by the United Nations in UN Security Council Resolution 1244 (UNSCR 1244), adopted on 10 June 1999. The Security Council placed Kosovo under the temporary administration of the United Nations Mission in Kosovo (UNMIK), under the leadership of Special Representative of the Secretary-General (SRSG). It also explicitly upheld the existing sovereignty of Serbia over Kosovo, "reaffirming the commitment of all Member States to the sovereignty and territorial integrity of the Federal Republic of Yugoslavia and the other States of the region". It also envisaged a process to determine Kosovo's final status.

The problem for either side was noted by Ylber Hysa: Although "Resolution 1244 respects the sovereignty and territorial integrity of the Federal Republic of Yugoslavia, including Kosovo", and even provided for Serbian troops to be stationed in the province, on the ground "certain territories are under the full control of KFOR and the international administration" without any Serbian involvement (citat: Ylber Hysa, "Kosovo: a permanent international protectorate?", p. 288 in The UN Role in Promoting Democracy: Between Ideals and Reality, eds. Edward Newman, Roland Rich (United Nations University Press, 2004). However the part in question was never implemented. The severely circumscribed control exercised by Serbia in Kosovo has led some commentators to describe the nature of its sovereignty as purely "nominal".

On 15 May 2001, UNMIK enacted a "Constitutional Framework for Provisional Self-Government (ciat :) Although it provides a constitutional framework, it is not constitution, and is deliberately nonjudgmental on the question of sovereignty, as UNMIK itself does not have a role in the determination of Kosovo's final status. It defines Kosovo as "an entity under interim international administration" and "an undivided territory".

Serbia's interference in Kosovo has caused significant problems. UNMIK was given exclusive rights to manage Kosovo's economic affairs and stated its intent in the Constitutional Framework to establish a market economy. Prior to 1999, much of Kosovo's economy had been controlled by the state. All publicly owned enterprises were owned by the Yugoslav government or the Serbian state, both governed from Belgrade. When UNMIK began implementing privatization of assets that it did not own, Serbs with interests in the companies subject to privatization sued first UNMIK and then the UN in New York.

Swedish economist Jessica Johnson claims that the fact that Kosovo is still regarded in law as being part of Serbia, as well as the ongoing political tensions, has caused it significant difficulties in achieving economic development and that its uncertain legal status has prevented it from accessing lending from International Financial Institutions such as the World Bank.

The establishment of UNMIK based on UNSCR 1244 was primarily intended to preserve the territorial integrity of Kosovo and grant it "substantial autonomy" until a final status could be met. Albanian Kosovars viewed this mandate as a step towards an independent and sovereign Kosovo. In a secret meeting in Prizren in 2000, headed by the SRSG Bernard Kouchner, there was an attempt to see if the 1999 Rambouillet Peace Accords document could be used as a model for constitution drafting, but this document essentially gave Serbia power to establish territorial and institutional "parallel structures" of government in Kosovo and also block decision-making processes in the central government in Kosovo. Kouchner realized that Rambouillet could not be the document that would establish a sustainable government scheme for Kosovo and Serbia, though the idea of using the peace accords as a foundation for the constitution would be an inspiration for the Ahtisaari Plan.

Serbia's unwillingness to recognize Kosovo and the general lack of consensus in the international community as to whether Kosovo should be independent left Kosovo in a state of limbo after 1999, during its administration under UNMIK. To mitigate the economic and social problems that come from what was essentially a client state like Kosovo, the U.N. Security Council issued the Comprehensive Proposal for the Kosovo Status Settlement, otherwise known as the Ahtisaari Plan.

==== Ahtisaari plan ====
Ahtisaari stated on 8 February 2007 that after a period of consultations with the parties he would finalize his Settlement proposal for submission to the UN Security Council and at that stage he would also elaborate on the status issue itself (citat: ^ "Ahtisaari press conference ",).

In Belgrade, Serbian Prime Minister Vojislav Koštunica refused to receive Ahtisaari. Koštunica claimed that because Serbia had still not formed a new government after the 21 January parliamentary elections he had no mandate to discuss Kosovo and therefore could not meet Ahtisaari. He later denounced the proposal as "illegitimate and unacceptable" because he alleged it "violates the U.N. Charter ... by undermining sovereignty of U.N. member Serbia (citat: ^ "Ahtisaari's proposal unacceptable and illegitimate for Serbia", Government of the Republic of Serbia website, Belgrade, 7 February 2007.) President Boris Tadic did receive Ahtisaari, after which he reaffirmed his vow to never accept an independent Kosovo (citat: ^ "U.N. envoy unveils Kosovo proposal, by Garentina Kraja, Associated Press (AP), Pristina, 2 February 2007). Foreign Minister Vuk Draškovic warned that it was "necessary to avoid an imposed solution that could cause Serbia to become a factor of instability. Citat: ^ "Serbian leaders warn UN plan for Kosovo could destabilize Balkans", International Herald Tribune, Belgrade, 7 February 2007.

In Pristina, Kosovo Albanian leaders issued a statement after meeting with Ahtisaari saying they are "convinced that the international process for the resolution of Kosovo's status led by President Ahtisaari will be concluded soon with Kosovo becoming an independent state. Citat: ^ "Unity Team Press Statement," 2 February 2007.)

The United States called the proposal "fair and balanced, citat: ^ Presentation of Kosovo Status Proposal to the Parties, Sean McCormack, U.S. Department of State spokesman, Washington, DC, 2 February 2007.) while the EU Presidency noted that Ahtisaari's proposals "build on almost twelve months of direct talks between Belgrade and Pristina. " citat: ^ EU Presidency Statement on the Kosovo status proposals to be presented today by Martti Ahtisaari in Belgrade and Pristina, 2 February 2007.

On 21 February, Ahtisaari began a period of consultations with the parties in Vienna to finalize the Settlement. He made clear that his proposal was a draft and that he would incorporate compromise solutions into the final document. After this period of consultations and further modification of the Settlement, Ahtisaari convened a high-level meeting of the parties in Vienna on 10 March. After this meeting, leaders from both sides signaled a total unwillingness to compromise on their central demands (Kosovo Albanians for Kosovo's independence; Serbia for continued sovereignty over Kosovo). Concluding that there was no chance for the two sides to reconcile their positions, Ahtisaari said he intended to submit to the UN Security Council his proposed status recommendations, including an explicit recommendation for the status outcome itself, by the end of March.

In November 2008, the EU accepted the demand of Serbia not to implement the plan of Ahtisaari through EULEX.

=== Declaration of Independence ===
The Republic of Kosovo declared independence on 17 February 2008. The participants unanimously declared Kosovo to be independent from Serbia, while all 11 representatives of the Serb minority boycotted the proceedings.

The legality of the declaration, and whether it was an act of the Assembly has been disputed. Serbia sought international validation for its stance that the declaration was illegal, and in October 2008 requested a judgement from the International Court of Justice. However, the Court ruled that the declaration was legal.

The 2008 declaration was a result of the Ahtisaari plan negotiations that broke down in the fall of 2007. The plan, prepared by the UN Special Envoy and former president of Finland, Martti Ahtisaari, hoped that a supervised independence by the European Union (without expressly using the word "independence") would show that the polarized interests in Kosovo could sustain self-governance with a constitution and a representative government that was obligated to expressly protect its minorities' rights. Kosovo would be accorded its own national symbols such as a flag and a coat of arms, and be obligated to carry out border demarcation on the Kosovo-Republic of Macedonia border. The Albanian negotiators essentially in whole supported the Ahtisaari plan, the latter that also gained the support of the European Union and of the United States. However, Serbia and Russia rejected it outright, and continued United Nations intersession was fruitless.

Negotiations stopped. The Kosovars unilaterally proclaimed the Republic of Kosovo, and obligating themselves to follow the Ahtisaari plan's provisions in full. Border demarcation talks with Macedonia were delayed because the Kosovars insisted on the pre-condition of official recognition but eventually withdrew the opposition. The 2008 Kosovo declaration of independence elicited mixed international reaction and was domestically continuously polarizing between the Kosovo Serbs and the Kosovo Albanians.

After 13 years of international oversight, Kosovo's authorities formally obtained full unsupervised control of the region (less only North Kosovo) on 10 September 2012 when Western Powers terminated their oversight. The International Steering Group, in its final meeting with the authorities in Pristina, declared that the Comprehensive Proposal for the Kosovo Status Settlement, known as the Ahtisaari plan after its Finnish UN creator, had been substantially implemented.

=== Drafting the Constitution ===
When the time came for resolution of the process, United Nations Secretary General Kofi Annan appointed Martti Ahtisaari to lead the Kosovo status process in November 2005. In a period of fourteen months Ahtisaari held seventeen rounds of negotiations between Serbian and Kosovar officials in Vienna and made twenty-six expert missions to both capitals. These discussions had a great support of the Contact Group, which included the United States, the UK, France, Germany and Italy as well as Russia. On 2 February 2007, the final report was released which included the "Ten guiding principles", which created a structure and authorities for the broad governing of Kosovo and its government. The report contained a broad provision for Kosovo's autonomy which included the power to enter into international agreements as well as to become a member of international organizations but the report also constrains Kosovo's sovereignty because of the power sharing arrangements with the minority groups that international missions had the power to enforce. The only contact group state that refused the proposal was Russia, stating that the Serbian part of the agreement was not held.

Because of Russia's rejection of the plan, a "Troika" from German Foreign Minister Frank-Walter Steinmeier of representatives from the United States, European Union, and Russia held additional negotiations to reach an agreement. However, the parties were not able to reach an agreement on the final status of Kosovo. Despite the stalemate inside the international consensus, Kosovo declared independence on 17 February 2008 and the Assembly adopted a declaration of independence in accordance with the Special Envoy of the U.N. Ahtissari and the plan agreed by the official Pristina. (8) It pledged to be a democratic republic and accept all the obligations under the Ahtisaari plan, including the adoption of a new constitution within 120 days. The Kosovo Assembly approved a new constitution in April 2008 and it went into effect on 15 June 2008. Although Kosovo declared independence in February, the U.N. did not approve the plan of the Special Envoy, Ahtisaari; the Constitutional Commission began to draft the Constitution as early as March 2007. The commission was to be composed of 21 Kosovo members, 15 appointed by the President of Kosovo, 3 by the Assembly holding seats reserved for minorities especially Serbs, and 3 members of other minority communities also appointed by the Assembly.

First the sub-groups of the Commission published the drafted segments of the Constitution in late summer of 2007. Then the entire Commission submitted drafts for the reviewing process, internal and international advisors did the review. By the end of 2007, the Commission produced a draft constitution, directly derived from the Ahtisaari plan.

After the Declaration of Independence, the Constitution was published for public comment, with more than 1000 comments from the public and the Commission holding public hearings for gathering more suggestions the final draft was created. The final draft was completed in April 2008 and the ratification process then went into force on 15 June 2008. The new Constitution created a parliamentary republic with pledges to protect minorities. In terms of structure, the President is the head of state and the Prime Minister, elected by the Kosovo Assembly, is the head of the government. The unicameral Kosovo Assembly contains 120 seats. Of those seats, ten are reserved for ethnic Serbs, ten for other designated minorities, and three are for other non-specified minority groups.

The Constitution through the Constitutional Commission – Timeline by the press releases of the Constitutional Commission –

1. Pristina, Kosovo, 24 January 2008 – Constitution Working Group Announces Launch of Public Information Process
2. Pristina, Kosovo, 5 February 2008 – Phase two of the Constitution public information campaign will begin when draft constitution is released
3. Pristina, Kosovo, 8 February 2008 – Phase Two of the Constitution Public Information Campaign to Start Soon
4. Pristina, Kosovo, 17 February 2008 – The Constitutional Commission of Kosovo Launches Phase Two of the Constitution Public Information Campaign – Draft Constitution Available for Public Consultation
5. Pristina, Kosovo, 21 February 2008 – The Constitutional Commission Discuses with the Public the Draft Constitution of the Republic of Kosovo
6. Pristina, Kosovo, 22 February 2008 – The Constitutional Commission Continues to discuss the Draft Constitution of the Republic of Kosovo with the Public
7. Pristina, Kosovo, 26 February 2008 – The Constitutional Commission Continues to Receive Comments on the Draft Constitution of the Republic of Kosovo

All these can be found here –

1. Pristina, Kosovo, 4 March 2008 – The Constitutional Commission Reviews the Public's Comments on the Draft Constitution of the Republic of Kosovo (14)
2. Pristina, Kosovo, 2 April 2008 – The Constitutional Commission adopts the final version of the Draft Constitution of the Republic of Kosovo
3. Draft Constitution of Republic of Kosovo is certified
4. Pristina, Kosovo, 7 April 2008 – The Constitutional Commission submits the Proposed Constitution to the President of the Republic of Kosovo

All these can be found here – – Audio presentation of the commission – (16)

== National Government ==
The Republic of Kosovo has three branches of the government: Legislative which is led by the Assembly, Executive branch which is led by the President and Prime Minister and the Judicial System which is led by the Supreme Court.

=== Legislative ===
The Republic of Kosovo is an independent, sovereign, democratic, unique and inseparable state. The Republic of Kosovo is a democratic republic based on the principle of division of governments and checks and balances among them. In the Republic of Kosovo the legislative power is exercised by the Assembly of the Republic of Kosovo. As such, the Assembly of the Republic of Kosovo is the highest representative and legislative institution in Republic of Kosovo directly elected by the people. The Assembly comprises 120 deputies elected by secret ballot. However, not all deputies are elected by the free vote of the people – secret and democratic voting. The Assembly of the Republic of Kosovo has these responsibilities:

- Adopts laws and resolutions in the areas of responsibility of interim institutions
- Elects the Presidency of the Assembly
- Elects the President of the Assembly
- Approves the candidate for the Prime minister together with the list of ministers of the Government, proposed by the candidate for Prime minister
- Reviews and ratifies the proposed international agreements, within the scope of its responsibilities; decides about the motions of trust vote against the Government
- Guides the Government in the preparation of the draft laws
- Approves the Rules of Procedure of the Assembly and of the parliamentary committees
- Has other responsibilities pursuant to the Constitutional Frame or other legal instruments.

To meet its responsibilities the Assembly convenes every week. The Presidency of the Assembly is responsible for reviewing and preparing the daily agenda of the Assembly for the meeting of the previous week and the temporary daily agenda for two weeks ahead.

The approval of the government's decisions is reached with consensus and if there is not consensus then the approval is done with the majority of the votes of members present. To the right to present the draft laws in the Assembly are entitled the Government, the President of Republic of Kosovo, the Assembly deputies, or at least ten thousand citizens as provided for by the law. After the process of presenting the draft law the process goes through these phases:

1. The first review of the draft law, which is done not earlier than ten working days and not later than three working weeks after its dissemination, includes the approval in principle of the draft law and this review does not allow any amendments
2. After the approval of the first review the draft law is reviewed by the respective functional committee, Budget Committee and Judicial, Legislative, and Constitutional Frame Committee
3. The Committee on Rights and Interests of Communities reviews a draft law only when it is required by a member of the Presidency or by the majority of the members of the Committee for Communities. During this review recommendations are drafted in the committees in relation with the amendments that are considered necessary and based on which the draft law can be recommended for approval during the second review
4. The Assembly reviews the amendments proposed by the committees and so does the amendments proposed by the Government, by the groups of deputies, and by individual deputies before deciding about the approval of the second review
5. After the amendments were selected for review, were approved, or were rejected, the final voting is made for the draft law in general with its amendments
6. If a draft law is not approved in the second review, the person making the proposal may request the approval of the Assembly for further review-third review
7. The laws adopted either in the second adoption or in the third adoption are signed by the President of the Assembly within 48 hours and then they are submitted to the President of Kosovo to promulgate them
8. The laws shall enter into force on the day of their promulgation by the President of Kosovo, unless otherwise provided for by the law.

=== Executive ===
The President is the head of the state and represents the unity of the people of the Republic of Kosovo. Any citizen of the Republic of Kosovo, who is 35 years or older may be elected president. The President is elected by the Assembly, in a secret ballot. The election of the President shall take place no later than 30 days before the end of the current President's term of office. The President is elected by a two-thirds majority of all the deputies of the Assembly.

Competencies of the President of the Republic of Kosovo:

- Represents the Republic of Kosovo internally and externally
- Guarantees constitutional functioning of the institutions set forth by this Constitution
- Announces elections for the Assembly of Kosovo and convenes its first meeting
- Issues decrees in accordance with this Constitution
- Promulgates laws approved by the Assembly of the Republic of Kosovo
- Has the right to return adopted laws for reconsideration, if the president considers that they are harmful to the legitimate interests or one or more communities. This right can be exercised only once per law
- Signs international agreements in accordance with this Constitution
- Proposes amendments to this Constitution
- May refer constitutional questions to the Constitutional Court
- Leads the foreign policy of the country
- Receives credentials of heads of diplomatic missions accredited to the Republic of Kosovo
- Is the Commander in Chief of the Kosovo Security Force
- Leads the Consultative Council for Communities
- Appoints the candidate for Prime Minister for the establishment of the Government, after proposal by the political party or coalition holding the majority in the Assembly
- Appoints and dismisses the President of the Supreme Court of the Republic of Kosovo upon the proposal of the Kosovo Judicial Council
- Appoints and dismisses judges of the Republic of Kosovo upon the proposal of the Kosovo Judicial Council
- Appoints and dismisses the Chief Prosecutor of the Republic of Kosovo upon the proposal of the Kosovo Prosecutorial Council
- Appoints and dismisses prosecutors of the Republic of Kosovo upon the proposal of the Kosovo Prosecutorial Council
- Appoints judges to the Constitutional Court upon the proposal of the Assembly
- Appoints the Commander of Kosovo Security Force upon recommendation of the Prime minister
- Jointly with the Prime minister appoints the Director, Deputy Director and Inspector General of the Kosovo Intelligence Agency
- Decides to declare a State of Emergency in consultation with the Prime Minister
- May request meetings of the Kosovo Security Council and chairs them during a State of Emergency
- Decides on the establishment of diplomatic and consular missions of the Republic of Kosovo in consultation with the Prime Minister
- Appoints and dismisses heads of diplomatic missions of the Republic of Kosovo upon the proposal of the Government
- Appoints the Chair of the Central Election Commission
- Appoints the Governor of the Central Bank of the Republic of Kosovo, who also acts as its Managing
- Director, and appoints the other members of the Bank's Board
- Grants medals, titles of gratitude, and awards in accordance with the law
- Grants individual pardons in accordance with the law
- Addresses the Assembly of Kosovo at least once a year in regard to her/his scope of authority.

The President's Cabinet is the highest body of the presidency of the Republic of Kosovo consisting of the structure presented in following:

- President
- High political Advisor
- High political Advisor for economy
- High political Advisor for Education, Science and Culture
- Political Advisor for Legal Matters
- Advisor for media and spokesperson of president's office
- Political Advisor
- Political Advisor for European Integration.

The President of the Republic of Kosovo, Prof. Dr. Fatmir Sejdiu was elected the President of Kosovo on 10 February 2006 and was re-elected in the second term of office. Before exercising the position of the president Fatmir Sejdiu was member of the Presidency of Democratic League of Kosovo (DLK) and the General Secretary of DLK. Dr Ibrahim Rugova is the first elected president of the Republic of Kosovo. Rugova was elected President of the Republic of Kosovo in the first multi-party elections for the Assembly of Kosovo, held on 24 May 1992. Following that, Rugova, was re-elected the President of the Republic of Kosovo in the elections held in March 1998. DLK under the leadership of Rugova also won the majority of votes in the first local elections in Kosovo in October 2000, and in the first national elections in 2001, and he was re-elected President in the second local elections in 2002 and in the last national elections in 2004.

The Government of Kosovo exercises the executive power in accordance with the Constitution and the law. The Government of Kosovo is composed by the Prime minister, vice-prime ministers and ministers. The Government implements the laws and acts ratified by the Assembly of Kosovo, and carries out other activities within the responsibilities defined by the Constitution and law. The Government takes decisions in accordance with the Constitution and laws, and proposes draft laws and amendments of existing laws and other acts, and may give opinions about the draft laws that were not proposed by the Government.

The competencies of the Government are:

1. Proposes and implements the internal and external policy of the country
2. Enables the economic development of the country
3. Proposes draft laws and other acts to the Assembly
4. Takes decisions and prepares legal acts and regulations necessary for the implementation of the laws
5. Proposes the Budget of the Republic of Kosovo
6. Instructs and oversees the work of the administration
7. Instructs about the activity and development of public services
8. Proposes to the President of the Republic of Kosovo the appointments and dismissals of chiefs of diplomatic missions of Kosovo
9. Proposes the amendment of the Constitution
10. May refer constitutional matters to the Constitutional Court
11. Exercises other executive functions, which are not assigned to other central or national institutions.

The competencies of the Prime minister are:

1. Represents and directs the Government
2. Ensures that all Ministries are acting in accordance with governmental policies
3. Ensures the implementation of laws and policies defined by the Government
4. Replaces the members of the Government without the consent of the Assembly
5. Heads the Security Council of Kosovo
6. Appoints the General Director of Kosovo Police
7. Consults with the President of the Republic of Kosovo on intelligence matters
8. Together with the President, appoints the Director, Deputy Director, and General Inspector of Kosovo Intelligence Agency, consults with the President on the implementation of foreign policy of the country
9. Carries out other duties provided for by the Constitution and law.
10. Executes judiciary

General Principles of the Judicial System in article 102, in constitution:

1. Judicial power in the Republic of Kosovo is exercised by the courts.
2. The judicial power is unique, independent, fair, apolitical and impartial and ensures equal access to the courts.
3. Courts shall adjudicate based on the Constitution and the law.
4. Judges shall be independent and impartial in exercising their functions.
5. The right to appeal a judicial decision is guaranteed unless otherwise provided by law.

The right to extraordinary legal remedies is regulated by law. The law may allow the right to refer a case directly to the Supreme Court, in which case there would be no right of appeal. Organization and Jurisdiction of Courts in article 103 of constitution:

1. Organization, functioning and jurisdiction of the Supreme Court and other courts shall be regulated by law.
2. The Supreme Court of Kosovo is the highest judicial authority.
3. At least 15% of the judges of the Supreme Court, but not fewer than three judges, shall be from Communities that are not in the majority in Kosovo.
4. The President of the Supreme Court of Kosovo shall be appointed and dismissed by the President of the Republic of Kosovo from among the judges of the Supreme Court for a non-renewable term of 7 years upon proposal by the Kosovo Judicial Council for the appointment or dismissal.
5. Presidents of all other courts shall be appointed in the manner provided by law.
6. At least 15% of the judges from any other court established with appeal jurisdiction, but not fewer than two 2 judges, shall be from Communities that are not in the majority in Kosovo.
7. Specialized courts may be established by law when necessary, but no extraordinary court may ever be created.

== Elementary provisions ==
=== Elementary Freedoms and Rights ===
Kosovo is a parliamentary democracy. The constitution and laws provide for the authorities and responsibilities of the freely elected unicameral national Assembly, the Assembly-approved government, and the Assembly-elected president. Kosovo accepted the Ahtisari plan, and provided for internationally sponsored mechanisms, including an International Civilian Office and the EU Rule of Law Mission (EULEX), to support the law and Government there.

Fundamental Rights and Freedoms are provided by the Constitution of Kosovo, in accordance with the Ahtisari Plan:

1. Human rights and fundamental freedoms are indivisible, inalienable and inviolable and are the basis of the legal order of the Republic of Kosovo.
2. The Republic of Kosovo protects and guarantees human rights and fundamental freedoms as provided by this Constitution.
3. Everyone must respect the human rights and fundamental freedoms of others.
4. Fundamental rights and freedoms set forth in the Constitution are also valid for legal persons to the extent applicable.

Human rights and fundamental freedoms guaranteed by the following international agreements and instruments are guaranteed by this Constitution, are directly applicable in the Republic of Kosovo and, in the case of conflict, have priority over provisions of laws and other acts of public institutions:

1. Universal Declaration of Human Rights;
2. European Convention for the Protection of Human Rights and Fundamental Freedoms and its Protocols;
3. International Covenant on Civil and Political Rights and its Protocols;
4. Council of Europe Framework Convention for the Protection of National Minorities;
5. Convention on the Elimination of All Forms of Racial Discrimination;
6. Convention on the Elimination of All Forms of Discrimination Against Women;
7. Convention on the Rights of the Child;
8. Convention against Torture and Other Cruel, Inhumane or Degrading Treatment or Punishment.

Other rights and freedom that took place on Constitution of Kosovo, such as: Human Dignity, Equality Before the Law, Right to Life, Right to Personal Integrity, Prohibition of Torture, Cruel, Inhuman or Degrading Treatment, Prohibition of Slavery and Forced Labor, Right to Liberty and Security, Rights of the Accused, Right to Fair and Impartial Trial, Right to Legal Remedies, The Principle of Legality and Proportionality in Criminal Cases, Right not to be Tried Twice for the Same Criminal Act, Freedom of Movement, Right to Privacy, Right to Marriage and Family, Freedom of Belief, Conscience and Religion, Religious Denominations, Freedom of Expression, Right of Access to Public Documents, Freedom of Media, Freedom of Gathering, Freedom of Association, Freedom of Election and Participation, Protection of Property, Right to Education, Freedom of Art and Science, Right to Work and Exercise Profession, Rights of Children, Health and Social Protection, Responsibility for the Environment, Interpretation of Human Rights Provisions, Judicial Protection of Rights, Limitations on Fundamental Rights and Freedoms and Fundamental Rights and Freedoms During a State of Emergency Constitution of Kosovo, chapter II.

=== Minority rights ===
Communities are defined as national, ethnic, cultural, linguistic or religious groups traditionally present in the Republic of Kosovo that are not in the majority. These groups are Serb, Turks, Bosnians, Roma, Ashkali, Egyptians, Gorani and other communities.

There is no consensus on the definition and characteristics of a 'minority', and this issue is often politically contested. Most commonly, a minority is considered a non-dominant group with an identity distinct from that of the majority population in a country. 'Minority rights' refer to group specific rights, in addition to general human rights and civil and political liberties, that any individual member of the minority can choose to enjoy. 'Minority protection' refers to the overall situational and policy framework in which these minority rights are embedded. Notably, minority protection will only be effective when both majority and minority groups have incentives to adhere to the established institutions and rights.

The people belonging to communities in the Republic of Kosovo are entitled to have individually or jointly with others the fundamental human rights and freedoms established in international legal obligations building upon the Republic of Kosovo. These rights and freedoms are guaranteed by the constitution, other laws, regulations and other state policies.

For the protection and promotion of the rights of communities and their members in the Republic of Kosovo, the Assembly of the Republic of Kosovo ratified the Law on Protection and Promotion of the Rights of Communities and their Members in the Republic of Kosovo.

Members of the community in the majority in the Republic of Kosovo, who as a whole are not in the majority in a given municipality, are also entitled to have the rights listed in this law. The authorities in the republic of Kosovo, including the courts, interpret this law in accordance with the guarantees of human rights and fundamental freedoms and the rights of communities and their members established in the Constitution of the Republic of Kosovo with applicable international human rights obligations including the provision of the Council of Europe Framework Convention for the Protection of National Minorities.

Communities and their members have the right to freely maintain, express, develop their culture and identity, and to preserve and enhance the essential elements of their identity, namely their religion, language, traditions and cultural heritage. In addition to the specific rights enumerated in this law, fundamental human rights shall be exercised freely and equally, including freedom of thought, of expression, of the media, of association and assembly, of religious belief and practice, and the right to manifest in private or in public, individually or in community with the others, the cultural attributes of the respective community.

The Republic of Kosovo shall create appropriate conditions that enable communities and their members to freely maintain, express and develop their identities.

According to this law, Albanian and Serbian languages and their alphabets are official languages of the Republic of Kosovo and have equal status in its institutions. The Turkish, Bosnian and Roma languages have the status of official languages at the municipal level or will be in official use in accordance with the Law on the Use of Languages. Persons belonging to communities have the right to use freely and without interference the language of their community in private and in public, orally and in writing. All persons belonging to communities have the right to receive public education at all levels, in one of the official languages of Kosovo of their choice.

The Government of the Republic of Kosovo takes the necessary measures to ensure that persons belonging to communities shall have equal access to health care without discrimination. Communities and their members have the right to effective participation in political decision-making at all levels of government, including the decisions of special importance for them or for the areas in which they live.

This law provides the establishment of a Community Consultative Council under the auspices of the President of the Republic of Kosovo. This council will assist in the organization and the articulation of the views of communities and their members in relation to legislation, public policies and programs of special importance to them. In addition, this council shall provide a form for consultation and coordination amongst communities and shall ensure the effective functioning of the community representative organizations according to a code of conduct to be adopted by the Community Consultative Council; and shall provide a mechanism for regular exchange between communities and state institutions.

Also, minority rights are well defined in Constitution of Kosovo in General principles of Chapter III:

1. Inhabitants belonging to the same national or ethnic, linguistic, or religious group traditionally present on the territory of the Republic of Kosovo (Communities) shall have specific rights as set forth in this Constitution in addition to the human rights and fundamental freedoms provided in chapter II of this Constitution.
2. Every member of a community shall have the right to freely choose to be treated or not to

be treated as such and no discrimination shall result from this choice or from the exercise of the rights that are connected to that choice.

1. Members of Communities shall have the right to freely express, foster and develop their identity and community attributes.
2. The exercise of these rights shall carry with it duties and responsibilities to act in accordance with the law of the Republic of Kosovo and shall not violate the rights of others. [Constitution ofKosovo, chapterIII]

Kosovo's declaration of independence has brought opportunities, and potential risks for the protection of minority rights and the rights of smaller minorities in Kosovo. As exercisers of executive power in newly independent Kosovo, the EU and the international community can help to facilitate the effective participation of minority communities in Kosovo, while also ensuring the guarantee of minority rights. [Filling the vacuum: Ensuring Protection and Legal Remedies for Minorities in Kosovo(2009)]

The Constitution of Kosovo gives additional rights and protections to communities and their members in Kosovo. These protections operate as a second-level protection, above and beyond the fundamental freedoms in Chapter 2:

"Responsibilities of the State:

1. The Republic of Kosovo ensures appropriate conditions enabling communities, and their

members to preserve, protect and develop their identities. The Government shall particularly support cultural initiatives from communities and their members, including through financial assistance.

1. The Republic of Kosovo shall promote a spirit of tolerance, dialogue and support reconciliation among communities and respect the standards set forth in the Council of Europe Framework Convention for the Protection of National Minorities and the European Charter for Regional or Minority Languages.
2. The Republic of Kosovo shall take all necessary measures to protect persons who may be subject to threats or acts of discrimination, hostility or violence as a result of their national, ethnic, cultural, linguistic or religious identity.
3. The Republic of Kosovo shall adopt adequate measures as may be necessary to promote, in all areas of economic, social, political and cultural life, full and effective equality among members of communities. Such measures shall not be considered to be an act of discrimination.
4. The Republic of Kosovo shall promote the preservation of the cultural and religious heritage of all communities as an integral part of the heritage of Kosovo. The Republic of Kosovo shall have a special duty to ensure an effective protection of the entirety of sites and monuments of cultural and religious significance to the communities." [The Constitution of Kosovo, Chapter III]

Also, The Constitution of Kosovo content: Rights of Communities and their Members, Consultative Council for Communities, Representation in Public Institutions Employment, Representation in the Institutions of Local Government.

The last Representation includes:

1. In municipalities where at least ten per cent (10%) of the residents belong to

Communities not in the majority in those municipalities, a post of Vice President of the Municipal Assembly for Communities shall be reserved for a representative of these communities.

1. The position of Vice President shall be held by the non-majority candidate who received the most votes on the open list of candidates for election to the Municipal Assembly.
2. The Vice President for Communities shall promote inter-Community dialogue and serve as formal focal point for addressing non-majority Communities' concerns and interests in meetings of the Assembly and its work. The Vice President shall also be responsible for reviewing claims by Communities or their members that the acts or decisions of the Municipal Assembly violate their constitutionally guaranteed rights. The Vice President shall refer such matters to the Municipal Assembly for its reconsideration of the act or decision.
3. In the event the Municipal Assembly chooses not to reconsider its act or decision, or the

Vice President deems the result, upon reconsideration, to still present a violation of a constitutionally guaranteed right, the Vice President may submit the matter directly to the Constitutional Court, which may decide whether or not to accept the matter for review.

1. In these municipalities, representation for non-majority Communities in the Republic of Kosovo in the municipal executive body is guaranteed.[Constitution of Kosovo, Article 62]

== Economic relations ==
In Kosovo, the Ahtisaari plan has three basic requirements relating to economic relations which must be included in the Constitution. The plan requires Kosovo to use only one currency as legal tender, to establish an independent central banking authority, and to establish market regulatory bodies.

Consequently, it is unclear what Kosovo's constitution should say on this subject. There is the general question as to how many specific details implementing the Ahtisaari requirements should be included, and there are the points mentioned in the above constitutions, which will need to be considered as well.

Economic relations in Constitution of Kosovo are summary in 4 articles. In General principle is:

1. The Republic of Kosovo shall ensure a favorable legal environment for a market economy, freedom of economic activity and safeguards for private and public property.
2. The Republic of Kosovo shall ensure equal legal rights for all domestic and foreign investors and enterprises.
3. Actions limiting free competition through the establishment or abuse of a dominant position or practices restricting competition are prohibited, unless explicitly allowed by law.
4. The Republic of Kosovo promotes the welfare of all of its citizens by fostering sustainable economic development.
5. The Republic of Kosovo shall establish independent market regulators where the market alone cannot sufficiently protect the public interest.
6. A foreign investor is guaranteed the right to freely transfer profit and invested capital outside the country in accordance with the law.
7. Consumer protection is guaranteed in accordance with the law.
8. Every person is required to pay taxes and other contributions as provided by law.
9. The Republic of Kosovo shall exercise its ownership function over any enterprise it controls consistently with the public interest, with a view to maximizing the long-term value of the enterprise.
10. Public service obligation may be imposed on such enterprises in accordance with the law, which shall also provide for a fair compensation. [Constitution of Kosovo, Chapter IX]

== Local governance ==
In Constitution of Kosovo, Local Government is illustrated in 2 articles:

Article 123 [General Principles]

1. The right to local self-government is guaranteed and is regulated by law.
2. Local self-government is exercised by representative bodies elected through general, equal, free, direct, and secret ballot elections.
3. The activity of local self-government bodies is based on this Constitution and the laws of the Republic of Kosovo and respects the European Charter of Local Self-Government. The Republic of Kosovo shall observe and implement the European Charter on Local Self Government to the same extent as that required of a signatory state.
4. Local self-government is based upon the principles of good governance, transparency, efficiency and effectiveness in providing public services having due regard for the specific needs and interests of the Communities not in the majority and their members."

Another article is: Local Self-Government Organization and Operation [Constitution of Kosovo, Chapter X]

== Security sector ==
The article concerning the security sector is defined in general as:

1. The Republic of Kosovo has authority over law enforcement, security, justice, public safety, intelligence, civil emergency response and border control within its territory.
2. Security institutions in the Republic of Kosovo shall protect public safety and the rights of all people in the Republic of Kosovo. The institutions shall operate in full transparency and in accordance with internationally recognized democratic standards and human rights.

Security institutions shall reflect the ethnic diversity of the population of the Republic of Kosovo.

1. The Republic of Kosovo fully respects all applicable international agreements and the relevant international law and cooperates with the international security bodies and regional counterparts.
2. Civilian and democratic control over security institutions shall be guaranteed.
3. The Assembly of the Republic of Kosovo oversees the budget and policies of the security institutions as provided by law.

Other articles talked about: Kosovo Security Force, Kosovo Security Council, Kosovo Police, Kosovo Intelligence Agency, Civilian Aviation Authority and State of Emergency. [Constitution of Kosovo, Chapter XI].

=== Police ===
Kosovo Police is the police law enforcement agency of the Republic of Kosovo. In the Constitution of Kosovo this security institution is defined:

1. The Police of the Republic of Kosovo shall be responsible for the preservation of public order and safety throughout the territory of the Republic of Kosovo.
2. The Police shall be professional and reflect the ethnic diversity of the population of the Republic of Kosovo.
3. The Prime Minister shall appoint the Police Director General of the Republic of Kosovo upon the recommendation of the Government and in accordance with law. Internal organization of the Kosovo Police shall be provided by law.
4. The Police of the Republic of Kosovo shall have a unified chain of command throughout the Republic of Kosovo with police stations corresponding to municipal boundaries. The Kosovo Police shall facilitate cooperation with municipal authorities and community leaders through the establishment of Local Councils as provided by law. Ethnic

composition of the police within a municipality shall reflect the ethnic composition of the population within the respective municipality to the highest extent possible.

1. The Police of the Republic of Kosovo shall be responsible for border control in direct cooperation with local and international authorities.

[Constitution of Kosovo, article 128]

=== FSK ===
The Kosovo Security Force (KSF) is an emergency response force charged with conducting operations in Kosovo and abroad in the areas of search and rescue, explosive ordnance disposal, firefighting, and hazardous material disposal. It is widely assumed that the KSF will take on an additional defense role after a governmental review of the organization in 2013. The Commander of the KSF is Lieutenant General Kadri Kastrati.

In the Constitution of Kosovo this security institution is regulated by the article:

1. The Security Council of the Republic of Kosovo in cooperation with the President of the Republic of Kosovo and the Government develops the security strategy for the Republic of Kosovo. The Security Council of the Republic of Kosovo shall also have an advisory role on all matters relating to security in the Republic of Kosovo.
2. The Security Council of the Republic of Kosovo shall be chaired by the Prime Minister with the support of the Government, except during a State of Emergency as provided by this Constitution.
3. The President of the Republic of Kosovo may require meetings of the Security Council of the Republic of Kosovo and the council is obliged to closely coordinate its work with the President. The Security Council of the Republic of Kosovo shall closely cooperate with international authorities.
4. Members of the Security Council of the Republic of Kosovo shall be appointed and dismissed in a manner provided for by law. [Constitution of Kosovo, article 126].

=== AKI ===
The AKI concerns the need for timely and accurate information about intelligence, counterintelligence, domestic and foreign threats, international or domestic terrorism, narcotics production and trafficking, organized crime, economic crime, sabotage and all other intelligence issues related to Kosovo security.

It is also concerns all reasonable and lawful means being used to ensure that Kosovo receives the best intelligence available. For that purpose, the Kosovo Intelligence Agency shall be established with the purpose of collecting, analysing and disseminating this intelligence in a vigorous and responsible manner. In Constitution of Kosovo this Security institution is adjusted:

1. The Kosovo Intelligence Agency shall identify, investigate and monitor threats to security in the Republic of Kosovo.
2. The Kosovo Intelligence Agency shall be professional, politically impartial, multi-ethnic and shall be subject to Assembly oversight in a manner provided by law.
3. The President of the Republic of Kosovo and the Prime Minister, upon consultation with the Government, shall jointly appoint the Director, Deputy Director and Inspector General of Kosovo Intelligence Agency. Qualifications and terms of office shall be determined by law.
4. The President of the Republic of Kosovo and the Prime Minister shall receive the same intelligence information.

[Constitution of Kosovo, article 129]

== Independent institutions ==
The independent institutions of the Republic of Kosovo are represented by:

Ombudsperson – Articles 132–135

1- Ombudsperson of Kosovo is Mr. Sami Kurteshi. Office of the Ombudsperson is independent. The Ombudsman is responsible for the supervision and protection of freedoms and rights of individuals, if these are violated by public authorities. Ombudsman is independent, and one or more vice. The Ombudsman is elected by the Assembly of Kosovo. Ombudsperson and his deputies are not allowed to be a part of any party political party. Also a particular significance in the choice of the Ombudsman has the person's character, his moral and other values which include experience and knowledge in the field of human rights. The report of the Ombudsman is every year to the Assembly of the Republic of Kosovo, or even more if it's deemed reasonable by the Assembly.

Auditor-General – Article 136–138

2- Auditor-General of Kosovo is the institution which controls the economic and financial flow of the state. The Auditor General also Ombudsman is elected by the Assembly of the Republic of Kosovo, the discharge of the Auditor-General can be made from the same body. The Auditor General has responsibility for the control of economic activities for the public institutions, the use and protection of public funds, public enterprises and economic activities of other legal persons. The report of The Auditor General is once a year for the Assembly.

Central Election Commission – Article 139

3- It is the body which prepares, supervises, directs, and verifies all activities that have to do with the election process. This institution is composed of 11 members in total. The special part of this institution is the Head of the institution that is appointed by the President of the Republic of Kosovo. This institution has reserved places for minorities, 1 for the Serbian minority and 3 seats for other minorities in Kosovo. Other places are reserved for the Albanian majority community.

Central Bank of Kosovo – Article 140

4- It is an independent institution which reports to the Assembly of Kosovo. This institution shall exercise the powers only in accordance with the constitution of the Republic of Kosovo. The special part of this institution is that the Governor of the Bank also possesses post as Executive Chief.

Independent Media Commission – Article 141

5- Is an independent institution and regulates the broadcasting frequencies spectrum licenses for public and private broadcasters, also it is responsible for the definition and implementation of e all transmission policy based on the law. Members are elected by the law, through a transparent process.

Independent agencies – Article 141

6- They are institutions created directly by the Assembly. They are regulated and established, functioning and competences based on their own budget and in accordance with the law. It is obliged that they cooperate with other independent agencies.

== Provisions ==
=== Final provisions ===
Final provisions are based on three articles, (143–145) of the Constitution and are basic guidelines for the Republic of Kosovo to respect the obligations under the Proposal for the Kosovo's Status Settlement on 26 March 2007, obligations and the how to amend the Constitution in the future and the protection of international agreements and also the legislation that was in place before the Constitution was adopted.

For more information about specific amendment changes and differentiations visit.

=== Transitional provisions ===
Transitional provisions are based on eighteen articles of the Constitution (146–164).

1. First two articles – 146 and 147 explain the authorities, privileges and legal capacities of the International Civilian Representatives as mandated under the Comprehensive Proposal for the Kosovo Status settlement of 26 March 2007.

2. Second two articles – 148 and 149 deal with the construction of the assembly (in first two elections mandates), creating reserved seats for its minorities in the process and the adoption of the vital laws with the majority vote present.

3. The next three articles – 150 to 152, are constructed to deal with the judiciary system in this manner. Articles deal with the composition of the judiciary council, the appointment and reappointment of judges and the composition of the Constitutional Court.

4. The next two articles – 153 and 154, decree the powers of the international and national corps. The power of the international military presence and authorities that they wield by the Council Resolution 1244 and the Comprehensive Proposal for the Kosovo Status Settlement dated 26 March 2007 and the authorities of the International military presence over the Kosovo Protection Corps until their development within one year after entry into force of this Constitution.

5. The next two articles – 155 and 156, deal with the question of who is a citizen and the rights of displaced persons to their properties.

6. The next two articles – 159 and 160, deal with the ownership of the social and public enterprises, the privatization process and the rights of the state and the municipalities to own enterprises by law.

7. Article 161 – deals with the transitional institutions like, Kosovo's Judicial Council that will be replaced by the Kosovo Prosecution Council when it is established.

8. The last article – 162 is the date of entry into force of the Constitution, 15 June 2008.

Article 162 [Effective Date] This Constitution shall enter into force and effect on 15 June 2008.

== Opinions ==
=== International consensus ===
==== United States ====
On 10 September 2012, President Barack Obama said: Kosovo has made "significant progress" in "building the institutions of a modern, multi-ethnic, inclusive and democratic state." Kosovo had more work to do in ensuring that the rights enshrined in the country's constitution are realized for every citizen.

Judge John Tunheim of the United States District Court for the District of Minnesota, said, "At the outset of the constitutional development process in March 2007, Kosovo had a number of very important goals. The first goal was to draft a document that would be broadly acceptable to the people of Kosovo—a document that not only "belonged" to Kosovo, but also was acceptable and impressive to the rest of the world. The second goal was to provide a constitution that would help ensure broad international acceptance of the new country and quick recognition of Kosovo's independence".

==== Other ====
Pieter Feith, an EU special representative who is chairing an International Civilian Office there, said, "Kosovo will have a modern constitution guaranteeing full respect of individual and community rights, including those of Kosovo Serbs".

President Fatmir Sejdiu said: "Serbs are the citizens of Kosovo. This constitution is also theirs".
