= 2026 Kosovan presidential election =

- 6 October 2026

Nominee	Justina Shiroka Pula	Eliza Hoxha
Party	Independent	PDK
Electoral vote	81	1
Percentage	98.78%	1.22%
President before election
Albulena Haxhiu (acting) (Note: Albulena Haxhiu became Acting President on 4 April, following the failure to elect a president on 5 March and the start of the 60-day constitutional period for completing the election process. This period expired on 7 October.)
LVV
Elected President
Justina Shiroka Pula
Independent

The Assembly of Kosovo held an indirect election for president on 6 October 2026.

Under Article 86 of the Constitution of Kosovo, the Assembly must elect a president no later than 30 days before the end of the incumbent's term.

An initial attempt on 5 March 2026 failed due to lack of quorum, opening a 34-day constitutional window. President Vjosa Osmani dissolved the Assembly the next day and moved toward snap elections; Vetëvendosje challenged the decree. On 9 March the Constitutional Court suspended it. On 25 March the Court ruled the dissolution had no legal effect and gave the Assembly until 28 April to elect a president.

Osmani's term expired on 4 April. Assembly Speaker Albulena Haxhiu (LVV) became acting president for up to six months. A second attempt around 27–28 April was boycotted by the main opposition parties (PDK, LDK, AAK), who called it a "propaganda show." The Assembly again failed to elect a president by the Court's deadline and was dissolved. Haxhiu called for snap parliamentary elections for 7 June 2026.

Vetëvendosje and its allies once again won a majority in the June election but still lacked the two-thirds support needed for a president. On 31 August, LVV and LDK agreed to nominate Bekim Sejdiu (former Constitutional Court judge, diplomat, and law professor) as a consensus candidate. Internal LDK opposition (six MPs) immediately blocked the required 80-vote quorum in the first two rounds (or 61 in a third). LDK leader Lumir Abdixhiku later indicated the rejection pointed toward new snap elections.

== Background ==
Incumbent president Vjosa Osmani took office on 4 April 2021, and her five-year term ended on 4 April 2026. Under the Constitution, she was eligible to seek one further term.

Instead of nominating her, on 4 March 2026, Vetëvendosje nominated Glauk Konjufca as its presidential candidate ahead of the Assembly session. No other party submitted a candidate. Speaker of the Assembly Albulena Haxhiu said that a session to elect the president could not be called without at least two candidates. Opposition parties, including the LDK, PDK and AAK, rejected Vetëvendosje's approach and called instead for a consensual candidate, contributing to the deadlock that led to the failed 5 March session.

=== Proposed constitutional amendments ===
On 5 March 2026, amid the deadlock over the presidential election, President Vjosa Osmani submitted constitutional amendments that would have changed the method of electing the president from an Assembly vote to direct popular election. The proposal was based on earlier draft amendments prepared in 2011. Vetëvendosje supported the initiative, and the Assembly's Committee on Legislation approved sending it forward, but opposition parties criticised the move and argued that such changes could not be adopted through a rushed procedure. Because constitutional amendments in Kosovo require a two-thirds majority of all deputies, including two-thirds of deputies holding reserved or guaranteed seats for non-majority communities, the proposal faced long odds. Later that day, the Assembly failed to vote on the amendments because there was no quorum.

=== Constitutional Court ruling and April 28 deadline ===
After the Constitutional Court's ruling of 25 March 2026, which invalidated the dissolution of the Assembly, lawmakers were given until 28 April 2026 to complete the presidential election. Although the Assembly retained that deadline, President Vjosa Osmani's term ended on 4 April 2026. Under Kosovo's constitutional arrangements, Speaker of the Assembly Albulena Haxhiu then assumed the office of acting president until a new president is elected. The Court's ruling also restored the Assembly's role in continuing the interrupted election process.

=== Albulena Haxhiu as Acting President ===
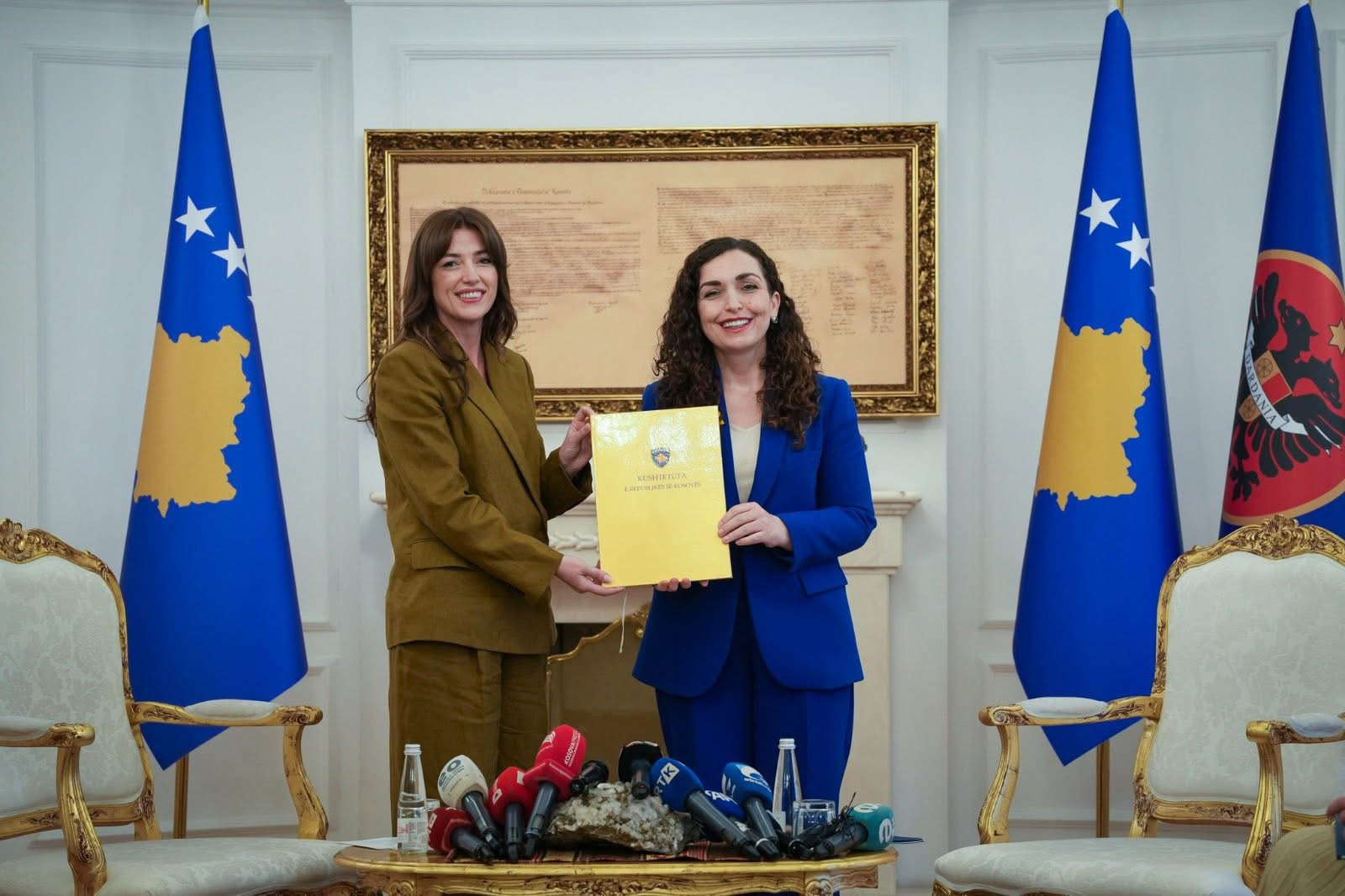
Albulena Haxhiu assumes the duties of Acting President of Kosovo on 4 April 2026, after the expiration of Vjosa Osmani's presidential term.

On 4 April 2026, Vjosa Osmani's five-year term as president ended, and Speaker of the Assembly Albulena Haxhiu became acting president in accordance with Kosovo's constitutional procedure. She will remain in office until the Assembly elects a new president, for up to six months if necessary. The Constitutional Court had previously set 28 April 2026 as the deadline for the Assembly to complete the presidential election. Haxhiu said she would exercise the office in accordance with the Constitution and in the public interest.

On 3 September 2026, as Haxhiu's constitutional six-month mandate neared its expiration on 4 October, the Presidency of Kosovo clarified the institutional succession path. The office stated that the country cannot remain without an acting head of state and announced that once the 11th legislature of the Assembly is fully constituted, the role of acting president will automatically transfer to the newly elected Speaker of the Assembly until a full-term president is officially chosen. Furthermore, the Presidency noted that it remained open to requesting a legal clarification from the Constitutional Court if the Assembly fails to elect a new president by the 4 October deadline.

== Electoral system ==
Initially, a candidate is required to receive at least 80 votes, equivalent to two-thirds of the 120 members of the Assembly, in order to be elected. However, if no candidate succeeds during the first two rounds, a third round is held between the top two candidates of the second round, and the requirement is reduced to a simple majority of 61 votes. If the third round also does not produce a successful candidate, the Assembly is dissolved, with new elections to take place within 45 days.

Article 86 states that the election of the President shall take place no later than 30 days before the end of the current president's term of office. Additionally, Article 82 also states that the Assembly will dissolve if they do not elect a President within 60 days from the date of the beginning of the president's election procedure. With the inaugural voting session having convened on 5 March, this 60-day countdown has been officially activated.

Following the unsuccessful parliamentary session on 5 March due to a lack of a quorum, Lëvizja Vetëvendosje formally petitioned the Constitutional Court of Kosovo to impose a temporary measure suspending these strict constitutional deadlines until the court issues a final judgment. The party argued that the intentional obstruction of the quorum by members of parliament who refused to participate constitutes a constitutional violation. In their request, they asked the court to mandate that all deputies have a binding obligation to participate in the presidential vote—whether voting in favor, against, or abstaining—to prevent the country from being forced into early legislative elections due to political blockades. On 30 March, the Constitutional Court rejected Vetëvendosje's request and declined to impose an interim measure, thereby determining that deputies are not obliged to remain in the parliament for the presidential vote.

Despite securing 74 votes for Bekim Sejdiu, the coalition fell short of the 80-deputy quorum required by Article 86, allowing just six dissenting LDK MPs to block the election.

== Candidates ==
=== Confirmed candidates ===
- On 4 March 2026, news outlets reported that the PDK had proposed Justina Shiroka Pula, President of the Academy of Sciences and Arts, as a potential candidate for president. However, both Pula and PDK leadership later denied the claims.

Independent
For President
Justina Shiroka Pula
Signatures for candidacy
30/120 (25%)

Democratic Party of Kosovo
For President
Eliza Hoxha
Signatures for candidacy
30/120 (25%)

=== Candidates from the previous legislature ===
On 27 April, following the withdrawal of Glauk Konjufca and Fatmire Kollçaku from the candidacy, the Speaker of the Assembly Albulena Haxhiu, announced that Vetëvendosje has proposed two candidates, Feride Rushiti and Hatixhe Hoxha. Based on electoral rules, both candidates are no longer considered candidates because the parliament has been dissolved, and Legislature X which had the responsibility to elect the president, failed to fulfill this duty, leaving it to the next legislature to carry out the election of the president.

Independent
For President
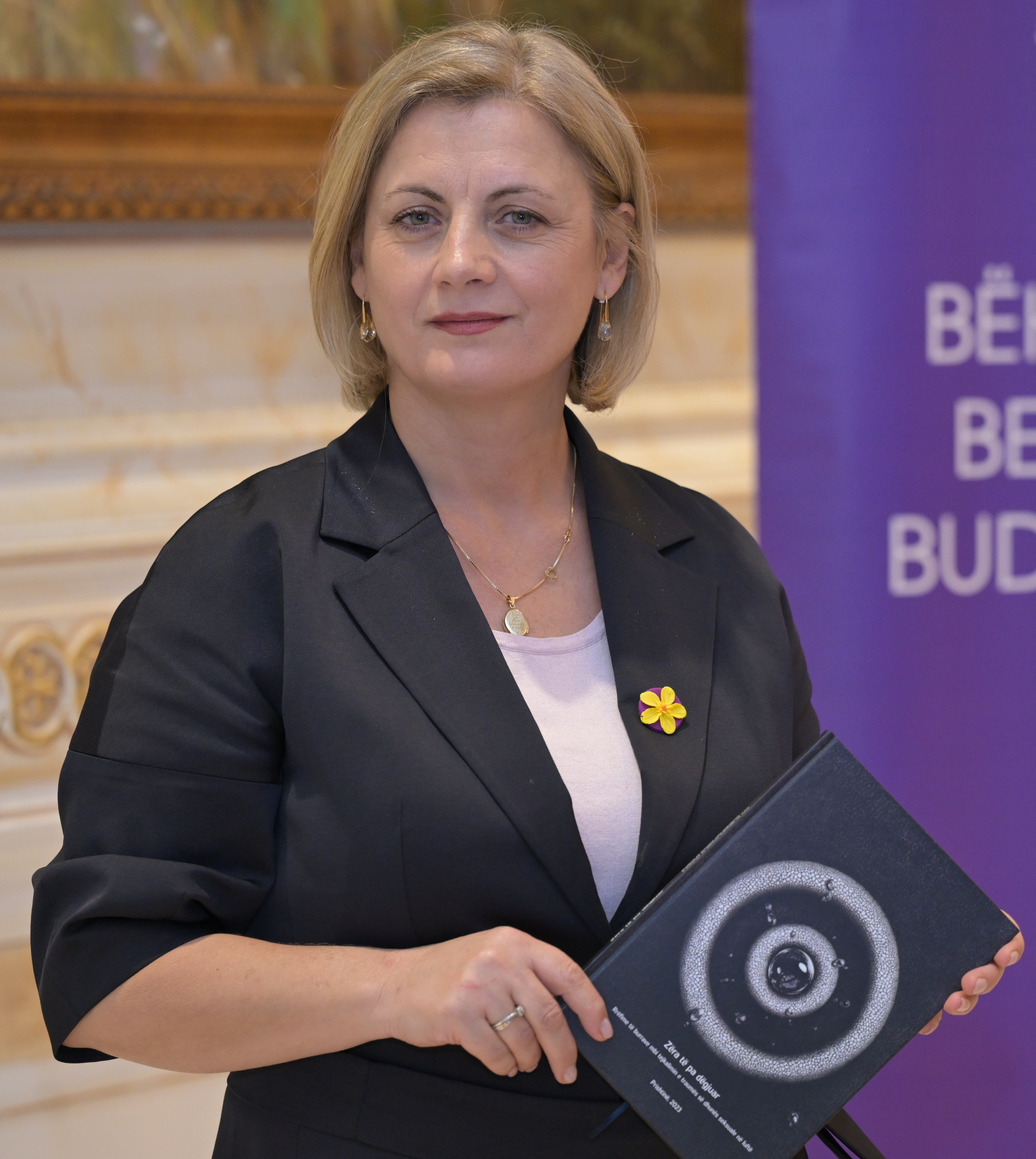
Feride Rushiti
Signatures for candidacy
30/120 (25%)

Vetëvendosje
For President
Hatixhe Hoxha
Signatures for candidacy
30/120 (25%)

=== Withdrawn ===
- On 3 March, according to media in Kosovo, Prime Minister Albin Kurti is expected to nominate Glauk Konjufca for president. On 4 March, Vetëvendosje nominated the Minister of Foreign Affairs, Glauk Konjufca, for President of Kosovo.
- On 5 March, Vetëvendosje also nominated its second candidate, Fatmire Mullhaxha-Kollçaku, who received 34 signatures for her candidacy.
- On 27 April, Glauk Konjufca and Fatmire Mullhaxha Kollçaku withdrew from their candidacies for President of Kosovo.
- On 29 August, reports emerged of a possible agreement between Vetëvendosje (VV) and the Democratic League of Kosovo (LDK) on the election of Bekim Sejdiu as President of Kosovo. On 31 August, after numerous meetings and discussions between the LDK and LVV, an agreement was reached that Bekim Sejdiu would be the candidate for president. On 1 September, one day after the agreement to select Bekim Sejdiu as the consensus candidate for President, six LDK MPs declared that they would neither vote for him nor participate in the parliamentary session to establish the required quorum. Acting Prime Minister Albin Kurti described the move as a "negative announcement," labeling the behavior of the six LDK MPs "absurd and irresponsible", warning that it could lead to harmful new elections. On 2 September, LDK leader Lumir Abdixhiku stated that there was no broader governing agreement with LVV since LDK had decided to remain in opposition, and clarified that the rejection of Sejdiu candidacy definitively sealed the country's fate, leading toward new snap elections. On 14 September, Bekim Sejdiu stated: "Given the circumstances, characterized by the lack of the necessary parliamentary support for my election as President and the entire process being drawn into a vortex of internal political dynamics and conflicts, I have decided to withdraw my candidacy for President of the Republic of Kosovo."

Vetëvendosje
For President
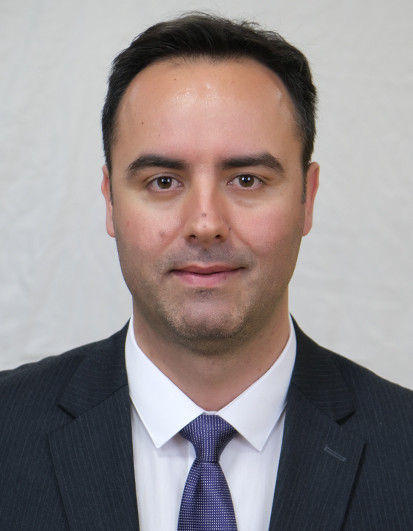
Glauk Konjufca
Minister of Foreign Affairs
Signatures for candidacy
30/120 (25%)

Vetëvendosje
For President
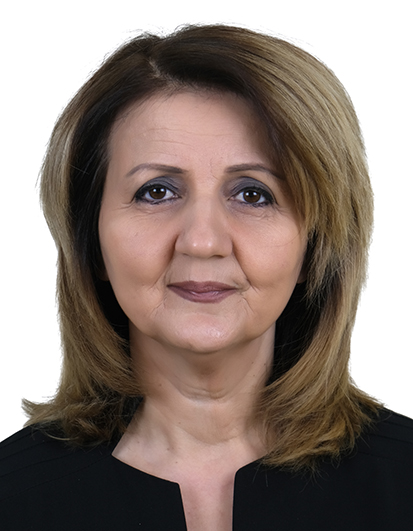
Fatmire Kollçaku
Member of Assembly
Signatures for candidacy
34/120 (28%)

Independent
For President
Bekim Sejdiu

=== Expressed interest ===
- On 1 January 2026, the current President, Vjosa Osmani, announced that she would seek the confidence of the Members of Parliament for a second term. In her statement, she emphasized her commitment to continuing the institutional reforms she has initiated and to further strengthening democracy, the rule of law, and Kosovo's international standing. On 25 April, the leader of the LDK Lumir Abdixhiku asked the Prime Minister Kurti for the 66 votes of the parliamentary majority in support of Vjosa Osmani, promising that 15 LDK MPs would support her as a candidate, but did not receive support from VV.
- On 5 March, the lawyer Arianit Koci, who was a harsh voice during the 2025 Kosovo political deadlock, asked to be nominated as a candidate for president, without seeking votes from anyone, but with the sole aim of avoiding the crisis and the possible elections that could occur if the president is not elected.
Individuals who have expressed an interest in running for Kosovan Presidential Election
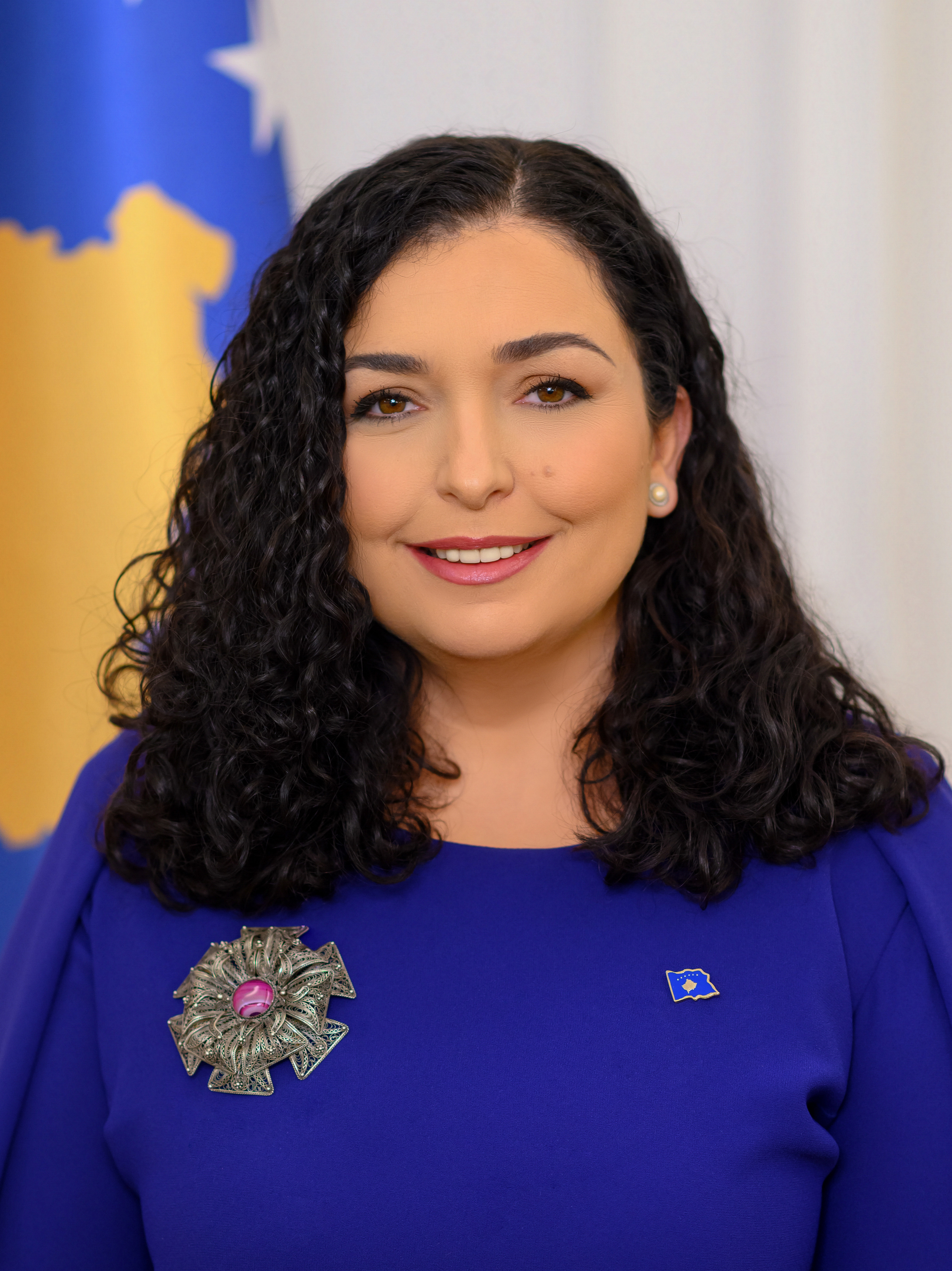
Former President
Vjosa Osmani
(2021–26)

Lawyer
Arianit Koci

=== Speculated by the media ===
- On 3 March 2026, media outlets reported that publicist and former politician Veton Surroi is being reconsidered as a potential candidate for president.
- On 3 March 2026, media outlets reported that the PDK has considered proposing surgeon Shqiptar Demaçi, the son of activist Adem Demaçi, as a potential candidate for president.
- On 4 March 2026, media reported that VV has considered proposing Andin Hoti, the son of activist Ukshin Hoti, as a potential candidate for president, reportedly offering the PDK the opportunity to support his nomination.
- On 4 March, media speculation also increased that the former President of Kosovo, Atifete Jahjaga, could be a consensual candidate for president, as she is be eligible to serve a second and final term.
- On 26 August, William G. Walker, a highly prominent figure in Kosovo, addressed a letter to political parties urging them to elect Faton Bislimi as a consensus president.
- On 27 August, a day after the meeting between Albin Kurti and Lumir Abdixhiku aimed at finding a consensus candidate for president, former Minister of Defence Nikë Gjeloshi was mentioned as a potential candidate. However, Gjeloshi has denied being contacted by any political party regarding the presidency. He said that, if political parties consider him the ideal candidate for the position, he would be willing to take on the responsibility.

Potential candidates
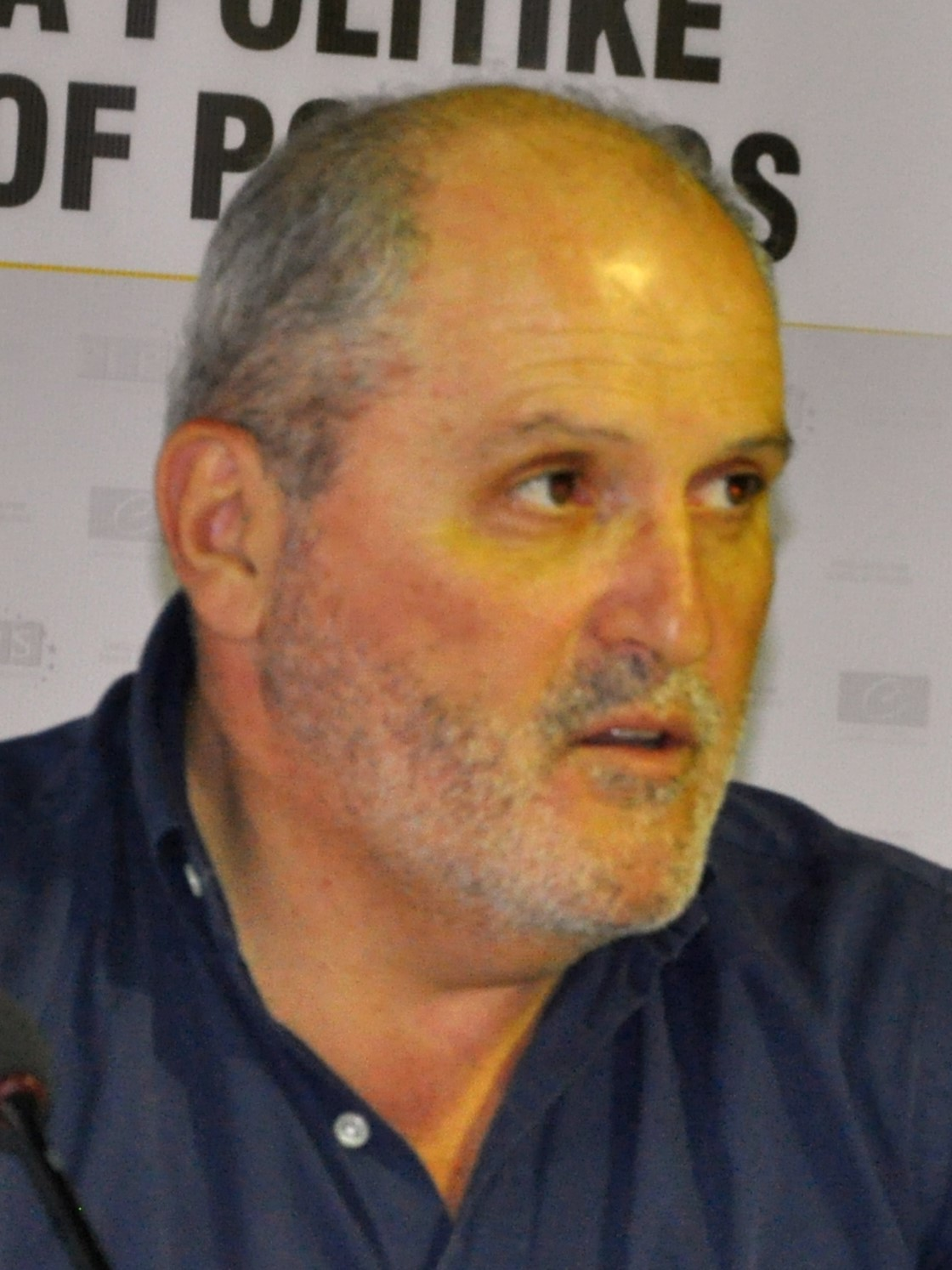
Former Member of the Parliament
Veton Surroi
(2004–2007)

Surgeon; son of Adem Demaçi
Shqiptar Demaçi

Minister for Labour, Family, Social Welfare and Values of the Liberation War
Andin Hoti
(2026–present)

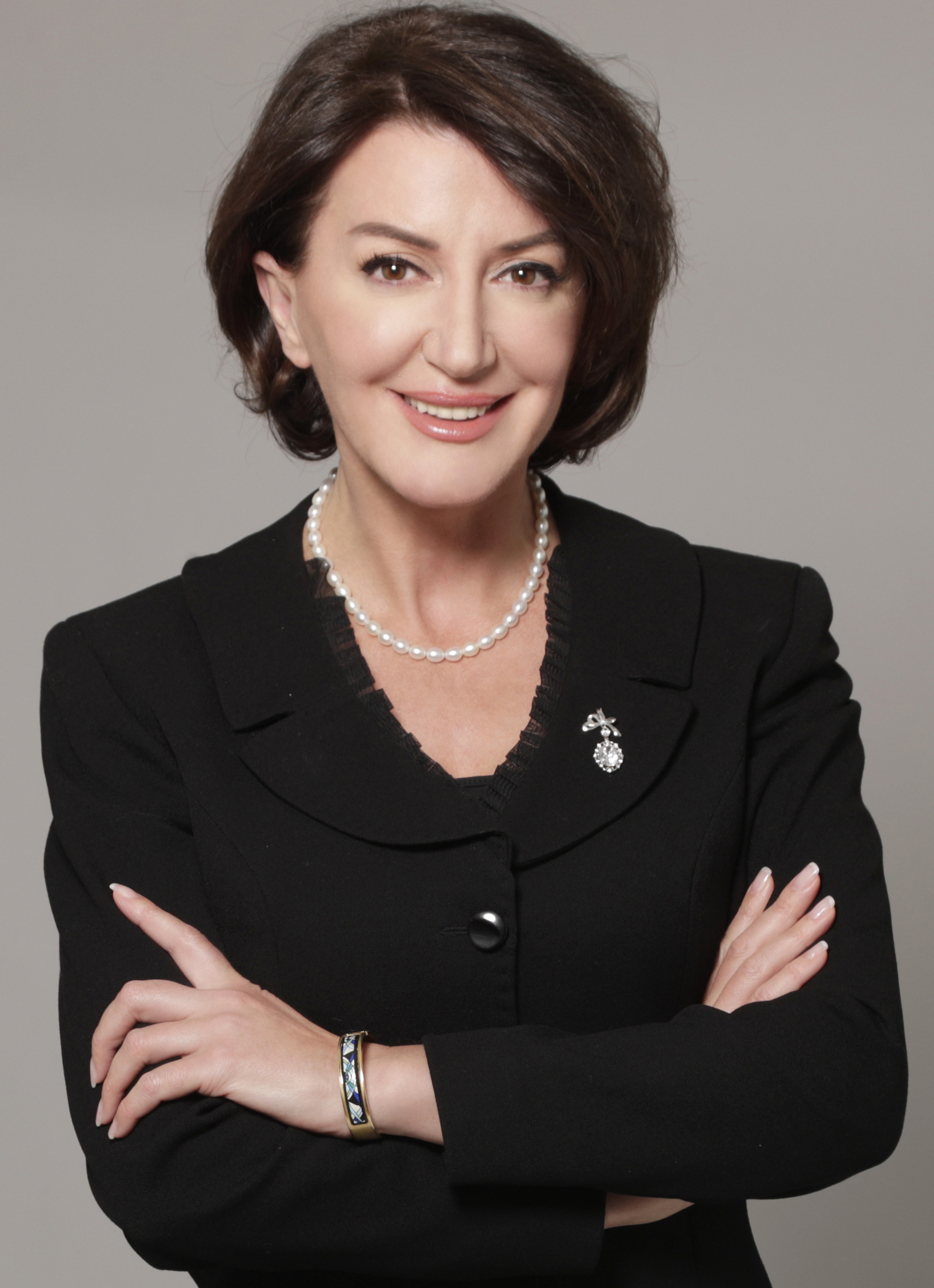
Former President of Kosovo
Atifete Jahjaga
(2011–2016)

Former Member of the Parliament
Faton Bislimi
(2019–2021)

Former Minister of Defence
Nikë Gjeloshi
(1991–1995)

=== Declined ===
- On 13 January 2026, several media outlets reported that a potential candidate of Vetëvendosje! for President of Kosovo could be Bekim Jashari, former mayor of Skenderaj and nephew of one of the founders of the Kosovo Liberation Army, Adem Jashari.
- On 23 February 2026, Kosovar-American businessman Harry Bajraktari (born Hajdar Bajraktari) denied media reports claiming that he was lobbying to become President of Kosovo. He described the allegations as untrue and stated that he continues to support President Vjosa Osmani and has not expressed interest in running for president.
- On 25 February 2026, Murat Jashari of the Jashari family stated that neither he nor any other family member is interested in becoming President of Kosovo. Bekim Jashari also reiterated this position, stating that he had nothing to add to Murat Jashari's remarks and dismissing any speculation about a presidential candidacy.
- On 26 February 2026, former Prime Minister Ramush Haradinaj stated that he is not a candidate for president and does not have the 30 out of 120 signatures required to nominate him.
- On 26 February 2026, former Minister of Education, Science and Technology, Arsim Bajrami, announced his candidacy for president and addressed the leaders of the Albanian political parties to seek their support. On 4 March, Bajrami withdrew his candidacy, considering that both parties, PDK and VV, were not interested in a consensual candidate.
- On 7 January 2026, following the parliamentary elections, several local media outlets reported that discussions are underway between LDK and VV, that Ibrahim Rugova's son, Uka, could be a potential candidate for either president or Speaker of the Assembly.On 25 August, Ukë Rugova stated that LDK will soon announce its presidential candidates, confirming that he will not be among them.
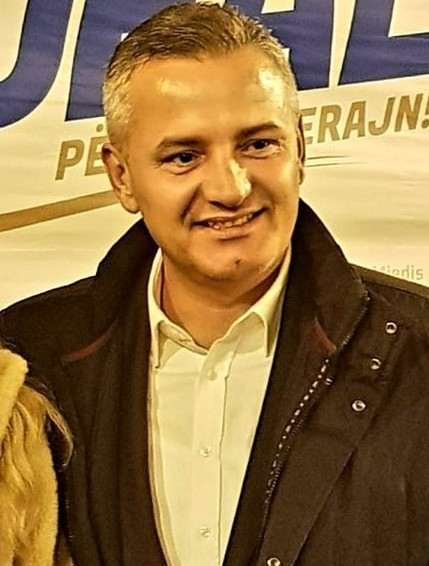
Former Mayor of Skenderaj
Bekim Jashari
(2017–2021)

Kosovar-American businessman
Hajdar "Harry" Bajraktari

Associate professor of University of Pristina
Murat Jashari

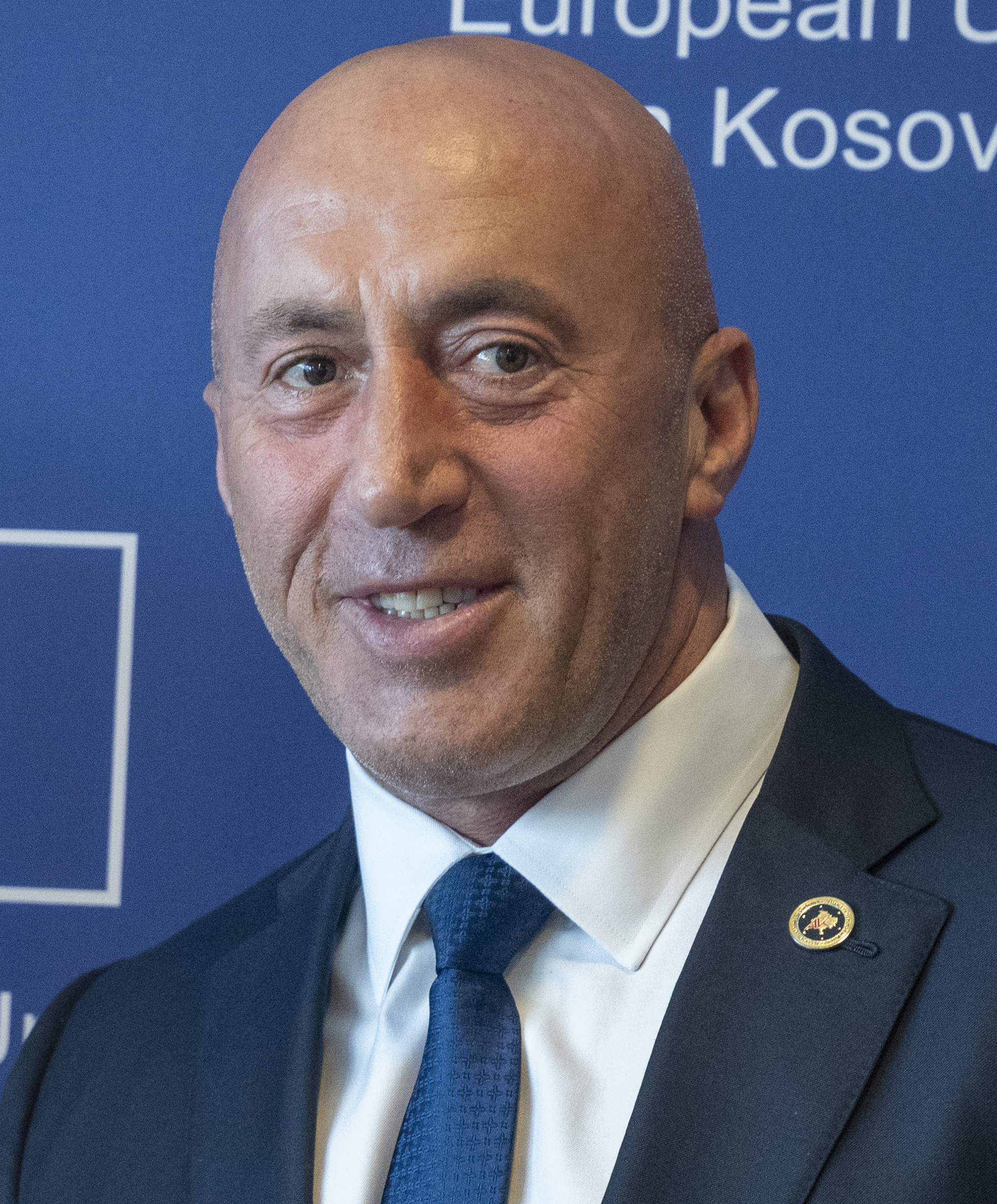
Former Prime Minister
Ramush Haradinaj
(2004–2005; 2017–2020)

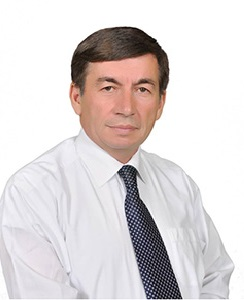
Former Minister of Education, Science and Technology
Arsim Bajrami
(2011–2014)

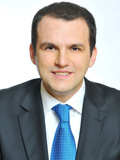
Member of Parliament
Ukë Rugova
(2010–2014; 2026–present)

== Results ==
First attempt (Legislature X)

The first attempt to elect the president took place on 5 March 2026. Lawmakers from the Democratic Party of Kosovo (PDK) walked out of the parliamentary session, preventing the quorum required for the election. The Democratic League of Kosovo (LDK) also refused to participate, with leader Lumir Abdixhiku stating that the country was heading toward a new election cycle. Only 66 deputies remained in the chamber, failing to meet the minimum of 80 required for a quorum, leading to the suspension of the session.

Second attempt (Legislature X)

A second attempt to elect the president took place on 27 April 2026. Ahead of the session, the LDK, PDK, and AAK maintained a united opposition boycott, effectively preventing a quorum. The LDK reiterated its stance that the vote was a "propaganda show," while the PDK and AAK criticized the lack of political consensus and "seriousness" surrounding the session. Despite the lack of quorum, a voting round took place which resulted in 63 ballots being cast for Feride Rushiti, one invalid vote, and zero votes for Hatixhe Hoxha.

First round (1st attempt) (5 March)				First round (2nd attempt) (27 April)				
Candidate	Party	Votes	%	Candidate	Party	Votes	%	Result
Glauk Konjufca	Vetëvendosje	No quorum		Feride Rushiti	Independent	63	98.44	No quorum
Fatmire Mullhaxha Kollçaku	Vetëvendosje	No quorum		Hatixhe Hoxha	Vetëvendosje	0	0.00	No quorum
Invalid/blank votes		—		Invalid/blank votes		1	1.56	No quorum
Total ballots cast		66		Total ballots cast		64	100%	—
Registered voters/turnout		120	55.0%	Registered voters/turnout		120	53.3%	

(Legislature XI)

Candidate	Party	Votes	%
Justina Shiroka Pula	Independent	81	98.78
Eliza Hoxha	PDK	1	1.22
Total		82	100.00
Valid votes		82	97.62
Invalid/blank votes		2	2.38
Total votes		84	100.00
Registered voters/turnout		120	70.00

== Leadership approval ==
=== Vjosa Osmani ===
The polls below asked voters for their opinion of Vjosa Osmani, president of Kosovo from April 2021 until April 2026.

Pollster	Date	Approve	Disapprove	Lead
UBO Consulting	23 June 2025	62.1	33.6	28.5
UNDP	25 July 2024	69.0	31.0	38.0
Albanian Post	28 June 2024	67.8	32.2	35.6
UNDP	28 February 2024	56.2	43.8	12.4
UNDP	25 April 2023	60.3	39.7	20.6

== Aftermath ==
After the Assembly failed to elect a president on 5 March 2026 because only 66 deputies were present, President Vjosa Osmani issued a decree on 6 March dissolving the Assembly and opening the way for snap parliamentary elections. Prime Minister Albin Kurti and Vetëvendosje challenged the decree before the Constitutional Court, arguing that the Assembly still had time to complete the presidential election process under the Constitution. On 9 March, the Court suspended the decree pending review. On 25 March, it ruled that the decree had no legal effect and gave the Assembly 34 days, until 28 April 2026, to elect a president.

=== International reactions ===
- Albania: President Bajram Begaj congratulated Shiroka Pula on her election, stating that Albania and Kosovo would stand together in every challenge and on every step toward their European future.
- Austria: President Alexander Van der Bellen conveyed his greetings and appreciation for the deep relations between Kosovo and Austria in the political, economic and cultural fields, as well as the strong people-to-people ties between the two countries. He expressed his appreciation for the important role of the Kosovo diaspora in Austria.
- Bulgaria: President Iliana Iotova extends her sincerest wishes and congratulations, expressing appreciation for President Shiroka Pula’s vision for the future of the region and the shared European values which, in her view, strengthen the development of bilateral relations between the two countries.
- Croatia: President Zoran Milanović congratulated Shiroka-Pula and assured her that Croatia would continue to support Kosovo’s integration into international organizations and regional cooperation formats, with particular emphasis on membership in the European Union and NATO. He also expressed hope for an early opportunity to meet in person and exchange views on the prospects for further developing bilateral relations, among other things, in his congratulatory letter.
- European Union: The EU Office in Pristina reacted to the political developments by emphasizing that the "normal functioning of institutions" is a prerequisite for Kosovo to benefit from the Western Balkans Growth Plan. While not naming the presidential process directly, spokesperson Nikola Gaon urged all political forces to implement the Constitution to ensure institutional stability.
- Finland: President Alexander Stubb congratulated Shiroka-Pula on her successful discharge of duties, expressing his willingness to continue cooperation in support of peace, stability, democracy, and European integration.
- France: President Emmanuel Macron conveyed his warmest congratulations to President Shiroka Pula and expressed hope that her election would enable the resumption of progress in areas that contribute to Kosovo’s European perspective.
- Germany: The German Embassy in Pristina stated that it was following the ongoing developments closely. Embassy official Catalina Heine emphasized that Germany "expects all actors to act in accordance with the Constitution" during the election process. On 9 November 2026, President Frank-Walter Steinmeier expressed his best wishes to President Shiroka Pula, on his own behalf and on behalf of the German people, while emphasizing the importance of the full functioning of Kosovo’s institutions.
- Hungary: President András Baka reaffirmed Hungary’s support for Kosovo’s Euro-Atlantic integration and its efforts to promote stability, peace, and economic prosperity in the region. He also highlighted Hungary’s continued military contribution to the NATO-led Kosovo Force (KFOR).
- Italy: President Sergio Mattarella expressed his desire for cooperation between the two countries to gain new momentum and deepen further, in line with Italy’s continued commitment to supporting Kosovo, demonstrated also by its participation in the KFOR mission, whose command Italy will soon assume once again.
- Jordan: King Abdullah II on behalf of the people and Government of Jordan, conveyed his heartfelt congratulations and best wishes to President Shiroka Pula for success in her new role.
- Latvia: President Edgars Rinkēvičs praised the friendly relations between Latvia and Kosovo and reaffirmed his country’s commitment to strengthening security and stability in the Western Balkans.
- Montenegro: President Jakov Milatović conveyed his best wishes to President Shiroka Pula, expressing his conviction that good-neighbourly relations between Kosovo and Montenegro will continue to deepen further through cooperation in areas of mutual interest.
- Netherlands: King Willem-Alexander expressed his belief that bilateral relations between Kosovo and the Netherlands will continue to develop for the benefit of both peoples, as well as his willingness to continue close cooperation between the two countries.
- North Macedonia: President Gordana Siljanovska-Davkova said she looks forward to working closely with Shiroka Pula to further strengthen bilateral relations, promote regional stability, and advance shared European futures.
- Qatar: Emir Tamim bin Hamad Al Thani congratulated Shiroka Pula, wishing her success in carrying out her duties and expressing his hope for further development and progress in relations between the two countries.
- Saudi Arabia: King Salman and Crown Prince Mohammed bin Salman expressed their wishes for Shiroka-Pula's success and for the continued progress and prosperity of the people of Kosovo.
- Slovenia: President Nataša Pirc Musar congratulated Shiroka Pula on her election, stating that she looks forward to good and constructive cooperation between Slovenia and Kosovo, both at the bilateral level and within the framework of the Brdo-Brijuni Process.
- Sweden: King Carl XVI Gustaf extended congratulations to Shiroka Pula, wishing her good health and the people of Kosovo continued well-being and prosperity.
- Turkey: President Recep Tayyip Erdoğan congratulated Shiroka Pula, stating "I have full confidence that our multidimensional cooperation will continue to develop in the period ahead. I have no doubt that the contribution of this cooperation to regional stability and peace will continue to grow during Your Excellency’s mandate."
- United Kingdom: The British Embassy issued a clarification denying claims made by candidate Feride Rushiti that she had received its support. The embassy stated: "The United Kingdom has no role in proposing or supporting any specific candidate in Kosovo and has not done so." Following the deadlock, the embassy noted that "Kosovo will hold new national elections" and urged all political parties to act "in accordance with the law and the Constitution" and to conduct the upcoming campaign "constructively and with respect." On 28 October King Charles III, together with Queen Camilla, conveyed his heartfelt congratulations to President Shiroka Pula, highlighting the close and enduring friendship between the United Kingdom and Kosovo, founded on shared values and strengthened over the years through their partnership.
- United States: The U.S. Embassy in Pristina dismissed claims that it had requested or proposed the candidacy of Feride Rushiti. An embassy spokesperson clarified that the United States does not "propose or support specific candidates for president" and emphasized that the selection process is a matter for Kosovo's leaders and its people. The embassy further called on political actors to work together constructively to resolve the political impasse.

== See also ==
- 2025 Kosovo political deadlock, a similar political deadlock relating to the Speaker of the Assembly and the Cabinet
- Politics of Kosovo
