= Caka =

Caka may refer last names in Kosovo and Albania to: Caka, Cakaj, Çaka, or Çakaj

- Čaka, a village in Levice District, Slovakia
- Caka language, a Tivoid language of Cameroon
- Tzachas (d. 1093), Turkish naval commander
- Masar Caka (1946–2000), Kosovar painter
- Nebi Caka, Kosovar engineer
- Caka, 2026 album by Milica Pavlović

== See also ==
- Shaka (disambiguation)
- Gent Cakaj, Kosovar politician
