= Hatixhe Hoxha =

Kosovan philologist, academic and politician

Member of the Assembly of Kosovo
- In office 2001–2007

Personal details
- Born: 22 August 1961 (age 65) Skopje, Yugoslavia
- Party: Democratic Party of Kosovo; Vetëvendosje
- Education: University of Pristina

Hatixhe Hoxha (born 22 August 1961) is a Kosovan philologist, social activist, academic and politician. She served as Member of the Assembly of Kosovo between 2001 and 2007 and was candidate at the 2026 presidential election.

== Early life and education ==
Hoxha was born in Skopje, then Yugoslavia, on 22 August 1961. She holds a PhD in philology and completed a postgraduate course in international relations and diplomacy in Tirana in 2005.

== Career ==
She began her professional career as a teacher and journalist at local television in Pristina and on the radio programme Kosova e lirë. After the war, between 2000 and 2001, Hoxha served as the manager of the Department of Non-Resident Affairs. Hoxha was also a lecturer at the University of Pristina between 2002 and 2003.

Subsequently, between 2001 and 2007, she was a member of the Member of the Assembly of Kosovo with the Democratic Party of Kosovo, where she worked on issues such as social affairs, education and feminism, the latter playing an important role in the promotion of women in political office, and she was co-chair of the group of female lawmakers. She joined Vetëvendosje in 2010. In politics, she continued her career between 2013 and 2017 when she was a member of the Pristina Municipal Assembly.

She is board member of the Kosovo Disability Forum and is the co-founder director of the “Autism" association", which she founded in 2011 after her granddaughter was diagnosed with autism. Hoxha has published articles and participated in presentations, conferences and national and international seminars on linguistics, feminism and the rights of people with disabilities.

On 27 April 2026, following the withdrawal of Glauk Konjufca and Fatmire Kollçaku from the candidacy, the Speaker of the Assembly Albulena Haxhiu, announced that Vetëvendosje proposed two new candidates, Feride Rushiti and Hatixhe Hoxha for the presidential election. An extraordinary session of the Assembly was called for that day, even though the opposition boycotted the session. On the afternoon of 28 April, she announced that she was withdrawing her candidacy and received zero votes in the final parliamentary session held that evening, prior to the dissolution of parliament, after the assembly failed to approve a candidate for President of Kosovo.
