= University of Gjakova =

Public university in Gjakova, Kosovo

Fehmi Agani University
- Universiteti Fehmi Agani
- Established: 1967
- Rector: Prof. Ass. Dr. Drilon Bunjaku
- Location: Gjakova, Kosovo; 42°23′01″N 20°26′12″E
- Website: https://uni-gjk.org/al

The University of Gjakova "Fehmi Agani" (UGJFA; Albanian: Universiteti i Gjakovës "Fehmi Agani", UGJFA) is a public university located in Gjakova, Kosovo. It was originally established as a Higher Pedagogical School in 1967 and has since grown into a comprehensive university.

== See also ==
- Fehmi Agani
- Education in Kosovo
- University of Pristina
