= Hajrizi =

Hajrizi is a surname. Notable people with the surname include:

- Agim Hajrizi (1961–1999), Kosovo Albanian human rights activist
- Drilon Hajrizi (born 1991), Kosovan basketball player
- Kreshnik Hajrizi (born 1999), Swiss-born Albanian Kosovo footballer
