= Naim Jerliu =

Kosovan physician and politician

Naim Jerliu (born 2 November 1969) is a Kosovan public health specialist and politician who was a member of the Assembly of Kosovo from 1998 to 2007.

== Education ==
Jerliu graduated as a Medical Doctor at the Faculty of Medicine, University of Prishtina, Kosovo, where he also earned a Master of Science (MSc) degree in medical sciences. He is a public health specialist and obtained a PhD degree at the Department of International Health, Faculty of Health, Medicine and Life Sciences, Maastricht University, The Netherlands.

== Political career ==
Since early 1990s Naim Jerliu was involved in politics as part of the Democratic League of Kosovo (LDK) - the political movement led by President Ibrahim Rugova, struggling for freedom, democracy, and independence of Kosovo. He was president of the Youth Forum of LDK (1997–2001) and Vice-President of the LDK, for three consecutive terms (1998–2006). Naim Jerliu was elected member of the Kosovo Parliament in three terms (1998–2007). During his tenure as Member of Parliament he was especially focused on health and social welfare issues and policies, drafting and reviewing the legislation and supervising the harmonization of laws enacted by the Kosovo Parliament with the EU legislation. Naim Jerliu served as member of Strategic and Political Group of the Kosovo Unity Team and member of Kosovo delegations at the Vienna talks on the political status of Kosovo (2006–2007) that led to the proclamation of the independence of Kosovo on 17 February 2008. During 2007 - 2010 he served as a Political Advisor to the President of Kosovo.

== Public health ==
Jerliu is founder of the Center on Ageing, at the National Institute of Public Health of Kosovo where he currently works as a public health specialist. He teaches courses on public health at both University of Prishtina and University of Gjakova. His main research focus is in ageing issues and evidence-informed policy making. He has published a number of articles in scientific peer-reviewed international journals.
