= Fatmir Dalladaku =

German cardiac surgeon of Albanian origin

- Born: December 5, 1953 (age 72)
- Education: University of Prishtina; University of Zagreb
- Occupations: Cardiovascular and general surgeon
- Known for: Performing first open heart surgery in Kosovo
- Spouse: Bukurije Oseku-Dalladaku
- Children: 2

Fatmir Dalladaku (born 5 December 1953) is a German cardiac surgeon of Albanian origin. He is best known for performing the first open-heart surgery in Kosovo, and for his pro bono work for patients from Kosovo, Albania and North Macedonia. He spent the biggest part of his professional career in Germany, beginning in 1989.

== Biography ==
=== Early career ===
Fatmir Dalladaku was born on December 5, 1953, in then Yugoslavia (now Republic of Kosovo). After graduating from high school, he enrolled in the Medical Faculty of the University of Prishtina, where he completed his studies in 1979. He continued and finished his postgraduate studies at the Medical Faculty of the University of Zagreb in Croatia, under the tutelage of Prof. Dr. Ivo Despot. Between 1979 and 1982, Dalladaku worked in numerous primary health care centers throughout Kosovo, and at the emergency center in Prishtina. Under the tutelage of Prof. Dr. V.Moracic and Prof. Dr. Gazmend Shaqiri, in 1985 he was a resident at the Surgical Clinic at the Medical Faculty of the University of Prishtina. Between 1985 and 1986, he specialized in general surgery, at the Ozren Novosel and KBC Rebro clinics in Zagreb, under the mentorship of Prof. Dr. Mladen Stulhoffer and Prof. J. Sokolic.

=== Time in Germany ===
In 1989, Dalladaku received a scholarship to do a sub-specialization on cardiovascular surgery at the Deutsches Herzzentrum Berlin under the mentorship of Prof. Dr. Roland Hetzer. His initial plan was to go back to Kosovo after the 18-month period and together with his colleagues from the Department of Vascular Surgery to set up the much-needed cardiac surgery clinic at the Medical Faculty of the University of Prishtina. However, the original plan was never carried out as the abolition of Kosovo's autonomy in 1989 set in motion a chain of events that made its political future uncertain. As the political situation in Kosovo grew increasingly tense, by 1991, the majority of Kosovo Albanian professors and doctors, were fired from the University of Prishtina. With permission from the newly created Kosovo's parallel structures of the Medical Faculty of the University of Prishtina, Dalladaku accepted the offer extended by the Deutsches Herzzentrum Berlin to remain in Berlin as a specialist physician. He performed his first open heart surgery in 1990 while in Berlin and has since performed over 4,000 such surgeries.

In 1994, together with a group of colleagues from Berlin and Heidelberg, Dalladaku co-founded the MediClin Herzzentrum clinic in Lahr-Schwarzwald, Germany, where he is currently senior cardiovascular surgeon.

He returned to Prishtina in 2003 to perform the first open-heart surgery in Kosovo. From 2004 to 2008, he was also engaged as a lecturer at the Medical Faculty of the University of Prishtina. He has written and co-authored numerous papers and has participated in many national and international medical symposiums.

In 2020, he administered the first COVID-19 vaccine injection in Germany.

== First open heart surgery in Kosovo ==
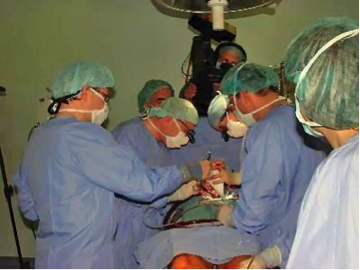
Dalladaku and his team during the first open heart surgery in Kosovo

At Dalladaku's initiative, in May 2003 a team of medical professionals from Germany arrived in Kosovo with the mission to perform the first two bypass open-heart surgeries there. In addition to the free of charge diagnostics of the two patients at the Cardiology Clinic of the Medical Faculty in Tirana, Albania, a few days before surgery, Dalladaku also arranged the transportation of the necessary medical equipment from Germany to Kosovo, including heart lung machines and intra-aortic balloon pumps. After four days of traveling and numerous bureaucratic complications on the way, the technical equipment which was being accompanied by Dalladaku's colleague, Michael Rothe, arrived in Prishtina on May 23. The next day, on May 24, two patients aged 67 and 51 underwent heart surgery which was carried out at the newly renovated operation room of the Clinic of Gynecology and Obstetrics of the University Clinical Center of Kosovo. Surgery was provided free of charge, as all costs were borne by the Herzzentrum Lahr/Schwarzwald clinic, and FD Company, Dalladaku's family business at that time. Although no complications occurred, the German KFOR troops stationed in Kosovo were ready to provide, if needed, transportation from Kosovo to Germany for the two patients.

The medical team of Dr. Andre Gille (anesthesiologist), Ass. Dr. Petra Gehle (assistant), Michael Rothe (cardio technician) and Jens Kubsdella (instrumentalist), as well as Dr. Armin Lehmann, Gabrielle Herrmann, Katja Vogel, Christoph Wehler and Michael Fellhauer of the intensive care unit, flew back to Germany a week after the successful completion of the surgery. While the medical equipment was shipped back to Germany, Dalladaku remained in Kosovo for a few weeks longer to oversee the post-surgery treatment of patients by his Kosovo colleagues. He also was responsible for overseeing the process of donating all unused medications brought from Germany (a total of 18 large aluminum bags) to different clinics of the University Clinical Center of Kosovo.

== Personal life ==
Dalladaku is married to the painter and art professor Bukurije Oseku-Dalladaku, and has two children. He currently lives in Lahr, Germany, and works at the MediClin Herzzentrum Lahr/Baden.
