= Agim Hajrizi =

Albanian activist for human rights

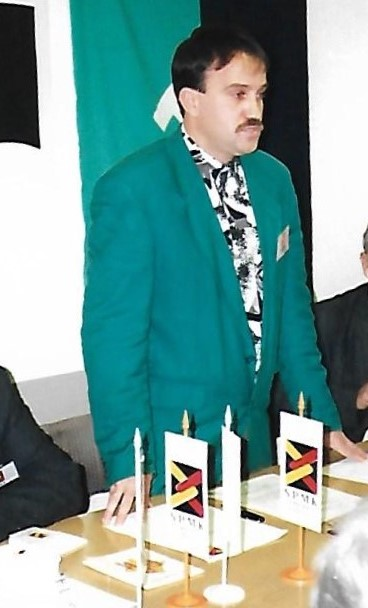
- Agim Hajrizi
- Born: 20 February 1961; Kosovska Mitrovica, PR Serbia, FPR Yugoslavia (modern Kosovo)
- Died: 25 March 1999 (aged 38); Kosovska Mitrovica, FR Yugoslavia (modern Kosovo)
- Citizenship: Yugoslavia
- Title: President of the Union of Independent Trade Unions of Kosova (BSPK)

Agim Hajrizi (20 February 1961 – 25 March 1999) was a Kosovo Albanian human rights activist and the president of the Union of Independent Trade Unions of Kosova (BSPK).

== Biography ==
Agim Hajrizi earned a degree in economics from the University of Pristina. In 1984, he married Aferdita Hajrizi. Together, they had three children: one daughter, Arbnora, and two sons, Ilir and Arianit.

He began to advocate for Albanian rights after the dismissal of Albanian employees from the Trepča Industrial Combine in 1989 where he worked as the head of the IT department.

In 1995, he was elected Chairman of the Independent Kosovo Trade Union Assembly. Due to his activism, he and his family were frequently subjected to harassment and intimidation from Serbian officials.

== Death ==
Agim Hajrizi was assassinated by Serb paramilitary soldiers in his home in Mitrovica on 25 March 1999, during the Kosovo War, with his mother Nazmie and 12-year-old son Ilir. It is thought he was targeted for his political activities, similar to other prominent Kosovo Albanians killed by Serbian forces at the same time.

According to the testimony of his wife, on 25 March 1999, Serbian police and paramilitary forces arrived at Aferdita Hajrizi’s home in Mitrovica and broke through the barricaded front door. Aferdita escaped to the attic with two of her children, but her 11-year-old son, Ilir, ran back downstairs to stay with his father, Agim. From the attic, Aferdita heard gunshots and her mother-in-law pleading with one of the men. When she later went downstairs, she found her husband and son lying dead together, with Ilir suffering from multiple gunshot wounds. Afterwards, Aferdita went into hiding along with her children.

On 16 November 2000, the Mitrovica District Court sentenced Nenad Pavićević to the maximum sentence of 20 years' imprisonment for the murders of Agim, Ilir, and Nazmija Hajrizi. Another person was acquitted of the charge of complicity but received a suspended sentence for the illegal possession of military weapons. The trial took place without Pavićević's presence as he remained a fugitive in Serbia, which was beyond the court's jurisdiction.

The crime was addressed during the International Criminal Tribunal for the former Yugoslavia (ICTY)'s trial against Slobodan Milošević in 2002 and in the case against Milan Milutinović in 2006, with Aferdita Hajrizi as a witness.

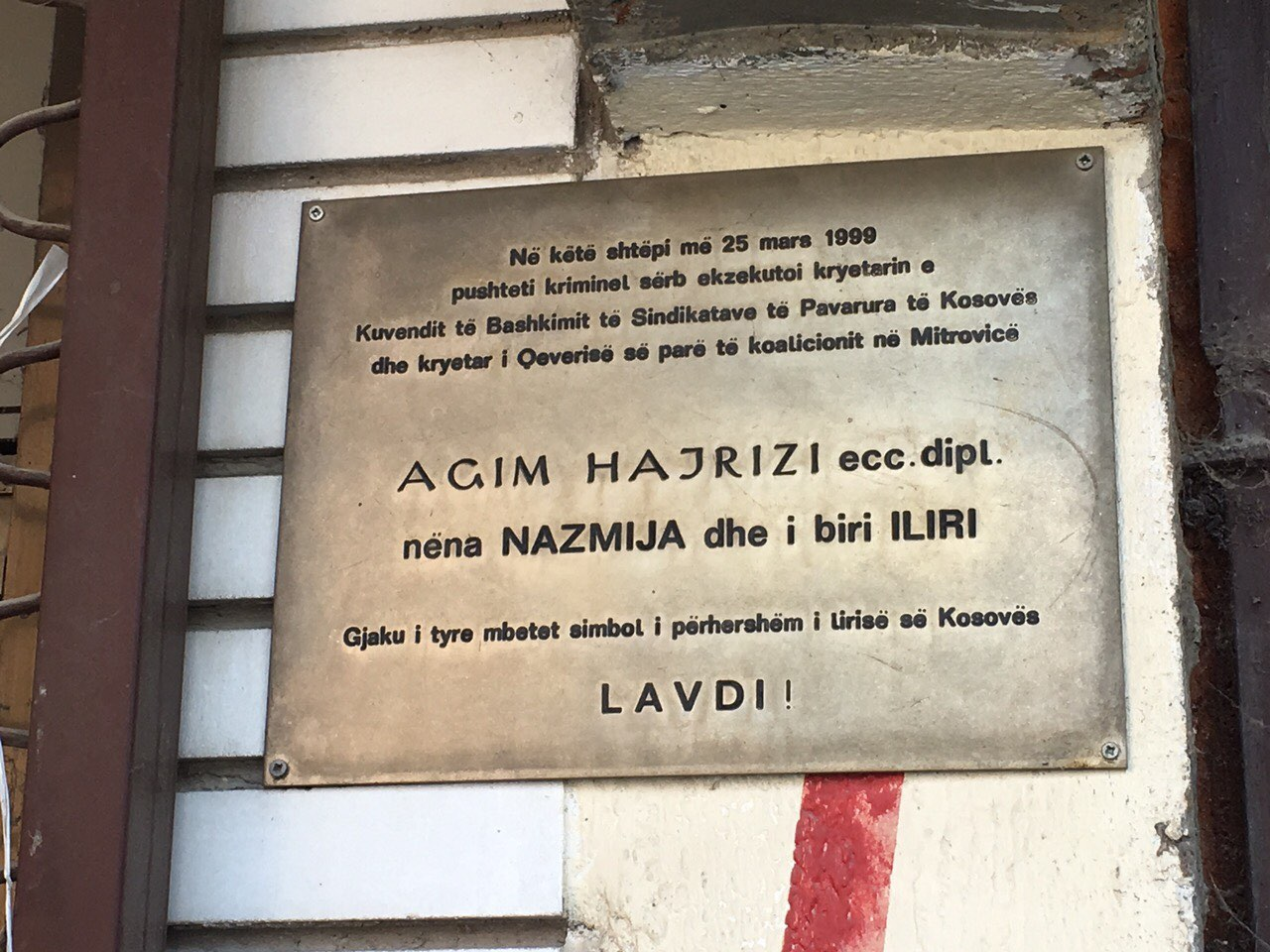
Commemorative plaques at the House of Agim Hajrizi, in Mitrovicë

== See also ==
- List of unsolved murders
- Fehmi Agani
- Ukshin Hoti
