= Bekim Sejdiu =

Kosovar diplomat (born 1974)

Judge of the Constitutional Court of Kosovo
- In office 15 April 2015 – 25 May 2021

Consul General of Kosovo in New York
- In office 1 August 2012 – 1 August 2014
- Preceded by: Arta Rama-Hajrizi
- Succeeded by: Vlora Çitaku

Ambassador of Kosovo to Turkey
- In office 1 September 2008 – 1 July 2012
- Preceded by: Office established
- Succeeded by: Avni Spahiu

Personal details
- Born: October 23, 1974 (age 52) Klina, Yugoslavia (now Kosovo)
- Party: Independent
- Spouse: Alberie Rraci Sejdiu
- Children: 3 (Melisa, Samira, Joni)
- Education: University of Pristina; University of Bologna; University of Sarajevo; Bilkent University; Nova Univerza
- Profession: Academic, diplomat, jurist

Bekim Sejdiu (born 23 October 1974) is a Kosovar academic, diplomat, and jurist who served as a judge in the Constitutional Court of Kosovo and as the Kosovar ambassador to Turkey. He is recognized for his career in constitutional law, international relations, and diplomacy. In August 2026, he was nominated by both Vetëvendosje and the Democratic League of Kosovo (LDK) as a consensual candidate for the presidency of the Republic of Kosovo. However, his nomination was blocked by six LDK members of Parliament.

== Early life and education ==
Bekim Sejdiu was born on 23 October 1974 in Klina, Yugoslavia (now Kosovo). He began his higher education at the University of Pristina, earning his law degree in 1999. In 2001, he obtained a master's degree in Democracy and Human Rights through a joint program by the University of Bologna and the University of Sarajevo. Sejdiu then continued his postgraduate studies at Bilkent University in Ankara, Turkey, where he completed a master's degree in International Relations in 2005. Later in his career, he earned a doctoral degree in International and Diplomatic Studies from Nova Univerza in Slovenia in 2019.

== Career ==
Sejdiu became a professor in the Faculty of Law at the University of Pristina in 2002, where he currently teaches public international law and European Union law. He served as the Program Director for the Kosovar Civil Society Foundation from 2000 to 2002, and as a founding member of the Kosovar Institute for Policy Research and Development (KIPRED) from 2002 to 2003.

In 2008, Sejdiu transitioned into diplomacy, initially serving as an advisor to the Ministry of Foreign Affairs. He subsequently joined the Kosovo Diplomatic Service, serving as Ambassador to Turkey from September 2008 to July 2012. Following this, he served as the Consul General in New York from August 2012 to August 2014.

On 15 April 2015 he was appointed as a judge of the Constitutional Court of Kosovo. He resigned on 25 May 2021.

=== 2026 Presidential Nomination ===
In August 2026, Sejdiu was proposed as a candidate for President of Kosovo by the Vetëvendosje (LVV) and Democratic League of Kosovo (LDK) parties. However, the nomination immediately encountered significant internal opposition within the LDK. On 1 September, six LDK MPs declared they would not support Sejdiu or attend the parliamentary vote, effectively blocking the required constitutional quorum. Following the collapse of the consensus option, LDK leader Lumir Abdixhiku announced on 2 September that the rejection of Sejdiu's candidacy had sealed the political process, leading the country toward new snap elections. Abdixhiku further clarified that the party had already decided to remain in the opposition and emphasized that no broader governing agreement existed with Vetëvendosje.

== Personal life ==
Bekim Sejdiu is married to Alberie Rraci Sejdiu, and the couple has three children: Melisa, Samira, and Joni.

== Publications ==
- Engaging with the self-captive nation: Albania in the US official documents from 1945 to 1980 (2017) in the Journal of Southeast European and Black Sea Studies.
- Unveiling the unknown face: the role of the United Nations in promoting democracy.
