= Nebi Caka =

Kosovar electrical engineer, linguist and academic

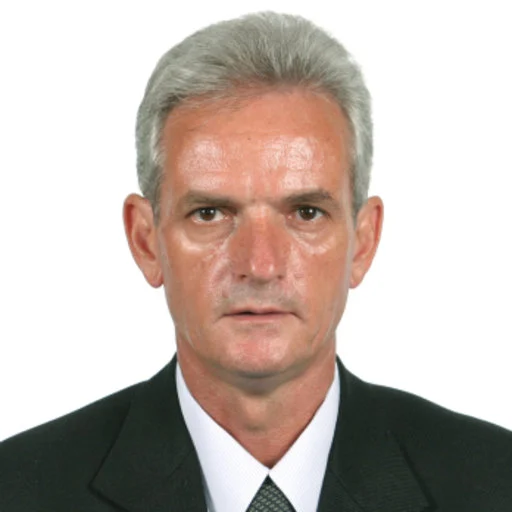
- Born: 1 March 1946 (age 80); Pristina, Kosovo
- Known for: Electrical engineering education, microelectronics, optoelectronics, optical communications, laser processing, corpus linguistics and lexicography

Academic background
- Education: University of Sarajevo, University of Zagreb, University of Pristina

Academic work
- Institutions: University of Pristina, Kosova Academy of Sciences and Arts

Nebi Caka (born 1 March 1946) is a Kosovar electrical engineer, linguist and academic, known for his long academic career at the University of Pristina and contributions to electrical engineering, microelectronics, optoelectronics, optical communications, laser processing, corpus linguistics and lexicography. He has also been involved in scientific committees and Albanian language standardization initiatives in Kosovo.

== Early life and education ==
Nebi Caka was born on 1 March 1946 in Pristina, Kosovo. He completed primary and secondary education in his hometown and later pursued engineering and philological studies.

Caka graduated as an electrical engineer (Dipl. Ing.) in Electronics and Telecommunications from the Technical Faculty in Banja Luka, University of Sarajevo. He also studied Albanian Language and Literature at the Faculty of Philology, University of Pristina. He continued postgraduate studies in both technical sciences and language studies, becoming a Magister of Technical Sciences in Radio Communications and Professional Electronics from the University of Zagreb and a Magister of Philological Sciences from the University of Pristina. In 2001, he defended his dissertation titled "Imaging and simulation of the dynamics and measurements of biomedical phenomena using optical data processing" and earned the title of Doctor of Technical Sciences (Dr.Sc.) in Electrical Engineering at the University of Pristina.

== Academic career ==
Caka's academic career has been primarily at the Faculty of Electrical and Computer Engineering, University of Pristina, where he has taught courses such as microelectronics, optoelectronics, optical communications, computer-aided design, VLSI systems, laser processing, and communication skills.

He started teaching at the Technical School Centre "19 Nëntori” in Pristina in 1969, becoming its deputy manager/director in 1971. In 1976, Caka engaged as a teaching assistant at the University of Pristina and became a lecturer in 1995. In 1996, he became the chief of the Department of Electronics and in 2011 earned the title of full professor.

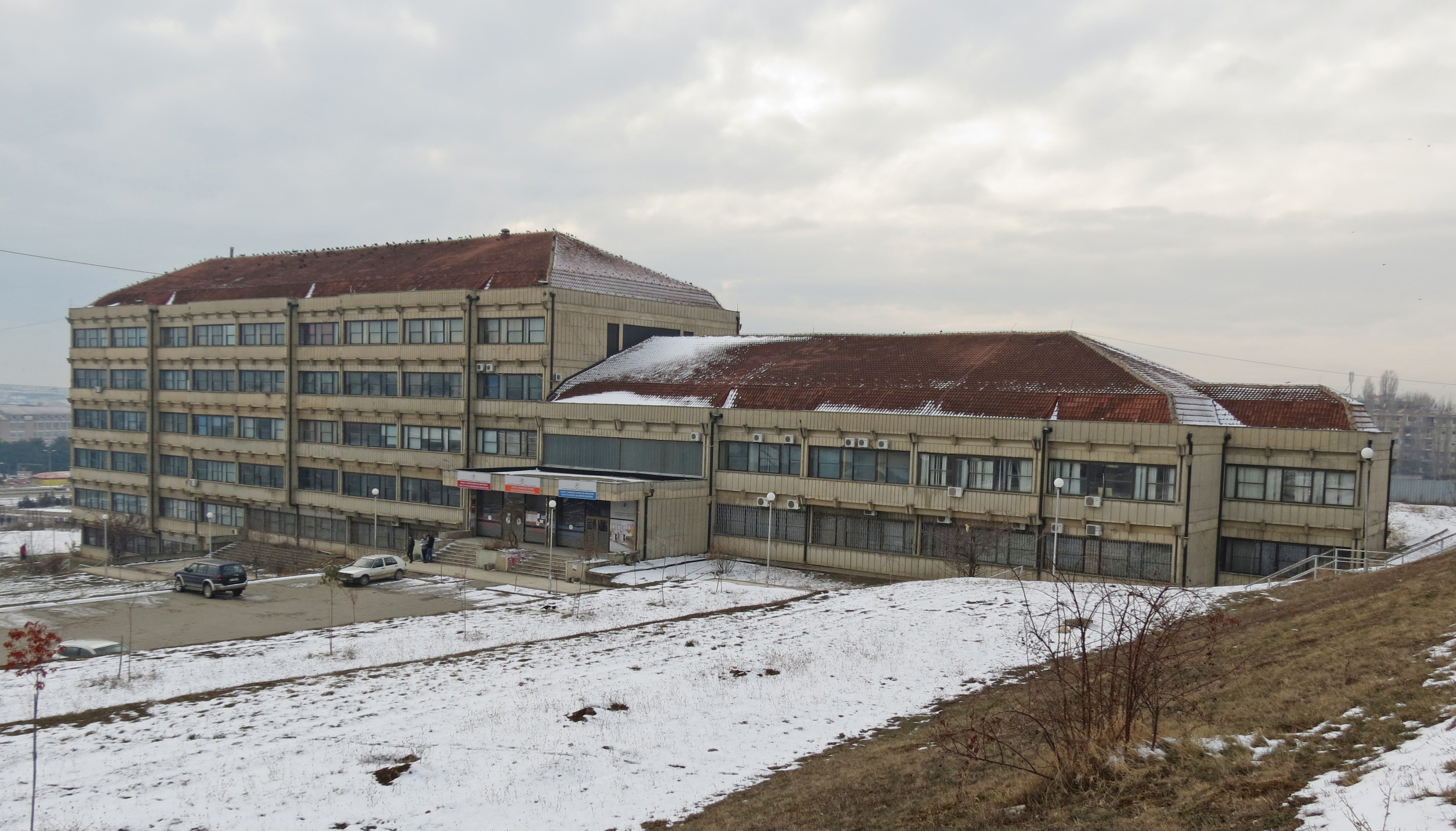
Faculty of Electrical and Computer Engineering, University of Pristina

Caka also served as vice-dean of the Faculty of Electrical and Computer Engineering during 1997–2001, and as a member of the University of Pristina's Senate and of the Central Council of Doctoral Studies during 2009–2012. Beyond his home institution, he was a visiting professor at the Faculty of Computer Sciences at the University of Tetovo and other faculties of the University of Pristina, including the Faculty of Education, Faculty of Civil Engineering and Architecture, and Faculty of Applied Technical Sciences in Mitrovica.

Caka has supervised numerous doctoral, magisterial, and master's students in electrical engineering and related fields, contributing to research on MOSFET technologies, optical network design, and engineering education.

== Professional career ==
In parallel with his academic career, Caka held a number of senior technical and managerial positions in Kosovo's broadcasting, electronics, and industrial sectors, contributing to the development of media infrastructure, technical education, and industrial operations.

RTP engineers in a study visit in London, 1973

He started his career as an engineer at Corporation "Kombinati XEK Kosova" (now Kosovo Energy Corporation) in Obiliq in 1971. From 1973 to 1990, he was chief engineer of the Television Equipment Maintenance and Repair Department at Radio Television of Pristina (RTP) (now Radio Television of Kosovo), where he played a central role in the operation, maintenance, and technical modernization of television broadcasting infrastructure in Kosovo.

Between 1990 and 1992, Caka worked as a service engineer of audio and video equipment at ARC Electronics in Pristina, providing technical maintenance and repair services for professional electronic systems.

From 2003 to 2008, he served as executive director of AlbanicaSat at Global Media Distribution Services (GMDS) in Pristina, where he was responsible for satellite media distribution operations and technical coordination.

In addition, he engaged as expert for reviewing telecommunication and electrical installation aspects of various projects, ranging from the Postal Transit Center in Fushë Kosova to that for the rehabilitation of "Rilindja" building in Pristina.

== Involvement in language and scientific networks ==
Kosova Academy of Sciences and Arts

In addition to his technical work, Caka has been active in linguistic and scientific communities, including committees dedicated to language standardization and lexicography in Kosovo. He has participated in professional networks of Albanian scholars, such as Alb-Science Institute (Instituti Alb-Shkenca), and contributed to academic forums focused on intercultural terminologies and technical vocabularies.

In 2015, he continued his engagement with the Kosova Academy of Sciences and Arts as part of its Lexicographic Encyclopedic Centre, reflecting his interdisciplinary involvement beyond engineering domains. Within the Kosova Academy of Sciences and Arts, Caka authored "Leksiku i Përveçëm i Revistës "Përparimi" 1955-1968" and co-authored "Dictionary of Informatics: English-Albanian, Albanian-English".

== Research and publications ==
Caka's research interests include microelectronics, optoelectronics, photonics, and optical fiber communications, and he has published in internationally recognized journals and conference proceedings. His works range from university books on microelectronics and optoelectronics, academic language studies and lexicography, and research on lasers, MOSFET transistor parameters and harmonic performance in power inverters to others related with engineering education.

Selected books include:

- Caka, Nebi (2022). Mikroelektronika – Parimet dhe zbatimet.
- Caka, Nebi. Leksiku i përvëçëm i revistës “Përparimi” 1955–1968. Kosova Academy of Sciences and Arts.
- Caka, Nebi; Dika, Agni; Rodiqi, Seb. Fjalor i Informatikës (Dictionary of Informatics). Kosova Academy of Sciences and Arts.
- Caka, Nebi (2006). Mikroelektronika. University of Pristina.
- Kokaj, Jahja; Caka, Nebi (2001). Laserët – Parimet dhe zbatimet. University of Pristina.
- Caka, Nebi (1996). Optoelektronika.

Selected publications include:

- Kabashi, Qamil; Shabani, Isak; Caka, Nebi (2022). "Analysis of the student dropout rate at the Faculty of Electrical and Computer Engineering of the University of Pristina, Kosovo". IEEE Access. 10: 68126–68137. doi:10.1109/ACCESS.2022.9804699.
- Caka, Nebi; Caka, Ali (2021). "EMRAT E SHQIPTARËVE TË KOSOVËS - Prejardhja dhe motivimi nëpër breza KOSOVAR'S ALBANIANS NAMES - Origin and motivation across generations". Studime shoqërore - ASHAK.
- Zabeli, Milaim; Caka, Nebi; Limani, Myzafere; Kabashi, Qamil (2018). "MOSFET parameters' impact in CMOS inverter switching characteristics". International Journal of Circuits, Systems and Signal Processing.
- Zabeli, Milaim; Caka, Nebi (2018). "Design simulations of synchronous counters with different modulus" (PDF). International Review on Modeling and Simulations.
- Caka, Ali; Caka, Nebi (2016). "Mbiemrat e shqiptarëve të Kosovës–prejardhja dhe shpërndarja rajonale (Origin and regional distribution of Kosovo Albanian surnames)" (PDF). Studime shoqërore - ASHAK.
- Agai, Florin; Caka, Nebi; Komoni, Vjollca (2011). "Design optimization and simulation of the photovoltaic systems on buildings in Southeast Europe". International Journal of Advances in Engineering & Technology.
- Caka, Nebi; Hulaj, Astrit (2011). "The analysis of different FTTH architectures and possibilities of their implementation in Kosovo" (PDF). 11th WSEAS International Conference on Applied Informatics and Communications.
- Caka, Nebi; Hulaj, Astrit (2011). "Optimization of FTTH network in Kosovo through the implementation of GPON architecture and analysis of the cost of the implementation" (PDF). International Journal of Communications.
- Caka, Nebi; Caka, Ali (2011). "Korpusi i gjuhës shqipe–rezultatet e para, problemet dhe detyrat". Shqipja dhe gjuhët e Ballkanit–Albanian and Balkan Languages.
- Hyseni, Genc; Caka, Nebi; Hyseni, Kujtim (2010). "Infrared thermal detectors parameters: semiconductor bolometers versus pyroelectrics". WSEAS TRANSACTIONS on CIRCUITS and SYSTEMS.
- Hyseni, Genc; Caka, Nebi; Hyseni, Kujtim (2010). "Analysis of MWIR infrared pyroelectric detectors parameters". Proceedings of the 5th WSEAS International Conference on Optics, Astrophysics, Astronomy.
- Caka, Nebi; Caka, Ali (2010). "Motivimi i emërtimit të fëmijëve në Kosovë 1912–2008' (The naming of children in Kosova 1912-2008)". AKTET/Journal of Institute Alb-Shkenca.
- Caka, Ali; Caka, Nebi (2010). "Mbiemrat e sotëm të shqiptarëve të Kosovës (Kosovar Albanian Surnames)". AKTET/Journal of Institute Alb-Shkenca.
- Zabeli, Milaim; Caka, Nebi; Limani, Myzafere; Kabashi, Qamil (2007). "The impact of MOSFET's physical parameters on its threshold voltage". Proceedings of the 6th WSEAS International Conference on Microelectronics, Nanoelectronics, Optoelectronics.

== Recognition and impact ==
Academic ranking and scientometric data place Caka among established contributors in electrical and electronic engineering research associated with the University of Pristina. He is active in ResearchGate, where he has more than 100 publications with more than 1 million readings.

== Personal life ==
Caka is married and has two daughters.
