= Fehmi Agani =

Kosovar sociologist and politician

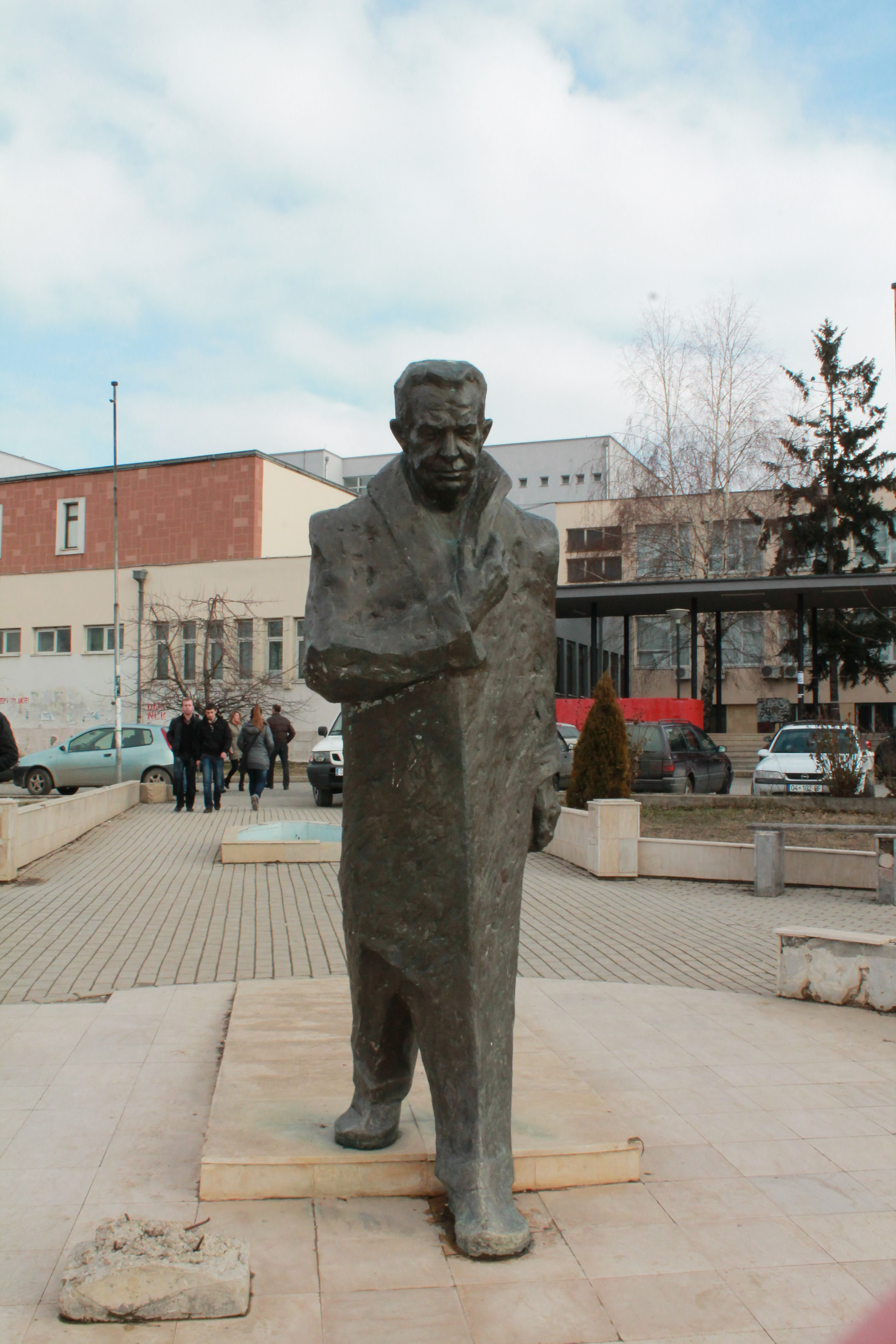
- Statue of Fehmi Agani at the University of Pristina campus.
- Born: 23 January 1932; Đakovica, Kingdom of Yugoslavia (present-day Kosovo)
- Died: 6 May 1999 (aged 67); Lipljan, FR Yugoslavia (present-day Kosovo)
- Occupations: Educator, sociologist, politician
- Years active: 1967–1999

Fehmi Agani (23 January 1932 – 6 May 1999) was a sociologist and politician in Kosovo who was considered to be the leading thinker and political strategist of the Democratic League of Kosovo (LDK) in the 1990s. He represented the LDK in international negotiations prior to the 1998–1999 Kosovo War, but was murdered, apparently by Serbian soldiers, during the war because of his political attitudes.

== Early life and educational career ==
Agani was born in Gjakova in the then Kingdom of Yugoslavia and was educated at a Pristina school. He studied at the University of Belgrade's Faculty of Arts, graduating in 1959 and completing a master's degree in political science in 1964. He subsequently taught sociology in Pristina, obtained a doctorate and took up a teaching position at the University of Pristina. He served as director of the Albanological Institute between 1967 and 1970, and as dean of the Faculty of Philosophy between 1978 and 1980. The authorities excluded him from teaching in 1981 and expelled him from the university during a purge of Kosovo Albanian academics following student riots.

== Political career ==
Agani was elected as a corresponding member of the Academy of Sciences and Arts of Kosovo in 1994 and became a full member two years later. He participated in the political dialogue over Kosovo's future, serving under Ibrahim Rugova as a co-founder and deputy head of the Democratic League of Kosovo (LDK). He became the LDK's leading thinker and political strategist. He headed Albanian delegations at talks leading up to the 1998–1999 Kosovo War and was one of the principal Kosovar negotiators at the Rambouillet Conference. A leading advocate of non-violence and reconciliation, he founded the Forum for Ethnic Relations with the aim of fostering a dialogue between Albanians and Serbs. The Kosovo Albanian philosopher Shkëlzen Maliqi later described Agani's role as being

more of an independent actor and, in comparison to Rugova – who kept repeating the same dry phrases and promises – conducted active daily politics and directed the LDK's and the Albanian movement's ideological and strategic policy ... Agani was leading a pragmatic policy and managed the active part of the legalistic policy, balancing the tensions between the governing structures of the movement and the centres of power, that is, the parliament and government of Kosovo.

== Kosovo War and death ==
He remained in Kosovo during the war and escaped an initial purge of prominent Kosovo Albanians from Pristina carried out by Serbian forces. NATO mistakenly announced his death a few days after the NATO bombing of Yugoslavia began, but he stayed in hiding in safe houses in the city for five weeks, using the time to start writing a book. He attempted to escape to Macedonia by train, but it was turned back at the border. As the train set off back to Pristina, Agani was removed from his carriage by the police. His body was found near the village of Lipjan several days later. Although the Serbian media blamed his death on the Kosovo Liberation Army (KLA), the killing was attributed by his family, the KLA, and Western politicians to Yugoslavia's security forces. The Federal Foreign Office of Germany released a statement, where they said that the case of Agani would be solved by the ICTY, but to date nobody has been charged with Agani's murder.

A 2001 report by Human Rights Watch stated the "circumstances behind Agani's death remain unclear".

== Bibliography ==
- Në rrjedha të mendimit sociologjik – Vepra I 1990. ISBN 9951-05-000-X and ISBN 9951-05-001-8
- Për shoqërinë civile – Vepra II ISBN 9951-05-000-X and ISBN 9951-05-002-6
- Demokracia, Kombi, Vetëvendosja – Vepra III ISBN 9951-05-000-X and ISBN 9951-05-003-4
- Partitë dhe grupet politike në Shqipëri gajtë luftës së dytë botërore (1939–1945) – Vepra IV ISBN 9951-05-000-X and ISBN 9951-05-004-2
- Sindikatat Gjermane dhe shkrime tjera – Vepra V ISBN 9951-05-000-X and ISBN 9951-05-005-0
- Gjuha e dhunës dhe zëri i arsyes – Vepra VI ISBN 9951-05-000-X and ISBN 9951-05-006-9
- Pavarësia gjasa dhe shpresë – Vepra VII ISBN 9951-05-000-X and ISBN 9951-05-007-7.
- Intervista, reagime – Vepra VIII ISBN 9951-05-000X and ISBN 9951-05-008-5.

== See also ==
- Agim Hajrizi
- Lists of solved missing person cases
- List of unsolved murders (1980–1999)
- Ukshin Hoti
