= Ukshin Hoti =

Albanian philosopher and activist (1943–1999)

- Born: 17 June 1943; Krushë e Madhe, Rahovec, Kingdom of Albania
- Disappeared: 16 May 1999 (aged 55); Dubrava Prison, Istog, FR Yugoslavia
- Status: Missing for 27 years, 5 months and 17 days

Ukshin Hoti was a Kosovo Albanian philosopher and activist. Hoti was a professor of international law and later philosophy at the University of Pristina and founder of UNIKOMB, a political party of Kosovo. Since 1982 he had been arrested several times by Yugoslav authorities. In 1994 he was convicted to five years in the Dubrava prison. In May 1999, when his sentence ended and he was to be released, the prison guards transferred him to an unknown location. His whereabouts remain unknown and many human rights activists consider him dead.

== Life ==
Ukshin Hoti was born in the village of Krushë e Madhe in the Rahovec Municipality at the time part of Italian-occupied Albania. He studied political science at the University of Zagreb and the University of Belgrade and had postgraduate studies at the University of Chicago, Harvard University, and the University of Washington in international relations and political science. From 1975, Hoti taught international law at the University of Pristina and held an administrative position at the parliament of Kosovo.

In 1982 he was sentenced by a Yugoslav court and spent three and a half years in prison for his support to the 1981 protests in Kosovo, although he was not charged with the use or advocacy of violence. In 1983 Amnesty International declared him a prisoner of conscience. On 28 September 1994, he was sentenced to five years in the Dubrava penitentiary for "endangering the constitutional order of Serbia". On 16 May 1999, the day he was to be released, he was last seen alive by three inmates. Rather than be released, he was transferred to the prison of Niš, and from then, he went missing.

== Works ==
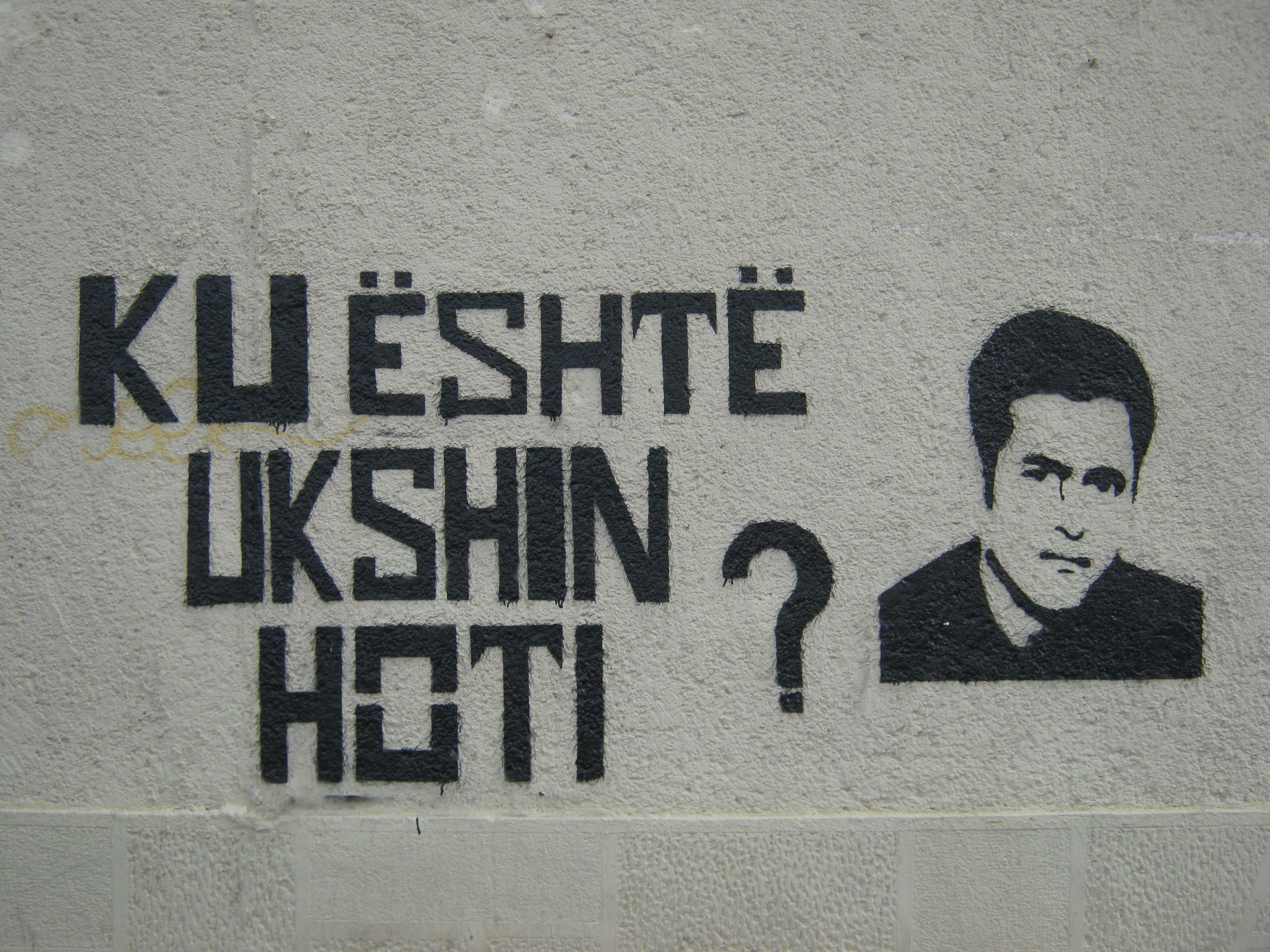
Ku është Ukshin Hoti? (Where is Ukshin Hoti?). Graffiti in Pristina.

- The Cold War and The Détente (Lufta e ftohtë dhe Detanti)
- The Political Philosophy of the Albanian Cause (Filozofia Politike e Çështjes Shqiptare)
- Talk through the prison bars (Bisedë përmes hekurash)

His works include the treatise, the Philosophical Politics of the Albanian Cause (Albanian: Filozofia politike e ceshtjes shqiptare), published in English in 1998. He was also nominated for the Sakharov Prize in 1998. His brother Afrim, a member of Vetëvendosje was elected a deputy of Kosovo in the Kosovan parliamentary election, 2010.

== See also ==
- Agim Hajrizi
- Bardhyl Çaushi
- Fehmi Agani
- List of people who disappeared mysteriously (2000–present)
