= Feride Rushiti =

Kosovan activist and doctor (born 1970)

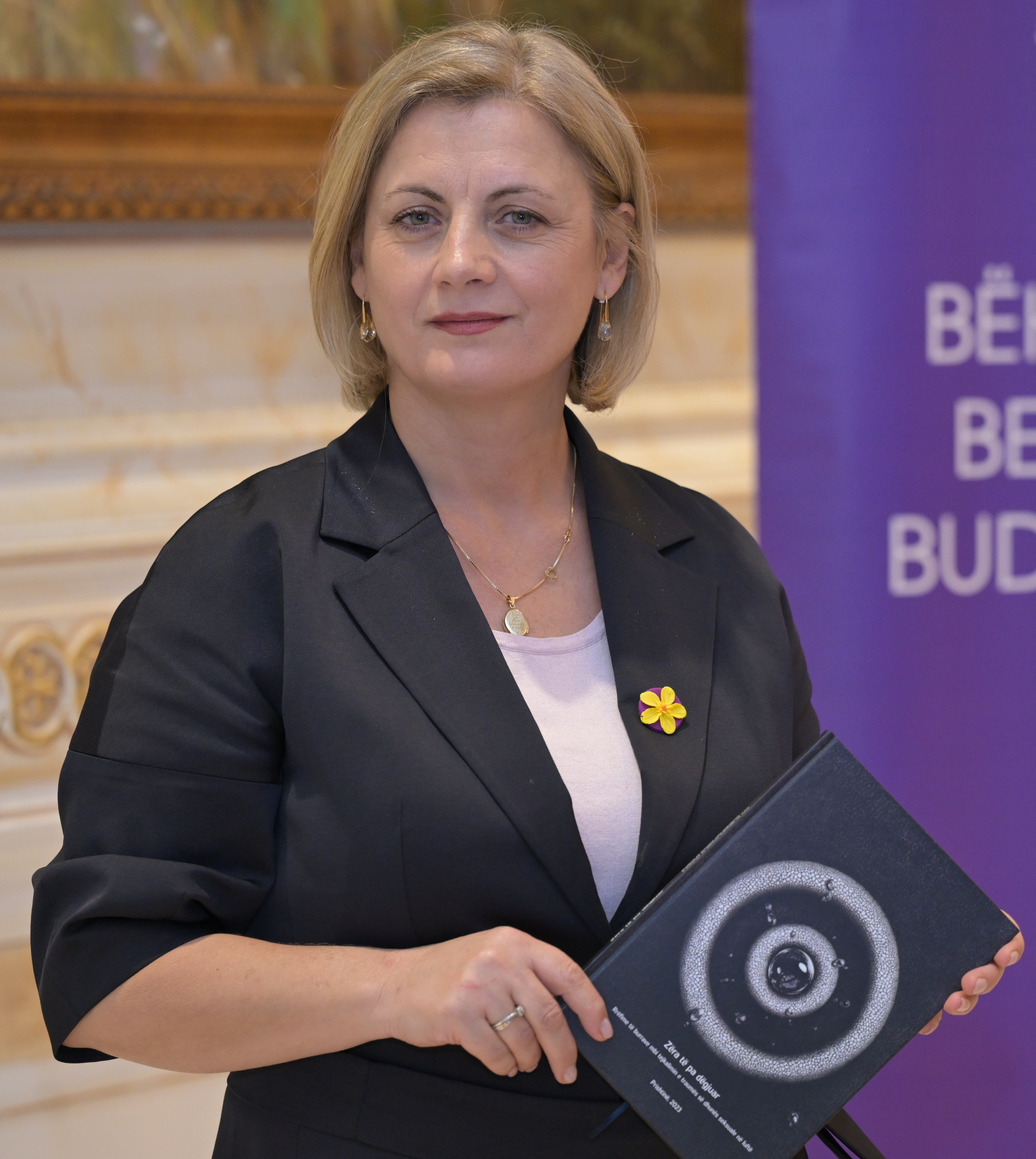
- Rushiti in 2023
- Born: September 12, 1970 (age 56); Dragance, SAP Kosovo, SFR Yugoslavia
- Occupations: Doctor, Human Rights Activist
- Known for: Kosova Rehabilitation Centre for Torture Victims

Feride Rushiti (born September 12, 1970) is a Kosovan activist, doctor, and director of the "Kosovo Center for the Rehabilitation of Torture Survivors" (KRCT). Rushiti received the U.S. Secretary of State's International Women of Courage Award from US First Lady Melania Trump on 23 March 2018.

== Education and Career ==
Feride Rushiti was born on September 12, 1970. She completed her studies at the Faculty of Medicine in Tirana, Albania in 1997 where she specialized in gastroenterology.

In the aftermath of the 1998-1999 Kosovo war Rushiti mobilized a team of 45 health professionals from Kosovo, for post-war returnees and survivors of torture. She served as a doctor in refugee camps in Albania, where she had direct contact with survivors of sexual violence.

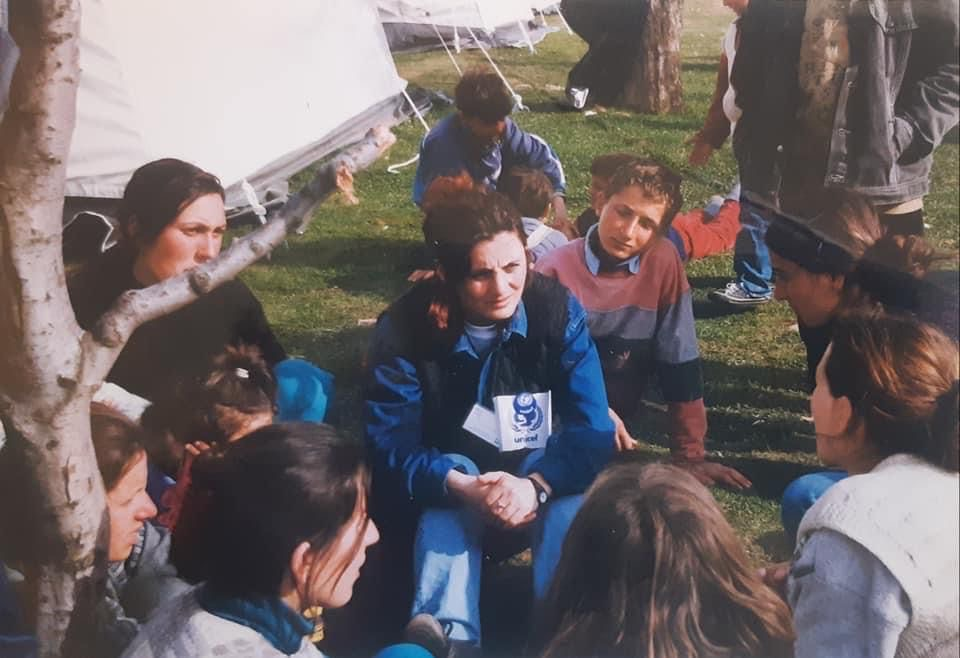
Dr. Feride Rushiti - In the refugee camp in Kukes during 1999

After the war, she founded the KRCT, with a focus on rehabilitating survivors of torture and sexual violence, as well as advocating for their rights.

After more than a decade of lobbying by women activists, including Feride Rushiti, survivors are entitled to compensation as victims of war. She interceded with Bedri Hamza, the minister for finance, when rumours began that the compensation would be low. They started enrolling in February 2018. War rape survivors can receive $280 (about 228 Euro) in monthly compensation.

== Contribution to Policies and Reforms ==
Through her work, Rushiti has been involved in various legal and social initiatives in Kosovo, including:

- Integrating psychosocial services for war survivors (1999)
- Monitoring correctional institutions in Kosovo for over 18 years, ensuring compliance with international human rights standards
- Contribution to the legal recognition of survivors of sexual violence as civilian victims of war (2014)
- Creating documentary archives for crimes of sexual violence during war (2019)
- Initiative for the official recognition of April 14 as the National Day of Remembrance for Survivors of Sexual Violence in War (2023)
- Advocating for the adoption of the Law on Mandatory Health Insurance for Survivors of Sexual Violence during War (2024)

== Global Advocacy and International Engagement ==
Rushiti is a member of the SEMA Network and the International Rehabilitation Council for Torture Victims (IRCT), where she collaborates with international human rights organizations. She has shared Kosovo's experience in the reparations process with countries such as Iraq, Ukraine, Colombia and Guinea.

In collaboration with international institutions such as the DIGNITY Institute of Denmark and Monash University, she has been part of studies on the intergenerational effects of trauma and new approaches to family therapy.

== Awards and Recognitions ==
Rushiti has been honored with several international awards, including:

- International Women of Courage Award from the US Department of State (2018)
- "Woman of Excellence" Award (2019)
- Excellent Leadership Award from UBT (2020)
- Nomination for the Nobel Peace Prize (2025)
- Nominated for the President of Republic of Kosovo in 2026. Proposed by majority parties in the parliament and awarded by Melania Trump (first lady of USA), wife of Donald Trump .

== Publications ==
She has authored and co-authored several studies on human rights and the rehabilitation of survivors of sexual violence, including:

- Human Rights in Kosovo Correctional Institutions (2024)
- Family Therapy for Kosovar Mothers Who Experienced Conflict-Related Sexual Violenceand Their Children (2024)
- How Male Survivors of Wartime Sexual Violence Navigate Silence and Voice (2023)
- Intergenerational Effects of Maternal Post-Traumatic Stress Disorder (2021)
- Quality of prison life, violence, and mental health in Dubrava prison
