= Masar Caka =

Albanian painter

Masar Caka (1946 – 2000) was an Albanian painter. He was a professor at the University of Pristina and the Academy of Figurative Arts of Kosovo, located in Pristina.

Masar Caka was born on 13 April 1946 in Gjakova, Yugoslavia. He graduated from the Academy of Figurative Arts of Belgrade in 1972. In 1982 he received a master's degree from the same institution. Since 1976 he was a member of the Academy of Figurative Arts of Kosovo.

Masar Caka was a professor at the faculty of arts of the University of Pristina. Later he taught at the Academy of Figurative Arts of Kosovo. He died in 2000. His works, which many times consisted of visionary human forms influenced many artists of the younger generation.
