= University of Pristina =

Public university in Kosovo

- Universiteti i Prishtinës
- Seal of University of Pristina
- Latin: Universitas Studiorum Prishtiniensis
- Type: Public
- Established: 18 November 1969; 56 years ago (officially); 2 August 1999; 27 years ago (current form)
- Affiliations: Erasmus
- Budget: €34.0 million
- Rector: Arben Hajrullahu
- Academic staff: 1,284
- Students: 23,351 (2024–25)
- Location: Pristina, Kosovo; 42.658687°N 21.161649°E
- Campus: Urban
- Colours
- Website: uni-pr.edu

University rankings

Regional – Overall
- QS Emerging Europe and Central Asia: 351-400 (2022)

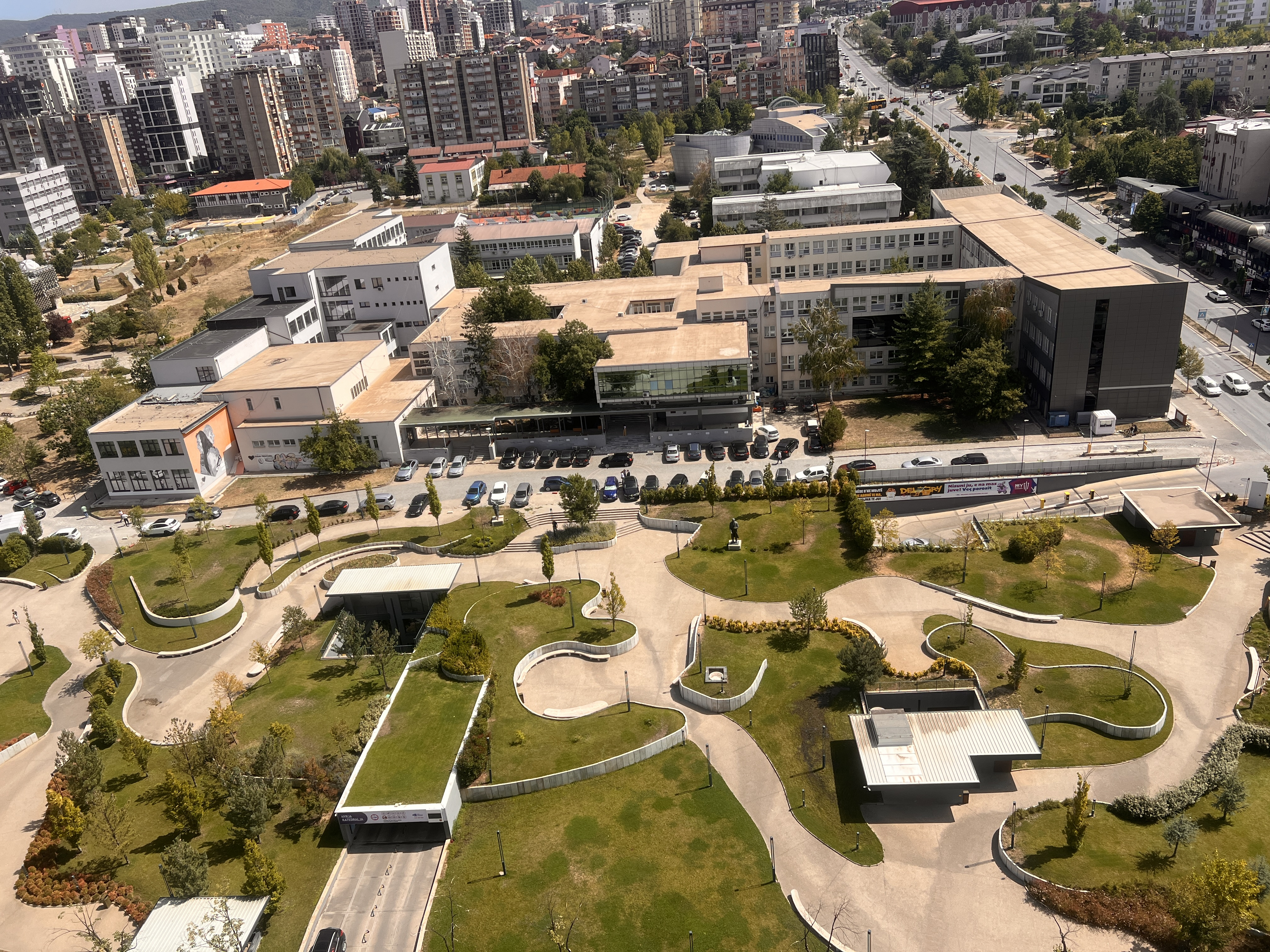
View of the main buildings of the University in the centre of Pristina.

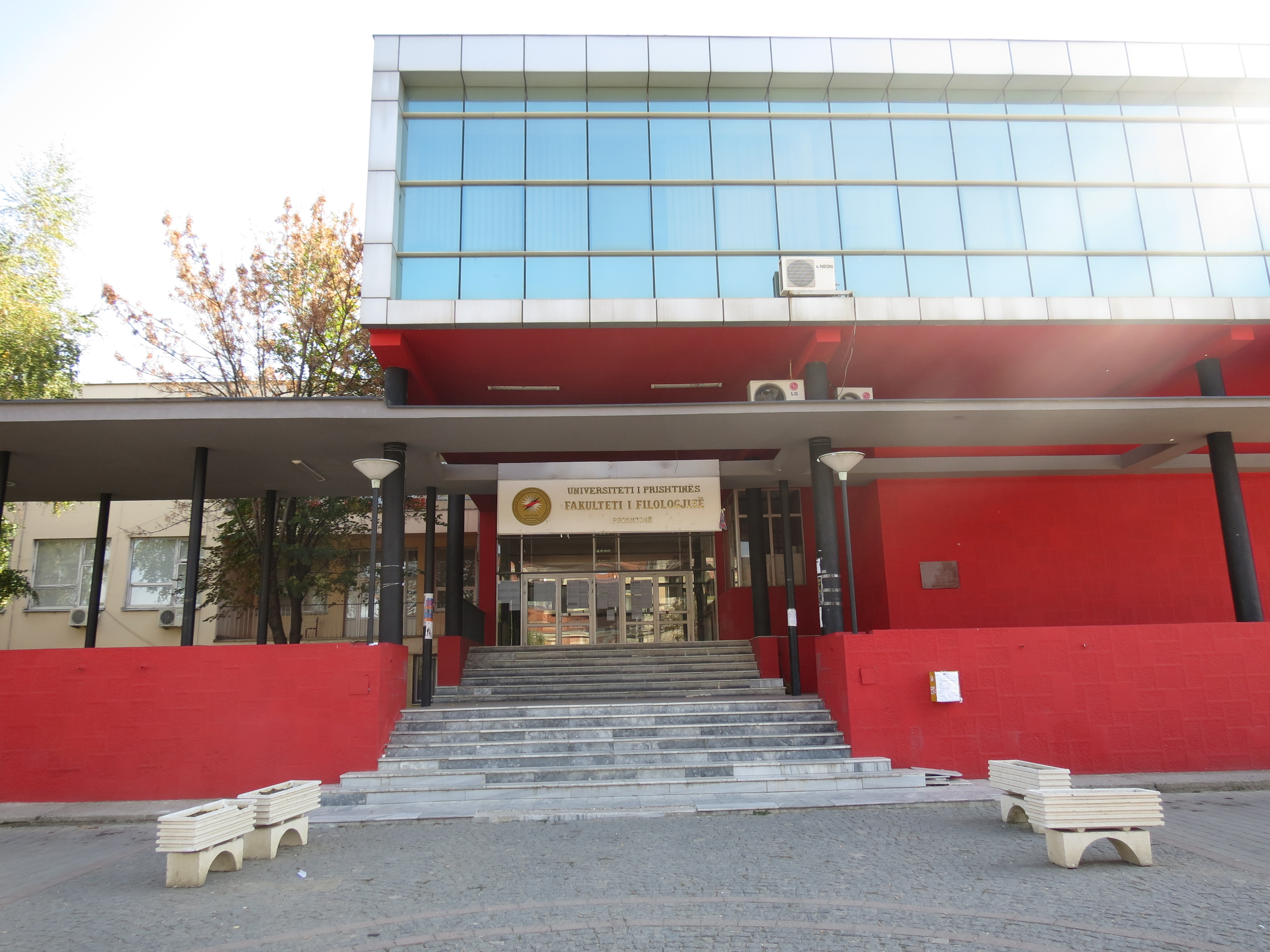
Faculty of Philology

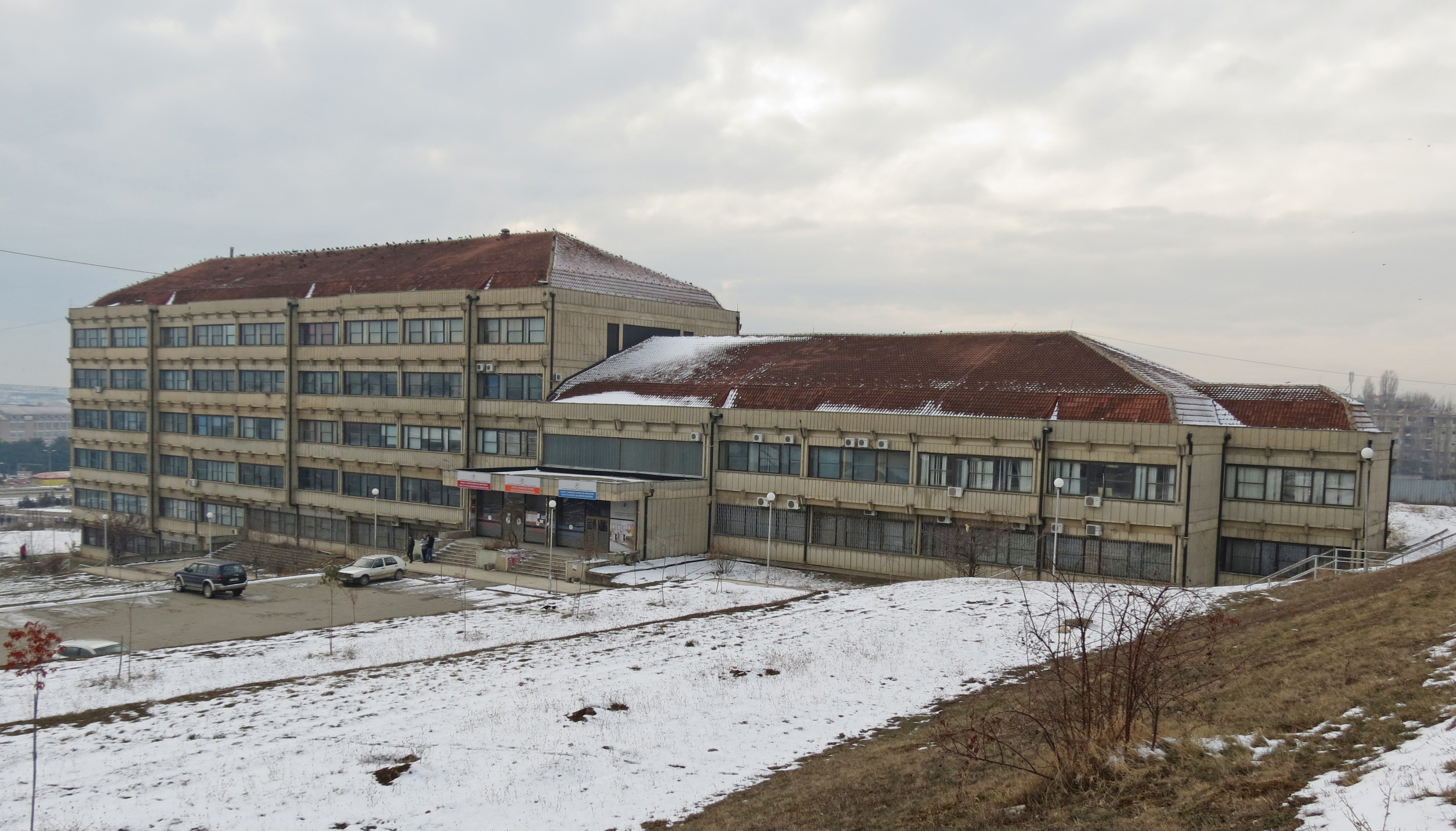
Faculty of Engineering

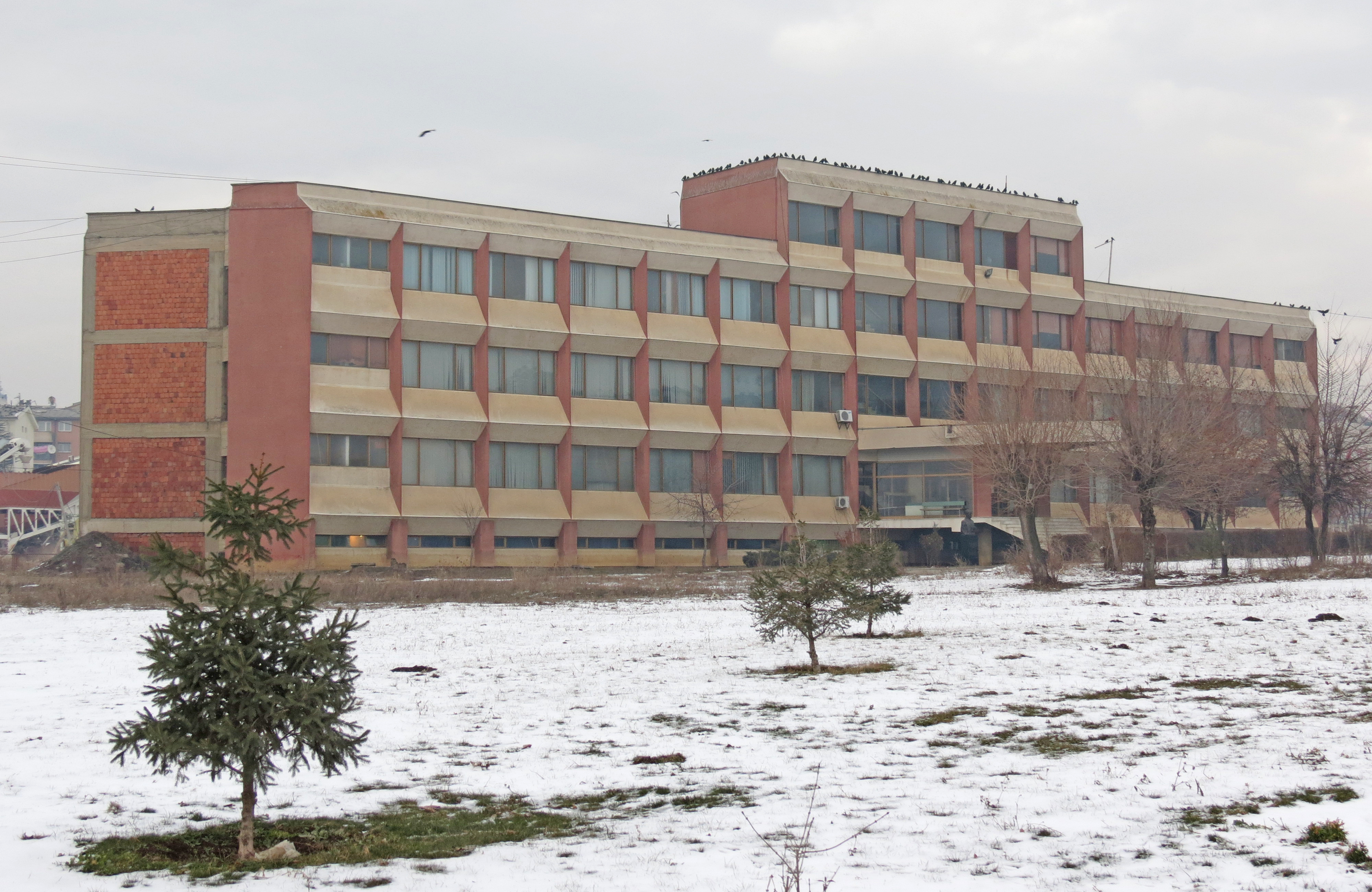
Faculty of Medicine (Institute A)

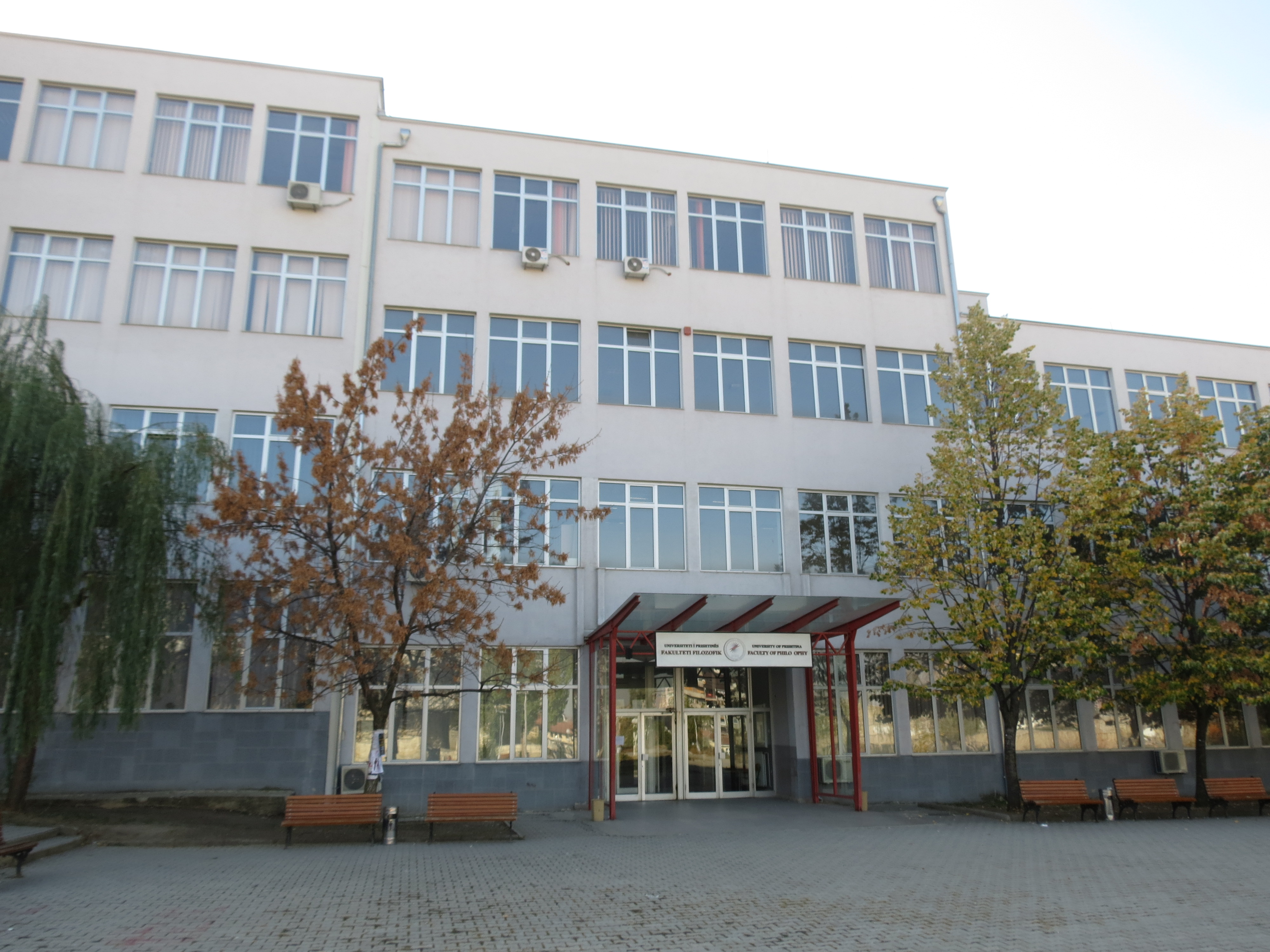
Faculty of Philosophy

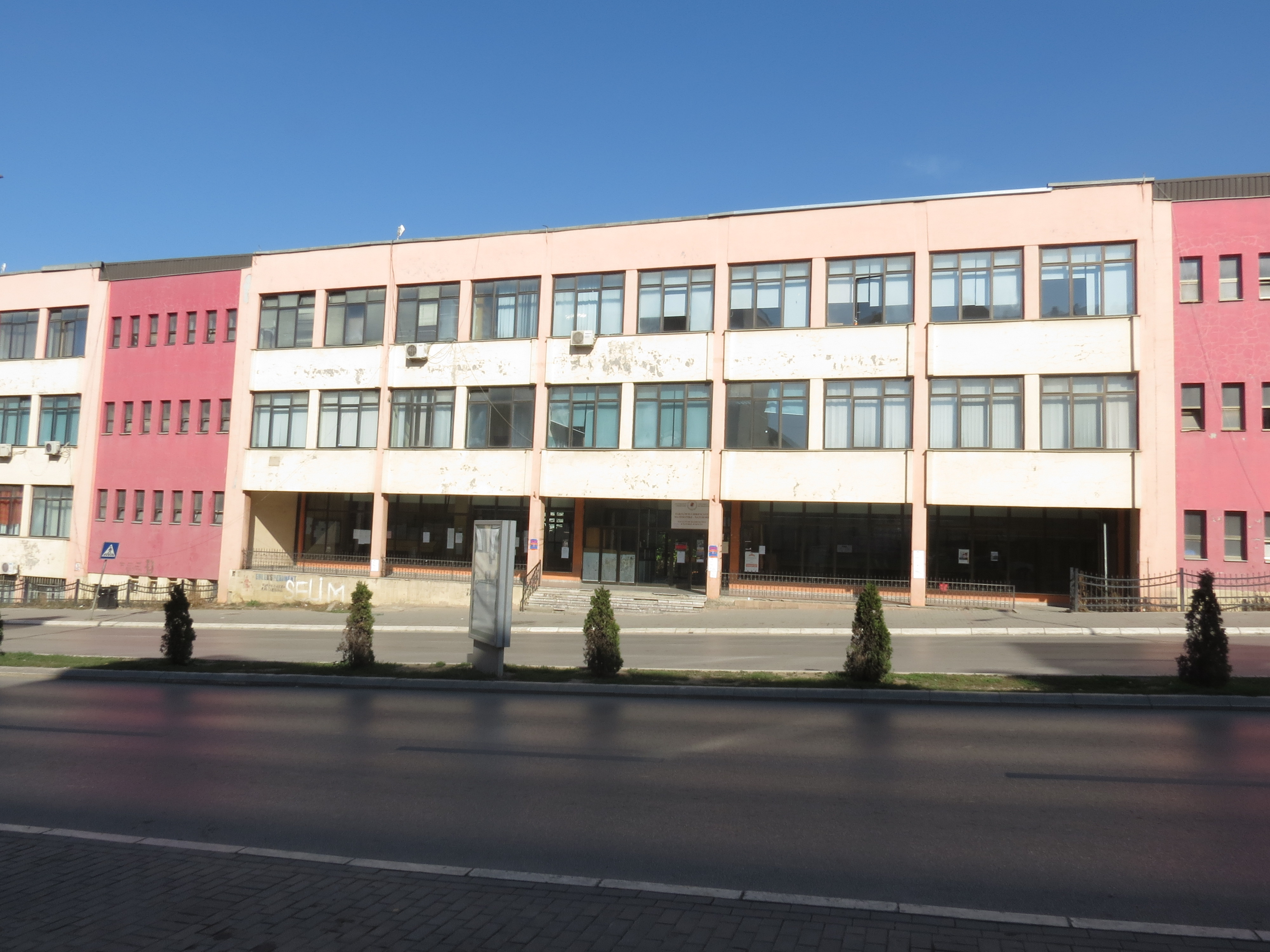
Faculty of Mathematics and Natural Sciences

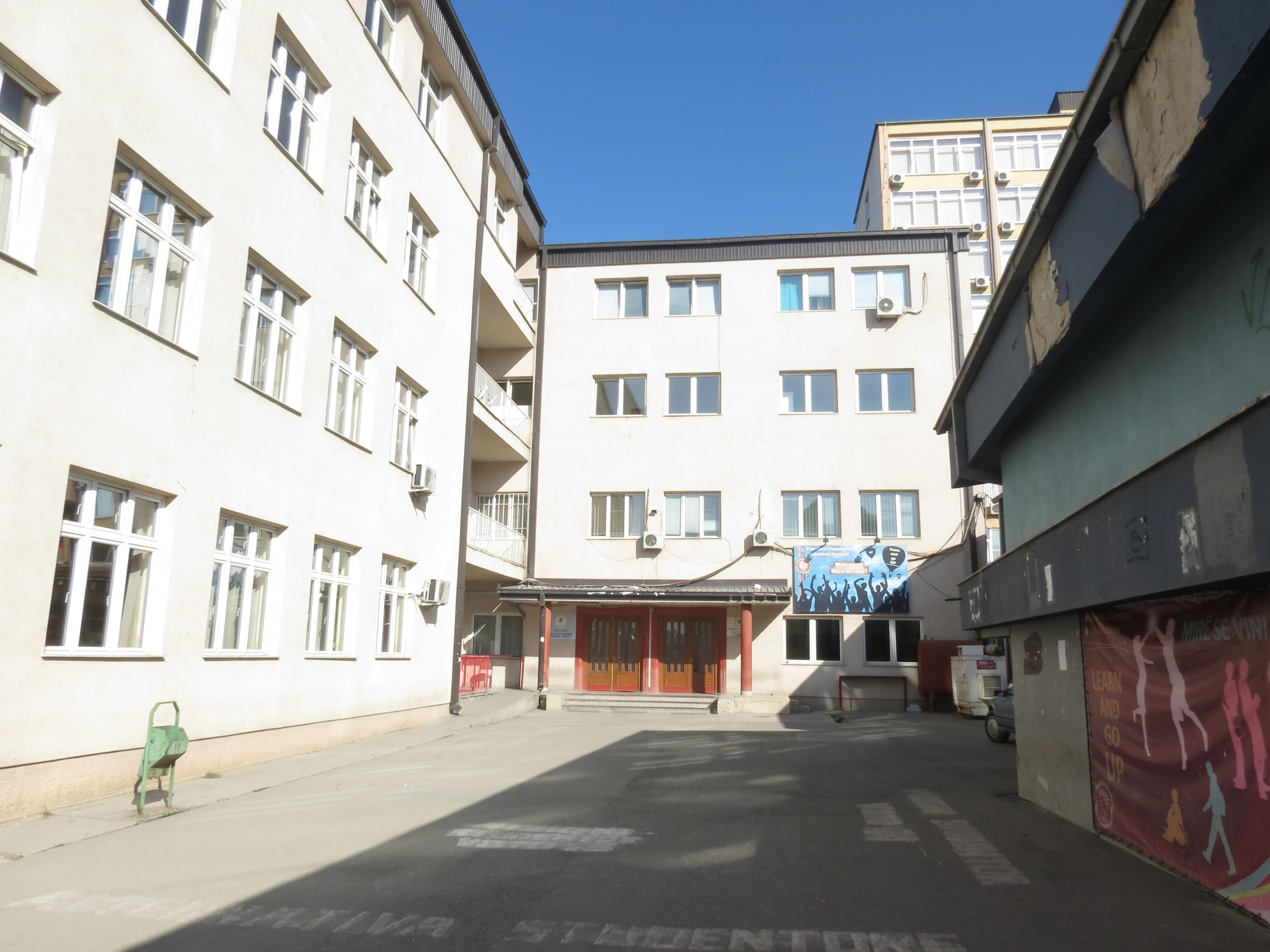
Faculty of Law and Economics

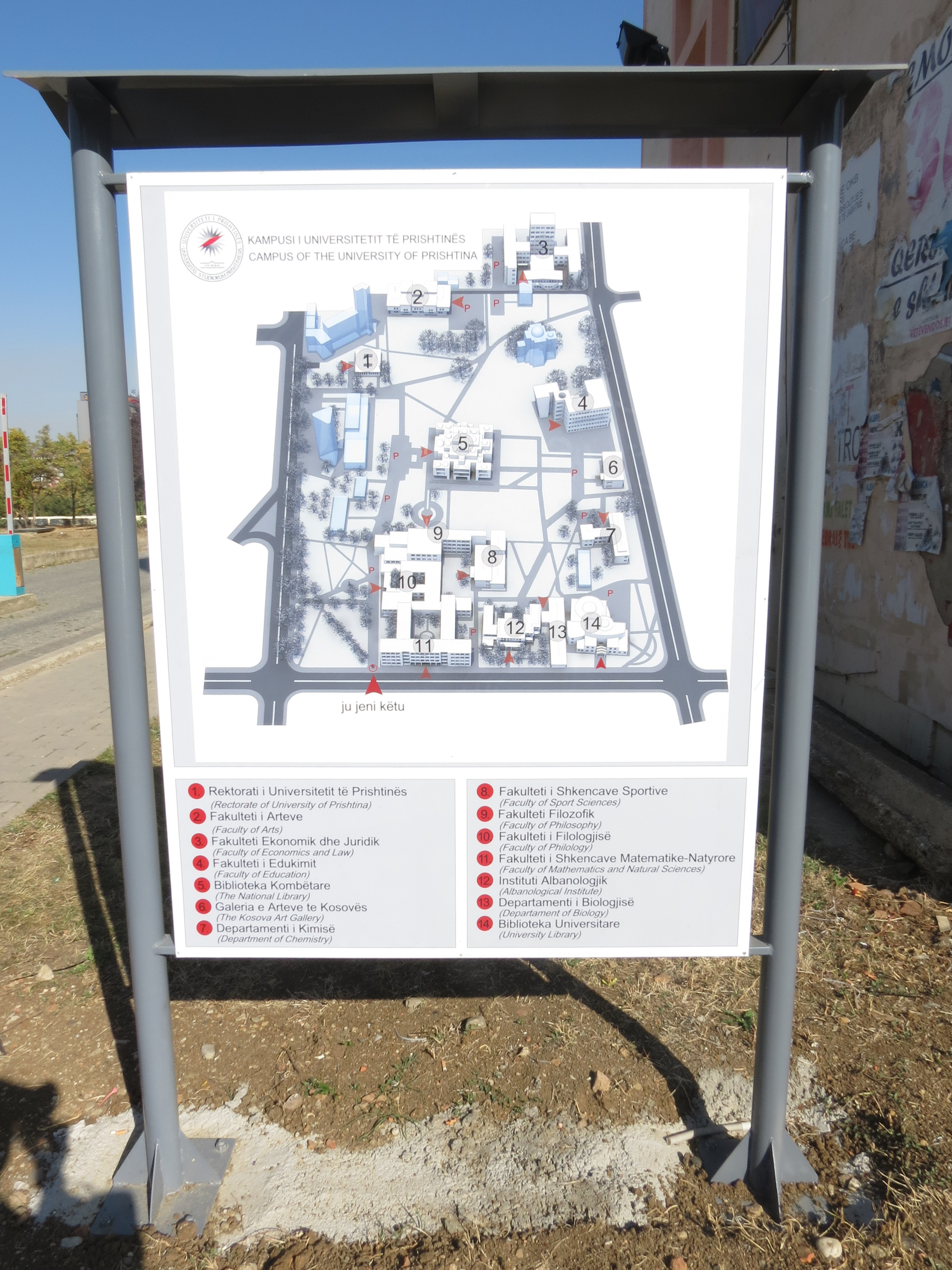
Campus

The University of Pristina (Albanian: Universiteti i Prishtinës) (Note: Also known as the Hasan Prishtina University of Pristina (Albanian: Universiteti i Prishtinës "Hasan Prishtina").) is a public university located in Pristina, Kosovo. It is the institution that emerged after the disestablishment of the University of Pristina (1969–1999) as a result of the Kosovo War. The inauguration of the university was a historical occurrence not only for the people of Kosovo, but for the whole Albanian nation. On 15 February, the solemn Parliament session took place, which is also proclaimed as The University of Pristina's Day. In the composition of the newly established University of Pristina were faculties with their headquarters in Pristina: the Faculty of Philosophy, Faculty of Law and Economics, Faculty of Engineering and Faculty of Medicine. Now the University of Pristina has 17 faculties, of which 14 are academic faculties and 3 are faculties of applied sciences. Contained within the emblem is a translation of the name into Latin, Universitas Studiorum Prishtiniensis.

== Overview ==
The University of Pristina occupies the campus in Pristina, serving as the major university in the area of Kosovo. It is a member of the European University Association. It maintains contacts with Western European and American universities and institutions. University of Pristina is the highest-ranked Albanian-language university in Europe. University of Pristina is a non-profit public higher education institution located in the urban setting of the medium-sized city of Pristina. This institution has also branch campuses in the following location(s): Gjilan, Peja, Prizren, Ferizaj, Gjakova, Mitrovica. Officially accredited and/or recognized by the Ministry of Education, Science and Technology of Kosovo, the University of Pristina is a coeducational higher education institution. The University of Pristina offers courses and programs leading to officially recognized higher education degrees such as bachelor's degrees, master's degrees, doctorate degrees in several areas of study.

=== Statistics and university organisation ===
The academic year of the university runs from 1 October through 30 September, organised in two semesters, with 30 weeks of teaching per year. With youth up to 19 years of age accounting for over 50 per cent of the population, by 1980, every third inhabitant in the province was enrolled either in school or at the university. In Kosovo, the expansion of the student body in higher education was unparalleled in Yugoslavia, rising from 149 in 1958–59 to 35,706 at the university and other post-secondary educational institutions in 1975–76. In the academic year 2016—2017 the university counted 38,974 active students, 17,042 (43.8%) men and 21,932 (56.2%) women; 38,334 (98.3%) of the students were from Kosovo, 413 (1%) from Preševo, Medveđa and Bujanovac, 99 (0.25%) from Montenegro, 56 (0.14%) from North Macedonia, 49 (0.12%) from Albania, and 23 (0.06%) from other countries.

About 5,000 students receive bachelor, and about 1000 master degrees every year at University of Pristina, the majority in social and human sciences. More than 70,000 have graduated from the university since its establishment.

Unlike most other European universities, the university operates as a loose association of faculties, each with a legally autonomous status and administrative structure. This has been criticized by the World Bank as leading to a redundant duplication of programmes and facilities, hindering an effective prioritisation of programmes.

== History ==
The university of Pristina was founded in the Socialist Autonomous Province of Kosovo, Socialist Republic of Serbia, Yugoslavia, in Pristina, the first academic year being 1969–1970, and functioning until 1999. However, because of political upheaval, war, consecutive expulsion of faculty of one ethnicity or the other, extensive differences between the ethnicities, it separated into two disjoint institutions using the same name, albeit simply to reflect ethnic identity. Albanian-language activity continues to this day in Pristina, whilst the Serbian one, Univerzitet u Prištini, has been located in Northern Mitrovica, where it still maintains its place in the Serbian Education System.

=== Foundation ===
As a result of The League of Communists of Kosovo requesting more self-governance for their region, large-scale protests arose in Kosovo during November 1968, affecting the founding of the university in 1969–70. The university's first faculties were those of philosophy, medicine, law and engineering. The languages of instruction were Albanian and Serbo-Croat. Because the organizational status of the institution was language-based it is often considered as two separate universities. The Albanians welcomed the founding of the university, but only considered it as a milestone towards political equality and not as the final goal. Although it was supported by Josip Broz Tito, President of the League of Communists of Yugoslavia, it faced a lot of political opposition from the Serbian Communists, who considered it an "indication of autonomy for Kosovo". As early as 1971, the Serbs and Montenetgrins protested against the inauguration of the university.

=== The demonstrations of 1981 ===
The university was the starting point of the 1981 Kosovo student protests. The university contributed to unemployment, with highly educated and aggravated Albanians becoming recruits for nationalist sentiment. Additionally, the Serb and Montenegrin population of Kosovo increasingly resented the economic and social burden incurred by the university's student population. The demonstrations, which started on 11 March 1981, originally started as a spontaneous small-scale protest for better food in the cafeteria and improved housing conditions in the halls of residence and ended with violence provoking mass demonstrations across Kosovo, a state of emergency, riots and numerous casualties.

=== 1990-98 ===
Many Albanian lecturers were accused of breaking the Serbian education laws, dismissed and replaced by Serbs. The Albanian-language education then continued in private facilities, as part of the unofficial parallel shadow state, a self-declared Republic of Kosovo, enabling the education of some 30,000 Albanian students to continue. In the second half of the 1990s, Government of Serbia started negotiations with Albanian leaders about the university and came to the agreement that the Albanians would get control over 60% of the university campus, Serbs 35% and Turks 5%. However, Kosovo Serb protesters staged violent protests against the transfer and eventually had to be evicted by government forces. The buildings were extensively damaged, with furniture and equipment deliberately vandalized as to make them unusable.

=== Kosovo War and aftermath ===
The 1999 War in Kosovo disrupted both the official university and its counterpart branch in Mitrovica. Most of the staff and students had fled from Kosovo in early June 1999. The Serbian population of Pristina, in August 1999, had fallen from 40,000 to under 1,000. As a result, the university broke into two separate branches, the one in Pristina and the one in North Mitrovica.

=== December 2013 arrests ===
On December 12, 2013, eleven officials of the university Faculty of Medicine were arrested for grade forgery. Arrested officials were physicians, professors, assistant professors, and administrative staff; some students were also arrested.

=== 2014 student protest and resignation of Ibrahim Gashi ===
The 2014 student protest began when Kosovo media accused Rector Ibrahim Gashi and his staff of falsifying research and publishing scientific papers based on that false research to bolster their academic credentials. Gashi refused to resign after it was revealed he had published articles in predatory journals to meet the requirements for promotion to full professor. Student protesters became outraged after parliament failed to pass a vote demanding that Gashi resign, with coalition government political parties opposing the move. Gashi eventually resigned.

== Organisation and administration ==
=== Governance ===
The main governing bodies of the University of Pristina are the steering council and the Senate. The steering council has overall strategic responsibility for the effective institutional functioning of the university.

The University Senate is the highest academic body of the university. It is chaired by the rector of the university, which is the university's main managing authority. The rector is the main academic and administrative leader and is responsible for the effective and regular work of the university and for its management according to the policy defined by the steering council. The rector is assisted by the vice presidents and the secretary general of the university. The duties of the vice-rectors are determined by the rector in accordance with the provisions of the UP Statute.

The secretary general of the university is the highest executive and administrative officer of the university. He answers the rector for efficient, economical and effective administration at all levels of the university.

=== Administration ===
The Central Administration of the University of Pristina was established by the decision of the University Board of Pristina in 2001.

According to the Statute of the university, the Central Administration is responsible for professional, administrative and technical issues related to:

1. Education, scientific research and artistic work;
2. Administration of recognition of studies;
3. Personnel administration;
4. Legal Aspects;
5. University Development Plan;
6. Accounting and finance;
7. Maintenance and documentation of property;
8. Folders;
9. Movement of goods;
10. Management of the information system;
11. Central database;
12. Other General Aspects of University Administration.

All these are coordinated by the secretary-general.

At the suggestion of the secretary-general, the rector issues regulations on job placement within the Central University Administration. A more detailed description of the work for Central Administration services is provided in Regulation on the internal organization of the Central Administration of the university.

== Faculties ==
The university's academic units are:

- Faculty of Philosophy
- Faculty of Mathematics and Natural Sciences
- Faculty of Philology
- Faculty of Law
- Faculty of Economics
- Faculty of Civil Engineering
- Faculty of Electrical and Computer Engineering
- Faculty of Mechanical Engineering
- Faculty of Medicine
- Faculty of Arts
- Faculty of Agriculture and Veterinary
- Faculty of Sport Sciences
- Faculty of Education
- Faculty of Architecture

== Admissions and fees ==
This higher-education institution has a selective admission policy based on entrance examinations. International applicants are eligible to apply for enrollment. Fees per semester at the University of Pristina include €25 for full-time students (BA), €125 for part-time students (BA), and €150 for Academic Masters (MA). Students coming from other cities or international students require around 200-350 euros per month to cover the cost of living in Pristina.

== University campus ==
Around 45,000 students attend the University of Pristina (UP), but the students are not the only ones who use it. This fact gives the UP another concern, and that is the accommodation of other activities that are not related to the UP. The campus has a position in the city of Pristina, and that gives the UP potential to work on and improve all the problems that exist in Pristina.

=== The National Library ===
The National Library of Kosovo is located in the campus of UP. This library is the highest library institution in Kosovo established by the Parliament. It accepts donations; one from ORCA was accepted recently. The mission of the library is to collect, promote and preserve documents that are important for the state. They hold exhibitions, gatherings and they have a considerable and accessible number of books. This library is known for its history and architecture. Nevertheless, there is controversy for the beauty of the outside appearance of the library.

=== Halls of Residence ===
The campus contains eight halls of residence. They are considered affordable for all students. Moreover, in the per-month-price is included the food in the students' canteen center.

== Pristina International Summer University ==
In 2001, the University of Pristina began the establishment of Pristina Summer University. More than 4,000 local, regional and international students and more than 400 local and international professors partici pate in the PISU.

In the summer of 2018, the University of Pristina (UP) organised the 18th edition of the Pristina International Summer University. The program brought together local and international professors and lecturers for two weeks, and provided approximately 15 credited courses covering a wide range of study fields. In addition, public discussions, lectures etc., were organized on prominent issues of Kosovar and (South) East European societies. Recreational events and excursions have also been organized for students and staff. Pristina International Summer University 2017, hosted approximately 500 students. In this year's program, approximately 300 participants were accepted, out of which 150 from Kosovo and 150 participants from abroad. A list of the available courses can be found in the University Of Pristina official website. PISU is organized every year, in the first week of July and it aims to establish and expand the cooperation between the University of Pristina and international universities. In 2023, from July 3-14, the 22nd International Summer University was held at the University of Pristina with the participation of professors from 11 countries and 30 different universities. In this context, the talks with representatives of Rotary International also took place. The Germany-Kosovo Country Committee is planning another international workshop at the university in 2024.

== Career Development Centre of the University of Pristina ==
The Career Development Centre of the University of Pristina has been officially opened since April 2007 as an OSCE project, while since January 2009, it functions as a Unit of the Academic Development Office in the University of Pristina. The Career Development Center's objectives are to help the UP students in gaining knowledge and developing their skills, which will help them during their employment. It also aims to help students in gaining work experience during their studies, in order for them to understand more about the world of the job market, as well as in offering advice and information for the high school graduates who want to study in UP. They tend to achieve these goals by enabling students access to new information on studies, trainings, seminars, lectures, various activities, as well as information about job vacancies and practical work.

=== Virtual Career Platform ===
VCP (PVK) is the Virtual Career Platform by which the students and the graduates can participate in the Virtual Career Fair. Through online access the navigators can be meet with institutions, companies and organizations by clicking on these sectors: Banking, Finance, Information Technology, Engineering, Architecture, Design, Consulting, and Education. Through biz-form, one can communicate directly with the institutions’ human resources departments, companies, and organizations, participants in VCP (PVK). VCP (PVK) provides information about: Career education and orientation, high school graduates information, counsel for students, general information about VCP (PVK). CDC (QZHK) online services are free for the students and the graduates from the University of Pristina “Hasan Prishtina”.

== Notable people ==
=== Notable alumni and faculty members ===
- Fehmi Agani, sociologist and politician
- Idriz Ajeti, linguist and professor
- Ag Apolloni, writer and professor of literature
- Faruk Begolli, actor and professor
- Gani Bobi, sociologist and professor
- Flora Brovina, poet, pediatrician and women's rights activist
- Fahri Beqiri, Kosovar composer
- Hysen Bytyqi, professor of animal Science and vice-rector at the University of Pristina
- Masar Caka, Kosovar painter
- Nexhat Daci, former Speaker of the Assembly of Kosovo, former professor of chemistry
- Fatmir Dalladaku, cardiac surgeon who performed the first open-heart surgery in Kosovo
- Jusuf Gërvalla,was a Kosovo Albanian activist, writer, and musician
- Sabri Hamiti, Writer and professor of literature
- Ukshin Hoti, Kosovar professor, philosopher, and political activist
- Ylber Hysa, Kosovar historian and diplomat
- Hilmi Ibar, professor of chemistry and former dean of pedagogics at Trakya University Edirne
- Atifete Jahjaga, former president of Kosovo
- Naim Jerliu, physician and politician
- Muhamedin Kullashi, philosopher, professor and politician
- Albin Kurti, current prime minister of Kosovo
- Blerim Latifi, philosopher and professor
- Muslim Mulliqi, painter and professor
- Vjosa Osmani, current president of Kosovo and former chairwoman of the Assembly of Kosovo
- Enver Petrovci, actor and professor
- Ali Podrimja, Kosovar poet
- Luljeta Pula, professor and politician
- Isa Qosja, film director and professor
- Rexhep Qosja, Kosovar writer, professor and academic
- Ibrahim Rugova, first president of post-war Kosovo
- Astrit Salihu, philosopher and professor
- Fatmir Sejdiu, former president of Kosovo and former professor of law
- Haris Silajdžić, former prime minister and member of the Presidency of Bosnia and Herzegovina
- Azem Shkreli, Kosovar poet
- Hashim Thaçi, former president of Kosovo, former prime minister of Kosovo, former student vice-rector

== Criticism ==
The University of Pristina has been criticized for its association with the political class, corruption, and lack of literature. According to a recent study by Preportr, a substantial part of Kosovo's government officials, including ministers, hold academic roles in higher education institutions, including the University of Pristina. Literature in Albanian is highly absent, and the available literature is largely outdated.

Some 15 high-profile politicians were serving as ministers or MPs in 2015, including the ministers of justice, education, and defense, and receiving salaries as full-time professors. Reformist Rector Ramadan Zejnullahu stripped them of their pay for work that they did not perform. Another 80 or so professors were receiving double or triple salaries for teaching at multiple faculties or branches of the university in other cities in Kosovo. Attempts to stop this were overturned by the appeal court. Zejnullahu also chose to disregard a policy that let 1,000 children of war veterans or soldiers killed in action register for university without passing an entrance exam, believing it to be unfair and against university standards. After a year and a half, Zejnullahu was fired by the university steering board on 21 October 2015. Zejnullahu's removal was reversed days later by Education Minister Arsim Bajrami, but his struggle made him a national symbol of Kosovo's battle against nepotism and graft.

Two professors, Beqir Sadikaj and Zeqir Veselaj, who had earlier been identified as plagiarists were in 2015 elected as members to the 5-member Governing Council of the UP and voted to dismiss Rector Zejnullahu.

=== Improvement to be made ===
Since its foundation, the University of Pristina has made many improvements. Nevertheless, it is still facing difficulties. A primary concern is the lack of work space and absence of professors. Moreover, plagiarism, lack of infrastructure and other commitments of the professors outside of university of Pristina, continue to hinder the operating of the university. Researchers found out that the campus is used more as a transit area for citizens than the students, and it also misses links between the buildings inside the campus.

A concerning fact is that even though the findings directly disclosed names of the staff who plagiarized, they continued to be employed by the university, unpunished. In addition, politics always seem to influence the university. In 2003, the University of Pristina was described as being "at the very core of political conflict and the self-esteem of Albanian Kosovars".

== See also ==
- List of split up universities
