= 2004 Kosovan presidential election =

- 3 December 2004

120 members of the Assembly of Kosovo 81 (two-thirds of 120 in first two rounds) or 61 (simple majority of 120 in third round) votes needed to win
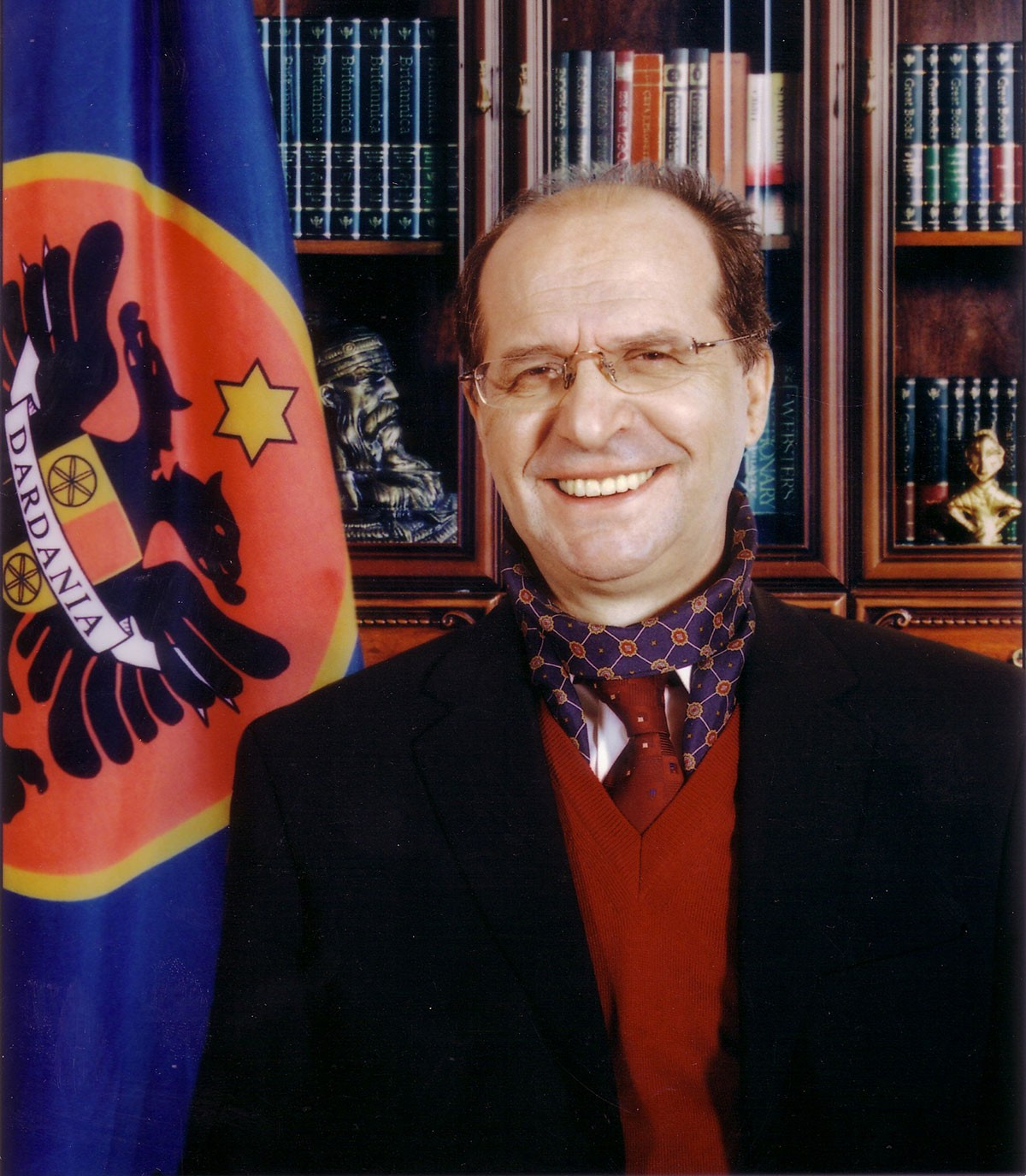

Nominee	Ibrahim Rugova	Ramë Buja
Party	Democratic League of Kosovo	Democratic Party of Kosovo
Electoral vote	66, 63, 64	34, 34, Withdrew in 3rd round
Percentage	66.7%
President before election
Ibrahim Rugova
LDK
Elected President
Ibrahim Rugova
LDK

An indirect election for the President of the Provisional Institutions of Self-Government in Kosovo was held on 3 December 2004 by the 120-member Assembly of Kosovo. This was not an election for the president of an independent state, but rather for the presidency of the Provisional Institutions of Self-Government (PISG) operating strictly under the administration of the United Nations Interim Administration Mission in Kosovo (UNMIK), in accordance with United Nations Security Council Resolution 1244.

This was the second presidential election held under the UNMIK-administered Constitutional Framework for Provisional Self-Government in Kosovo. It directly followed the 23 October 2004 parliamentary elections, which established the second mandate of the PISG assembly.

Unlike the 2002 Kosovan presidential election, which utilized an open-ballot package deal to elect the president and government simultaneously without counter-candidates, the 2004 election featured a direct opposition candidate. The incumbent president, Ibrahim Rugova of the Democratic League of Kosovo (LDK), was symbolically challenged by Ramë Buja, nominated by the Democratic Party of Kosovo (PDK). After neither candidate secured the requisite 80-vote two-thirds majority in the first two rounds of secret voting, Buja withdrew from the race. Rugova was subsequently re-elected in the third round with 64 votes out of the 99 ballots cast, successfully securing the simple majority of the 120-member Assembly necessary to win.

== Background ==
The 2004 Kosovan presidential election was a direct constitutional consequence of the parliamentary elections held on 23 October 2004. Following the conclusion of the first three-year mandate of the Provisional Institutions of Self-Government (PISG), the October elections necessitated the formation of a new legislative and executive branch strictly governed by the United Nations Interim Administration Mission in Kosovo (UNMIK) under the Constitutional Framework for Provisional Self-Government. In contrast to the 2001 elections, the 2004 parliamentary elections were administered almost entirely by Kosovo-run bodies, with the Organization for Security and Co-operation in Europe (OSCE) having transferred administrative functions to the Central Election Commission (KQZ) secretariat in late 2003.

The political climate preceding the presidential election was highly dynamic and marked by a significant shift in Kosovo's post-war political landscape. Following the parliamentary elections, the moderate Democratic League of Kosovo (LDK), led by the incumbent President Ibrahim Rugova, emerged once again as the largest political force, securing 47 out of 120 seats in the Assembly of Kosovo. However, falling short of an absolute majority, the LDK was compelled to seek coalition partners to form a government and secure the necessary votes for the presidency.

This period saw intense political negotiations and a departure from the previous broad, all-inclusive unity government model that had characterized Kosovo's first PISG mandate. President Rugova and the LDK opted to form a "narrow" center-right governing coalition with the Alliance for the Future of Kosovo (AAK), led by Ramush Haradinaj, alongside several non-Serb minority parties. Under this power-sharing agreement, it was stipulated that Ibrahim Rugova would retain the position of President of Kosovo, while Ramush Haradinaj would be mandated as the new Prime Minister of Kosovo. This strategic alliance fundamentally altered the relations between the major Albanian political parties. The Democratic Party of Kosovo (PDK), led by Hashim Thaçi, which had secured 30 seats to become the second-largest party, vehemently opposed the LDK-AAK pact. The PDK had advocated for a broad unity coalition and, upon being excluded from the executive arrangement, declared its intention to act as a formidable parliamentary opposition. This marked a maturing phase in Kosovo's political development, establishing a clear government-opposition dynamic for the first time since the establishment of the UNMIK administration.

In contrast with the government formed following the 2002 election, which resulted from international pressure after Kosovo's inability to agree on a viable formula, the 2004 government was elected entirely through the free will of Kosovo Assembly members. The opposition consists of two main parties, the Democratic Party of Kosovo (PDK) and Party ORA. The emergence of the newly formed reformist party ORA, led by Veton Surroi, which secured 7 seats and also joined the opposition bloc, further fragmented the Assembly, making the numerical threshold for electing the president highly dependent on strict coalition loyalty. Consequently, when the inaugural session of the Assembly convened in early December to elect the President, the process was highly polarized. Unlike the 2002 election where the president was elected through a consensus package deal, the 2004 election was contested, with the opposition PDK fielding Ramë Buja as a counter-candidate specifically to challenge Rugova's dominance and protest the LDK-AAK political monopoly.

=== Serbian minority boycott ===
The 120-seat Assembly constitutionally reserved 20 seats for ethnic minorities (10 for Serbs, and 10 for other non-Serb communities). However, the participation of the Kosovo Serb community in the 2004 process was severely hindered by a strict boycott. Citing poor security conditions, lack of freedom of movement, and direct political directives from the government in Belgrade (specifically from Serbian Prime Minister Vojislav Koštunica), the local Serb population overwhelmingly refused to vote.

Voter turnout among the Serb demographic collapsed to less than 1%. Despite this, the UNMIK Constitutional Framework legally required the 10 set-aside Serb seats to be allocated. They were given to the only two participating Serb entities: the Serbian List for Kosovo and Metohija (SLKM) led by Oliver Ivanović received 8 seats, and the Citizens' Initiative of Serbia (CIS) led by Slaviša Petković received 2 seats, drawing a combined total of fewer than 2,000 votes overall. While these representatives officially took office, ensuring institutional continuity, they functioned with minimal popular legitimacy and largely abstained from the Assembly's plenary sessions, including heavily boycotting the December presidential vote.

== Electoral system ==
The President was elected indirectly by the 120 members of the Assembly of Kosovo.

To formally enter the race, a candidate needed the backing of either the largest political party in the Assembly or at least 25 signatures from the Assembly's deputies. At the time of the 2004 election, the Constitutional Framework stipulated that the President's mandate would last for exactly 3 years (this was later amended to 5 years prior to the 2008 election).

The election procedure mandated a secret ballot:

- First and Second Rounds: A candidate was required to receive a two-thirds supermajority of the votes from all 120 registered members of the Assembly (meaning 81 votes were needed to win).
- Third Round: If no candidate managed to achieve the 80-vote threshold after two rounds of voting, a third round would be organized. In this final round, the requirement was lowered to a simple majority of all 120 members of the Assembly (61 votes).

If a candidate failed to secure 61 votes in the third round, the Assembly would be automatically dissolved, and extraordinary parliamentary elections would be called.

== Candidates ==
- Ibrahim Rugova (LDK): The incumbent president, historically regarded as the leader of the peaceful Albanian resistance in the 1990s, and the head of the LDK. Rugova was the consensus candidate of the newly formed LDK-AAK governing coalition.
- Ramë Buja (PDK): A prominent figure within the PDK, a former KLA official, and a member of the Kosovo Albanian delegation at the 1999 Rambouillet talks. Buja was nominated by the PDK specifically to symbolically challenge Rugova and protest the LDK-AAK power-sharing agreement, ensuring that Rugova would not run completely uncontested.

Democratic League of Kosovo
For President
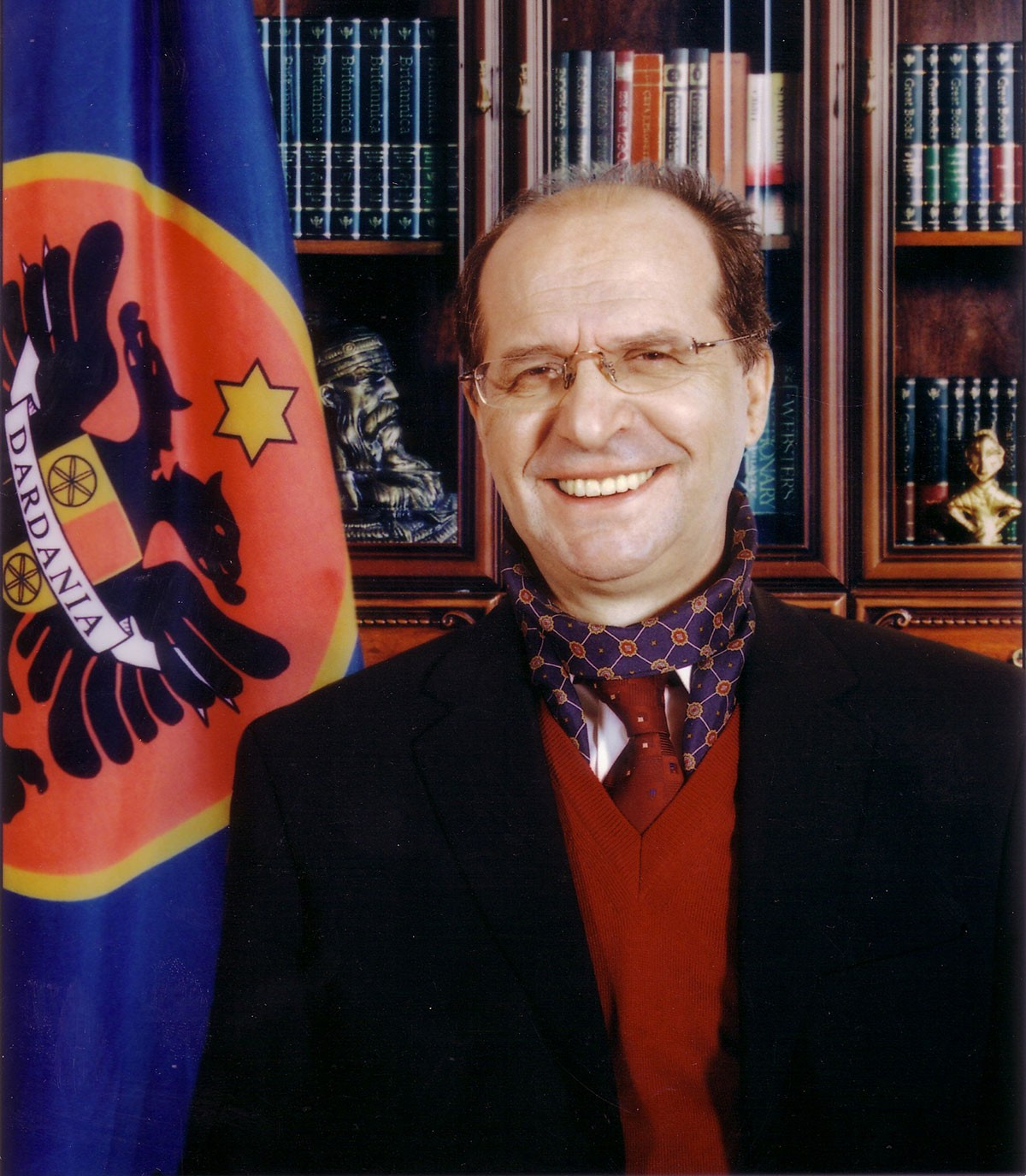
Ibrahim Rugova
President of the PISG

Democratic Party of Kosovo
For President
Ramë Buja
Member of Assembly

== Session and Voting ==
=== Election of the Speaker of the Assembly ===
The inaugural session of the second mandate of the Assembly of Kosovo convened on 3 December 2004. As the oldest elected deputy, academic Mark Krasniqi (representing the Albanian Christian Democratic Party of Kosovo) served as the acting chairman to preside over the initial proceedings. The session was formally addressed by the UNMIK SRSG, Søren Jessen-Petersen, who congratulated the newly elected members but stressed the need for the Assembly to deliver real progress on democratic standards.

Before voting for the President of Kosovo, the Assembly proceeded to elect the President of the Assembly (Speaker). The LDK nominated the incumbent, Nexhat Daci. This nomination was openly opposed by the newly formed reformist party ORA. Its leader, Veton Surroi, urged the LDK to reconsider their choice, heavily criticizing Daci's previous tenure as "inefficient and exclusionary", and called for a more unifying figure to lead the parliament.

Despite this vocal opposition, in a vote chaired by Krasniqi, the Assembly overwhelmingly approved the appointment. Daci was comfortably re-elected with 99 votes in favor out of the 109 deputies present.

Results for the election of the Speaker of the Assembly
Candidate	Party	Votes	%
Nexhat Daci	LDK	99	90.8%
Against		7	6.4%
Abstentions		3	2.8%
Total ballots cast		109	100%
Members present		109	90.8%
Registered members of the Assembly		120	100%

=== Presidential Election ===
Following the confirmation of the Assembly presidency, the session moved to the secret ballot for the President of Kosovo. Unlike the 2002 election, where the President and Prime Minister were voted on together in a single open ballot to preserve a fragile post-war unity pact, the 2004 election strictly adhered to the Constitutional Framework's standard procedure of secret ballots for the presidency alone.

During the session, the Assembly Speaker, Nexhat Daci, attempted to alter the Constitutional Framework's established procedure to avoid a prolonged voting process. Noting that the election featured opposing candidates, Daci proposed that the rules be broken so the candidate with the most votes in the first round would automatically be declared the winner. This proposal was fiercely rejected by the opposition parties, and it was ultimately decided to adhere strictly to the established three-round voting rules.

During the first and second rounds of voting, both Ibrahim Rugova and Ramë Buja were on the ballot. Due to the fragmented nature of the Assembly and the strict 80-vote threshold, neither candidate secured the two-thirds supermajority necessary to win outright. The PDK overwhelmingly voted for Buja, while the LDK-AAK coalition and aligned minorities voted for Rugova. In the first round, 100 ballots were cast; Rugova obtained 65 votes, Buja 34, and 1 ballot was invalid. In the second round, Rugova obtained 63 votes, Buja 34, and 3 ballots were invalid.

Recognizing that the LDK-AAK coalition possessed the simple majority (61 votes) needed to win the third round, the PDK's candidate, Ramë Buja, voluntarily withdrew his candidacy before the third round commenced. Consequently, Ibrahim Rugova proceeded to the third round as the sole candidate, requiring only 61 "Yes" votes.

=== Results ===
In the third round, 99 out of the 120 Assembly members were present and cast their ballots. The absent members primarily included the boycotting Serb minority representatives and several deputies who chose not to participate in the final vote.

Ibrahim Rugova received 64 votes in favor, successfully surpassing the 61-vote threshold required for re-election. There were 32 votes cast against him (primarily from the opposition PDK), and 3 ballots were declared invalid.

Results of the 2004 Kosovan presidential election
Candidate	Party	First round		Second round		Third round	
Candidate	Party	Votes	%	Votes	%	Votes	%
Ibrahim Rugova	LDK	65	65.7%	63	64.9%	64	66.7%
Ramë Buja	PDK	34	34.3%	34	35.1%	Withdrew	
Against		—		—		32	33.3%
Invalid/blank ballots		1	—	3	—	3	—
Valid votes		99	99.0%	97	97.0%	96	97.0%
Required majority		81 votes		81 votes		61 votes	
Total ballots cast		100	83.3%	100	83.3%	99	82.5%
Members present		108	90.0%	106	88.3%	99	82.5%
Registered members of the Assembly		120	100%	120	100%	120	100%

== Aftermath ==
Following his successful re-election on 3 December 2004, President Ibrahim Rugova immediately proceeded to officially nominate Ramush Haradinaj to Prime Minister. Later that same day, the Assembly of Kosovo held a vote to approve the new LDK-AAK coalition government. Haradinaj was successfully elected as the Prime Minister of Kosovo, receiving 72 votes in favor from the deputies present, solidifying the new power-sharing pact.

The newly elected executive branch was structured to reflect the coalition agreement and the Constitutional Framework's requirements for minority representation. Led by Prime Minister Haradinaj, the government cabinet consisted of a Deputy Prime Minister and six ministers from the Democratic League of Kosovo (LDK), four ministers from the Alliance for the Future of Kosovo (AAK), and one minister representing non-Serb and non-Albanian minority political parties. In accordance with the legal framework, two ministerial positions were reserved for representatives of the Serbian community.

Results for the election of the Prime Minister and Government cabinet
Candidate	Party	Votes	%
Ramush Haradinaj	AAK	72	91.1%
Against		2	2.5%
Abstentions		5	6.3%
Total ballots cast		79	100%

The reaction from Serbian political leaders in the Assembly was marked by skepticism and specific demands. Oliver Ivanović, leader of the Serbian List for Kosovo and Metohija (SLKM), characterized the composition of the new institutions as expected but expressed deep-seated reservations regarding Haradinaj's appointment. Ivanović emphasized that a "huge distrust" existed due to Haradinaj's wartime past, arguing that it would be difficult for the new Prime Minister to establish a meaningful dialogue with both the local Serb community and Belgrade. Furthermore, Ivanović predicted that the new government would face significant challenges in cooperating with the European Union and NATO. Conversely, Slaviša Petković, leader of the Citizens' Initiative Serbia (CIS), did not directly challenge the election of the institutions but insisted that the government must deliver "concrete progress" regarding the demands of Kosovo Serbs, specifically focusing on the process of returning displaced persons to their homes.

The political stability born from the election was soon tested. Just 100 days into his mandate, on 8 March 2005, Prime Minister Haradinaj resigned after the International Criminal Tribunal for the former Yugoslavia (ICTY) unsealed a war crimes indictment against him. He voluntarily surrendered to the Hague tribunal to clear his name, and the coalition subsequently appointed Bajram Kosumi as his successor to maintain the LDK-AAK power-sharing agreement.

President Rugova continued to serve out his second mandate while actively managing the delicate pre-status negotiations for Kosovo's future. However, in late August 2005, he was diagnosed with lung cancer. Rugova succumbed to the illness on 21 January 2006, leaving a significant political vacuum in the buildup to the final status talks. Following constitutional protocols, Assembly President Nexhat Daci assumed the role of Acting President until the Assembly convened for an early presidential election in February 2006, which resulted in the election of Fatmir Sejdiu as the new president.
