= Justina Shiroka Pula =

President of Kosovo since 2026

- Official portrait, 2026

President of Kosovo
- Incumbent
- Assumed office 7 October 2026
- Prime Minister: Albin Kurti
- Preceded by: Albulena Haxhiu (acting)

President of the Kosova Academy of Sciences and Arts
- In office 19 December 2025 – 6 October 2026
- Preceded by: Mehmet Kraja
- Succeeded by: Fejzullah Krasniqi

Member of the Assembly of Kosovo
- In office 21 February 2011 – 7 May 2014
- Parliamentary group: Democratic

Minister of Energy and Mining of Kosovo
- In office 8 January 2008 – 21 February 2011
- President: Fatmir Sejdiu; Jakup Krasniqi (acting)
- Prime Minister: Hashim Thaçi
- Preceded by: Ethem Çeku
- Succeeded by: Besim Beqaj

Personal details
- Born: Justina Shiroka; 20 December 1953 (age 72) Pristina, Yugoslavia (now Kosovo)
- Party: Independent (since 2017)
- Other political affiliations: PDK (2008–2017)
- Spouse: Blerim Pula (m. 1977; died 2026)
- Children: 4
- Education: University of Pristina; University of Zagreb
- Occupation: Economist; politician

Justina Shiroka Pula (born 20 December 1953) is a Kosovar politician, author and economist who is currently serving as President of Kosovo since 7 October 2026. She is the third woman to hold the office, after Atifete Jahjaga and Vjosa Osmani. Previously, she served as Minister of Energy and Mining from 2008 to 2011 and as president of the Kosova Academy of Sciences and Arts (ASHAK), becoming the first woman to lead the institution.

On 7 October 2026, she was elected President of Kosovo with 81 votes in the Assembly of Kosovo. She is the oldest president to have ever served in office and also holds the record for receiving the highest number of votes in a parliamentary presidential election.

== Education ==
Pula graduated with a degree in economics from the University of Pristina in 1976, and graduated in the theory and politics of development economics in 1984 from the University of Zagreb. In 1977, Pula obtained her PhD from the Faculty of Economics in Pristina with a thesis entitled ‘’Demographic Investments and Economic Development of Kosovo’’.

== Career ==
She began working at the Central Bank of Kosovo after graduating, and has been a lecturer at the Faculty of Economics at the University of Pristina since 1978.

She has spent her professional career in financial and educational institutions, as well as leading various NGOs in the country. Between 2002 and 2008, she chaired the Board of Directors of the Kosovar Civil Society Foundation. Between 2008 and 2011 she served as Minister of Energy and Mining, and between 2011 and 2014 as a member of the Assembly of Kosovo.

In 2016, Pula was elected a corresponding member of the Kosova Academy of Sciences and Arts and, since 2018, has served as secretary of the Social Sciences Section and a member of the board. In 2020, she was elevated to full academic membership of the Academy. On 19 December 2025, Pula was elected president of the Academy by the institution’s assembly, becoming the first woman to hold the office.

== Presidency ==
On 4 March 2026, media outlets reported that the PDK had proposed her as a potential candidate for the 2026 Kosovan presidential election. However, both Pula and PDK leadership denied the claims that same day.

Shiroka Pula was elected president by the Assembly of Kosovo and sworn in as president on the evening of 6 October 2026, receiving 81 votes in the first round. She was proposed by Prime Minister Albin Kurti after earlier candidates failed to win the backing of the opposition Democratic Party of Kosovo (PDK), ending a deadlock that had left the office vacant since Vjosa Osmani‘s term ended on 4 April 2026.

== Personal life ==
Pula was born on 20 December 1953 in Pristina, then Federal People's Republic of Yugoslavia, present-day capital of Kosovo. She is the daughter of Simon Shiroka, one of Kosovo’s most well known handicraftsmen and craftsman-filigree jewelers in Prizren. She was married to Blerim Pula between 1977, and his death in 2026. She is Roman Catholic, making her the first Catholic president.

== Works ==
- (2013). “Decision-Making Processes” (co-authored with B. Krasniqi), Pristina: Institute of Economic Research, “Globus” (201 pp.): ISBN 978-9951-582-06-3.
- (2007). “Linear Programming Transport Methods”, Pristina: University of Pristina (302 pp.): ISBN 9951-00-044-4 .
- (2006). “Management and Decision-Making” (co-authored with I. Kuka and Krasniqi, B.), Pristina: University of Pristina (399 pp.): ISBN 9951-00-057-6 .

Political offices
Preceded by Albulena Haxhiu; Acting	President of Kosovo; 2026–present	Incumbent
