= 2006 Kosovan presidential election =

Indirect election for the President of Kosovo

- 10 February 2006

120 members of the Assembly of the Republic of Kosovo 80 (1st & 2nd rounds; two-thirds of 120) or simple majority (3rd round) votes needed to win
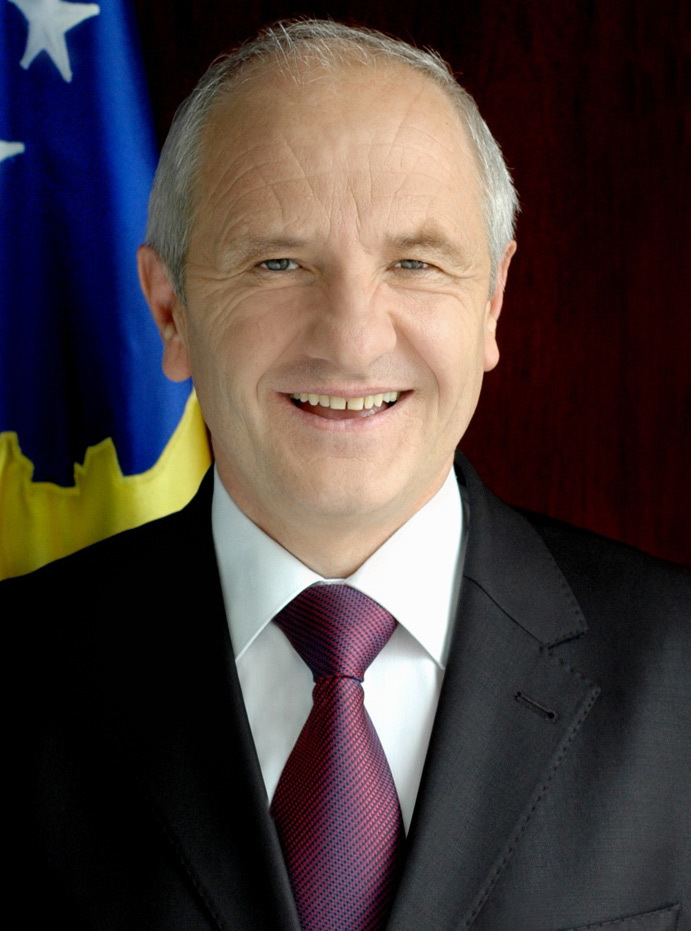
Nominee	Fatmir Sejdiu
Party	LDK
Electoral vote	78, 77, 80
President before election
Ibrahim Rugova (died) / Nexhat Daci (acting)
LDK
Elected President
Fatmir Sejdiu
LDK

An indirect election for the President of Kosovo was held on 10 February 2006. The election by the Assembly of Kosovo was convened following the death of President Ibrahim Rugova on 21 January 2006.

Fatmir Sejdiu of the Democratic League of Kosovo (LDK) was the sole candidate, nominated by his party. No other candidates were proposed.

The election followed the rules of the Constitutional Framework (Section 9.2.8) and the Assembly’s Rules of Procedure: secret ballot, with a two-thirds majority of all 120 members (80 votes) required in the first two rounds. If unsuccessful, a third round would be held (simple majority of votes cast). Ten seats reserved for Serb representatives remained empty due to their ongoing boycott of the Assembly since the March 2004 unrest.

Sejdiu was elected in the third round after receiving exactly 80 votes.

== Background ==
President Ibrahim Rugova died on 21 January 2006 after a long battle with lung cancer. His death created a vacancy in the largely ceremonial but symbolically important office of President. Speaker of the Assembly Nexhat Daci replaced Rugova in an acting capacity.

The Assembly convened a special plenary session on 10 February 2006 (originally planned for 9 February but postponed at the request of the Democratic Party of Kosovo). The session was chaired by Acting President Nexhat Daci. The LDK nominated Sejdiu, a long-time party leader and law professor, as the consensus candidate. Major parties, including the PDK, supported the process as a non-partisan act of unity ahead of status negotiations.

== Results ==
110 members were present (10 seats reserved for Serb representatives remained empty due to the ongoing boycott since the March 2004 unrest). Voting took place in three rounds by secret ballot.

Kolë Berisha (LDK) formally nominated Sejdiu. Hashim Thaçi (PDK) confirmed his party’s positive participation.

Results of the 2006 Kosovan presidential election
Candidate	Party	First round		Second round		Third round	
Candidate	Party	Votes	%	Votes	%	Votes	%
Fatmir Sejdiu	LDK	78	65.0%	77	64.2%	80	73.4%
Against		—	—	—	—	12	11.0%
Invalid ballots		—	—	—	—	17	15.6%
Valid votes		—				92	84.4%
Required majority		80 votes		80 votes		61 votes	
Total ballots cast		—				109	90.8%
110 Members of the Assembly present (10 Serb seats empty due to boycott)
120 registered members of the Assembly

Fatmir Sejdiu was declared elected after the third round.

== Aftermath ==
Sejdiu was sworn in immediately and delivered a short inaugural address emphasizing unity, continuity with Rugova’s legacy, and inter-ethnic cooperation. The election was widely welcomed by the international community (OSCE, EU, UNMIK) as smooth and in full compliance with the Constitutional Framework.

Sejdiu served as President until 2010 (re-elected in 2008).

== Sources ==
- OSCE report on the 10 February 2006 plenary session of the Assembly of Kosovo (primary source for vote counts and procedure)
- UN Secretary-General report S/2006/361 (confirms 80 votes in favour)
- BBC News: New president elected in Kosovo (10 February 2006)
- Radio Free Europe/Radio Liberty: Kosovar Parliament Elects New President
