= 2002 Kosovan presidential election =

Indirect election for the President of Kosovo by the Assembly

- 4 March 2002

120 members of the Assembly of Kosovo 80 (two-thirds of 120 in first two rounds) or simple majority (subsequent rounds; open ballot used for package deal) votes needed to win
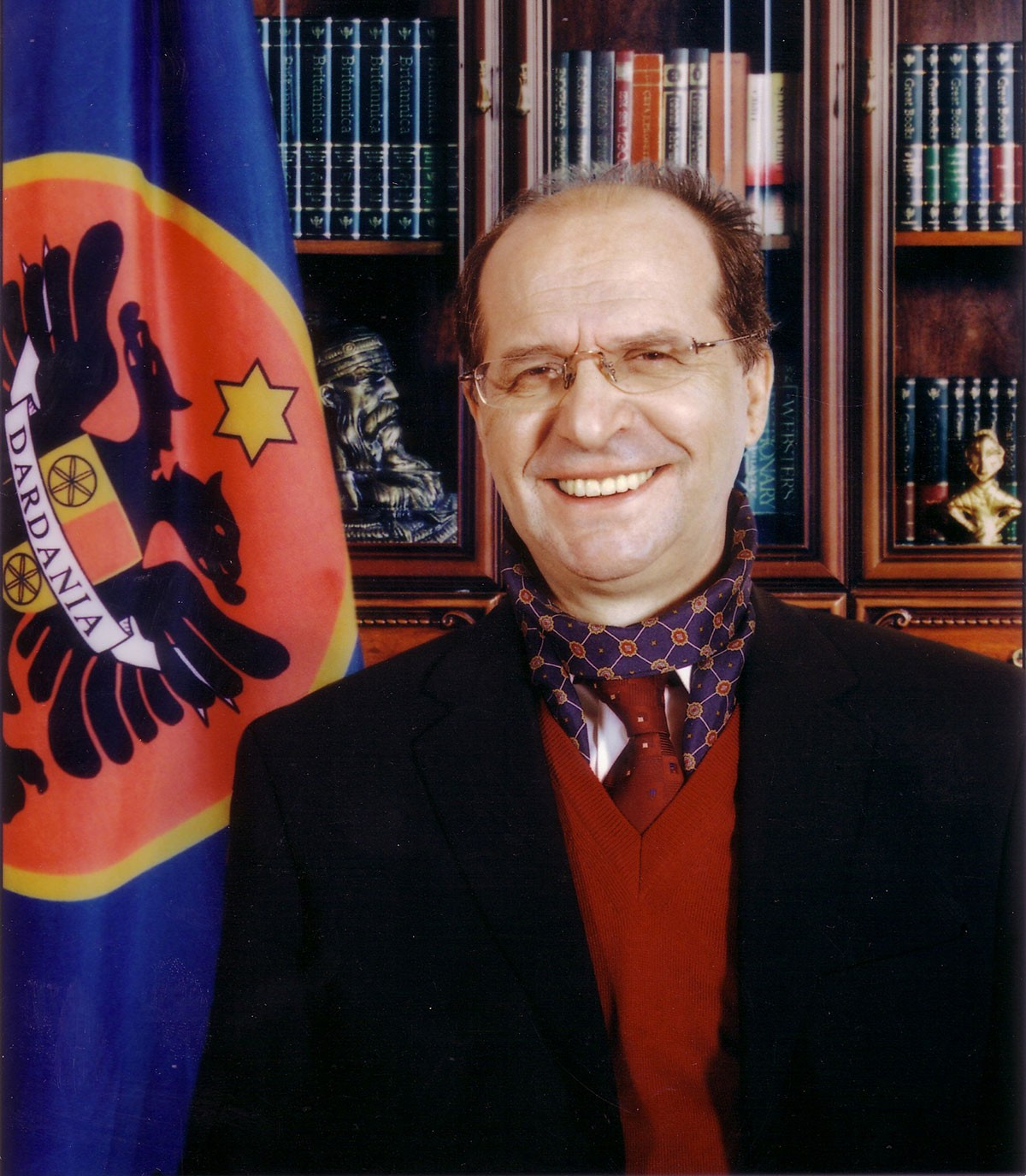
Nominee	Ibrahim Rugova
Party	LDK
Electoral vote	88
Percentage	78.6%
- Result on the presidential election (4 March 2002) For Rugova 88 Against 3 Invalids, blanks, abstentions and absents 29
Elected President
Ibrahim Rugova
LDK

An indirect election for the President of Kosovo was held on 4 March 2002 by the Assembly of Kosovo. This was the first ever election for the office of the President under the UNMIK-administered Constitutional Framework for Provisional Self-Government in Kosovo. It directly followed the 17 November 2001 parliamentary elections, which created the first post-war Transitional Assembly.

It was the first election for the office of President under the Provisional Institutions of Self-Government (PISG) established by the UNMIK. It marked the formal establishment of the Provisional Institutions of Self-Government (PISG) following the November 2001 parliamentary elections.

Ibrahim Rugova of the Democratic League of Kosovo (LDK) was elected in a single open ballot. His election was the result of a hard-fought power-sharing package deal that also secured the appointment of Prime Minister Bajram Rexhepi of the Democratic Party of Kosovo (PDK) and a multi-party cabinet. The successful March vote brought an end to a three-month political deadlock, during which three secret-ballot attempts in December 2001 and January 2002 had failed to produce a winner.

Under the rules of the Constitutional Framework and the Assembly's Rules of Procedure, electing a president required a two-thirds majority (80 out of 120 votes) in the first two rounds, and a simple majority in any subsequent rounds. Because the final vote was part of a negotiated coalition agreement, the Assembly utilized an open ballot system to approve the entire government package simultaneously.

== Background ==
=== The UNMIK administration and the absence of a presidency ===
Following the end of the Kosovo War and the signing of the Kumanovo Agreement June 1999, the United Nations Security Council adopted Resolution 1244. This legally placed Kosovo under the absolute authority of the United Nations Interim Administration Mission in Kosovo (UNMIK). In this system, the Special Representative of the Secretary-General (SRSG) operated as the ultimate authority, exercising all legislative, executive, and judicial powers within the territory.

From June 1999 until late 2001, there was no official or legally recognized office of the "President of Kosovo." UNMIK governed directly through its international civil presence. Local ethnic Albanian and Serb politicians were permitted to participate only through temporary advisory bodies, such as the Kosovo Transitional Council (established in July 1999) and the Joint Interim Administrative Structure (JIAS, operational from January 2000). These bodies held no genuine decision-making power; they functioned strictly as consultative forums. The UNMIK Special Representative of the Secretary retained the right to issue sweeping regulations, appoint or dismiss officials and override any local political decisions.

=== The Constitutional Framework and President of Kosovo ===
The political system shifted significantly on 15 May 2001, when Special Representative Hans Hækkerup issued UNMIK Regulation 2001/9, commonly known as the Constitutional Framework for Provisional Self-Government in Kosovo. The purpose of this framework was not to grant independence, but to begin a gradual transfer of limited administrative responsibilities to local leaders. It officially established the Provisional Institutions of Self-Government (PISG), which included a 120-member Assembly, a Prime Minister-led Government, and the office of the President.

Crucially, the office of the President created by this Framework was deliberately designed to be weak and strictly ceremonial. The Framework explicitly stated that the President's role was merely to "represent the unity of the people" and "guarantee the democratic functioning" of the new institutions. The President possessed zero executive power, could not draft legislation, and had no authority to direct the Government.

Real executive power remained with the Special Representative of the Secretary-General (SRSG), who maintained a long list of "reserved powers" that the local institutions were not allowed to touch. These highly sensitive areas included full control over security, foreign relations, the justice system, the protection of minority rights, the police, the Kosovo Protection Corps, the budget, customs, and public property. The Framework was introduced only to begin a gradual transfer of limited responsibilities to elected Kosovo leaders ahead of future status negotiations.

Most importantly, the SRSG had the power to dissolve the Assembly and call new elections if the local institutions acted against UN Security Council Resolution 1244. Before dissolving the Assembly, the SRSG had to consult the President of Kosovo, but the final decision belonged only to the SRSG. The Assembly could ask the SRSG to dissolve itself, but the request had to go through the President.

This meant that the SRSG remained the real ruler of Kosovo, while the President was little more than a symbolic figurehead. The office was created to encourage political compromise among local parties without concentrating real power in the hands of a single local politician. The Framework was only a first, limited step toward self-government; all important decisions stayed in the hands of the international administration.

=== 2001 parliamentary elections and political deadlock ===
To populate these newly created Provisional Institutions, UNMIK and the OSCE organized the province's first post-war democratic elections on 17 November 2001. These elections determined the composition of the 120-seat Assembly of Kosovo: 100 seats were elected by proportional representation from all voters, while 20 seats were reserved for ethnic minorities (10 specifically for Serbs and 10 for other communities including Bosniaks, Turks, Roma, Ashkali and Egyptians). Voter turnout was approximately 64.3%. In practice, parties representing ethnic Albanians won a total of 85 seats, while parties and coalitions from ethnic minorities secured 35 seats.

The results produced a fragmented political landscape. Ibrahim Rugova's moderate Democratic League of Kosovo (LDK) emerged as the largest party with 45.65 % of the vote and 47 seats. The Democratic Party of Kosovo (PDK), led by former Kosovo Liberation Army political director Hashim Thaçi, won 26 seats. The Alliance for the Future of Kosovo (AAK), led by Ramush Haradinaj, secured 8 seats. The Serb "Return" (Povratak) coalition took 22 seats, while smaller parties and other minorities filled the remaining places. Because no single party held a majority — and electing a president required a two-thirds supermajority of 80 votes in the first two rounds — a broad coalition was essential.

The Assembly convened for its inaugural session on 10 December 2001 and elected Nexhat Daci (LDK) as its speaker. At that session, both the seven-member presidency of the Assembly as well as the President of Kosovo were to be elected; the latter would President nominate a Prime Minister for endorsement by the Assembly. However, the PDK did not submit candidates for the two seats of the presidency reserved for it, and the Assembly elected only its President, Mr. Nexhat Daci of the LDK and four other members; one from the LDK, two from the (Kosovo Serb) Return Coalition, and one from the United Roma Party. The meeting was then adjourned. However, deep political rivalries — especially between the pacifist-oriented LDK and the parties rooted in the former Kosovo Liberation Army (PDK and AAK) — immediately paralyzed proceedings. The session was briefly disrupted when the entire PDK delegation walked out after Hashim Thaçi was not allowed to address the chamber; the deputies returned after about 30 minutes.

The Provisional Institutions could not legally function or form a Government until a President was elected, because only the President could formally mandate a Prime Minister and cabinet. Ibrahim Rugova was the sole candidate for the presidency, but without a power-sharing agreement the opposition parties refused to support him. Three consecutive secret-ballot votes failed over the winter months, plunging the nascent institutions into a deep political crisis that lasted more than three and a half months and prevented any real governance.

== Electoral system ==
Under the Constitutional Framework for Provisional Self-Government in Kosovo (UNMIK Regulation 2001/9), the President of Kosovo was elected indirectly by the 120-member Assembly of Kosovo. A nomination for the post of President required the support of the party having the largest number of seats in the Assembly or of at least 25 members of the Assembly.

The election was conducted by secret ballot. In the first two rounds a candidate needed a two-thirds majority (80 out of 120 votes). If no candidate achieved this after the first two ballots, subsequent rounds required only a simple majority of the votes of all members of the Assembly (61 votes).

In the case of the 4 March 2002 vote, the parties agreed by consensus to use an open ballot for the entire government package (President, Prime Minister and cabinet) to ensure that no one defected from the power-sharing agreement signed on 28 February.

== Candidates ==
Ibrahim Rugova was the sole formal nominee for the presidency. As the leader of the Democratic League of Kosovo (LDK), he led the party to a plurality victory in the November 2001 elections. Prior to this election, Rugova served as a representative of the Kosovo Albanians in the Interim Administrative Council (IAC) and as the representative of the LDK in the Kosovo Transitional Council (KTC) following the 1999 conflict. His candidacy was based on the LDK's position that, as the largest political force in the Assembly, they held the legitimate right to the office of the President. Although he failed to secure the necessary votes in three secret ballots held in December 2001 and January 2002, he remained the only candidate on the ballot until the final successful vote in March 2002.

Democratic League of Kosovo
Candidate (Formal)
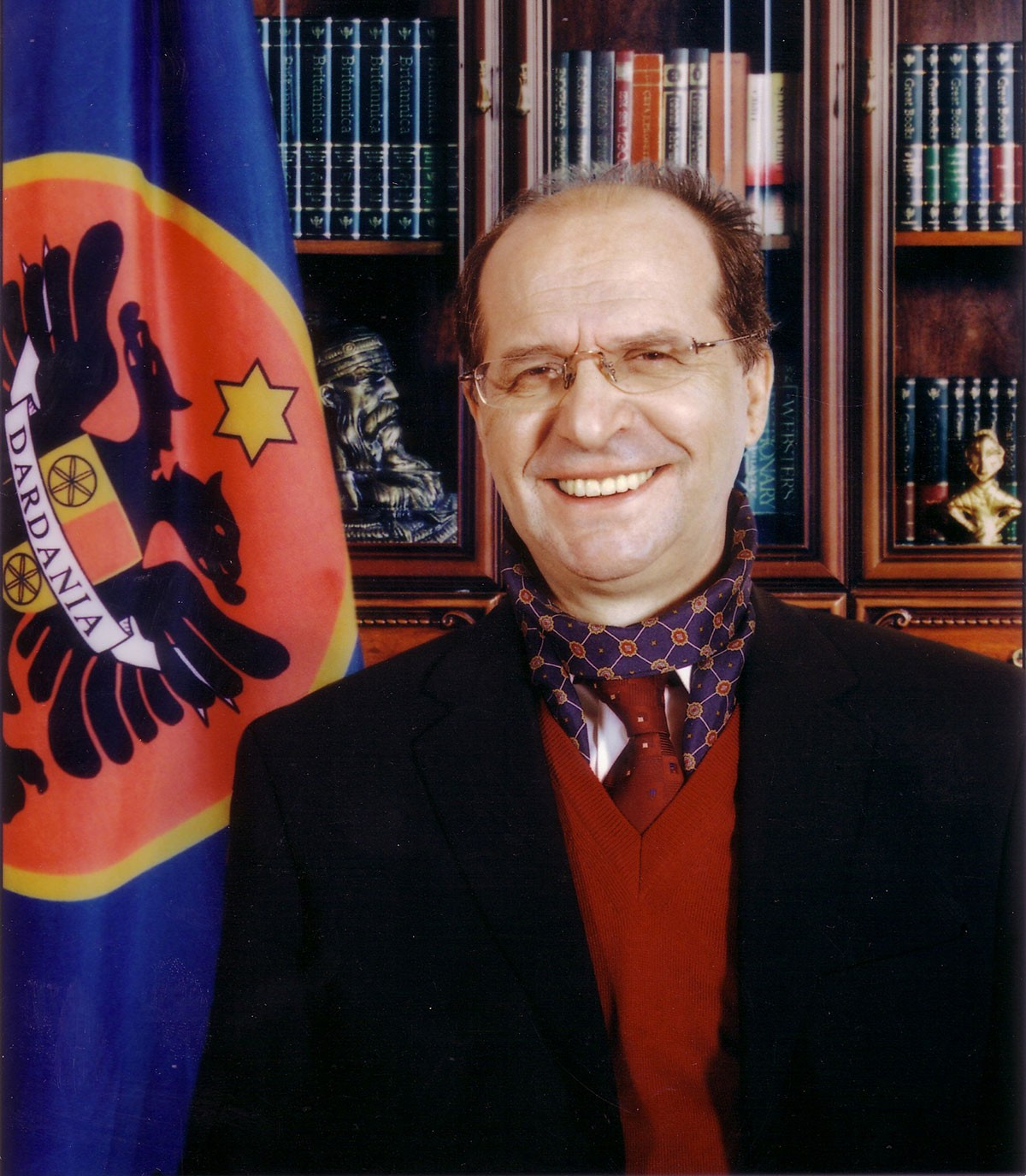
Ibrahim Rugova

=== Potential candidates ===
During the parliamentary election campaign in late 2001, the Democratic Party of Kosovo (PDK) publicly promoted Flora Brovina as its prospective candidate for the presidency. Brovina, a renowned pediatrician and human rights activist, was selected by the PDK leadership to broaden the party's appeal beyond its base of former KLA combatants and to present a more moderate, civil-oriented image to the international community and the electorate.

However, despite her prominence during the campaign, Brovina was never formally nominated in the Assembly. According to the Constitutional Framework, the PDK (holding 26 seats) had the right to nominate a candidate, but the party opted for a strategy of political leverage rather than a formal floor nomination. Her potential candidacy was ultimately withdrawn as part of the broader power-sharing negotiations brokered by SRSG Michael Steiner. In the final agreement signed on 28 February 2002, the PDK agreed not to contest the presidency in exchange for the executive post of Prime Minister of Kosovo, which was granted to Bajram Rexhepi, and several key ministerial portfolios. Brovina was instead elected as a member of the seven-member Presidency of the Assembly.

== Failed attempts to elect a president (December 2001 – January 2002) ==
Despite being the only candidate on the ballot, Ibrahim Rugova failed to secure enough votes in three consecutive rounds of voting across December 2001 and January 2002. The failure was caused by deep political rivalries. Leaders of the PDK and AAK boycotted the voting process to prevent Rugova from taking power without a formalized coalition agreement. Furthermore, deputies from the Serbian Povratak coalition, while present in the hall, cast invalid ballots as a form of protest against the establishment of the presidency.

Official Assembly transcripts show that while 118 out of 120 deputies were physically present during the sessions, dozens refused to pick up their ballots.

On 10 December 2001, in the first ballot, only 70 deputies cast votes because the PDK and AAK delegations boycotted the session entirely, while 21 Serb deputies from the Povratak coalition invalidated their ballots. Rugova received 49 votes, falling drastically short of the required 80, while 21 ballots were declared technically invalid.

A month later, on 10 January 2002, Assembly President Nexhat Daci convened the second and third ballots. In both of these rounds, exactly 80 deputies participated in the vote out of the 118 present. In the second round, Rugova obtained 50 votes, with 26 invalid ballots and 4 abstentions. In the third round, where the threshold was lowered to a simple majority of 61 votes, Rugova still failed, securing only 51 votes against 27 invalid ballots and 2 abstentions.

Summary of failed secret-ballot attempts to elect the President (Total seats: 120)
Date	Round	Present in hall (of 120)		Participated in voting (of 120)		Votes for Rugova (of votes cast)		Abstentions (of votes cast)		Invalid ballots (of votes cast)		Required majority	Result
Date	Round	Count	%	Count	%	Count	%	Count	%	Count	%	Required majority	Result
10 December 2001	1st ballot	118	98.3%	70	58.3%	49	70.0%	0	0.0%	21	30.0%	80 (2/3 of 120)	✗ Fail
10 January 2002	2nd ballot	118	98.3%	80	66.7%	50	62.5%	4	5.0%	26	32.5%	80 (2/3 of 120)	✗ Fail
10 January 2002	3rd ballot	118	98.3%	80	66.7%	51	63.8%	2	2.5%	27	33.7%	61 (Simple majority)	✗ Fail

After the failure on 10 January 2002, Assembly President Nexhat Daci adjourned the session and stated he would later inform members of a new date for the next meeting. No fixed earlier date for the election had been publicly scheduled; the process remained blocked by the lack of a power-sharing agreement, leaving Kosovo in an institutional vacuum.

== Election on 4 March 2002 ==
The deadlock lasted for over three months, was finally broken through intense international mediation. The newly appointed Special Representative, Michael Steiner, engaged in heavy shuttle diplomacy to force the major Albanian parties to the negotiating table. On 28 February 2002, after five hours of tense negotiations, Rugova, Thaçi, and Haradinaj signed a comprehensive power-sharing agreement.

This "package deal" allocated the President function to Rugova, while giving the executive post of Prime Minister to Bajram Rexhepi of the PDK. Ministerial portfolios were heavily divided among the LDK, PDK, and AAK, with specific posts legally reserved for Kosovo Serb representatives to ensure a multi-ethnic government. The agreement also named the 10-ministers multi-party cabinet. 10 ministerial portfolios as follows: LDK received four ministries, PDK two (plus the premiership), AAK two, one reserved for the Serb Coalition Povratak, and one for a non-Serb minority representative.

On 4 March 2002, the Assembly reconvened. The session was a continuation of the inaugural sitting held on 10 December 2001 and was chaired by Assembly President Nexhat Daci (LDK). Daci's first act was to accept the endorsement of two PDK members – Xhavit Haliti and Hydayet Hyseni – to the Assembly Presidency. Coalition Povratak representative Gojko Savić raised a procedural objection to the open-ballot package vote, but the Assembly voted to proceed nonetheless.

To guarantee that no political party would defect from the signed agreement in secret, the Assembly agreed to bypass the standard secret ballot. Instead, an open ballot was held on the entire government package simultaneously (President, Prime Minister and cabinet).

=== Results ===
Of the 120 registered Assembly members, 112 were present for the session. The coalition package passed easily, officially cementing Ibrahim Rugova as the first legally recognized President of Kosovo under international administration.

Results of the 2002 Kosovan presidential election
Candidate	Party	Votes	%
Ibrahim Rugova	LDK	88	78.63%
Against		3	2.7%
Abstentions		15	13.4%
Total ballots cast		106	94.6%
Members present		112	93.3%
Registered members of the Assembly		120	100%

== Aftermath ==
Immediately following the successful vote, Ibrahim Rugova was sworn into office. In his brief inaugural address, he emphasized peace, tolerance, and Kosovo's future integration into Europe. SRSG Michael Steiner and UN Secretary-General Kofi Annan widely praised the outcome, noting that the political actors had finally demonstrated the "spirit of compromise" necessary for self-governance.

The successful election of the President on 4 March 2002 was the final step required to complete the Provisional Institutions of Self-Government. With the Assembly, Government, and President formally in place, the PISG was finally able to begin its mandate of managing domestic affairs such as education, healthcare, and local infrastructure, albeit under the strict and continued oversight of UNMIK.

Although the Constitutional Framework provided for a three-year term, the President was elected by each new Assembly following parliamentary elections. After the October 2004 parliamentary elections, the newly constituted Assembly re-elected Rugova as President on 3 December 2004 during its inaugural session. He served as President until he died in office in January 2006.

=== International reactions ===
The election drew immediate positive reactions from the international community.

- UN: Special Representative Michael Steiner hailed the outcome as "a good day for Kosovo" and praised the new leadership: "These are men who will work for the interests of Kosovo, and I think they are united in bringing Kosovo forward... this is a great team for the future of Kosovo." UN Secretary-General Kofi Annan "wholeheartedly welcomed the Agreement" and urged the parties to "establish a government now".
- United States: John K. Menzies, head of the U.S. Office in Pristina, stated: "This morning, Kosovo passed a crucial test of democracy."

== Sources ==
- UN News – Kosovo Assembly elects President, Prime Minister (4 March 2002)
- Voice of America – Kosovo Elects First Ethnic Albanian President (4 March 2002)
- BBC News – Kosovo elects first president (4 March 2002)
- UN News – Voting for Kosovo President inconclusive (10 January 2002)
- UN News – Kosovo Assembly fails to elect President (13 December 2001)
- RFE/RL – Kosovo: Rugova Again Fails To Be Elected President (10 January 2002)
- Report of the Secretary-General on the United Nations Interim Administration Mission in Kosovo (S/2002/62)
- Constitutional Framework for Provisional Self-Government in Kosovo (UNMIK Regulation 2001/9)
