= Negroc =

Negroc Negrovce
- Village
- Location in Kosovo
- Location: Kosovo
- District: Pristina
- Municipality: Glogovac

Population (2024)
  - Total: 960
- Time zone: UTC+1 (CET)
  - Summer (DST): UTC+2 (CEST)

Negroc (in Albanian) or Negrovce (Serbian Cyrillic: Негровце) is a village in the Glogovac municipality of Kosovo.

== Notable people ==
- Jakup Krasniqi, Politician and former acting President of Kosovo.
