= Mehmet Kraja =

Albanian writer, literary critic and journalist

- Born: 1952 (age 73–74); Kostanjica, Montenegro
- Occupation: writer

Mehmet Kraja (born June 27, 1952) is an Albanian writer, literary critic and journalist. He is the former president of the Academy of Sciences and Arts of Kosovo.

He was born on 27 June 1952, in Kostanjica (Kështenjë) in Bar Municipality (Kraja region) in present-day Montenegro. He studied Albanian language and literature at the University of Pristina. In 1992–1999, he lived in Tirana as representative of the then unrecognized internationally government of Kosovo and as editor of the newspaper Rilindja. He has written twelve novels, four collections of short stories, ten theatrical plays and five non-fiction works.

He was president of the Academy of Sciencies until he was succeeded on 19 December 2025 by Justina Shiroka Pula.
