= 2011 Kosovan presidential elections =

February 2011 Kosovan presidential election
- 22 February 2011

120 members of the Assembly of the Republic of Kosovo 80 (1st & 2nd rounds) or 61 (3rd round) electoral votes needed to win
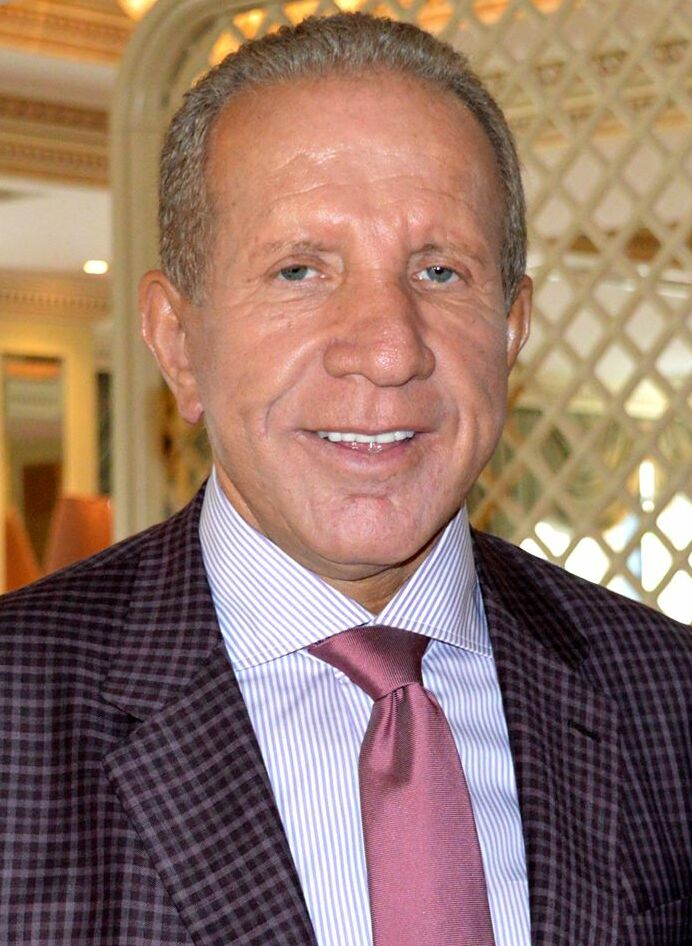
Nominee	Behgjet Pacolli
Party	New Kosovo Alliance
Electoral vote	54, 58, 62
Percentage	51.67%
President before election
Fatmir Sejdiu
Democratic League of Kosovo
President-designate
Behgjet Pacolli
New Kosovo Alliance

Indirect presidential elections were held in Kosovo on 22 February 2011 and 7 April 2011.

== Background ==
As stipulated in the coalition agreement between the Democratic Party of Kosovo (PDK) and the New Kosovo Alliance (AKR), the AKR's leader Behgjet Pacolli was to be elected president by the coalition's MPs. However, not all members of the PDK were in favour of this.

== Election ==
=== First vote ===
It took three rounds of voting for Pacolli to be elected; he got 54, 58 and 62 votes respectively. Only 67 MPs were present, with the 53 opposition MPs boycotting the election.

==== Resignation of Pacolli ====
The election was declared unconstitutional by the Constitutional Court on 28 March 2011 with a vote of 7 to 2, as the necessary quorum had not been reached in the first two rounds. Pacolli resigned on 30 March 2011 and was again replaced as Acting President by Jakup Krasniqi, the Assembly's speaker.

=== Second vote ===
April 2011 Kosovan presidential election
- 7 April

120 members of the Assembly of the Republic of Kosovo 80 (1st & 2nd rounds) or 61 (3rd round) electoral votes needed to win
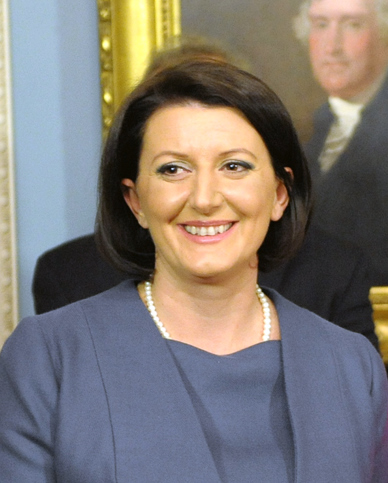

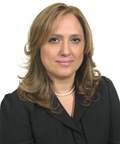
Nominee	Atifete Jahjaga	Suzan Novoberdali
Party	Independent	AKR
Electoral vote	80	10
Percentage	66.7%	8.33%
President before election
Behgjet Pacolli
New Kosovo Alliance
President-designate
Atifete Jahjaga
Independent

In a second vote on April 7, the PDK, AKR, and the opposition Democratic League of Kosovo agreed on a compromise candidate: police commander Atifete Jahjaga. She was elected with 80 votes of the 100 MPs present.

It was also agreed that she would only serve on an interim basis, with a direct presidential election planned for 2012 after the necessary constitutional changes have passed. The Constitutional Court however, ruled against shortening the term of the sitting president. and Jahjaga sat for the full term of five years.

A decision was also made to hold early parliamentary elections in early 2013, which was later held in 2014.
