= Kolë Berisha =

Albanian politician (1947–2021)

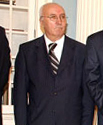
- Berisha with Kosovo Unity Team in 2007

Chairman of the Assembly
- In office 10 March 2006 – 12 December 2007
- Preceded by: Hans Hækkerup (Acting); Nexhat Daci
- Succeeded by: Jakup Krasniqi

Personal details
- Born: 26 October 1947; Klina, Yugoslavia (today Kosovo)
- Died: 29 August 2021 (aged 73); Pristina, Kosovo
- Political party: Democratic League of Kosovo
- Children: 2
- Occupation: Politician

Kolë Berisha (Serbo-Croatian: Kola Beriša; 26 October 1947 – 29 August 2021) was a politician who served as the Chair of Assembly of Kosovo from March 2006 to 2007. Berisha was also a deputy leader of the Democratic League of Kosovo. He had entered the political scene after a successful career in education in Klina, his hometown.

He had a law degree from the University of Pristina.

Berisha also wrote poetry. In 1983, in the literary competition of Podgorica's literary magazine "Time", he won the second reward for the story "Rrëfimi i thjeshtë". He also wrote articles on politics and published 2 books: "Ditari i një izolanti" and "Kosova plagë që pikon". Kolë Berisha was married and had two children. He died in August 2021 at the age of 73.
