= 2016 Kosovan presidential election =

- 26 February 2016
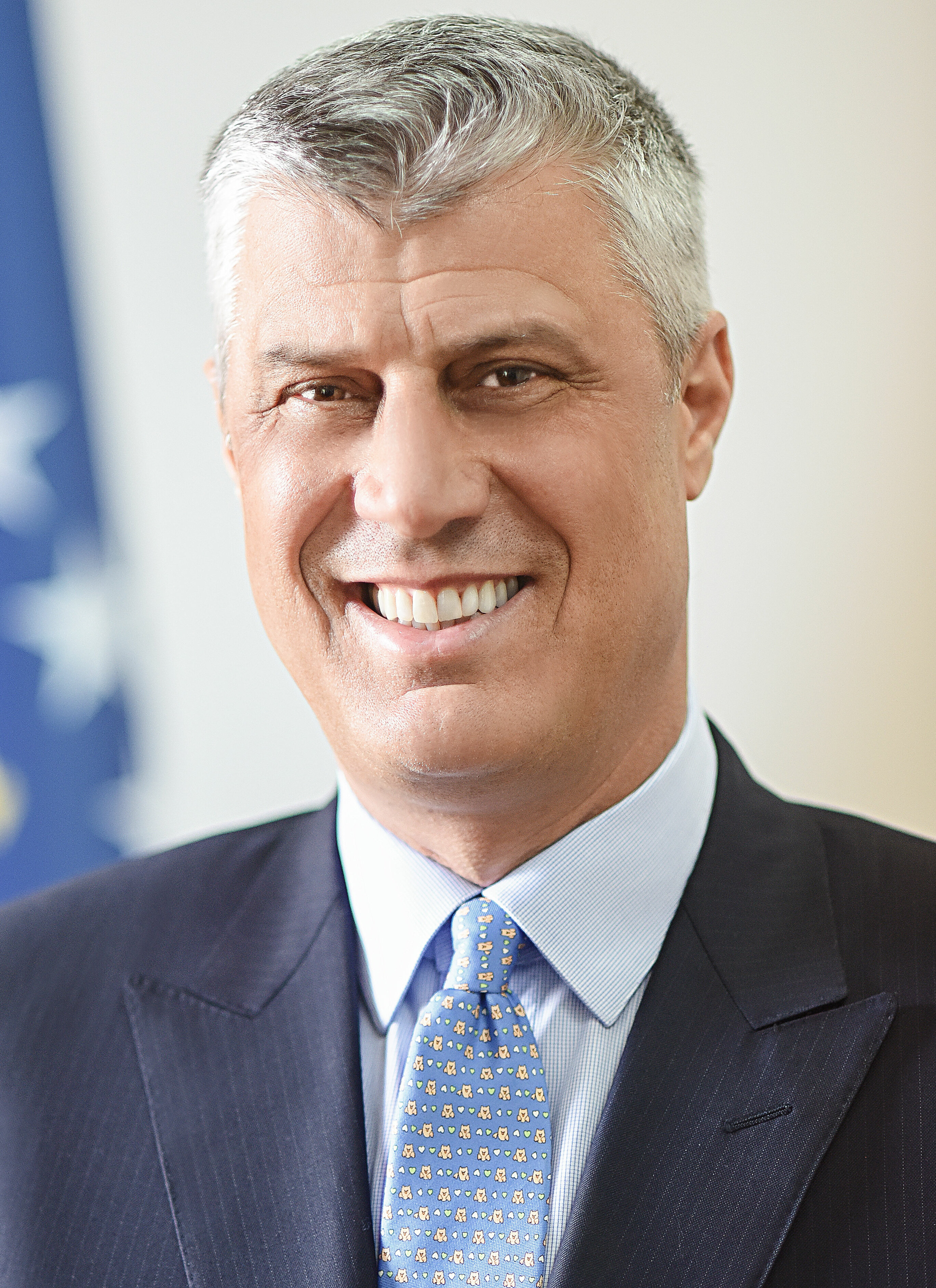

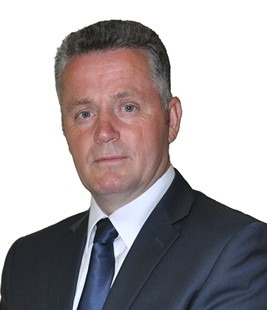
| Nominee | Hashim Thaçi | Rafet Rama |
| Party | PDK | PDK |
| Electoral vote | 50, 64, 71 | 4, 2, 0 |
President before election
Atifete Jahjaga
Independent
Elected President
Hashim Thaçi
PDK

Presidential elections were held in Kosovo on 26 February 2016. They had originally been planned for 2013 following constitutional changes expected to be passed after the compromise reached after the indirect 2011 election. However, on 6 July 2012, the Constitutional Court ruled that the presidential term could not be cut short in this way.

Former prime minister Hashim Thaçi was elected after a third round of voting, defeating Rafet Rama.

== Electoral system ==
In order to be elected, a candidate was required to receive at least 80 votes in the first two rounds of voting, equivalent to two-thirds of the 120 members of the Assembly. In the third round, the requirement was reduced to a simple majority of 60 votes.

== Results ==
| Candidate | Party | First round | | Second round | | Third round | |
| Candidate | Party | Votes | % | Votes | % | Votes | % |
|---|---|---|---|---|---|---|---|
| Hashim Thaçi | Democratic Party | 50 | 92.59 | 64 | 96.97 | 71 | 100.00 |
| Rafet Rama | Democratic Party | 4 | 7.41 | 2 | 3.03 | 0 | 0.00 |
| Total | | 54 | 100.00 | 66 | 100.00 | 71 | 100.00 |
| Valid votes | | 54 | 66.67 | 66 | 81.48 | 71 | 87.65 |
| Invalid/blank votes | | 27 | 33.33 | 15 | 18.52 | 10 | 12.35 |
| Total votes | | 81 | 100.00 | 81 | 100.00 | 81 | 100.00 |
| Registered voters/turnout | | 120 | 67.50 | 120 | 67.50 | 120 | 67.50 |
Source: Albeu, Balkan Insight
