= Speaker of the Assembly of Kosovo =

Presiding officer of the Assembly of the Republic of Kosovo

- Kryetari i Kuvendit të Kosovës
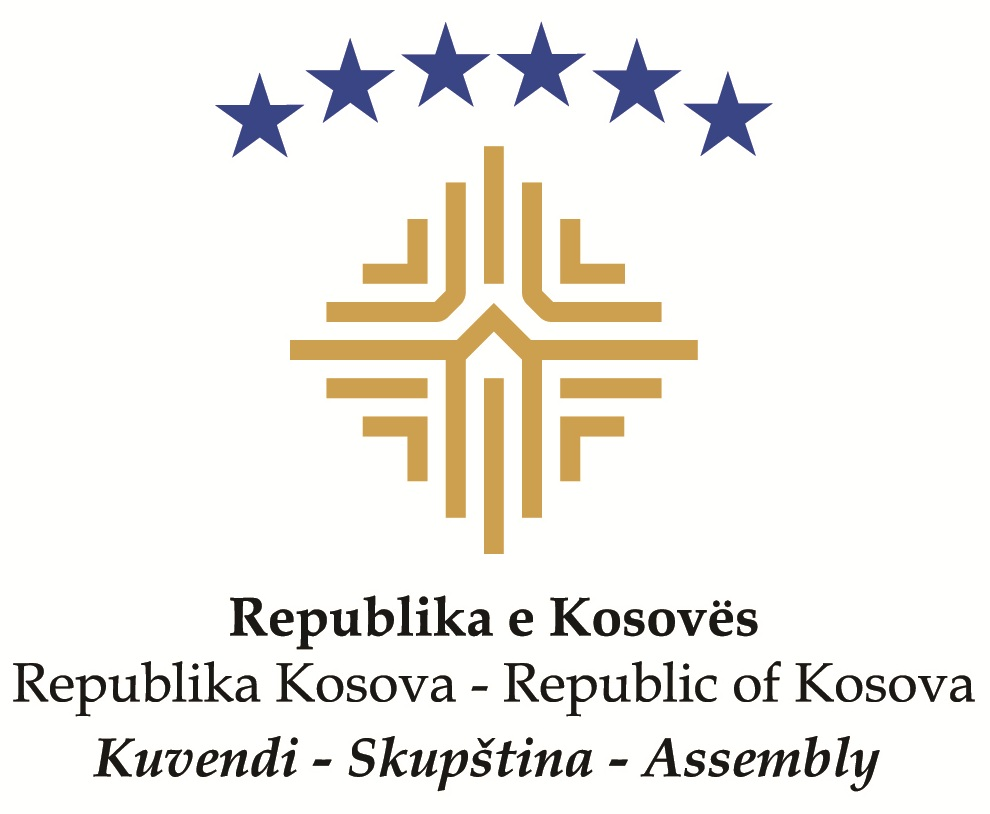
- Logo of the Assembly

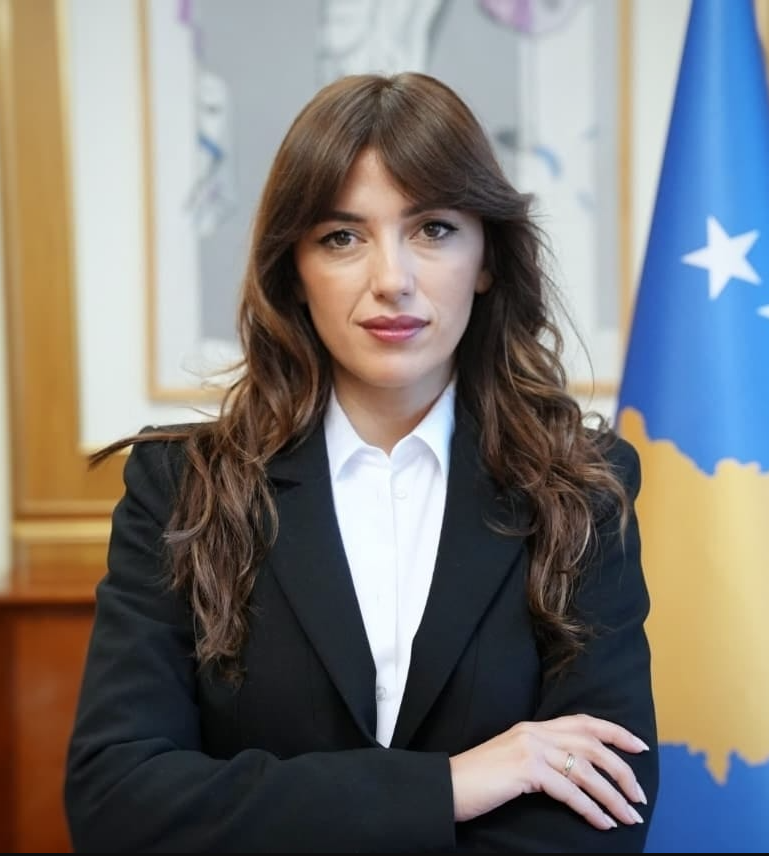
- Incumbent; Albulena Haxhiu since 9 September 2026
- Assembly of the Republic of Kosovo
- Type: Presiding officer
- Seat: Assembly Building, Pristina
- Nominator: The party that has the majority in parliament
- Appointer: Assembly; elected at the start of each legislature and upon a vacancy
- Term length: Duration of the legislature
- Constituting instrument: Constitution of Kosovo
- Inaugural holder: De jure: Bujar Gjurgjeala (acting) and Ilaz Ramajli; De facto: Hans Hækkerup (acting) and Nexhat Daci
- Formation: 2 July 1990 (de jure) (Note: The date of establishment coincides with the date of the assembly first session.); 10 December 2001 (de facto)
- Deputy: Deputy Speakers
- Website: in Albanian in Serbian in English

The Speaker of the Assembly of Kosovo (Albanian: Kryetari i Kuvendit të Kosovës, (Note: Literally translated as President of the Assembly of Kosovo.) or Kryeparlamentari i Kosovës, (Note: Literally translated as Speaker of the Parliament of Kosovo.) Serbian: Председник Скупштине Косова, romanized: Predsednik Skupštine Kosova) is the presiding officer of the Assembly of the Republic of Kosovo, elected by the parliament during the opening session. The position also ranks first in the presidential line of succession.

== History ==
The office of the Speaker of the Assembly of Kosovo was formally established on 10 December 2001. Before this date, Kosovo did not have an elected legislative body, and all executive and legislative powers were held by the United Nations Interim Administration Mission in Kosovo (UNMIK) and its head, the Special Representative of the Secretary-General (SRSG).

The newly elected Assembly held its first constitutive session in Pristina on 10 December 2001. Because the Assembly did not yet have its own rules of procedure, SRSG Hans Hækkerup served as the temporary Speaker and Chairperson. He officially opened the session, verified the mandates of the 120 elected deputies, administered their oaths of office, and legally established the legislature. Only after these procedural steps did the deputies elect their first permanent President of the Assembly: Nexhat Daci of the Democratic League of Kosovo (LDK).

Between 2001 and 2008, the President of the Assembly operated under the UNMIK Constitutional Framework. During this period, the position was important but its real powers were limited. The Assembly could only pass laws in specific administrative areas, while key sectors like security, justice, and foreign affairs remained under the direct control of the SRSG, who could also veto laws or dissolve the Assembly if necessary. However, the President of the Assembly did hold one major sovereign responsibility: serving as the acting President of Kosovo if the head of state died, resigned, or became incapacitated. This occurred in January 2006, when Nexhat Daci served as acting President following the death of Ibrahim Rugova.

The role changed significantly on 17 February 2008, when the Assembly declared independence. With the adoption of the Constitution of Kosovo later that year, UNMIK's supreme authority ended. The Assembly became the highest, fully sovereign legislative body of the new republic, transforming the President of the Assembly from a partially ceremonial role under international administration into one of the central state institutions.

== Duties and responsibilities ==
Today, the President of the Assembly is a key democratic figure in the Republic of Kosovo. According to the Constitution (Article 67) and the Assembly's Rules of Procedure, the President is responsible for leading the legislative branch, ensuring the democratic process, and representing the institution both domestically and internationally.

The core duties and powers of the President of the Assembly include:

- Representing the Assembly: Acting as the primary voice and official representative of the legislature in relations with other state institutions and foreign dignitaries.
- Managing sessions: Convening and chairing the plenary sessions of the Assembly, maintaining parliamentary order, and presiding over the meetings of the Presidency of the Assembly.
- Setting the agenda: Determining the legislative work program and proposing the agenda for parliamentary sessions, in coordination with the Assembly's Presidency.
- Signing legislation: Formally signing all laws, resolutions, and decisions adopted by the deputies before they are forwarded to the President of Kosovo for official promulgation.
- Presidential succession: Serving as the acting President of Kosovo for a period of up to six months in the event that the sitting President is temporarily unable to fulfill their duties, resigns, or is dismissed.

Through these powers, the President of the Assembly plays a critical role in maintaining the separation of powers, ensuring transparent lawmaking, and guaranteeing institutional stability in the country.

== Officeholders ==
=== Speaker ===
| No. | Portrait | Name (Birth–Death) | Term of office | | | Political party |
| No. | Portrait | Name (Birth–Death) | Took office | Left office | Time in office | Political party |
Republic of Kosova
| Act. | | Bujar Gjurgjeala (1946–2018) | 2 July 1990 | 7 September 1990 | 67 days | Independent |
| 1 | | Ilaz Ramajli (born 1951) | 7 September 1990 | 25 May 1999 | 8 years, 260 days | Democratic League |
UN-administered Kosovo
| 2 | | Nexhat Daci (1944–2026) | 10 December 2001 | 10 March 2006 | 4 years, 90 days | Democratic League |
| 3 | | Kolë Berisha (1947–2021) | 10 March 2006 | 12 December 2007 | 1 year, 277 days | Democratic League |
| 4 | | Jakup Krasniqi (born 1951) | 12 December 2007 | 17 February 2008 | 68 days | Democratic Party |
Republic of Kosovo
| (4) | | Jakup Krasniqi (born 1951) | 17 February 2008 | 17 July 2014 | 6 years, 150 days | Democratic Party (until 2014) |
| (4) | | Jakup Krasniqi (born 1951) | 17 February 2008 | 17 July 2014 | 6 years, 150 days | Social Democratic Initiative (from 2014) |
| 5 | | Kadri Veseli (born 1966) | 8 December 2014 | 3 August 2017 | 2 years, 238 days | Democratic Party |
| 5 | | Kadri Veseli (born 1966) | 7 September 2017 | 26 December 2019 | 2 years, 110 days | Democratic Party |
| 6 | | Glauk Konjufca (born 1981) | 26 December 2019 | 3 February 2020 | 39 days | Vetëvendosje |
| 7 | | Vjosa Osmani (born 1982) | 3 February 2020 | 22 March 2021 | 1 year, 47 days | Democratic League (until 2020) |
| (7) | | Vjosa Osmani (born 1982) | 3 February 2020 | 22 March 2021 | 1 year, 47 days | Guxo (from 2020) |
| (6) | | Glauk Konjufca (born 1981) | 22 March 2021 | 15 April 2025 | 4 years, 24 days | Vetëvendosje |
| 8 | | Dimal Basha (born 1979) | 26 August 2025 | 11 February 2026 | 169 days | Vetëvendosje |
| 9 | | Albulena Haxhiu (born 1987) | 11 February 2026 | 6 August 2026 | 176 days | Vetëvendosje |
| 9 | | Albulena Haxhiu (born 1987) | 9 September 2026 | Incumbent | 50 days | Vetëvendosje |

=== Chairperson of the Constitutive Session ===
Chairperson of the Constitutive Session of the Assembly of Kosovo (Albanian: Kryesuesi i seancës konstituive të Kuvendit të Kosovës, Serbian: Председавајући конститутивне седнице Скупштине Косова, romanized: Predsedavajući konstitutivne sednice Skupštine Kosova) is the temporary presiding officer of the inaugural session of a newly elected Assembly of Kosovo.

Traditionally, the oldest elected member presides, assisted by the youngest member. The role is largely ceremonial and symbolic, representing continuity and renewal in the democratic process. During the session, the mandates of elected members are verified, oaths of office are taken, and the legislature is officially constituted. The chairperson and deputy serve only until the permanent Speaker of the Assembly and deputy speakers are elected.

The practice developed after the creation of the Assembly under UNMIK in 2001. The first elections were held on 17 November 2001, and the constitutive session of 10 December 2001 was initially chaired by the UNMIK Special Representative of the Secretary-General, Hans Hækkerup, acting as temporary chairman. The Assembly subsequently elected its permanent leadership, with Nexhat Daci becoming the first Speaker.

In the second legislature, the constitutive session of 3 December 2004 was chaired by the oldest elected member, academician Mark Krasniqi, assisted by Nekibe Kelmendi. At that time, the Rules of Procedure did not yet require the youngest member to serve as deputy. By the constitutive session of 4 January 2008, Mark Krasniqi was again the oldest member and chaired the session, assisted by the youngest elected member, Njomza Emini. The "oldest + youngest" formula subsequently became the established practice.

Following Kosovo’s declaration of independence and the adoption of the Constitution of Kosovo in 2008, the practice was formalized in the Rules of Procedure. The oldest member chairs the inaugural session and is assisted by the youngest elected member until the permanent leadership is elected.

The role remains essential for ensuring constitutional and procedural legitimacy at the start of each legislative term, especially during periods of political deadlock when the election of the permanent Speaker can take weeks or months.

Political parties: PDK LDK Vetëvendosje KDTP SLS Independent

| Chairperson (Born-Died) Age during the Constitutive Session | Deputy chairperson (Born-Died) Age during the Constitutive Session | Term of office | | |
| Chairperson (Born-Died) Age during the Constitutive Session | Deputy chairperson (Born-Died) Age during the Constitutive Session | Took office | Left office | Time in office |
UN-administered Kosovo
| Hans Hækkerup (1945–2013); 56 years old | none (Note: Under UNMIK Regulation No. 2001/9, the SRSG exercised supreme executive authority in Kosovo. Following the first elections of 17 November 2001, Hans Hækkerup, as SRSG and highest international administrator, chaired the constitutive session of the Assembly of Kosovo on 10 December 2001. As the Assembly had not yet adopted its own Rules of Procedure and the practice of the oldest member assisted by the youngest had not yet been established, Hækkerup opened the session, verified the mandates, administered the oaths of office, and oversaw the election of the permanent leadership, with Nexhat Daci becoming the first Speaker. Hækkerup then handed over the chair to the elected Speaker, with no deputy chairperson present.) | 10 December 2001 | | 0 days |
| Mark Krasniqi (1920–2015); 84 years old | Nekibe Kelmendi (1944–2011); 60 years old (Note: Assisted; not the youngest member – UNMIK-era practice did not require the youngest deputy.) | 3 December 2004 | | 0 days |
| Mark Krasniqi (1920–2015); 87 years old | Njomza Emini (born 1983); 24 years old | 4 January 2008 | | 0 days |
Republic of Kosovo
| Flora Brovina (1949–2026); 61 years old | Biserka Kostić (born 1968); 42 years old) | 21 February 2011 | | 0 days |
| Flora Brovina (1949–2026); 65 years old | Teuta Rugova (born 1990); 24 years old | 17 July 2014 | 8 December 2014 | 144 days |
| Adem Mikullovci (1937–2020); 79 years old | Teuta Rugova (born 1990); 26 years old | 3 August 2017 | 7 September 2017 | 35 days |
| Jahja Kokaj (born 1948); 71 years old | Fjolla Ujkani (born 1997); 22 years old | 26 December 2019 | | 0 days |
| Avni Dehari (born 1947); 73 years old | Adelina Grainca (born 1997); 23 years old | 22 March 2021 | | 0 days |
| Avni Dehari (born 1947); 78 years old | Sala Jashari (born 1999); 26 years old | 15 April 2025 | 26 August 2025 | 133 days |
| Avni Dehari (born 1947); 78 years old | Fatma Taçi (born 2003); 22 years old | 11 February 2026 | | 0 days |
| Avni Dehari (born 1947); 79 years old | Fatma Taçi (born 2003); 22 years old | 6 August 2026 | 9 September 2026 | 34 days |

== See also ==
- History of Kosovo
- President of the Assembly of SAP Kosovo
- Politics of Kosovo
