= Rafet Rama =

Kosovan politician

Rafet Rama (born 5 December 1971) is a Kosovan politician and lawmaker who ran for the 2016 presidential election, in which he was defeated by Hashim Thaçi. He is a member of the Democratic Party of Kosovo. In the 90s, he was a Kosovo Liberation Army commander of the brigade 114 Fehmi Lladrovci.
