= Vjosa Osmani =

President of Kosovo (2020–2021, 2021–2026)

Vjosa Osmani Sadriu
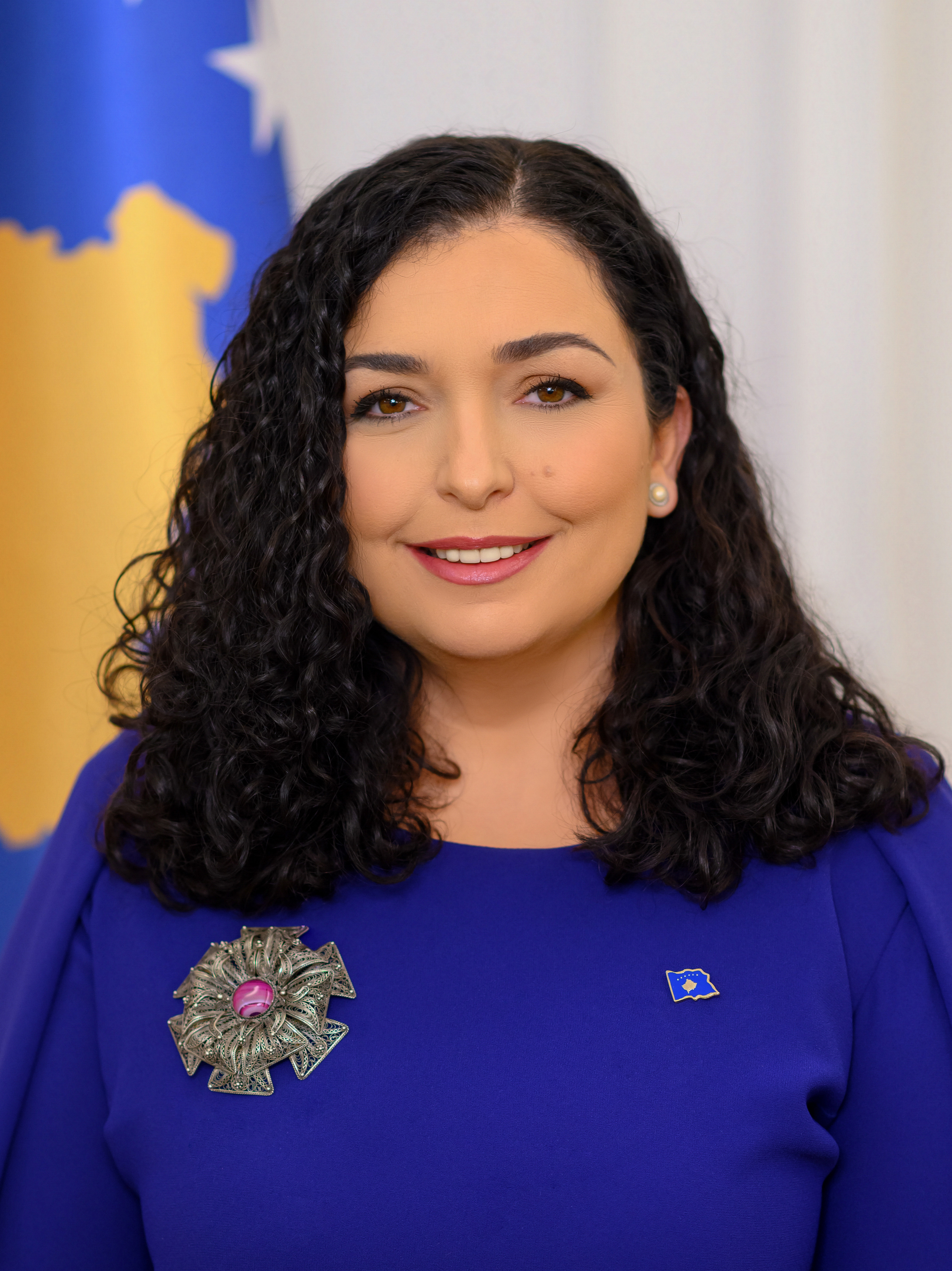
- Official portrait, 2021

President of Kosovo
- In office 4 April 2021 – 4 April 2026
- Prime Minister: Albin Kurti
- Preceded by: Glauk Konjufca (acting)
- Succeeded by: Albulena Haxhiu (acting)
- Acting; 5 November 2020 – 22 March 2021
- Prime Minister: Avdullah Hoti
- Preceded by: Hashim Thaçi
- Succeeded by: Glauk Konjufca (acting)

Speaker of the Assembly of Kosovo
- In office 3 February 2020 – 22 March 2021
- President: Hashim Thaçi
- Preceded by: Glauk Konjufca
- Succeeded by: Glauk Konjufca

Personal details
- Born: 17 May 1982 (age 44) Titova Mitrovica, SAP Kosovo, SFR Yugoslavia
- Party: Democratic League (2000s–2020, 2026–present)
- Other political affiliations: Independent (2021–2026); Guxo (2021)
- Spouse: Prindon Sadriu (m. 2012)
- Children: 2
- Education: University of Pristina (BA); University of Pittsburgh (LLM, SJD)
- Profession: Politician and legal academic

Vjosa Osmani-Sadriu (born 17 May 1982) is a Kosovar jurist and politician who served as President of Kosovo from 2021 to 2026, having previously served as acting president 2020 to 2021. She also served as Speaker of the Assembly of Kosovo from 2020 to 2021.

Born and raised in Titova Mitrovica, SFR Yugoslavia (present-day Kosovo), Osmani studied law at the University of Pristina and the University of Pittsburgh School of Law. She worked as an advisor to the president of Kosovo Fatmir Sejdiu before she was elected to the Assembly.

Osmani held the position of Speaker of the Assembly of Kosovo from February 2020 to March 2021. She became Kosovo's acting president in November 2020, following the resignation of President Hashim Thaçi. Upon her election as president to a full term in April 2021, Osmani became the second woman to hold the position, as well as the first person to have served as both acting president and president of Kosovo. Osmani successfully ran on an anti-corruption platform and has expressed a desire to normalize relations between Kosovo and Serbia.

== Early life and education ==
Vjosa Osmani was born on 17 May 1982 in Titova Mitrovica, Kosovo, then a part of the Socialist Republic of Serbia, Yugoslavia to ethnic Albanian parents. She grew up with four siblings, and completed her primary and secondary education in her hometown. Osmani was a teenager during the Kosovo War.

Osmani received a BA degree in law from the University of Pristina (Kosovo) in 2004. She then pursued graduate studies at the University of Pittsburgh School of Law, earning an LLM in 2005, followed by an SJD degree in 2015. Her doctoral dissertation addressed the applicability of the UN Convention on Contracts for the International Sale of Goods (CISG) in Kosovo as Kosovo's legal status has evolved since 1988, when the CISG first entered into force.

== Career ==
Osmani has been a teaching assistant at the University of Pristina since 2006, a lecturer at RIT Kosovo since 2010, and has been invited multiple times as a visiting professor at the University of Pittsburgh between 2009 and 2015.

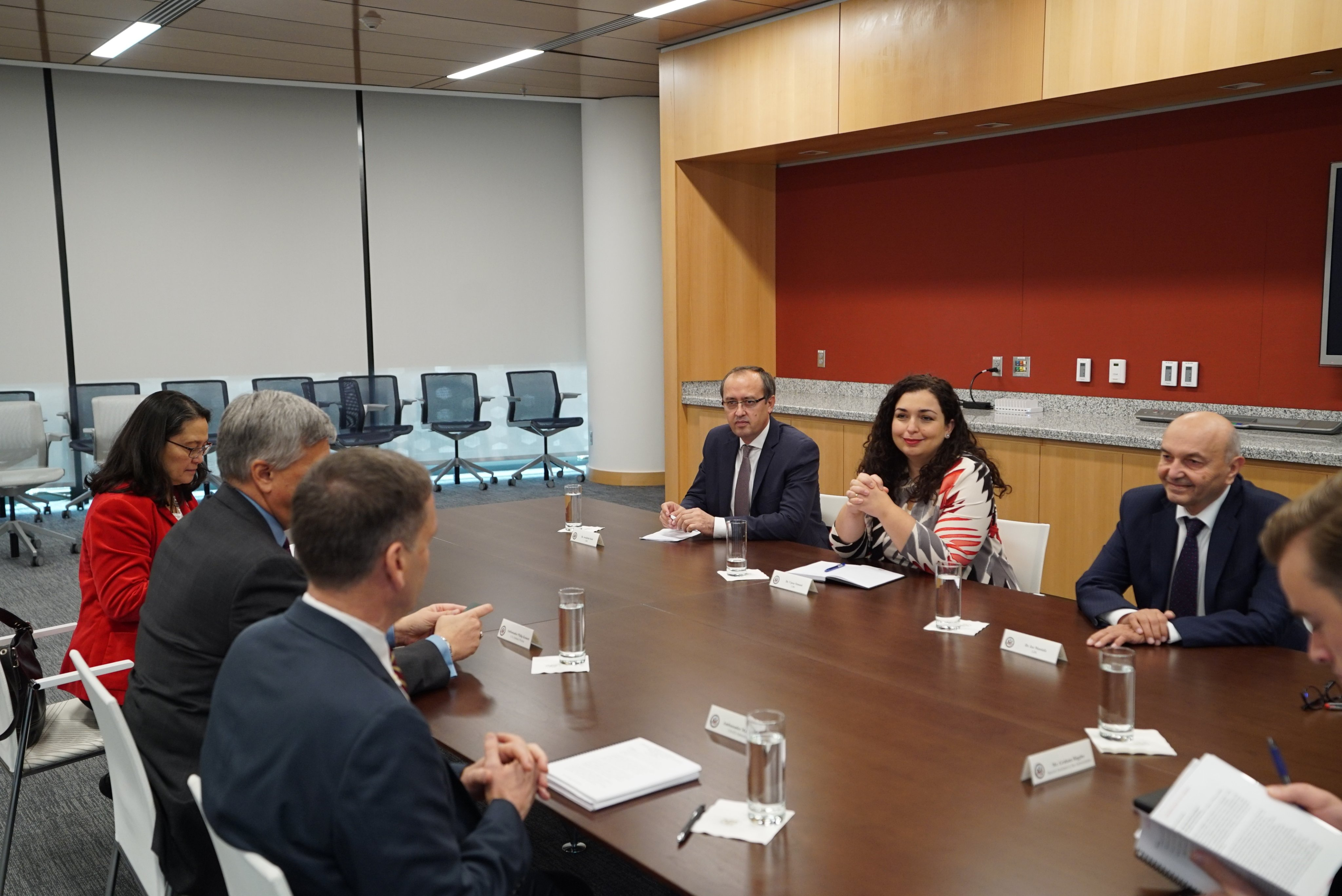
Meeting with former prime minister Isa Mustafa and U.S. Agency for International Development (USAID) Administrator Mark Green in 2019

Osmani's political career began in her teens, as an activist for the centre-right Democratic League of Kosovo (LDK). On 27 August 2009, she was elected chief of staff for then president Fatmir Sejdiu. Osmani had also served as legal counsel and foreign policy advisor to the president. She was a member of the Assembly of Kosovo for three terms, and once received the largest number of votes for a female politician in Kosovan parliamentary history. Osmani contributed to the independence of Kosovo, as the president's representative for the Constitution Commission, the body that prepared the Kosovan constitution. She represented Kosovo in a case at the International Court of Justice, where she defended the legality of Kosovo's independence.

As part of her parliamentary duties, Osmani served as the chair of the Committee on Foreign Affairs, Diaspora and Strategic Investments and the Committee on European Integration. She also served as the vice-chair of the Committee on Constitutional Reforms in Kosovo. In 2014, Osmani clashed with LDK leadership, including party leader Isa Mustafa, when she criticized the LDK for forming a coalition government with its long-time rival party, the Democratic Party of Kosovo (PDK), breaking a previously made pledge. Osmani also boycotted the presidential election in 2016, in which PDK leader Hashim Thaçi was elected president as part of the coalition agreement.

Osmani was viewed as a possible prime minister of Kosovo by the LDK in the 2019 snap parliamentary election. While campaigning for the election, she said the Kosovan people were ready for a female prime minister, and that she could fight corruption and make free market reforms for Kosovo. She lost the election to Albin Kurti, leader of the left-wing anti-establishment party Vetëvendosje, and had received 176,016 votes.

On 20 June 2020, Osmani was removed from her position as her party's deputy leader, after LDK leader Mustafa called for her dismissal due to her public opposition of decisions made by the party. Prime Minister Avdullah Hoti replaced her as LDK deputy leader. Osmani later quit the LDK altogether on 7 September 2020, stating that the party had left her no choice, but adding that she would return if the party were reformed.

=== President of Kosovo (2021–2026) ===
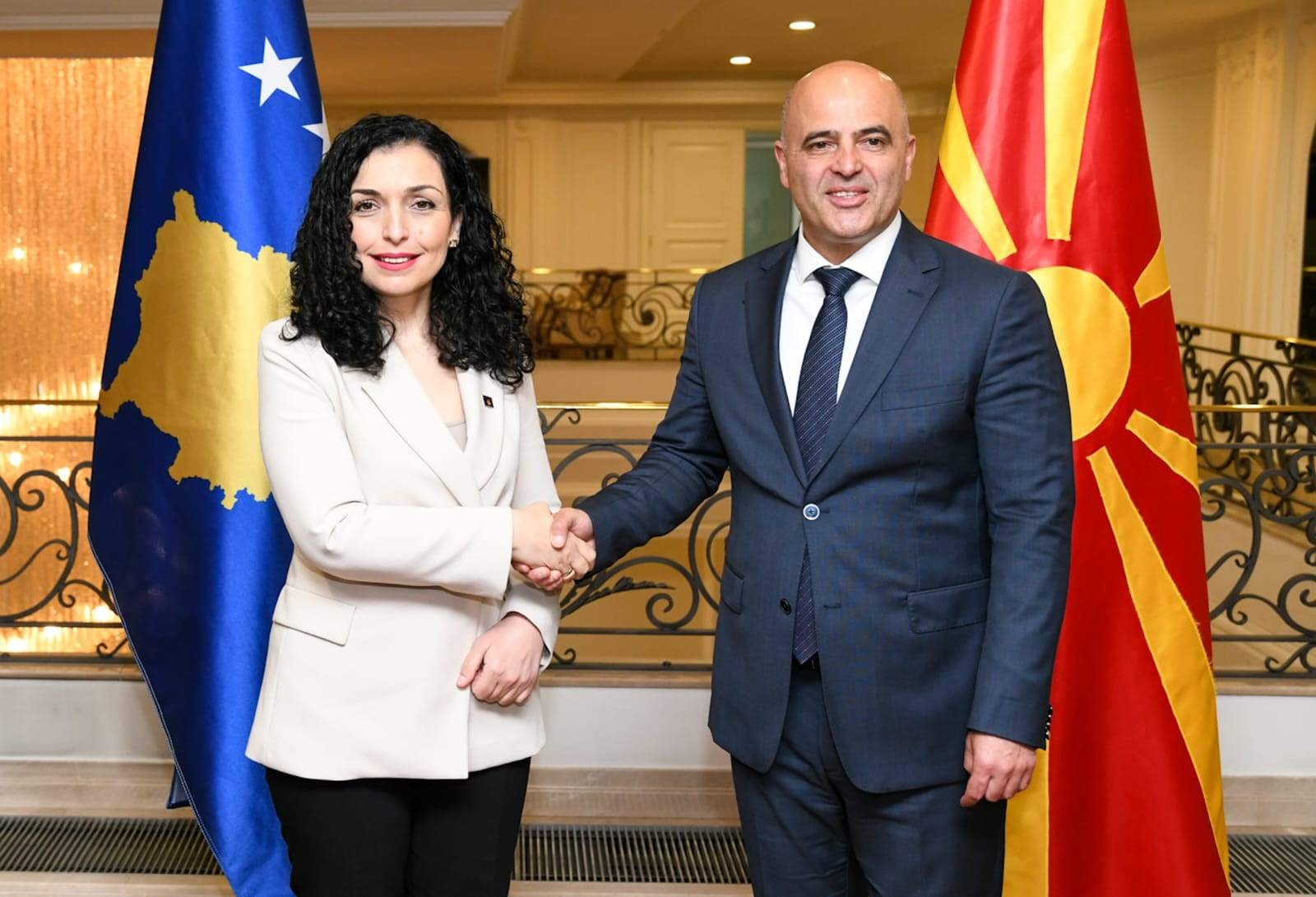
Osmani with Macedonian Prime Minister Dimitar Kovačevski in Skopje, on 26 April 2023

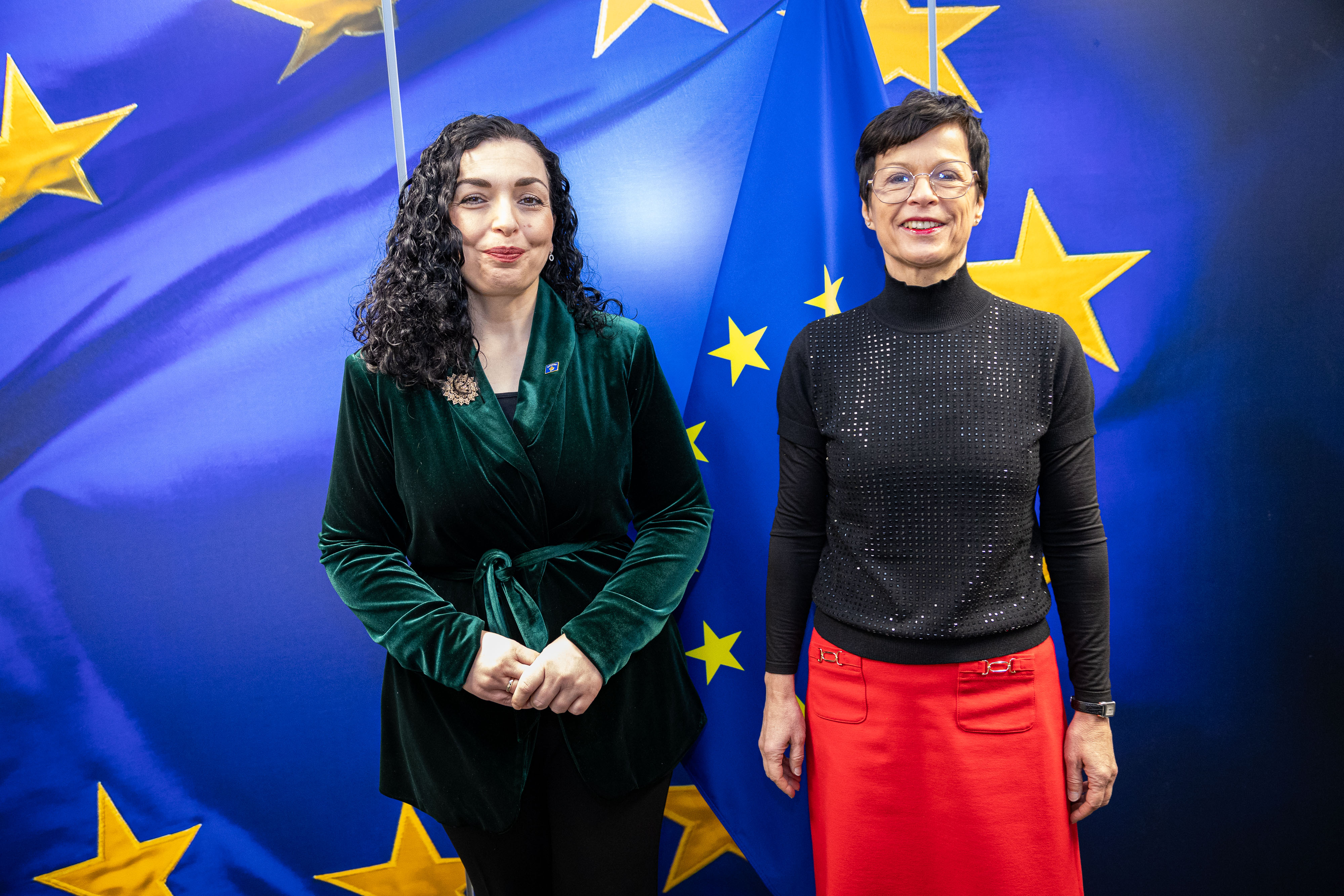
Osmani with Marta Kos in Brussels in December 2024

In 2020, Osmani was appointed acting president of Kosovo after President Thaçi resigned following an indictment by the Kosovo Specialist Chambers and Specialist Prosecutor's Office in The Hague. In preparation for the 2021 Kosovan parliamentary election, Osmani announced the founding of her own political party, Guxo, on 2 January 2021. She also aligned with Kurti's Vetëvendosje party. Running on an anti-corruption platform, both parties scored landslide victories, and Osmani personally received more than 300,000 votes. The election also gave women a third of the 120-seat parliament and an unprecedented six positions out of fifteen in the cabinet. In contrast, the LDK, Osmani's former party, did very poorly in the elections, as predicted by LDK members who had publicly criticized the earlier ouster of Osmani in 2020. The LDK lost roughly half of its seats in parliament, and party leader Mustafa resigned on 14 March. On 4 April 2021, the assembly elected Osmani as Kosovo's president during its third round of voting. Although the vote was unattended by two opposition parties as well as a party representing the ethnic Serb minority in Kosovo, 82 members of the 120-seat parliament cast their votes during the second day of the extraordinary session. (Note: Boycotting the vote were opposition parties PDK and Alliance for the Future of Kosovo (AAK), as well as Serb minority party Serb List. It was also reported that one or two members of the aforementioned parties may not have adhered to the boycott.) She won 71 of the votes, while 11 votes were declared invalid, and was subsequently sworn in for a five-year term later that day, becoming Kosovo's second female president. Osmani said that she hoped to normalize relations between Kosovo and Serbia, while also calling for Belgrade to apologize for the war that led to Kosovo's declaration of independence and to prosecute those who had committed war crimes. Before taking the oath of office, Osmani resigned from the leadership of Guxo. (Note: The Constitution of Kosovo precludes the president from acting as an official of any political party.) Newly appointed Minister of Foreign Affairs Donika Gërvalla replaced her as Guxo's head.

== Personal life ==
In 2012, Osmani married Prindon Sadriu, an employee of the Ministry of Foreign Affairs. They have twin daughters. Osmani speaks Albanian, English, Serbian, Spanish, and Turkish.

== Honours and accolades ==
During Osmani's master's studies at the University of Pittsburgh, the university presented her with the Excellence for the Future Award twice. In 2017, the University of Pittsburgh Center for International Studies awarded her the Sheth International Young Alumni Achievement Award for her contribution to democracy and human rights.

On 28 February 2022, Osmani was awarded the honorary degree of Doctor Honoris Causa (Dr.h.c.) from Ankara University. On 21 August 2024, Osmani was honored with the M100 Media Award by M100 Sanssouci Colloquium.

In October 2025, Osmani was awarded the NATO Parliamentary Assembly's Women for Peace and Security Award.

=== Foreign honours ===
- Antigua and Barbuda: Faithful and Meritorious Governor General’s Medal
- Brunei: Honorary recipient of the Family Order of Laila Utama (DK, 6 May 2025) (Note: The honour was conferred by Hassanal Bolkiah, Sultan of Brunei at his official residence Istana Nurul Iman and carries the honorific title Datin Laila Utama.)

== Notes ==
Political offices
Preceded by Glauk Konjufca	Speaker of the Assembly of Kosovo; 2020–2021	Succeeded by Avni Dehari; Acting
Preceded by Hashim Thaçi	President of Kosovo; Acting; 2020–2021	Succeeded by Glauk Konjufca; Acting
Preceded by Glauk Konjufca; Acting	President of Kosovo; 2021–2026	Succeeded by Albulena Haxhiu; Acting
Party political offices
New political party	Leader of Guxo; 2021	Succeeded by Donika Gërvalla
