= Michael Steiner =

German diplomat (born 1949)

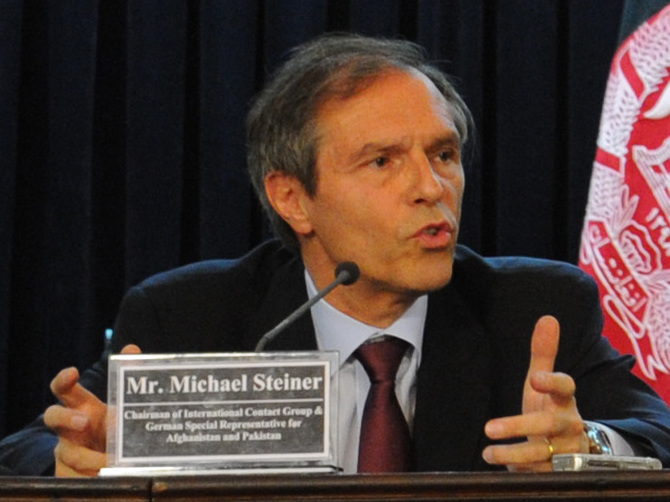
- Steiner in 2011

German Ambassador to India
- In office March 2012 – June 2015

3rd Special Representative of the Secretary-General for Kosovo
- In office 14 February 2002 – 8 July 2003
- Preceded by: Hans Hækkerup
- Succeeded by: Harri Holkeri

Personal details
- Born: 28 November 1949 (age 76) Munich, Bavaria, Germany
- Occupation: Diplomat

Michael Steiner (born 28 November 1949) is a German diplomat who served as head of the United Nations Mission in Kosovo (UNMIK). He was the German Ambassador to India from March 2012 to June 2015.

== Early life and education ==
Michael Steiner was born on 28 November 1949 in Munich, Bavaria, Germany. Steiner studied law in Paris and Munich from 1971 to 1977 and qualified as a judge in 1981.

== Career ==
In 1981, Steiner entered the German Foreign Office. As a young political officer in Prague in the summer of 1989, he won plaudits for his handling of a refugee crisis that helped lead to the fall of the Berlin Wall. As hundreds of East Germans surrounded his embassy grounds, asking for asylum and West German citizenship, he helped some of them over the wall himself, onto the embassy grounds, which were West German territory. Then he worked to negotiate a deal to allow the East Germans to leave the embassy and go to the West.

During his career with the German government, Steiner served as head of the liaison office for German humanitarian aid in Zagreb, made his mark in the 1990s working with the so-called Contact Group of nations monitoring the Yugoslav wars (of which Germany was a member), and as head of the co-ordination unit for multilateral peace efforts. He also led the special section "International Peace Efforts in Yugoslavia" from 1994 to 1995.

Steiner served nearly six months (January–July 1997) as principal deputy to Carl Bildt, the first High Representative in Sarajevo, Bosnia and Herzegovina. In 1998, while serving as Germany's ambassador in Prague, he was plucked by Chancellor Gerhard Schröder to work in the chancellor's office as his foreign and security policy adviser. And in 2001 he was forced to resign after the so-called "caviar affair".

In December 2001 he was appointed a head of the United Nations Interim Administration Mission in Kosovo by UN Secretary General, Kofi Annan. He was the third special representative of the secretary general for Kosovo since UNMIK was established in 1999. He followed Hans Haekkerup of Denmark and Bernard Kouchner of France, and was replaced by Harri Hermani Holkeri of Finland on 8 July 2003. From April 2010 to March 2012, Steiner served as Special Representative for Afghanistan and Pakistan for the German Ministry of Foreign Affairs.

In March 2012 Steiner was pronounced new ambassador of the Federal Republic of Germany to India. On 20 July 2012, he hosted a festive ceremony at his residence in the honour of Zubin Mehta to acknowledge his outstanding contribution in the field of classical music.

== Personal life ==
Michael Steiner married Eliese Steiner, an art historian. They first met at the Colosseum in Italy.

== Controversy ==
In early 2001, Steiner was criticized for apparently leaking information about sensitive talks between Chancellor Gerhard Schröder and US President George W. Bush. On 2 November 2001, he had a row with three German soldiers stationed in Moscow, when Schröder's plane was delayed for refuelling on the last day of a tour of Asia. Steiner allegedly called the soldiers "arseholes" and demanded that they served him caviar during the delay. Soon after news media reported about the incident, Steiner publicly apologized and resigned from his post.

== Lebe jetzt ==
To celebrate his retirement as German Ambassador to India, the German Embassy released a video on YouTube named Lebe jetzt. The video was a homage to popular Hindi movie Kal Ho Na Ho starring Shah Rukh Khan. Steiner played the part of Khan, his wife Eliese played the part of Preity Zinta whereas former Indian External Affairs Minister Salman Khurshid played the part essayed by Saif Ali Khan.
