= Nexhat Daci =

Kosovar politician (1944–2026)

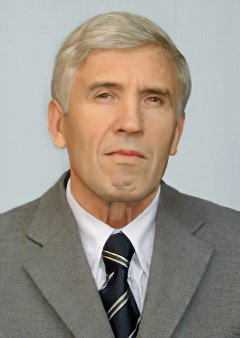

Acting President of Kosovo
- In office 21 January 2006 – 11 February 2006
- Preceded by: Ibrahim Rugova
- Succeeded by: Fatmir Sejdiu

Chairman of the Assembly
- In office 10 December 2001 – 10 March 2006
- Preceded by: Hans Hækkerup (acting)
- Succeeded by: Kolë Berisha

Personal details
- Born: 26 July 1944 Veliki Trnovac, FS Serbia, DF Yugoslavia
- Died: 1 January 2026 (aged 81) Pristina, Kosovo
- Party: LDK (1989–2006, 2015–2026); LDD (2007–2015)
- Education: University of Bradford (UK); University of Zagreb

Nexhat Daci (Note: Albanian: [neˈdʒat ˈdaːtsi]) (26 July 1944 – 1 January 2026) was a Kosovan politician who served as the speaker of the Assembly of Kosovo from 2001 to 2006. A member of President Ibrahim Rugova's Democratic League of Kosovo (LDK), he also served as acting president following Rugova's death in January 2006. In March 2006, he was ousted from the speakership due to infighting within the LDK. He also led the Democratic League of Dardania, which he founded following his unsuccessful bid to become leader of the Democratic League of Kosovo.

== Education ==
- 1962–1966: University of Belgrade, Chemistry Section, Diploma in chemistry;
- 1966–1968: University of Belgrade, Master studies, Master of Science;
- 1969–1973: University of Zagreb, studies for doctorate, PhD in chemistry;
- 1971: School of English Language, Folkestone, United Kingdom;
- 1972: After Master Studies, Liège, Belgium;
- 1973: Hydro project, Brno, Czechoslovakia;
- 1974–1975: University of Bradford, United Kingdom, after PhD Studies.

Daci spoke English, Serbo-Croatian, German (passive) as well as his native Albanian.

He was an academic and was a member of the Academy of Science and Arts of Kosovo.

== Activities and functions held ==
- 1985: American Chemical Society- Regular Member;
- 1987: European Academy for Environment, Tybigen, Germany – Regular Member;
- 1994: Academy of Sciences and Arts of Kosovo (ASAK) – Regular Member;
- Participation in Congresses, Conferences, Symposia in the US, the UK, Germany, Italy, Turkey, Hungary, Slovenia, Croatia, Serbia, Albania, Kosovo

=== Publications ===
- School Textbooks for primary and secondary school, and University – 10 in total;
- Scientific projects – 120 in total.

=== Other activities ===
- 1970–1972: Manager of the Chemistry Section in the University of Pristina;
- 1970: Professor in the University of Pristina, Faculty of Chemistry;
- 1992–2001: Member of Parliament of the Republic of Kosovo;
- 1992–2026: Member of the General Council of the Democratic League of Kosovo, since its inception;
- 1994–1998: General Secretary of the Academy of Sciences and Arts of Kosovo (ASAK);
- 1998–2002: President of the Academy of Sciences and Arts of Kosovo (ASAK);
- 2001–2006: Speaker of the Assembly of Kosovo

== Death ==
Daci died in Pristina on 1 January 2026, at the age of 81.

== Footnotes ==
Preceded by Hans Hækkerup (acting)	Chairman of the Assembly of Kosovo; 2001–2006	Succeeded by Kolë Berisha
Preceded by Ibrahim Rugova	President of Kosovo (acting); 2006	Succeeded by Fatmir Sejdiu
