= Mark Krasniqi =

Ethnographist from Kosovo (1920–2015)

- Born: 19 October 1920; Peja, Kingdom of Serbs, Croats and Slovenes (now Kosovo)
- Died: 28 August 2015 (aged 94); Pristina, Kosovo
- Occupations: Ethnographer, Publicist, Poet, Politician
- Writing career
- Notable works: Lugu i Baranit 1983; Gjurme e Gjurmie 1974

Mark Krasniqi (9 October 1920 – 28 August 2015) was a Kosovar Albanian ethnographist, publicist, writer and translator who did most of his work while residing in Yugoslavia.

== Biography ==
He was born on 19 October 1920 near Peja, in the Kingdom of Serbs, Croats and Slovenes (modern-day Kosovo). He was born to an ethnic Albanian family. He finished elementary school in Peja in the Serbian language and due to his Catholic background attended the Catholic high school in Prizren, being one of few Albanians among mostly Croatians and Slovenes, finishing in 1941. After high school, he studied literature at the University of Padua, Italy and after World War II he studied geography and ethnography at the University of Belgrade. Krasniqi was a contributor to the Rilindja newspaper since 1945 in Prizren. After writing an article related to Marie Shllaku, he was accused of overpassing the nationalistic boundaries and his scholarship got cancelled. Despite that, he graduated in 1950.

After his graduation, until the end of 1961, he worked in the Ethnographical Institute of the Serbian Academy of Sciences and Arts, being one of few ethnic Albanians to receive a membership in that Academy. Since 1961 he lectured at the University of Pristina; he was also a member of Academy of Sciences and Arts of Kosovo. Krasniqi earned his PhD in the University of Ljubljana in 1960. He published various studies and scientific books on ethnography and geography as well as textbooks. He was most widely known as a writer, especially for his poetry for children.

Krasniqi was a member of the Assembly of Kosovo during the legislatures of 2001–2004, 2004–2007, and 2007-2010 representing Albanian Christian Democratic Party of Kosovo, part of respectively LDK and LDD parliamentary groups. He has also served as President of Academy of Sciences and Arts of Kosovo, Dean at the Faculty of Law and Economics, President of Albanian Christian Democratic Party (PShDK), and First Head of the Association of Writers of Kosovo. Beside Albanian and Serbo-Croatian he was fluent in Italian.

== Publications ==
=== Scientific studies ===
- Contemporary socio-geographical changes in Kosovo and Dukagjin (Serbian: Savremene društveno-geografske promene na Kosovu i Metohiji), 1963, in Serbo-Croatian, publisher: Rilindja, Pristina, OCLC 631576938
- Trails and tracking, Ethnographic studies, 1982, publisher: Shtëpia Botuese "8 Nëntori", Tirana, OCLC 13845605
- Trough of Barani: Ethnographic monograph, 1985, publisher: Academy of Sciences and Arts of Kosovo, OCLC 23575118
- Rugova: Ethnographic monograph (as co-author), 1987, publisher: Akademija Nauka i Umetnosti Kosova, OCLC 249450825
- From the source of traditions, Ethnographic studies, 1991, publisher: Zëri, Pristina, OCLC 500189890
- Mythological aspects, beliefs and superstitions (Albanian: Aspekte milogogjike : besime e bestytni), 1997, publisher: Gazeta "Rilindja", Pristina, OCLC 796234833
- Our ethnic roots (Albanian: Rrënjët tona etnike), 2002, publisher: Albanian Christian Democratic Party of Kosovo, Pristina, OCLC 500191010
- Faith in Albanian traditions (Albanian: Besa në traditën shqiptare), 2011, publisher: Academy of Sciences and Arts of Kosovo, ISBN 9789951413992
- Hospitality in Albanian traditions (Albanian: Mikpritja në traditën shqiptare), 2005, publisher: Academy of Sciences and Arts of Kosovo, ISBN 9789951413190
- Tolerance in Albanian traditions (Albanian: Toleranca në traditën shqiptare), 2007, publisher: Academy of Sciences and Arts of Kosovo, ISBN 9789951413633
- Ethnic aspect of migrations: Albanians through violent deportations (Albanian: Aspekti etnik i migrimeve : shqiptarët në rrjedhat e shpërnguljeve të dhunshme), 2012, publisher: Academy of Sciences and Arts of Kosovo, Pristina, ISBN 9789951615020 (Hivzi Islami as co-author)
- Sami Frasheri and the pedagogy of National Awakening (Albanian: Sami Frashëri dhe pedagogjia e rilindjes kombëtare), 1995, publisher: Academy of Sciences and Arts of Kosovo, Pristina, OCLC 439580947 (Jashar Rexhepagiq as co-author)
- Folkloric Architecture of the Region of Prizren During the 18th and 19th Centuries (Albanian: Arkitektura folklorike e rajonit të Prizrenit në shekujt XVIII-XIX), 2011, publisher: Academy of Sciences and Arts of Kosovo, Pristina, ISBN 9789951615013 (Shpresë Siqeca; Pajazit Nushi; Hivzi Islami as co-authors)
- Woman and the evolution of birth in Kosovo (Albanian: Femra dhe evolucioni i lindshmërise në Kosovë), 2009, publisher: Academy of Sciences and Arts of Kosovo, Pristina, ISBN 9789951413800 (Mimoza Dushi; Hivzi Islami as co-authors)
- Collection of works, wrap up of a decade of work 1961-1971 (Albanian: Përmbledhje punimesh : me rastin e dhjetëvjetorit të punës 1961-1971), 1972, publisher: Fakulteti Juridik-Ekonomik i Prishtinës, Pristina, OCLC 500049145 (in Albanian and Serbo-Croatian)
- Etno-geographical meaning of Rugova's toponyms (Serbian: Etno-geografsko značenje toponima Rugove), 1982, publisher: Yugoslavian Academy of Arts and Sciences, Zagreb, OCLC 438827593

=== Textbooks ===
- Economical geography (Albanian: Gjeografia ekonomike : enti i teksteve dhe i mjeteve mësimore i Krahinës Socialiste Autonome të Kosovës), permanent faculty text, 1985 (4th edition, previous three in Serbian)
- Geography of Yugoslavia, high school text, 1975, publisher: "Enti i teksteve dhe mjeteve mesimore i Krahinës Socialiste Autonome të Kosovës", OCLC 255896663
- Geography for elementary school, VIII grade, 3rd edition, 1978

=== Publicistics ===
- Positioning and reactions (Albanian: Qëndrime e reagime), publisher: Ars poetica, Pristina, 1995, OCLC 635691315
- Kosovo today: detailed report presented to the Belgian Senate, 1992, Brussels, in German and English, OCLC 500191038
- Endeavors for Kosovo (Albanian: Përpjekje për Kosovën), 2002, publisher: Albanian Christian Democratic Party of Kosovo, Pristina, OCLC 500189873

=== Poetry ===
- "Grandpa's tales" (Albanian: "Përrallat e gjyshit"), 1953, publisher: "Mustafa Bakija", Pristina, OCLC 40093006
- "First light" (Albanian: "Drita e parë"), 1956
- "Ordered mail" (Albanian: "Posta e porositur"), 1959, publisher: Rilindja, Pristina, OCLC 320079155
- "Illiterate rabbit" (Albanian: "Lepuri analfabet"), 1974
- "Mountain postman" (Albanian: "Postieri i maleve"), 1984, publisher: Rilindja, Pristina, OCLC 500047749 (Drita M Jovanović as co-author)
- "Time's echo" (Albanian: "Jehona e kohës"), 1972, publisher: Shtëpia botuese "Naim Frashëri", Tirana, OCLC 13445098
- "Beetle's tower" (Albanian: "Kulla e buburrecit"), 1989, publisher: Rilindja, Pristina, OCLC 441007180
- "Snowhite" (Albanian: Borëbardha) (adaptation), 1956
- "Selected poetry for children" (Albanian: "Vjersha të zgjedhura për fëmijë"), 1998

=== Translations ===
- Spiders (Serbian: Pauci) (novel), Ivo Ćipiko, Belgrade, 1909, publisher: "Milladin Popovic", Pristina, 1947
- The Servant Jernej and His Justice (Slovene: Hlapec Jernej in njegova pravica), Ivan Cankar, 1907, publisher: Progres, Pristina, 1949, OCLC: 451225721
- The Tale of Tsar Saltan, Alexander Pushkin, 1831
- The big year 1941 (Albanian: Vjeti i madh), evidence regarding World War II in Yugoslavia, various, publisher: Directory of Information, Government of Serbia P.R., Belgrade, 1950
- Macedonian writers for children (Albanian: Shkrimtarët maqedonas për fëmijë), poetry compilation, various, publisher: Rilindja, Pristina, 1962
- "Zambarja e shelqes", poetry compilation from Grigor Vitez, publisher: SGB Rilindja, Pristina, 1960
- The Tale of the Dead Princess and the Seven Knights (Albanian: Princesha e shtatë vëllaznit), Alexander Pushkin, 1833, publisher: "Mustafa Bakija", Pristina, 1952
- General history, schools and pedagogical ideas (partial translation), Leon Žlebnik, publisher: "Milladin Popoviq", Pristina, 1958
- Hedgehog's house, Branko Ćopić, publisher: Nova Makedonija, Shkup, 1964

==== As co-translator ====
- Read and travel China to Paris, Mayakovsky (co-translator Esad Mekuli), publisher: Directorate of Education for Kosmet, Belgrade, 1948
- The Tale of the Golden Cockerel, Alexander Pushkin, 1834 (co-translator Esad Mekuli), publisher: Directorate of Education for Kosmet, Belgrade, 1949
- Snowhite (adaptation), Hans Christian Andersen, publisher: "Mustafa Bakija", Pristina, 1956
- First book for the homeland, Zagorčić - Herzog, publisher: "Mustafa Bakija", Pristina, 1954 (co-translator Adem Bllaca)
