= President of Kosovo =

Head of state

President of the Republic of Kosovo
- Presidenti i Republikës së Kosovës (in Albanian); Председник Републике Косовo (in Serbian)
- Presidential seal

- Presidential standard

- Incumbent; Justina Shiroka Pula since 7 October 2026
- Executive branch of the Government of Kosovo
- Style: Madam President (informal); Her Excellency (diplomatic)
- Status: Head of state
- Residence: Kosovo Assembly Building
- Seat: Pristina
- Appointer: Kuvendi
- Term length: Five years; Renewable once
- Constituting instrument: Constitution of Kosovo
- Inaugural holder: Ibrahim Rugova
- Formation: 25 January 1992 (de jure); 4 March 2002 (de facto)
- Deputy: Speaker of the Assembly
- Salary: €2,873 monthly
- Website: Official website

The president of Kosovo (Albanian: Presidenti i Kosovës; Serbian: Председник Косова, romanized: Predsednik Kosova), officially the president of the Republic of Kosovo (Albanian: Presidenti i Republikës së Kosovës; Serbian: Председник Републике Косово, romanized: Predsednik Republike Kosovo), is the head of state of the partially recognized Republic of Kosovo. The president is elected indirectly by the parliament through a secret ballot, requiring a two-thirds majority of deputies in office. If no candidate achieves the two-thirds majority, in the third round of voting, the candidate who receives a simple majority is elected. The vote in parliament must take place no later than one month before the end of the incumbent president's term. The president serves a five-year term, which is renewable once.

== Powers ==
- represents the Republic of Kosovo, internally and externally
- guarantees the constitutional functioning of the institutions set forth by the Constitution of Kosovo
- announces elections for the Assembly of Kosovo and convenes its first meeting
- issues decrees in accordance with the Constitution
- promulgates laws approved by the Assembly of Kosovo
- has the right to return adopted laws for reconsideration, when he/she considers them to be harmful to the legitimate interests of the Republic of Kosovo or one or more Communities. This right can be exercised only once per law
- signs international agreements in accordance with this Constitution
- proposes amendments to the Constitution
- may refer constitutional questions to the Constitutional Court of Kosovo
- leads the foreign policy of the country
- receives credentials of heads of diplomatic missions accredited to the Republic of Kosovo
- is the Commander-in-Chief of the Kosovo Security Force
- leads the Consultative Council for Communities
- appoints the candidate for Prime Minister of Kosovo for the establishment of the Government after proposal by the political party or coalition holding the majority in the Assembly
- appoints and dismisses the President of the Supreme Court of the Republic of Kosovo upon the proposal of the Kosovo Judicial Council
- appoints and dismisses judges of the Republic of Kosovo upon the proposal of the Kosovo Judicial Council
- appoints and dismisses the Chief Prosecutor of the Republic of Kosovo upon the proposal of the Kosovo Prosecutorial Council
- appoints and dismisses prosecutors of the Republic of Kosovo upon the proposal of the Kosovo Prosecutorial Council
- appoints judges to the Constitutional Court upon the proposal of the Assembly
- appoints the Commander of the Kosovo Security Force upon recommendation of the Government
- with the Prime Minister, jointly appoints the Director, Deputy Director and Inspector General of the Kosovo Intelligence Agency
- decides to declare a State of Emergency in consultation with the Prime Minister
- may request meetings of the Kosovo Security Council and chairs them during a State of Emergency
- decides on the establishment of diplomatic and consular missions of the Republic of Kosovo in consultation with the Prime Minister
- appoints and dismisses heads of diplomatic missions of the Republic of Kosovo upon the proposal of the Government
- appoints the Chair of the Central Election Commission of Kosovo
- appoints the Governor of the Central Bank of the Republic of Kosovo who will also act as its Managing Director, and appoints the other members of the Bank’s Board
- grants medals, titles of gratitude, and awards in accordance with the law
- grants individual pardons in accordance with the law
- addresses the Assembly of Kosovo at least once a year in regard to her/his scope of authority

== History ==
The first post-war president, who served until his death in January 2006, was Ibrahim Rugova. His successor was Fatmir Sejdiu. When Sejdiu resigned from his post on 27 September 2010, Jakup Krasniqi served as acting president. On 22 February 2011, Behgjet Pacolli was elected as a president of Kosovo, which was quickly evaluated as an unconstitutional move. On 4 April 2011, Pacolli stepped down and it was decided that another candidate would be elected to serve for up to a year. A constitutional reform will be undertaken to allow for a popular vote for the president in 2013. On 7 April 2011, Atifete Jahjaga, Deputy Director of the Kosovo Police, with the rank of major general, was elected as president.

== Officeholders ==
=== Presidents ===
Political parties: LDK AKR Independent PDK Guxo

No.	Portrait	Name (Birth–Death)	Term of office			Political party	Election
No.	Portrait	Name (Birth–Death)	Took office	Left office	Time in office	Political party	Election
Republic of Kosova
1	Ibrahim Rugova	Ibrahim Rugova (1944–2006)	25 January 1992	1 February 2000	8 years, 7 days	LDK	1992
UN-administered Kosovo
(1)	Ibrahim Rugova	Ibrahim Rugova (1944–2006)	4 March 2002	21 January 2006 †	3 years, 323 days	LDK	2002
2	Fatmir Sejdiu	Fatmir Sejdiu (born 1951)	10 February 2006	17 February 2008	2 years, 7 days	LDK	2006
Republic of Kosovo
(2)	Fatmir Sejdiu	Fatmir Sejdiu (born 1951)	17 February 2008	27 September 2010	2 years, 222 days	LDK	2008
3	Behgjet Pacolli	Behgjet Pacolli (born 1951)	22 February 2011	4 April 2011	41 days	AKR	2011
4	Atifete Jahjaga	Atifete Jahjaga (born 1975)	7 April 2011	7 April 2016	5 years	Independent	2011
5	Hashim Thaçi	Hashim Thaçi (born 1968)	7 April 2016	5 November 2020	4 years, 212 days	PDK	2016
6	Vjosa Osmani	Vjosa Osmani (born 1982)	4 April 2021	4 April 2026	5 years	Guxo	2021
7	Justina Shiroka Pula	Justina Shiroka Pula (born 1953)	7 October 2026	Incumbent	38 days	Independent	2026

=== Acting presidents ===
The Acting President of Kosovo (Albanian: Ushtrues i Detyrës së Presidentit të Kosovës, Serbian: Вршилац дужности председника Косова, romanized: Vršilac dužnosti predsednika Kosova) is a temporary position held by the Speaker of the Assembly of Kosovo (Albanian: Kryetari i Kuvendit të Kosovës, (Note: Literally translated as President of the Assembly of Kosovo.) or Kryeparlamentari i Kosovës, (Note: Literally translated as Speaker of the Parliament of Kosovo.) Serbian: Председник Скупштине Косова, romanized: Predsednik Skupštine Kosova) when the President is unable to perform their duties.

The Speaker assumes this role during periods of absence, incapacity, or vacancy in the presidency, serving as the acting head of state until the President resumes office or a new President is elected. The position is limited in duration and cannot be held for more than six months. The Speaker of the Assembly is the first in the presidential line of succession in the Republic of Kosovo.

Political parties: LDK PDK Guxo Vetëvendosje

No.	Portrait	Name (Birth–Death)	Term of office			Political party	Replaced
No.	Portrait	Name (Birth–Death)	Took office	Left office	Time in office	Political party	Replaced
—	Nexhat Daci	Nexhat Daci (1944–2026); Acting	21 January 2006	10 February 2006	20 days	LDK	Ibrahim Rugova
—	Jakup Krasniqi	Jakup Krasniqi (born 1951); Acting	27 September 2010 4 April 2011	22 February 2011 7 April 2011	148 days 3 days	PDK	Fatmir Sejdiu Behgjet Pacolli
—	Vjosa Osmani	Vjosa Osmani (born 1982); Acting	5 November 2020	22 March 2021	137 days	Guxo	Hashim Thaçi
—	Glauk Konjufca	Glauk Konjufca (born 1981); Acting	22 March 2021	4 April 2021	13 days	LVV	Vjosa Osmani
—	Albulena Haxhiu	Albulena Haxhiu (born 1987); Acting	4 April 2026	7 October 2026	186 days	LVV	Vjosa Osmani

== First Lady/Gentleman of Kosovo ==
The title of First Lady/Gentleman of Kosovo is not an elected or constitutionally established position and carries no formal governmental authority, official duties, or salary. The title is primarily ceremonial and may involve accompanying the president at official events, state visits, and public engagements.

Birthname	Relation to the president	Term begins	Term ends
Fana Rugova	wife of President Ibrahim Rugova	25 January 1992	1 February 2000
Fana Rugova	wife of President Ibrahim Rugova	4 March 2002	21 January 2006
Zinete Daci	wife of Acting President Nexhat Daci	21 January 2006	10 February 2006
Nezafete Sejdiu	wife of President Fatmir Sejdiu	10 February 2006	27 September 2010
Sevdije Krasniqi	wife of Acting President Jakup Krasniqi	27 September 2010	22 February 2011
Masha Pacolli	wife of President Behgjet Pacolli	22 February 2011	4 April 2011
Sevdije Krasniqi	wife of Acting President Jakup Krasniqi	4 April 2011	7 April 2011
Astrit Kuçi	ex–husband of President Atifete Jahjaga	7 April 2011	7 April 2016
Lumnije Thaçi	wife of President Hashim Thaçi	7 April 2016	5 November 2020
Prindon Sadriu	husband of Acting President Vjosa Osmani	5 November 2020	22 March 2021
Emira Bajqinca Konjufca	wife of Acting President Glauk Konjufca	22 March 2021	4 April 2021
Prindon Sadriu	husband of President Vjosa Osmani	4 April 2021	4 April 2026
Alban Krasniqi	husband of Acting President Albulena Haxhiu	4 April 2026	7 October 2026
Vacant (Note: Blerim Pula, the husband of Kosovo President Justina Shiroka Pula, passed away on 26 August 2026. Consequently, the position of First Gentleman of Kosovo remains unoccupied.)	President Justina Shiroka Pula is widowed.	7 October 2026	Incumbent

== See also ==
- Prime Minister of Kosovo
- Special Representative of the Secretary-General for Kosovo
- President of the Presidency of SAP Kosovo
