= Jakup Krasniqi =

Kosovan politician (born 1951)

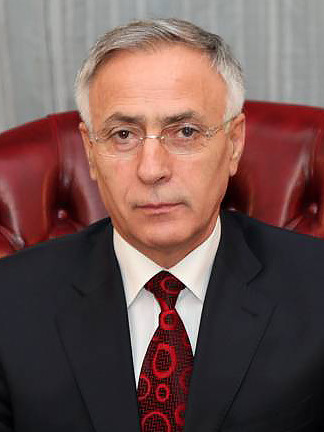
- Krasniqi in 2010

Acting President of Kosovo
- In office 4 April 2011 – 7 April 2011
- Prime Minister: Hashim Thaçi
- Preceded by: Behgjet Pacolli
- Succeeded by: Atifete Jahjaga
- In office 27 September 2010 – 22 February 2011
- Prime Minister: Hashim Thaçi
- Preceded by: Fatmir Sejdiu
- Succeeded by: Behgjet Pacolli

Speaker of the Assembly of the Republic of Kosovo
- In office 12 December 2007 – 17 July 2014
- Preceded by: Kolë Berisha
- Succeeded by: Kadri Veseli

Personal details
- Born: 1 January 1951 (age 75) Negroc, Drenas, Socialist Federal Republic of Yugoslavia (now Glogovac, Kosovo)
- Party: Democratic Party (1999–2014); NISMA (2014–present)
- Spouse: Sevdije Shala
- Children: 4
- Education: University of Pristina

Military service
- Allegiance: Kosova
- Branch/service: Kosovo Liberation Army
- Unit: Military Spokesman

Jakup Krasniqi (born 1 January 1951) is a Kosovan politician who served as Acting President of Kosovo from 2010 to 2011, and as Speaker of the Assembly of the Republic of Kosovo from 2007 to 2014. During the Kosovo War (1998–1999), he served as spokesman for the Kosovo Liberation Army (KLA). In September 2026, the Kosovo Specialist Chambers convicted him of war crimes and sentenced him to 25 years in prison.

== Early life and education ==
Jakup Krasniqi was born in Negroc, Drenas, Socialist Federal Republic of Yugoslavia, on 1 January 1951. He attended a primary school in Negroc from 1957 to 1965, and a secondary school in Pristina from 1966 to 1971. He attended the Philological Faculty from 1972 to 1976, and conducted post-graduate studies at the University of Pristina from 1995 to 1997.

== Career ==
=== Education ===
Krasniqi was a teach in Fatos and Arllat from 1972 to 1977, in Drenas from 1976 to 1977, in Arrlat and Skenderaj from 1979 to 1981, and in Drenas from 1995 to 1998. He was chair of the Education Council in Drenas from 1995 to 1998.

=== Military ===
From 1998 to 1999, he was a spokesman at the headquarters of the Kosovo Liberation Army.

On June 15, 1998, Jakup Krasniqi declared that the organization's sole ideology was Albanianism (shqiptarizmi) and that political pluralism was a luxury at that stage of the war.

=== Politics ===
Krasniqi was a member of the illegal political group Kosovo National Movement from 1973 to 1981. He was arrested for his political activities and imprisoned from 1981 to 1991. From 1992 to 1998, Krasniqi was a member of the Parliament of Kosova. He was general secretary of the Democratic Party of Kosovo from 1998 to 2003.

In the 2001 election Krasniqi won a seat in the Assembly of the Republic of Kosovo. He was reelected in 2004 and 2007. Krasniqi was Minister for Reconstruction and Development from 1999 to 2000. He was Minister of Public Services from 2002 to 2004.

Upon the resignation of Fatmir Sejdiu Krasniqi became acting president from 27 September 2010 to 22 February 2011. He served as acting president again from 1 April to 7 April 2011, after the resignation of President Behgjet Pacolli.

== War crimes trial ==
Krasniqi was arrested by the European Union Rule of Law Mission in Kosovo for crimes against humanity and war crimes, and sent to The Hague in 2020. Hashim Thaçi, Rexhep Selimi, Kadri Veseli, and Krasniqi were put on trial for torture and 102 murders conducted during the Kosovo War. All of the defendants pleaded not guilty. The Kosovo Specialist Chambers found all four guilty of war crimes on 16 September 2026, which included the arbitrary detention of 385 people, cruel treatment against 49 people, torture against 303 people, and the murder of 96 people. Krasniqi was sentence to 25 years in prison.

== Personal life ==
Krasniqi is the father of four children. He can speak English, Croatian, and Serbian.

== Books ==
- The Great Turn – Kosovo Liberation Army (2006)
- Kosovo in historical context (2007)
- A Different War for Kosovo (2007)
- Independence as a compromise (2010)
- The Movement for the Republic of Kosovo 1981-1991 (2011)
- Dare to Love Freedom (2011)
- Spring of Freedom '81 (2011)
- Sacrifice for Freedom (2011)
- Independence and Personalities: on the 100th Anniversary of Albania's Independence (2012)
- Skanderbeg and messages for the 21st century (2018)
- The Art of Negotiation (2018)
- Historical confrontations for liberation and national unification (2019)
- Serbian aggression and the Kosovo tax (2021)

== Works cited ==
=== News ===
- "Kosovo war crimes suspect Krasniqi arrested, sent to The Hague". Al Jazeera English. 5 November 2020. Archived from the original on 5 July 2025.
- Bami, Xhorxhina (5 December 2024). "Former Kosovo Guerrilla Officer Claims 'Victory' as War Crime Investigation Ends". Balkan Insight. Archived from the original on 5 July 2025.
- Corder, Mike (4 April 2023). "Ex-Kosovo president tells international judges he's innocent". Associated Press. Archived from the original on 4 December 2023.

=== Web ===
- "Dr. Jakup Krasniqi". President of Kosovo. Archived from the original on 11 February 2025.
- "Kosovo: War crimes convictions of former president 'shows senior officials are not above the law'". Amnesty International. 16 September 2026. Archived from the original on 16 September 2026.
- "President of the Assembly". Assembly of the Republic of Kosovo. Archived from the original on 21 May 2012.

Political offices
Preceded by Kolë Berisha	Chairman of the Assembly; 2007–2014	Succeeded by Kadri Veseli
Preceded by Fatmir Sejdiu	President of Kosovo; Acting; 2010–2011	Succeeded by Behgjet Pacolli
Preceded by Behgjet Pacolli	President of Kosovo; Acting; 2011	Succeeded by Atifete Jahjaga
