= Kosova Academy of Sciences and Arts =

National academy of Kosovo

Coordinates: 42.6600°N 21.1652°E

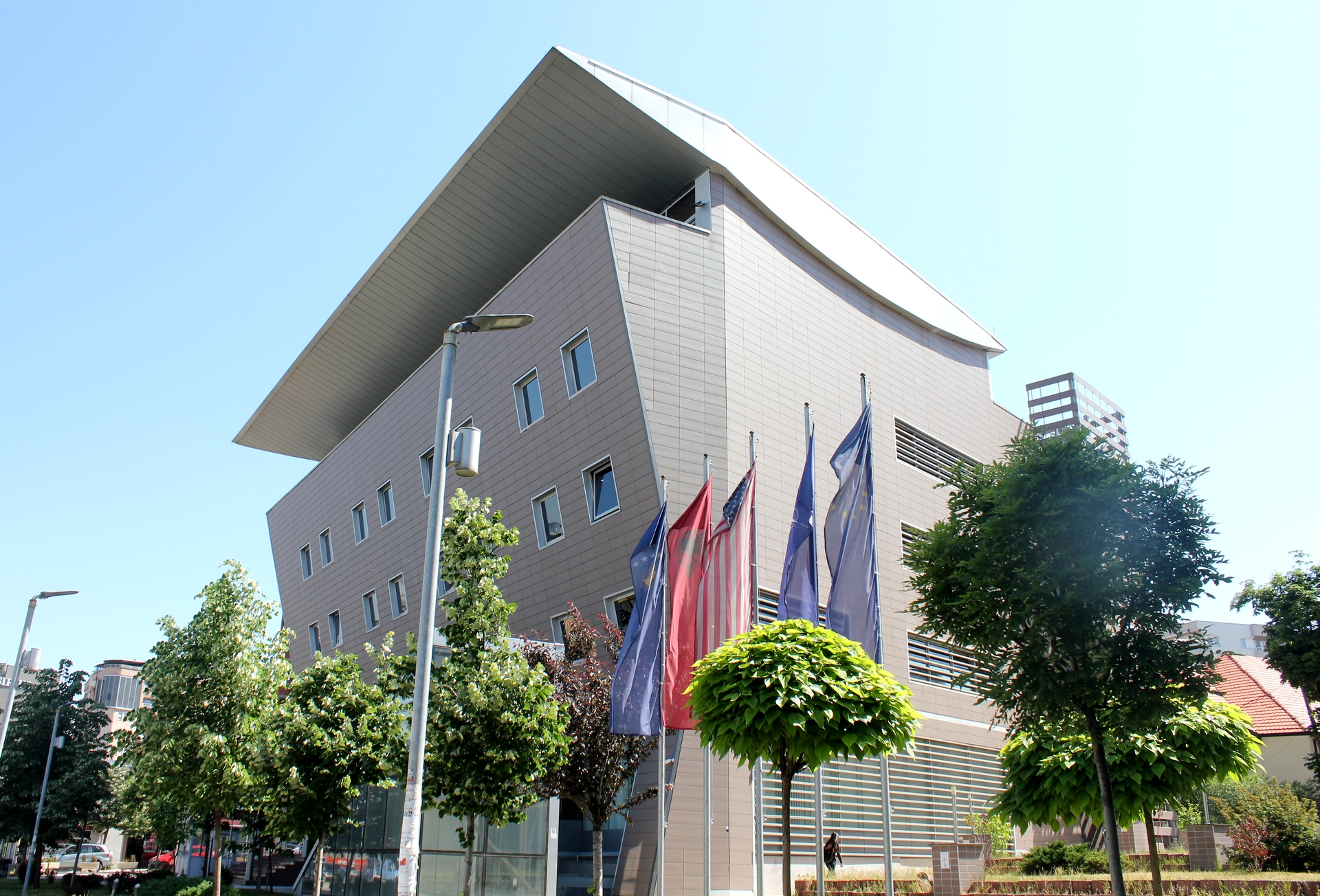
- Kosova Academy of Sciences and Arts in Prishtina
- Abbreviation: ASHAK
- Formation: 20 December 1975
- Type: National Academy
- Purpose: Science, Arts
- Headquarters: Pristina, Kosovo
- Location: Kosovo
- Members: 23 regular and 14 associate members (2024)
- President: Fejzullah Krasniqi
- Main organ: Presidency of the Academy
- Website: Kosova Academy of Sciences and Arts

Cultural Heritage under Permanent Protection
- Official name: Shtëpi banimi (Ish Akademia e Shkencave dhe Arteve)
- Type: Architectural Heritage: Monument/Ensemble
- Reference no.: 2871

The Kosova Academy of Sciences and Arts (Albanian: Akademia e Shkencave dhe e Arteve e Kosovës, Latin: Academia Scientiarum et Artium Kosoviensis) is the national academy of Kosovo.

== History and organization ==
The Kosova Academy of Sciences and Arts is the highest institution of science and art in Kosova, with headquarters in Prishtina, established by decision of the Assembly of Kosova on December 20, 1975. By law and other by-laws, ASHAK is defined as an independent institution, which unites its membership of scientists and artists from the most prominent in the country. The activity of the Academy is of special public and national interest, the purpose of which is the development and promotion of research-scientific and artistic work in Kosova, care for the implementation of scientific achievements and the cultivation of artistic values in the country, as well as the development of cooperation international scientific and artistic. ASHAK is an honorary institution, without executive powers, only with moral and intellectual influence on general social developments, particularly in the development of scientific thought, in public, educational, cultural and artistic activities. It is financed from the budget of the Government of Kosova.

== Members ==
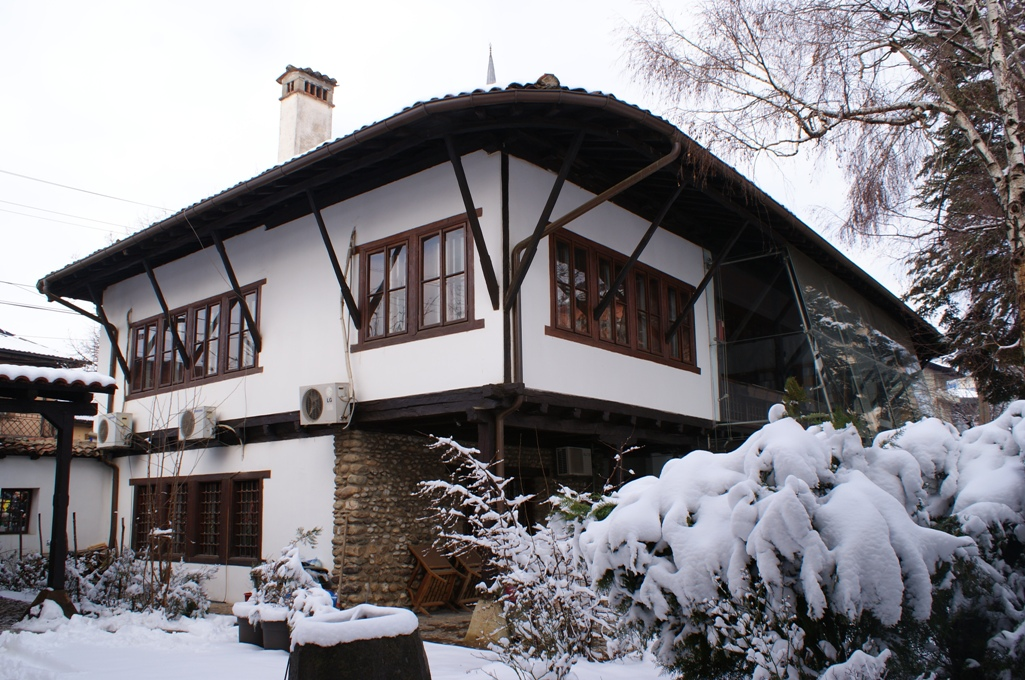
Old seat of the Academy

The academy has 23 regular and 14 associate members. The current president of the academy is vacant. Luan Mulliqi was the last general secretary of academy. The heads of the divisions include Sabri Hamiti, Gjyljeta Mushkolaj, Fetah Podvorica and Rauf Dhomi. Honorary members include personalities like Albanian-American Nobel Prize winner Ferid Murad and Mother Teresa.
