= Hans Hækkerup =

Danish politician (1945–2013)

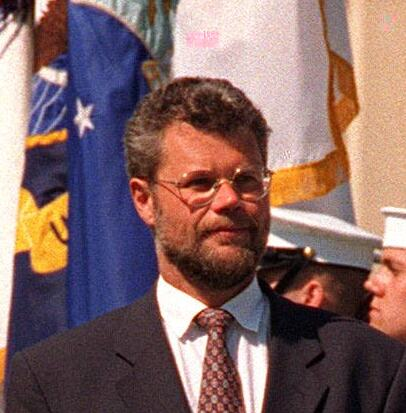
- Hækkerup in 1997

Personal details
- Born: 3 December 1945
- Died: 22 December 2013 (aged 68)
- Spouses: Lisa Hækkerup; Susanne Rumohr-Hækkerup (m. 2011)

Hans Hækkerup (3 December 1945 – 22 December 2013) was a Danish politician who served as a member of parliament (Folketing).

== Career ==
After working in several government ministries, Hækkerup was elected to the Folketing in 1979. He held several committee memberships including the Committee on Danish Security Policy, the Committee on Greenlandic Affairs, the Committee on Foreign Affairs and the Committee on Foreign Policy. He was Chairman of the Defense Committee from 1991 to 1993.

== Personal life ==
Hækkerup was previously married to Lisa Hækkerup. In 2011, Hækkerup was living in Mexico, where his second wife, Susanne Rumohr Hækkerup, was the Danish ambassador.

In April 2011 it was reported that Hækkerup was suffering from multiple system atrophy. He died from the disease on 22 December 2013.
