= 2012 in Kosovo =

- Decades: 1990s; 2000s; 2010s; 2020s
- See also: History of Kosovo; Timeline of Kosovo history; List of years in Kosovo

Events in the year 2012 in Kosovo.

== Incumbents ==
- President: Atifete Jahjaga
- Prime Minister: Hashim Thaçi

== Events ==
Ongoing – North Kosovo crisis (2011–2013)

- 23 January: Ghana recognizes Kosovo.
- 3 October: Papua New Guinea recognizes the independence of Kosovo.
- 29 November: A UN war crimes tribunal acquits former Kosovan Prime Minister and former commander of the Kosovo Liberation Army Ramush Haradinaj of war crimes, prompting Serbia to denounce the court.
- 24 December: Pakistan decides to accord recognition to the Republic of Kosovo.

== See also ==
- 2012 in Europe
