= 2026 in Kosovo =

- Decades: 2000s; 2010s; 2020s
- See also: History of Kosovo; Timeline of Kosovo history; List of years in Kosovo

Events in the year 2026 in Kosovo.

== Incumbents ==
- President: Vjosa Osmani (until 4 April); Albulena Haxhiu (acting, since 4 April; de facto since 5 October)
- Prime Minister: Albin Kurti

== Events ==
Ongoing: 2025–2026 Kosovo political deadlock

=== January ===
- 23 January – Authorities announce the detention of 109 people on suspicion of committing electoral fraud in Prizren during the December 2025 Kosovan parliamentary election.

=== February ===
- 11 February – The Assembly of Kosovo approves a new government after prime minister-designate Albin Kurti wins 66 of 120 votes in the chamber.

=== March ===
- 5 March – 2026 Kosovan presidential election (first round)
- 6 March – President Vjosa Osmani dissolves the Assembly of Kosovo, attempting to set new parliamentary elections within 45 days after it fails to elect a new president. Vetëvendosje maintains that the constitution allows parliament 60 more days to try to elect a president and challenges Osmani's decree at the Constitutional Court.
- 9 March – The Constitutional Court issues an injunction that freezes President Osmani's decree dissolving the Assembly of the Republic, while also preventing both the President from calling snap elections and the assembly from carrying out parliamentary business until the Constitutional Court delivers its final ruling.
- 30 March – Kosovo approves the deployment of troops to the Gaza Strip as part of an international peacekeeping force.

=== April ===
- 4 April – Albulena Haxhiu becomes acting president following the expiration of Vjosa Osmani's tenure.
- 24 April – The Basic Court in Pristina sentences three ethnic Serbs to between 30 years to life imprisonment for their role in the Banjska attack in 2023.
- 28 April – 2026 Kosovan presidential election (second round): The Assembly of Kosovo fails to elect a new president, triggering snap parliamentary elections.

=== June ===
- 7 June – 2026 Kosovan parliamentary election: The ruling Vetevendosje party wins 53 of 120-seats in the Assembly of the Republic.

=== August ===
- 8 August – AAK MP Time Kadrijaj throws eggs at acting Prime Minister Albin Kurti during a session of the Assembly.

=== September ===
- 13 September – The Assembly of Kosovo is declared constituted by acting president and speaker Albulena Haxhiu, but without the deputy speaker from the PDK. The Assembly then accepts the fourth cabinet of incumbent prime minister Albin Kurti. The PDK and the AAK both challenge the legitimacy of Kurti's government at the Constitutional Court.
- 16 September – Former president Hashim Thaçi is sentenced by the Kosovo Specialist Chambers to 25 years imprisonment for war crimes committed during the Kosovo War.

=== October ===
- 5 October –
  - The acting presidency of Albulena Haxhiu becomes de facto due to her having continuously served in the position for more than six months since assuming office on 4 April, violating the third paragraph of Article 90 in the constitution.
  - Protesters clash with police in Pristina after parliament fails to advance legislation limiting the Kosovo Specialist Chambers' powers. One police officer and 11 civilians are injured.
- 6 October – 2026 Kosovan presidential election: The Kuvendi elects Justina Shiroka Pula as president.

== Deaths ==
- 1 January – Nexhat Daci, 81, acting president (2006) and chairman of the Assembly (2001–2006).
- 23 April – Rexhep Qosja, 89, writer, representative to the Interim Administrative Council (1999–2002).
- 7 June – Fatjon Bunjaku, 22, footballer (Phoenix Banjë, Malisheva, AF Elbasani).
- 15 September – Flora Brovina, 76, poet, speaker of the Assembly (2014).

== See also ==
- 2026 in Europe
