= 2025 in Kosovo =

- Decades: 2000s; 2010s; 2020s
- See also: History of Kosovo; Timeline of Kosovo history; List of years in Kosovo

Events in the year 2025 in Kosovo.

== Incumbents ==
- President: Vjosa Osmani
- Prime Minister: Albin Kurti

== Events ==
=== January ===
- 15 January – Authorities announce the closure of all "parallel institutions" linked with Serbia following raids in offices across ten municipalities inhabited by Kosovo Serbs.

=== February ===
- 9 February – February 2025 Kosovan parliamentary election: No party wins a majority in the Assembly of Kosovo, with the ruling Vetëvendosje party winning 40% of the vote.

=== March ===
- 26 March – Kenya formally recognizes Kosovo as an independent sovereign state.

=== April ===
- 12 April – Sudan formally recognizes Kosovo as a sovereign independent state.

=== September ===
- 12 September – The United States suspends negotiations with Kosovo, citing actions by the caretaker government that contribute to political instability in the country.

=== October ===
- 12 October – 2025 Kosovan local elections (first round)
- 29 October – Syria officially recognizes Kosovo as an independent state.

=== November ===
- 9 November – 2025 Kosovan local elections (second round)
- 19 November – The Assembly of the Republic fails to elect a new government after prime minister-designate Glauk Konjufca wins only 56 of 120 votes in the chamber, triggering new parliamentary elections.

=== December ===
- 12 December – Kosovo begins accepting migrants deported from the United States following agreement with the US government.
- 19 December – Bahamas recognizes Kosovo as an independent country. Both countries establish diplomatic relations.
- 28 December – December 2025 Kosovan parliamentary election: No party wins a clear majority in the Assembly of Kosovo, with the ruling Vetëvendosje party winning 50.8% of the vote.

== Holidays ==
- 1–2 January – New Year's Day
- 7 January – Orthodox Christmas
- 17 February – Independence Day
- 30 March – Eid al-Fitr
- 9 April – Constitution Day
- 21 April – Catholic Easter Monday
- 21 April – Orthodox Easter Monday
- 1 May – Labour Day
- 9 May – Europe Day
- 6 June – Eid al-Adha
- 25 December - Catholic Christmas

== Deaths ==
- 6 May – Kaqusha Jashari, 78, president of the Executive Council of SAP Kosovo (1987–1989).
- 10 June – Bujar Bukoshi, 78, prime minister (1991–2000).

== See also ==
- 2025 in Europe
