= 2022 in Kosovo =

- Decades: 2000s; 2010s; 2020s
- See also: History of Kosovo; Timeline of Kosovo history; List of years in Kosovo

Events in the year 2022 in Kosovo.

== Incumbents ==
- President: Vjosa Osmani
- Prime Minister: Albin Kurti

== Events ==
Ongoing — COVID-19 pandemic in Kosovo

=== January–June ===
- 15 January – The national assembly in an extraordinary session voted to ban Kosovo Serbs from voting in Serbia's upcoming constitutional referendum on Kosovan territory.
- 3 March – The national assembly approved a resolution requesting the government to begin negotiations for the country's entry into NATO.
- 4 June – The first suspected case of monkeypox was reported in the nation in Dragash.

=== July–December ===
- 31 July – Police in North Kosovo closed two border crossings with Serbia after local Serbs protesting an order to switch Serbian license plates to Kosovan ones within two months blocked roads and fired shots at police.
- 27 August – Prime Minister Albin Kurti and President of Serbia Aleksandar Vučić agreed on a freedom of movement arrangement between the two nations.
- 23 November – Kosovo and Serbia agree a European Union (EU) brokered deal to end a dispute over Kosovar license plates in North Kosovo, which triggered protests last year.
- 8 December – 2022 North Kosovo crisis: The Kosovo special forces block the city of Kosovska Mitrovica after the Kosovo Police announced that they will increase their presence in North Kosovo.
- 9 December – 2022 North Kosovo crisis: Prime Minister of Serbia Ana Brnabić says Serbia is close to deploying its Armed Forces to North Kosovo after claiming the lives of the minority Kosovo Serbs there are "being threatened," and that the NATO-led Kosovo Force was "failing to protect them."
- 11 December – 2022 North Kosovo crisis:
  - Kosovo Serb protesters in North Kosovo block main roads for a second day following a nighttime exchange of fire with Kosovo Police after the arrest of a Serb former policeman, amid rising tensions between authorities and Kosovo's Serb minority.
  - Prime Minister Kurti states that "the barricades from masked criminals in the north must be removed immediately."
  - Serbian President Vučić calls an emergency meeting of the Serbian National Security Council. After the meeting, Vučić states that "it is important to call on Serbs and Albanians to keep the peace" and that he "made certain decisions and gave orders."
- 15 December – Serbian President Vučić announces that the Serbian government will send a request to KFOR for the return of a certain number, "from hundreds to a thousand", of police and army personnel to Kosovo, in accordance with UN Resolution 1244.
- 28 December – Two border crossings with Serbia are closed after protesters in Serbia block them to support the ethnic Serbs mounting barricades in northern Kosovo, refusing to recognize the country's independence.
- 29 December – Following talks with Serbian president Vučić, the barricades erected by Kosovo Serbs in North Kosovo begin being dismantled.

== Deaths ==
- 22 June – Xhevdet Bajraj, poet (b. 1960)

== See also ==
- 2022 in Europe
- COVID-19 pandemic in Europe
