= 2018 in Kosovo =

- Decades: 1990s; 2000s; 2010s; 2020s
- See also: History of Kosovo; Timeline of Kosovo history; List of years in Kosovo

Events in the year 2018 in Kosovo.

== Incumbents ==
- President: Hashim Thaçi
- Prime Minister: Ramush Haradinaj

== Deaths ==
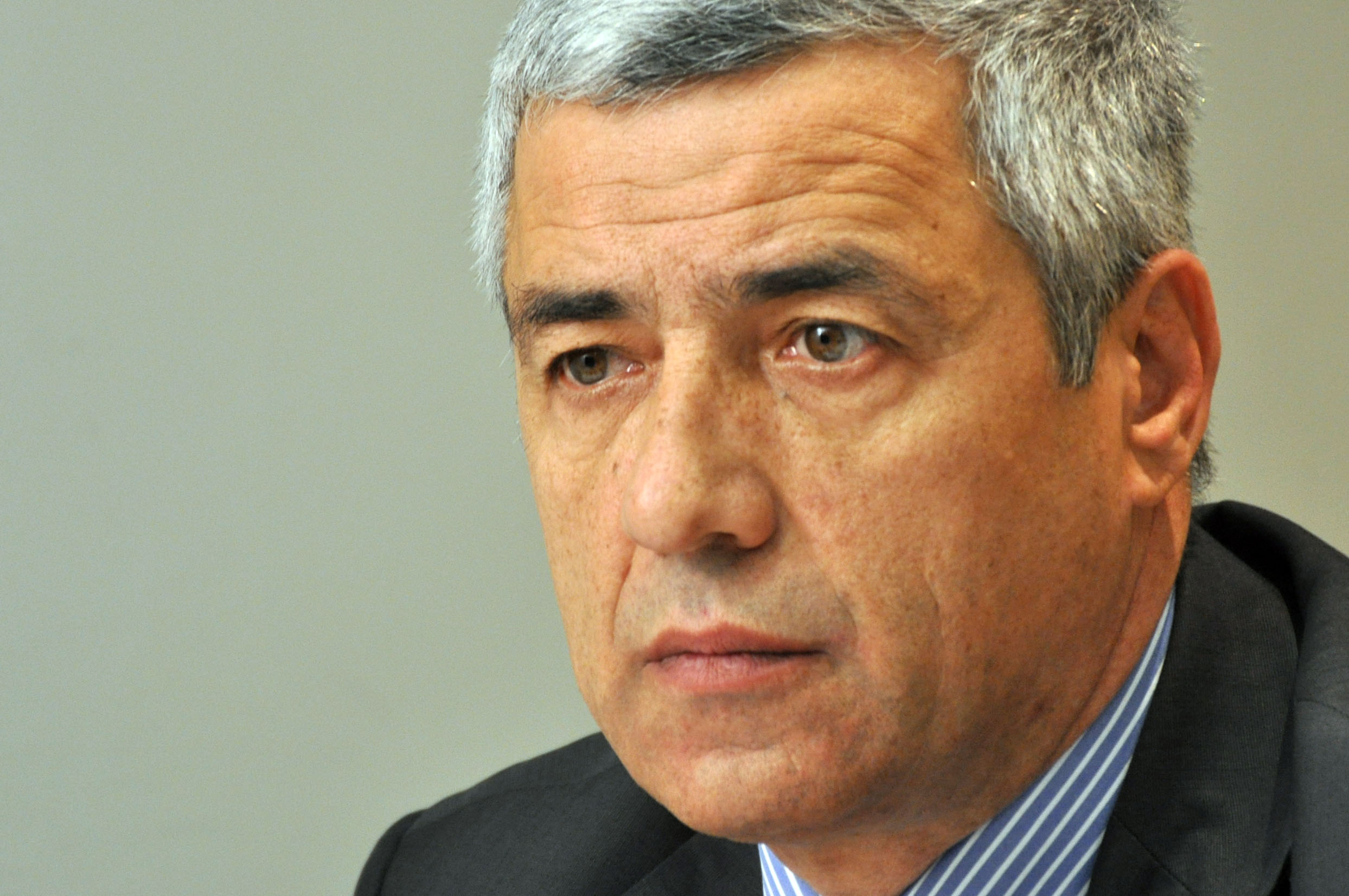
Oliver Ivanović

- 16 January – Oliver Ivanović, politician (b. 1953).
- 9 June – Fadil Vokrri, footballer (b. 1960).

== See also ==
- 2018 in Europe
