= 2021 in Kosovo =

- Decades: 2000s; 2010s; 2020s
- See also: History of Kosovo; Timeline of Kosovo history; List of years in Kosovo

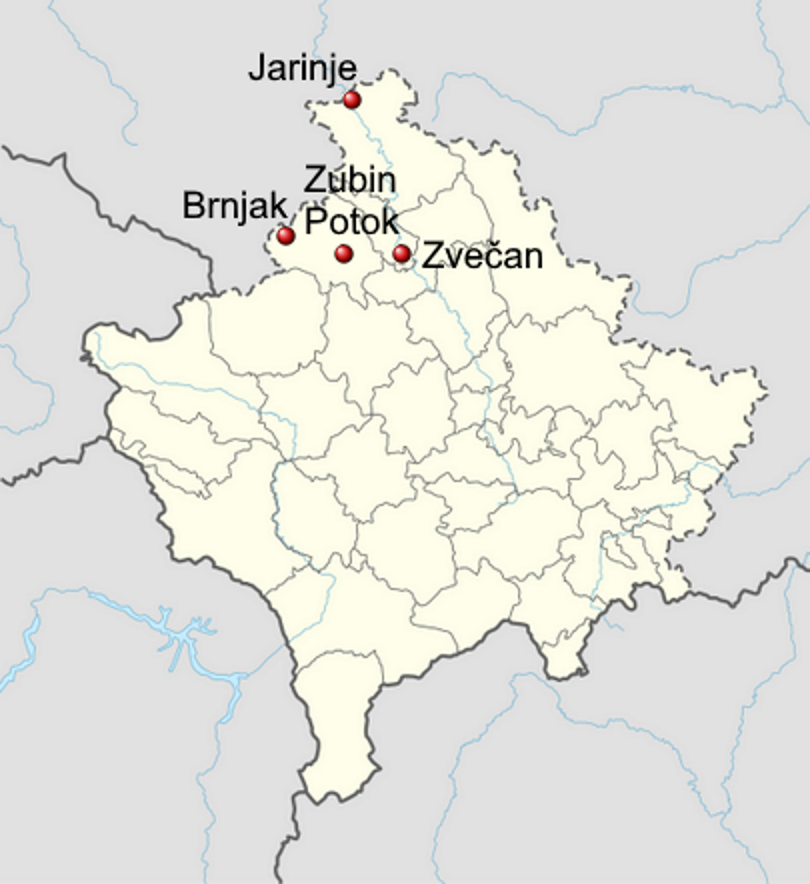
Locations of protests against the Serbian license plate ban, 2021

Events in the year 2021 in Kosovo.

== Incumbents ==
- President: Vjosa Osmani
- Prime Minister: Avdullah Hoti (until 22 March); Albin Kurti (from 22 March)

== Events ==
Ongoing — COVID-19 pandemic in Kosovo

- 14 February – The 2021 Kosovan presidential election took place.
- 20 September – North Kosovo tensions and road blockages after a license-plate bill allowing Kosovars of any ethnicity to have Serbian license-plates had expired and Kosovar authorities began confiscating the license-plates.
- 23 September – Serbia begins moving troops to Kosovo border and places troops on high alert.
- 25 September – Internal ministry buildings were attacked and set on fire in Northern Kosovo.
- 26 November – A gunman opened fire in central Kosovo on a bus carrying students, killing two of them, a boy and a girl, and the driver. In addition, a 14-year-old was injured but his condition is stable. According to local media, the gunman wore a mask and was armed with an AK–47 submachine gun. Kosovo President Vjosa Osmani condemned the attack and asked the police to find the culprits as soon as possible and bring them to justice. "Hitting a bus with students is a blow to security and order," she wrote on Facebook.
- November – The Bajgora Wind Farm began operating.

== Deaths ==
29 August – Kolë Berisha, politician (b. 1947)

== See also ==
- 2021 in the European Union
- COVID-19 pandemic in Europe
