= 2016 in Kosovo =

- Decades: 1990s; 2000s; 2010s; 2020s
- See also: History of Kosovo; Timeline of Kosovo history; List of years in Kosovo

Events in the year 2016 in Kosovo.

== Incumbents ==
- President: Atifete Jahjaga (until 7 April) Hashim Thaçi (from 7 April)
- Prime Minister: Isa Mustafa

== Events ==
- 3 May – Kosovo is allowed membership of FIFA and UEFA.
- 5–21 August – Kosovo competes at the 2016 Summer Olympics in Rio de Janeiro, the first time the country had sent competitors to the event since the expulsion of Yugoslavia from the Games in 1992.

== See also ==
- 2016 in Europe
