= 2020 in Kosovo =

- Decades: 2000s; 2010s; 2020s
- See also: History of Kosovo; Timeline of Kosovo history; List of years in Kosovo

Events from the year 2020 in Kosovo.

== Incumbents ==
- President: Hashim Thaçi
- Prime Minister: Avdullah Hoti

== Events ==
Ongoing — COVID-19 pandemic in Kosovo

- 13 March – The first two cases of COVID-19 in the country were confirmed, a 77-year-old man from Vitina and an Italian woman in her early 20s, who worked in Klina with Caritas Kosova.
- 18 March – The interior minister, Agim Veliu was sacked due to his support for declaring a state of emergency to handle the COVID-19 pandemic which would have given power to the Kosovo Security Council chaired by President of Kosovo, Hashim Thaçi.
- 25 March – The Kurti cabinet was overthrown by a no-confidence motion initiated in assembly by the ruling partner.
- 24 June – The Specialist Prosecutor's Office announces that it has submitted for court approval an indictment against President Hashim Thaçi and nine other former Kosovo Liberation Army fighters alleging that they committed war crimes and crimes against humanity during the Kosovo War. Following the announcement, President Thaçi cancels his upcoming trip to the United States.

== See also ==
- 2020 in Europe
- COVID-19 pandemic in Europe
