= 2017 in Kosovo =

- Decades: 1990s; 2000s; 2010s; 2020s
- See also: History of Kosovo; Timeline of Kosovo history; List of years in Kosovo

Events in the year 2017 in Kosovo.

== Incumbents ==
- President: Hashim Thaçi
- Prime Minister: Isa Mustafa (until 9 September) Ramush Haradinaj (from 9 September)

== Events ==
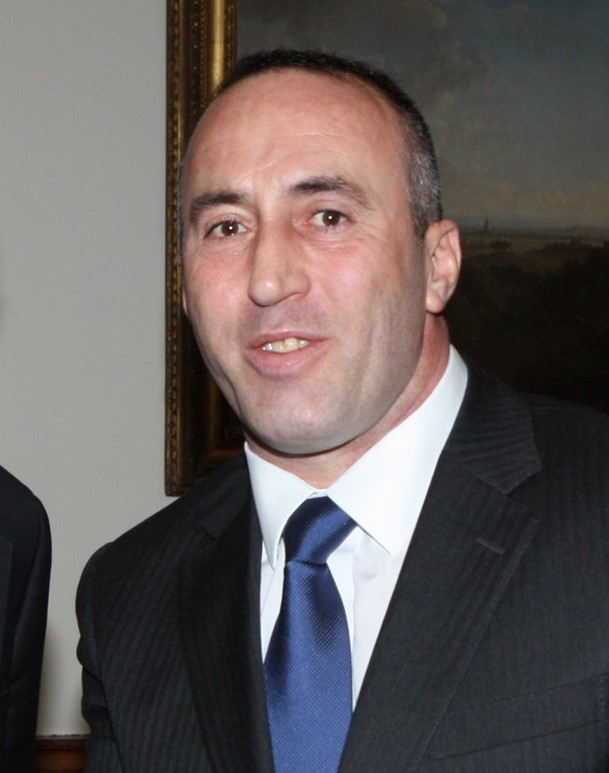
Ramush Haradinaj, new Prime Minister in September

- 11 June – The 2017 Kosovan parliamentary election took place.
- 9 September – Ramush Haradinaj became the next Prime Minister of the nation, leading a coalition government.
- 22 October – The 2017 Kosovan local elections took place.

== Deaths ==
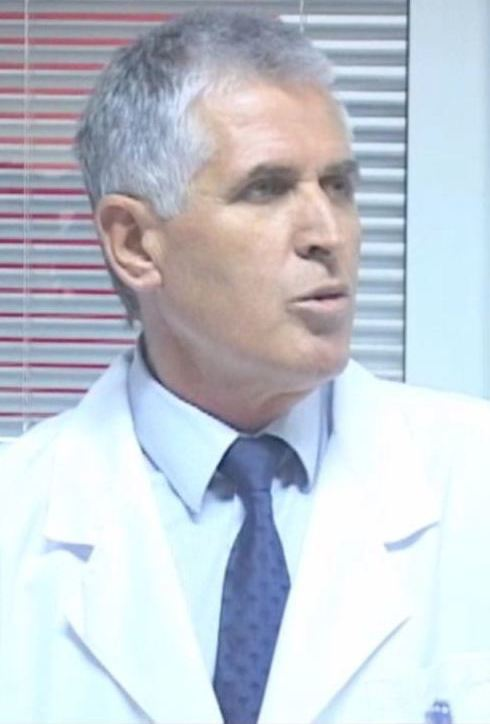
Bajram Rexhepi

- 21 August – Bajram Rexhepi, politician (b. 1954).

== See also ==
- 2017 in Europe
