= 2019 in Kosovo =

- Decades: 1990s; 2000s; 2010s; 2020s
- See also: History of Kosovo; Timeline of Kosovo history; List of years in Kosovo

Events from the year 2019 in Kosovo.

== Incumbents ==
- President: Hashim Thaçi
- Prime Minister: Ramush Haradinaj

== Events ==
- 10–14 April – The 2019 IHF Inter-Continental Trophy was held in Pristina.

== Deaths ==
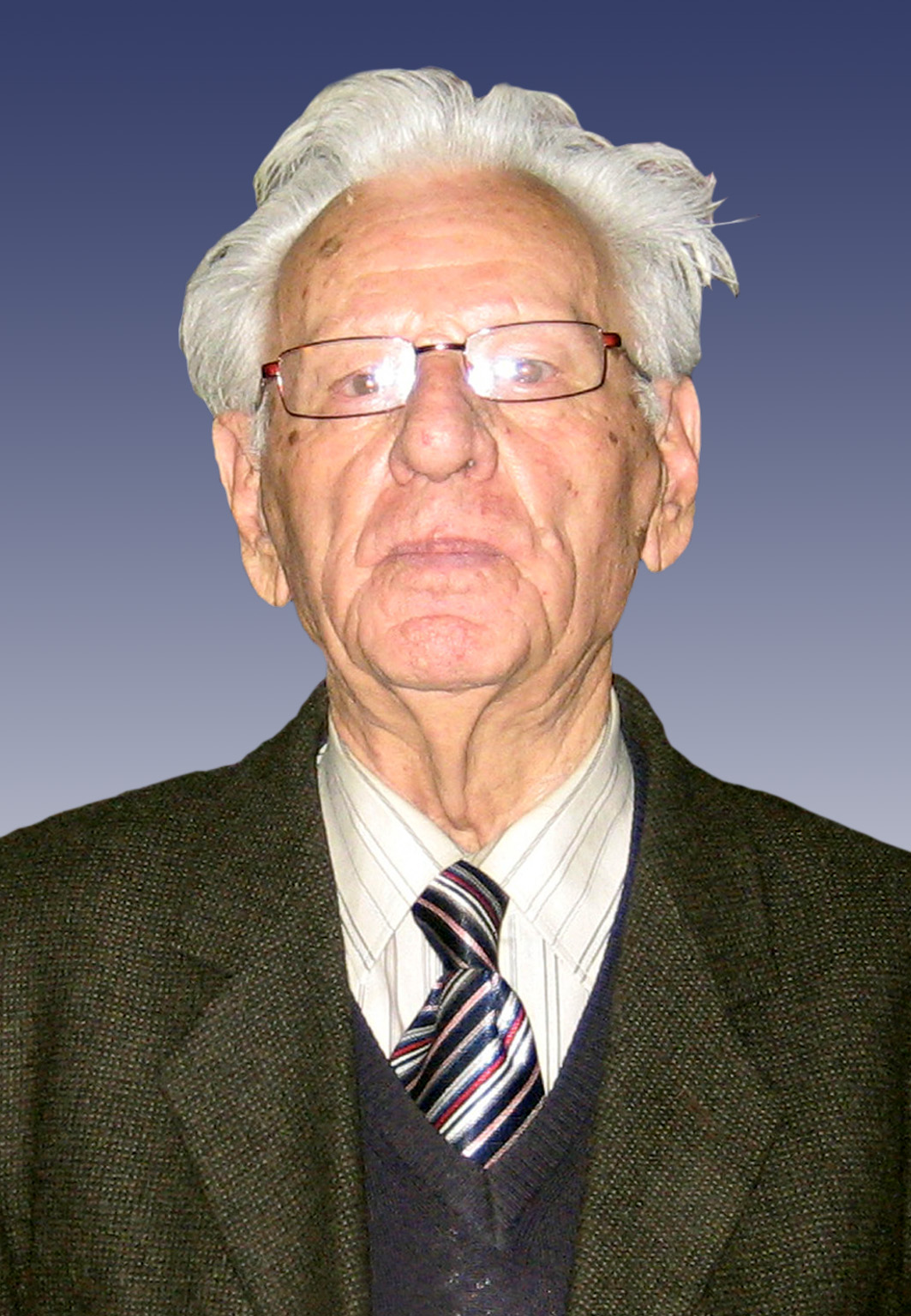
Idriz Ajeti

- 13 February – Idriz Ajeti, Albanologist (b. 1917).

== See also ==
- 2019 in Europe
