= 2024 in Kosovo =

- Decades: 2000s; 2010s; 2020s
- See also: History of Kosovo; Timeline of Kosovo history; List of years in Kosovo

Events in the year 2024 in Kosovo.

== Incumbents ==
- President: Vjosa Osmani
- Prime Minister: Albin Kurti

== Events ==
=== April ===
- 21 April: A referendum on whether to remove ethnic Albanian mayors from office in four municipalities of Serbian-majority North Kosovo is boycotted by most Serbs, who demand that the mayors resign.

=== May ===
- 16 May: Foreign minister Donika Gërvalla-Schwarz writes to the Council of Europe for member nations to consider Kosovo entry into the council.
- 20 May: Police close six branches of the Serbia-based Poštanska štedionica bank for violating laws against the usage of the Serbian dinar in its transactions.

=== June ===
- 18 June: Kosovo and Israel sign a visa waiver agreement allowing their citizens to travel between their countries without a visa beginning in September.
- 28 June: A court in Pristina convicts four ethnic Serbs for the 2018 murder of Oliver Ivanović and sentences them to between four and ten years' imprisonment.

=== July ===
- 16 July: The Kosovo Specialist Chambers convicts former Kosovo Liberation Army commander Pjetër Shala of war crimes during the Kosovo War in 1999 and sentences him to 18 years' imprisonment.

=== August ===
- 30 August: Kosovar authorities shut down five "parallel" governing institutions serving the ethnic Serb minority in the north of the country, citing violations of Kosovar laws.

=== September ===
- 6 September: Kosovar authorities close the Brnjak and Merdare border crossings with Serbia following a blockade by protesters on the latter side of the border.

=== October ===
- 7 October: The government announces the resumption of imports at border crossings with Serbia after they had been halted in June 2023 due to security issues.

=== November ===
- 29 November: An explosion near Zubin Potok damages a canal supplying water to two power plants and causes outages in water supply and electricity nationwide. The Kosovar government blames Serbia for the incident.

=== December ===
- 5 December:
  - Nine MPs of the Serb List are expelled from the Assembly of the Republic for repeated provocations and prolonged absences from the chamber.
  - The Kosovo Specialist Chambers orders the arrest of three military officers for crimes committed during the Kosovo War in 1999.
- 23 December: The Central Election Commission bans the Serb List from standing in the 2025 Kosovan parliamentary election, citing its refusal to recognise Kosovo as an independent state and its ties to the Serbian government. The decision is overturned by the Electoral Panel for Complaints and Appeals on 25 December.

== Holidays ==
- 1–2 January – New Year's Day
- 7 January – Orthodox Christmas
- 17 February – Independence Day
- 1 April - Catholic Easter Monday
- 9 April – Constitution Day
- 10 April – Eid al-Fitr
- 1 May – Labour Day
- 6 May – Orthodox Easter Monday
- 9 May – Europe Day
- 16 June – Eid al-Adha
- 25 December - Catholic Christmas

== See also ==
- 2024 in Europe
