= 2014 in Kosovo =

- Decades: 1990s; 2000s; 2010s; 2020s
- See also: History of Kosovo; Timeline of Kosovo history; List of years in Kosovo

Events in the year 2014 in Kosovo.

== Incumbents ==
- President: Atifete Jahjaga
- Prime Minister: Hashim Thaçi (until 9 December) Isa Mustafa (since 9 December)

== Events ==
- 7 May – President Jahjaga confirmed the date of the upcoming parliamentary elections was to take place on 8 June.
- 8 June – The 2014 Kosovan parliamentary election took place.

== See also ==
- 2014 in Europe
