= Panorc =

Panorc: Panorc/Panorci (Albanian); Понорац/Ponorac (Serbian)
- Village
- Interactive map of Panorc
- Location: Kosovo
- District: Prizren
- Municipality: Malisheva
- Elevation: 517 m (1,696 ft)

Population (2011)
  - Total: 997
- Time zone: UTC+1 (CET)
  - Summer (DST): UTC+2 (CEST)

Panorc (Serbian: Понорац, Ponorac) is a village in the District of Prizren, Kosovo. It is situated in the Malisheva municipality, with a population of 997, exclusively Albanian.

== History ==
On 3 September 1998, hundreds of civilians were rounded up and detained in front of a school by the Ministry of Internal Affairs in Panorc. Paramilitary units were involved in the operation. The civilians were tortured. The photos of the civilians in Panorc was published and became a well-known photo.

== Geography ==
Panorc is located in the Llapusha region of Kosovo. It has a cave named Shpella e Panorcit or Shpella e Flladit. The village is situated near the Barjak mountain peak.

== Notable people ==
Xhevdet Bajraj, 1960-2022, Kosovo Albanian poet who resided in Mexico.

Xhemajli Bajraj, 1927-2009, former mayor of Rahovec and Malishevë municipalities, member of the provincial assembly during the 2 July 1990 vote for republic status and the 7 September 1990 proclamation of the Republic of Kosova.

Fadil Bajraj, born 1958, Kosovo Albanian translator and author.
