= 2013 in Kosovo =

- Decades: 1990s; 2000s; 2010s; 2020s
- See also: History of Kosovo; Timeline of Kosovo history; List of years in Kosovo

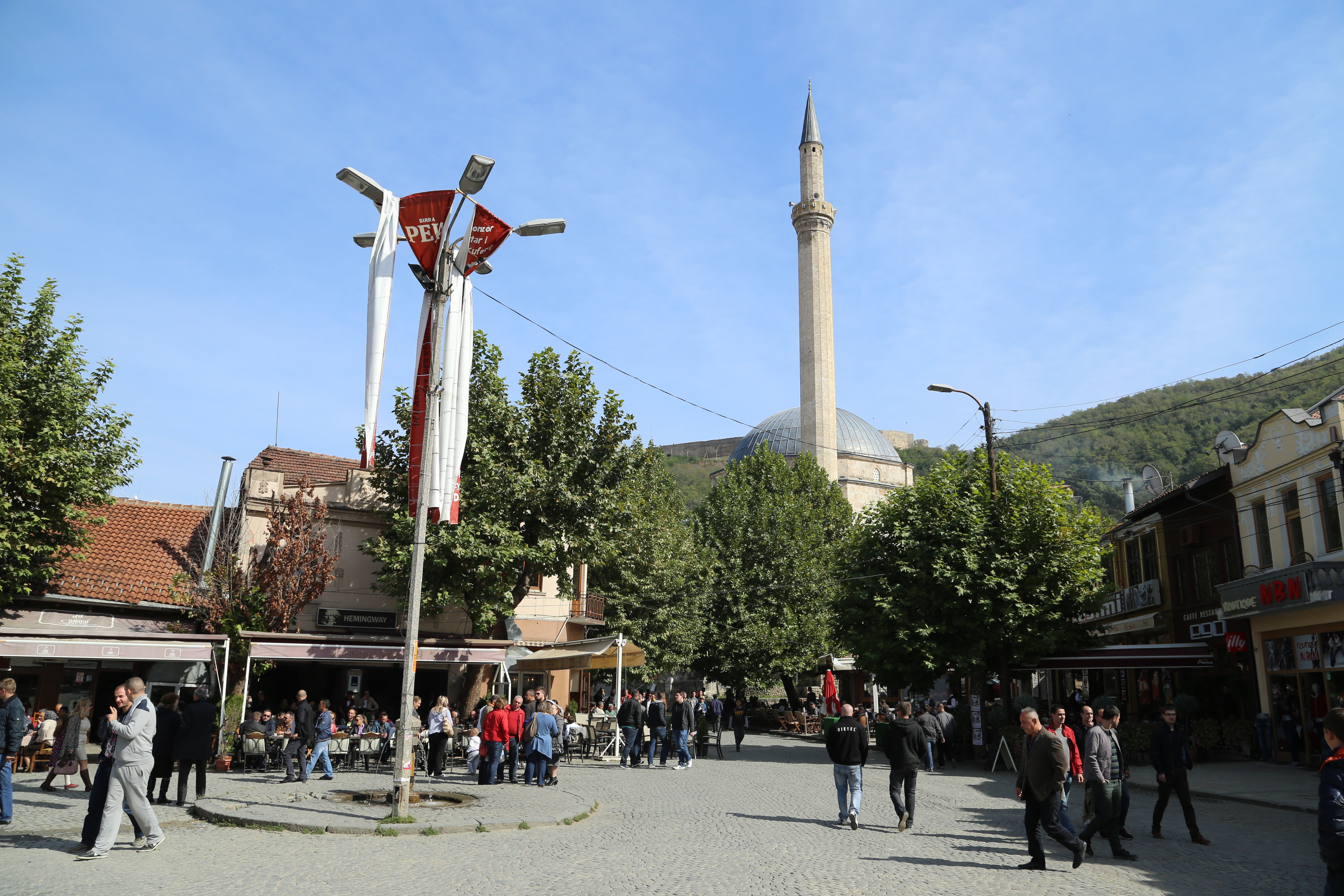
10.06.2013, Prizren, Kosovo

Events in the year 2013 in Kosovo.

== Incumbents ==
- President: Atifete Jahjaga
- Prime Minister: Hashim Thaçi

== Events ==
Ongoing – North Kosovo crisis (2011–2013)

- 19 April – The Brussels Agreement (2013) is signed between representatives of Kosovo and Serbia, ending the two year long North Kosovo crisis. The 15-point document granted devolved powers to North Kosovo regarding economic development, education, healthcare and urban planning, and several mechanisms that allowed a certain autonomy in justice, policing and electoral matters.
- 3 November – Two American missionaries from the Church of Jesus Christ of Latter-day Saints (LDS) were attacked in the nation by a group of known Albanian Islamic terrorists in Pristina. Both missionaries made a full recovery.

== See also ==
- 2013 in Europe
