= Muderiz Ali Effendi Mosque =

Mosque in Prizren, Kosovo

Coordinates: 42.208297°N 20.737899°E

Mosque of Muderis Ali Efendi
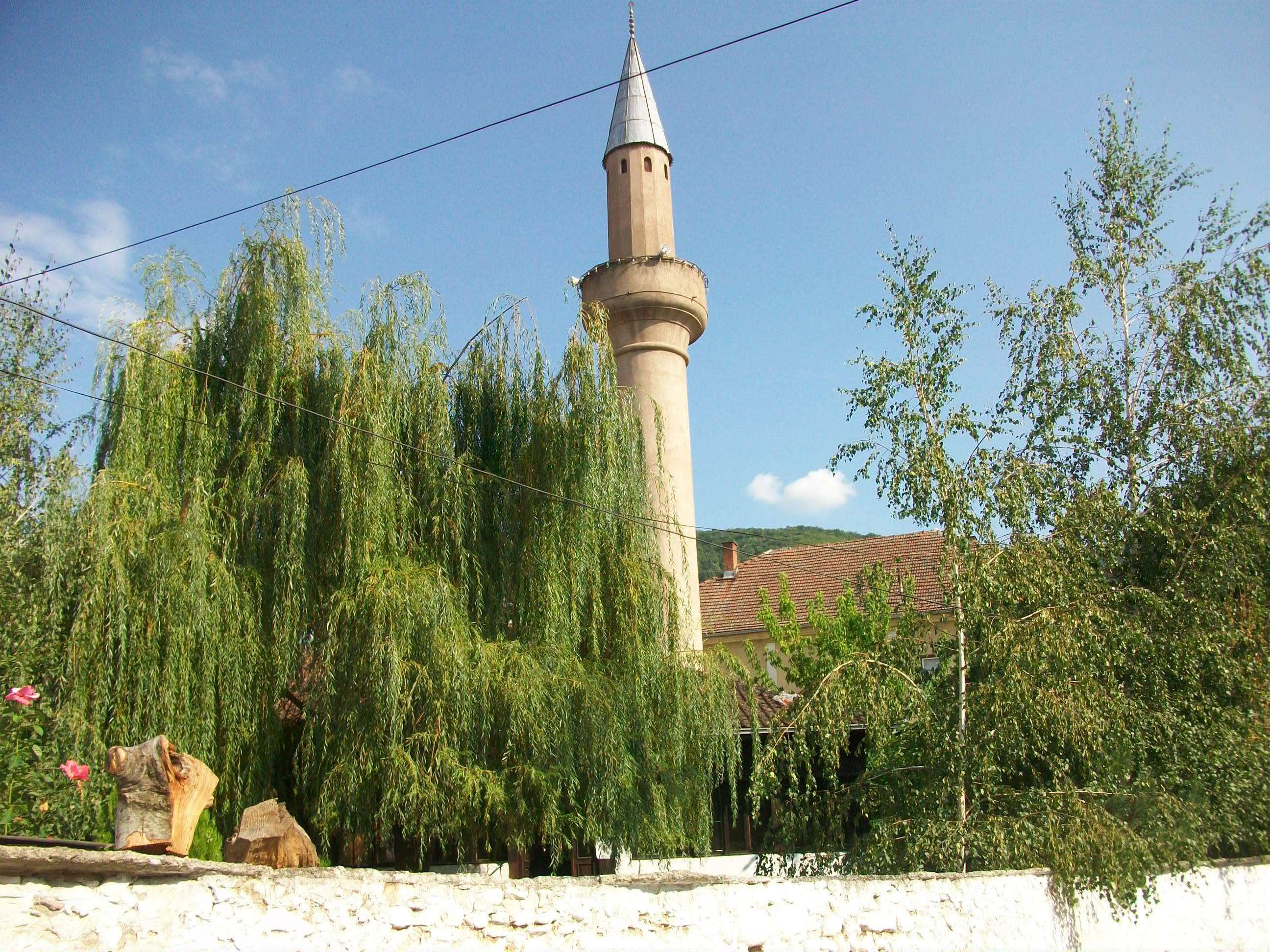

Religion
- Affiliation: Islam
- Ecclesiastical or organisational status: open

Location
- Location: Prizren, Kosovo
- Interactive map of Mosque of Muderis Ali Efendi

Architecture
- Type: Mosque
- Minaret: 1

The Muderis Ali Efendi Mosque (Albanian: Xhamia e Myderis Ali Efendisë; Turkish: Müderris Ali Efendi Camii), also named Mosque of Ali Hoxha (Albanian: Xhamia e Ali Hoxhës), is a mosque in Prizren, Kosovo. Built between 1543 and 1581, it is one of the oldest mosques in Kosovo. It is situated on the street "Rr. Papa Gjon Pali" down the hill from the Catholic Cathedral of Prizren, with its triangle shaped space it occupies 877 m^{2}, it was declared by Prizren Municipality in 1989 as a cultural monument. Its founder, Ali Effendi, who was at that time the Muderis of Prizren is buried in the garden. After World War II it was used as a Red Cross center and was heavily damaged because of improper conduct. In 1963, a fire broke out and further damaged the mosque (according to the city there was a fire in 1975). It is known for its role in the 1905 boycott of Catholic shops in Prizren.

== 1905 boycott ==
The mosque played a central role during the boycott of the Catholic Albanian shops that started in 1905. During this time, the Muslim population didn't engage in any economic activity with Catholic businesses. The cause of this boycott was the alleged finding of a pigs head in the mosque right before the morning prayer. Because the mosque is situated near the Catholic Cathedral of Prizren, people thought that it was a provocation of the Catholic Albanians and in coordination with the main imam took decision to boycott Catholic businesses. It has been later speculated proven that this was a provocation which had been organized by the Serbian rector of the Bogoslovija Orthodox Church School, in order to divide the Albanians who at that time were fighting for the independence from the Ottoman Empire.

== Picture gallery ==
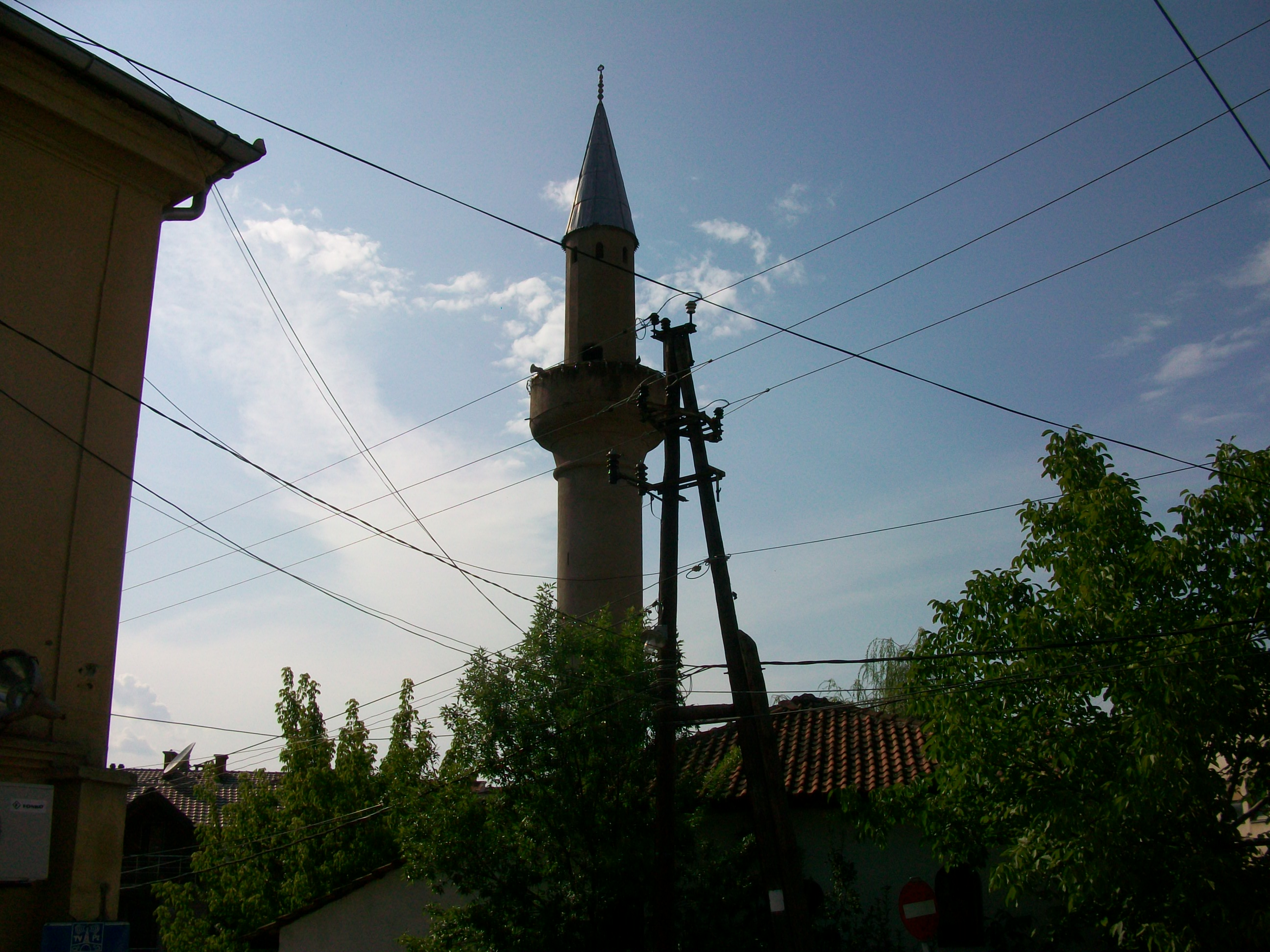

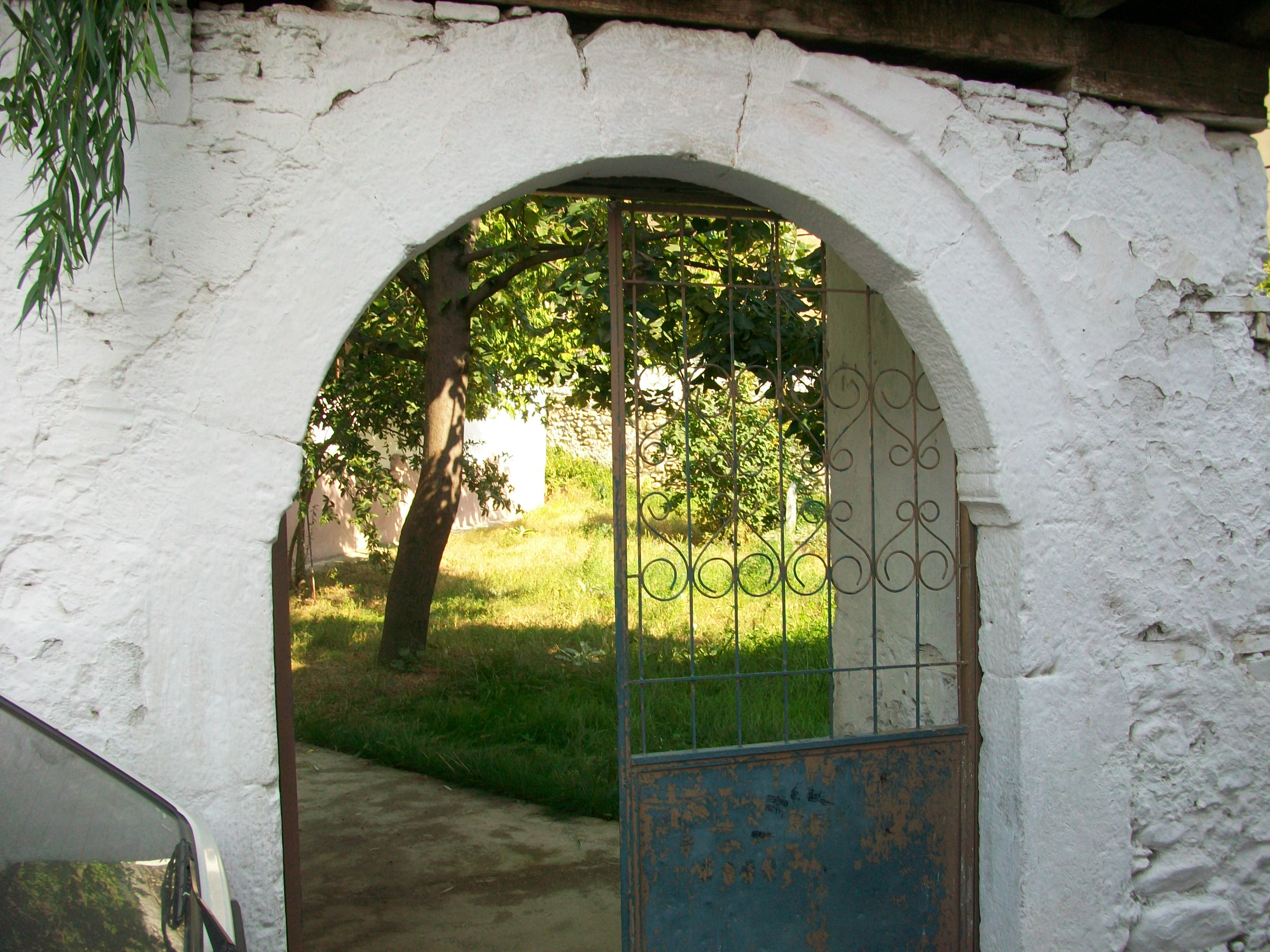

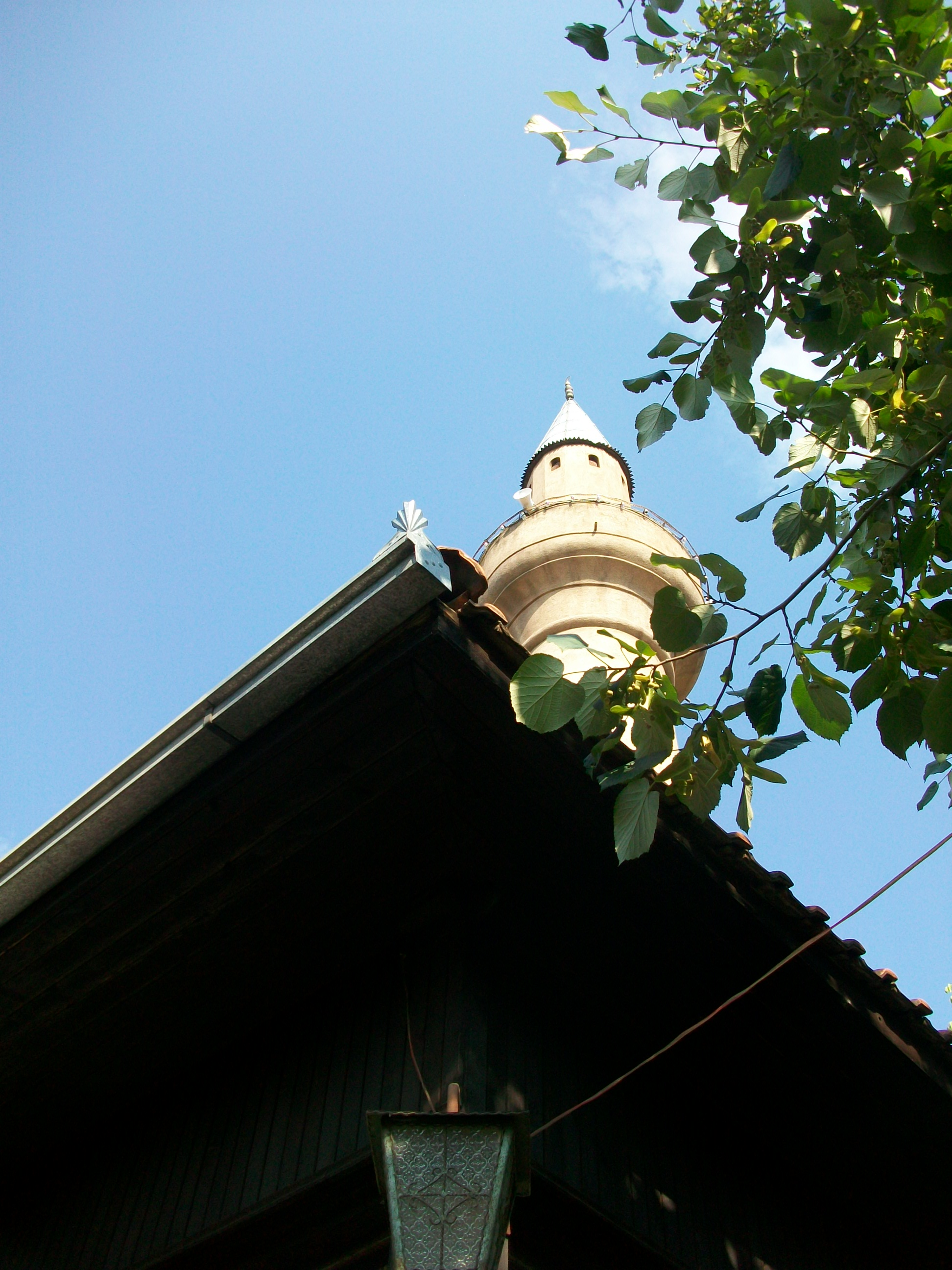

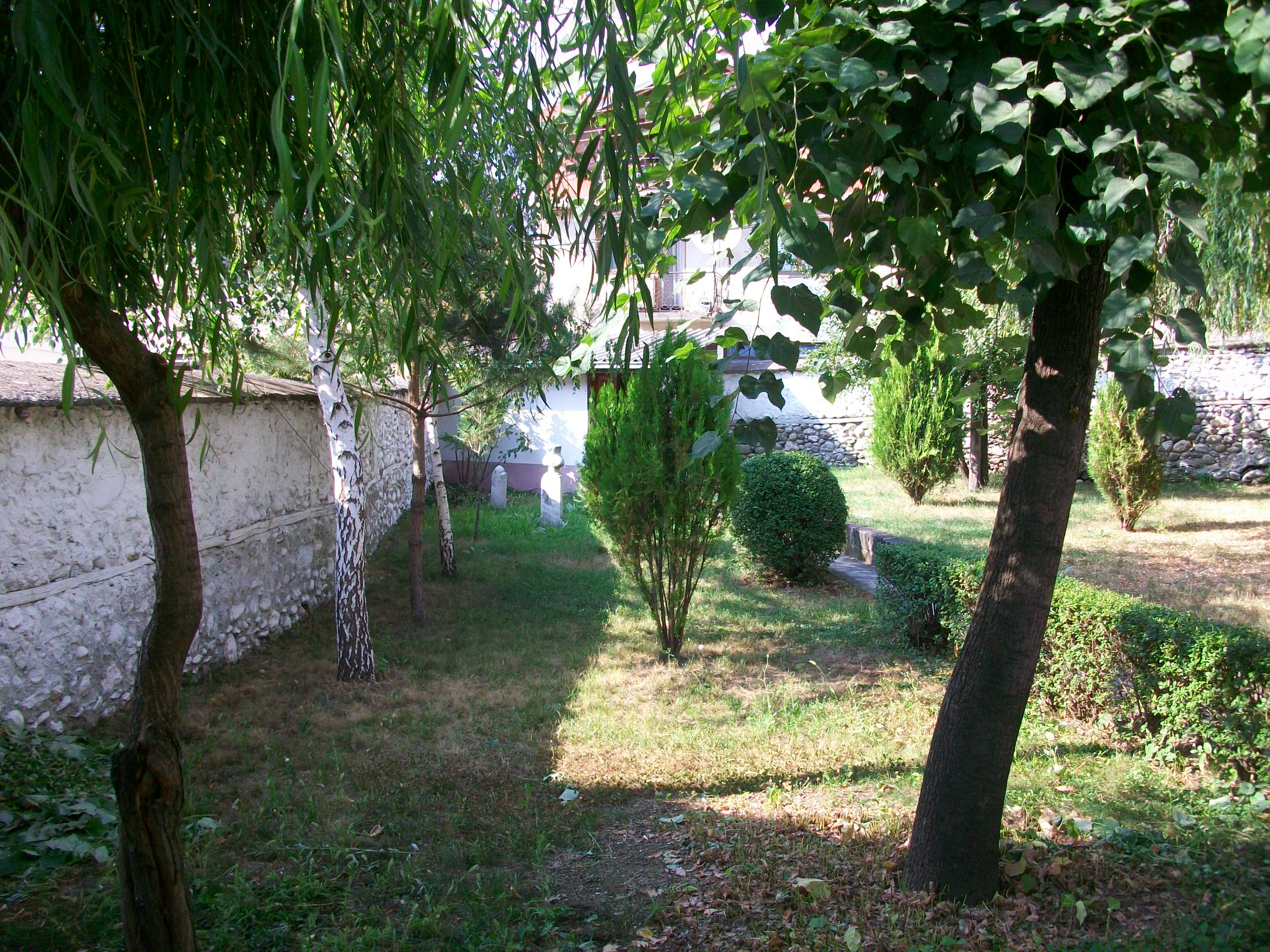

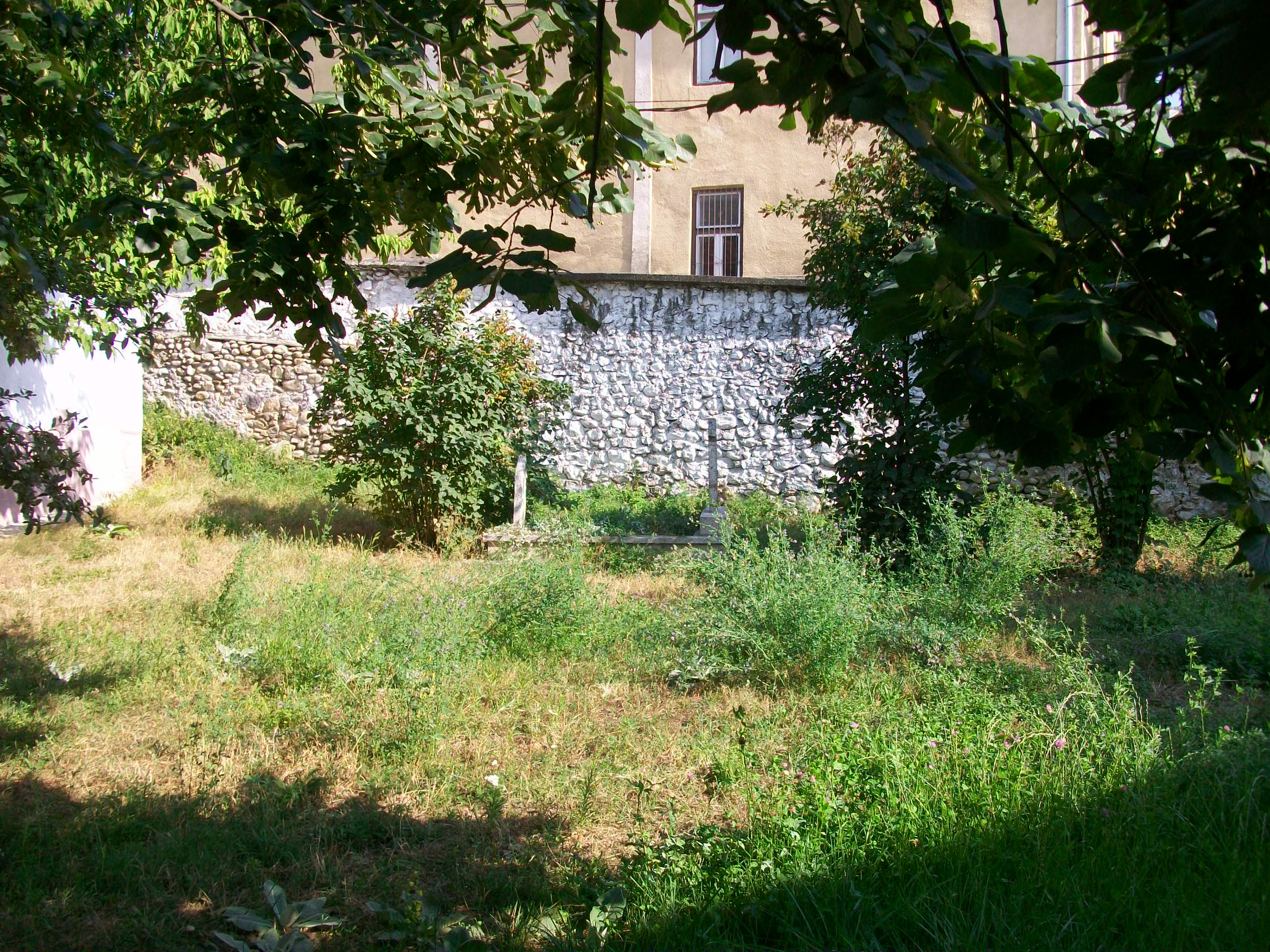

== See also ==
- List of mosques in Kosovo

== Bibliography ==
- https://books.google.com/books?id=GCRjKdrmqqEC Kosovo By Gail Warrander, Verena Knaus
- Historijsko Geografska Analiza urbanih funkcija Prizrena by Dr. Esat Haskuka
- Prizreni i Lashte - Morfologjia e ecurive per ruajtjen e kultures materiale by Muhamed Shukriu
