= 2015 in Kosovo =

- Decades: 1990s; 2000s; 2010s; 2020s
- See also: History of Kosovo; Timeline of Kosovo history; List of years in Kosovo

Events in the year 2015 in Kosovo.

== Incumbents ==
- President: Atifete Jahjaga
- Prime Minister: Isa Mustafa

== Events ==
- 6 January – Anti-government protests begin with a demonstration by "Thirrjet e nënave" ("The call of mothers") at the Serbian Orthodox Church in Gjakova.
- 15 December – Kosovo participated in the Bala Turkvision Song Contest in Istanbul, finishing tenth.

== See also ==
- 2015 in Europe
