= Uglješa =

Uglješa (Serbian: Угљеша) is a Serbian masculine given name. It can also be a surname. It may refer to:

== Given name ==
- Uglješa Bogunović, Serbian architect
- Uglješa Čolić, Serbian politician
- Uglješa Ilić (born 1988), Serbian volleyball player
- Uglješa Kojadinović (1936–1982), actor
- Uglješa Marković, Serbian politician
- Uglješa Mrdić, Serbian politician
- Uglješa Mrnjavčević (1346–1371), medieval nobleman
- Uglješa Radinović (born 1993), footballer
- Uglješa Šajtinac (born 1971), writer
- Uglješa Uzelac, Bosnian politician
- Uglješa Vlatković, medieval nobleman

== Surname ==
- Jovan Uglješa, Serbian nobleman
