= List of years in Kosovo =

This is a list of years in Kosovo. For only articles about years in Kosovo that have been written, see Category:Years in Kosovo.

== 20th century (Pre-Declared Independence) ==
Decades: 1900s · 1910s · 1920s · 1930s · 1940s · 1950s · 1960s · 1970s · 1980s · 1990s

== 21st century (Declared Independence) ==
Decades: 2000s · 2010s · 2020s

2000s: 2008 · 2009

2010s
2010
2011
2012
2013
2014
2015
2016
2017
2018
2019

2020s
2020
2021
2022
2023
2024
2025
2026
