= 2023 in Kosovo =

- Decades: 2000s; 2010s; 2020s
- See also: History of Kosovo; Timeline of Kosovo history; List of years in Kosovo

Events in the year 2023 in Kosovo.

== Incumbents ==
- President: Vjosa Osmani
- Prime Minister: Albin Kurti

== Events ==
Ongoing — COVID-19 pandemic in Kosovo

=== January ===
- 8 January – NATO rejects Serbia's request to deploy up to 1,000 of Serbia's troops and military police in North Kosovo.

=== February ===
- 6 February – PM Albin Kurti agrees to an 11-point normalization agreement aimed at improving relations with Serbia "with caveats", emphasizing the need for international guarantees on Serb self-governance.

=== April ===
- 3 April – Former Kosovo President Hashim Thaci attends his war crimes trial in The Hague.

=== May ===
- 19 May – An ethnic Albanian mayor from Kosovo's ruling party is sworn in for the Serb-majority northern half of Mitrovica, following the Serb boycott of local elections.
- 26 May –
  - Britain, France, Italy, Germany, and the U.S. condemn Kosovo's forced access to municipal buildings in northern Kosovo and urge de-escalation.
  - Police escort ethnic Albanian mayors into offices in northern Kosovo's Serb-majority municipalities, triggering clashes with Serb protesters that led to multiple injuries and heightened Serbian military alert.
- 29 May – Twenty-five peacekeepers of the NATO-led KFOR are injured after clashes with ethnic Serbs in North Kosovo over the installation of ethnic Albanian mayors. Serbian President Aleksandar Vučić places the Serbian Armed Forces on the highest level of combat alert in response to the clashes.

=== June ===
- 3 June – The EU imposes punitive measures on Kosovo for failing to reduce tensions in the north, including exclusion from high-level meetings and suspension of pre-accession funds until 2024.
- 5 June – NATO sends 500 Turkish troops to Kosovo after clashes injured nearly 40 peacekeepers; NATO then calls for peace talks and increases its presence.
- 13 June – Kosovo proposed new elections and reducing special police. An arrest of a Serb linked to attacks on KFOR sparks further protests.
- 14 June – Serbian forces detain three Kosovo Police officers, accusing them of illegally crossing the border. Kosovan Prime Minister Albin Kurti denies the Serbian claims, saying that the officers were arrested 300 metres inside Kosovan territory, and demands their immediate release.

=== July ===
- 28-30 July – The 7th Meeting of Styles International Street Art & Graffiti festival is held in Pristina, featuring over 100 artists and focusing on the theme "Critical Mass".

=== September ===
- 24 September – Banjska attack: One police officer is killed and another is injured during an ambush on their patrol in North Kosovo, near the border with Serbia.

=== October ===
- 4 October – Serbia releases Kosovo Serb leader Milan Radoicic from custody with travel restrictions, sparking condemnation from Kosovo officials.
- 17 October – EU Special Representative Miroslav Lajčák, US envoy Gabriel Escobar, and advisors from France, Germany, and Italy meet with Serbia and Kosovo to reinforce commitment to normalization.

== See also ==
- 2023 in Europe
- COVID-19 pandemic in Europe
