= Uglješa Ilić =

Serbian volleyball player

Personal information
- Full name: Uglješa Ilić
- Nationality: (Serbia) Serbian
- Born: August 4, 1988 (age 38) Aranđelovac, SR Serbia, SFR Yugoslavia
- Height: 201 cm (6 ft 7 in)
- Weight: 104 kg (229 lb)
- Spike: 350 cm (140 in)
- Block: 338 cm (133 in)

Volleyball information
- Position: Opposite
- Number: 11

Uglješa Ilić (Serbian Cyrillic: Угљеша Илић, born 4 August 1988) is a Serbian volleyball player. He is 201 cm tall, and he is playing as an opposite.

== Clubs ==
Club	Country	-Year
OK Crvena Zvezda	(Serbia)	2006—2009
Spartak Ljig	(Serbia)	2009—2010
Mladi Radnik	(Serbia)	2010—2011
Novi Sad	(Serbia)	2011—2012
Volley Nafels	(Switzerland)	2012—2013
OK Radnički Kragujevac	(Serbia)	2013—2014
C.S. Unirea Dej	(Romania)	2014—2015
OK Radnički Kragujevac	(Serbia)	2015—2016
VK Spartak UJS Komarno	(Slovakia)	2016—2017
