= Xhevdet Bajraj =

Kosovar poet and screenwriter (1960–2022)

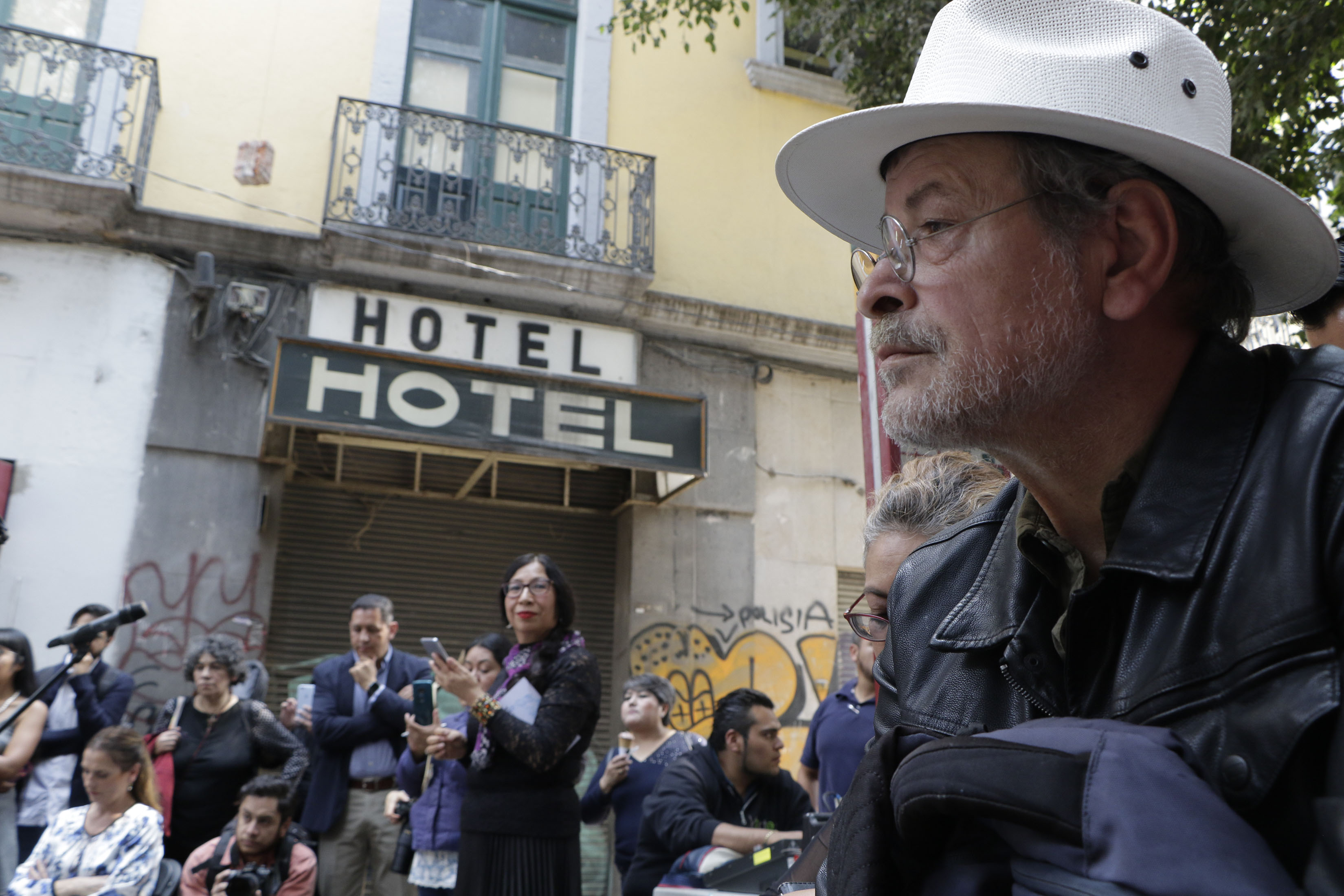
Bajraj at a public poetry reading in Mexico City

Xhevdet Bajraj (Serbo-Croat: Dževdet Bajraj; 6 March 1960 – 22 June 2022) was an ethnic Albanian Kosovar poet and screenwriter who resided in Mexico.

== Biography ==
Born in Panorc, Kosovo , Bajraj was granted residency in Mexico as a refugee thanks to the International Parliament of Writers that offered him the options of France, Italy or Mexico. He fled the war in the Kosovo for a more peaceful Mexico City where he resided with his wife (a physician) and two children.

Bajraj died on 22 June 2022 in Mexico City due to a brain tumor.

== Books ==
- El tamaño del dolor ("The size of the pain", 2005)
- Ruego albanés ("Albanian plea", 2000)
- Slaying the Mosquito, 2017

== Screenplays ==
- Aro Tolbukhin, en la mente del asesino ("Aro Tolbukin, in the mind of the assassin", 2002)

== See also ==
- Mexican literature
- Cinema of Mexico
