= Kosovo Independence Day =

National independence day in Kosovo

Kosovo Independence Day Albanian: Dita e Pavarësisë së Kosovës
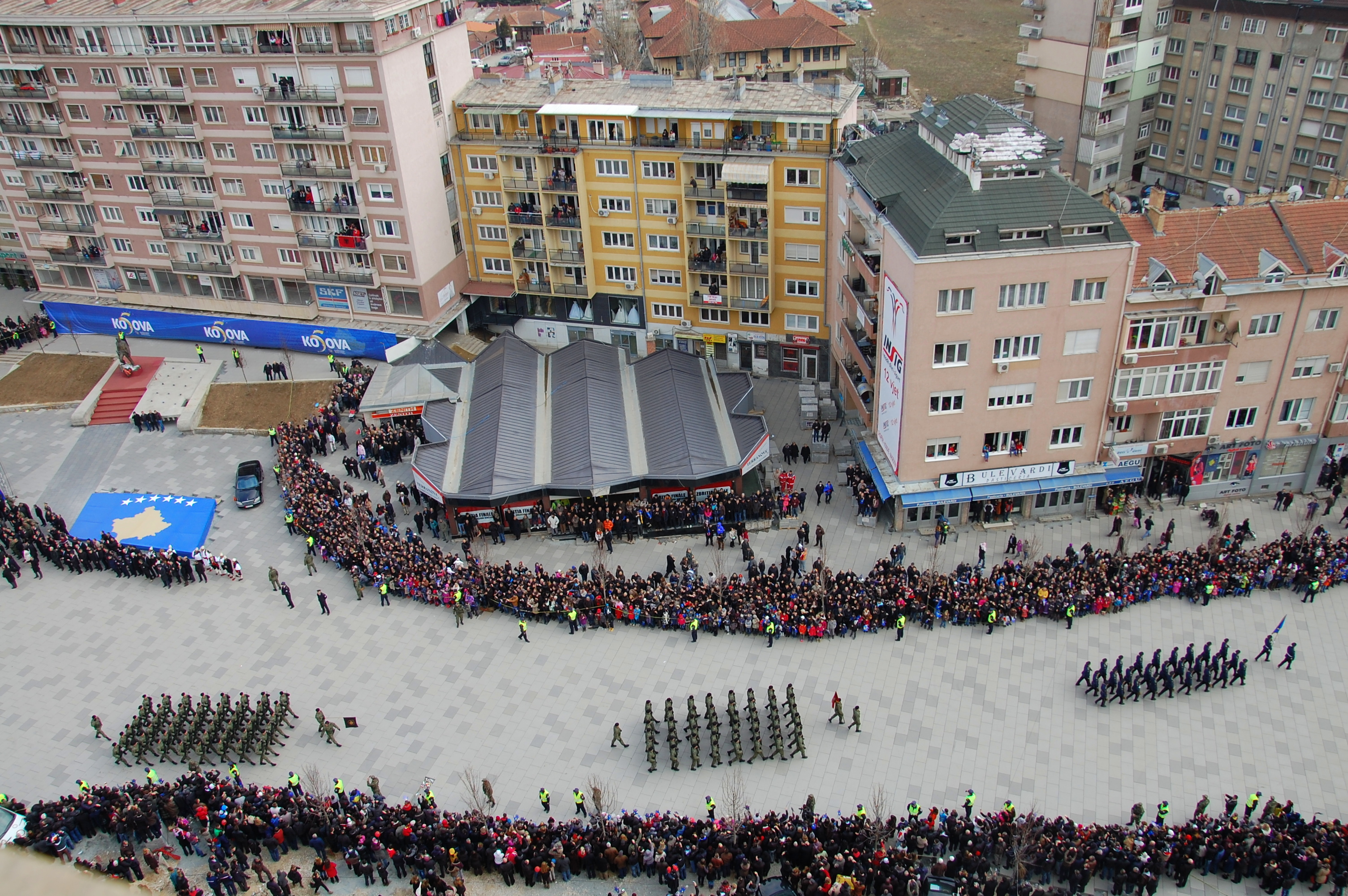
- Kosovo Independence Day parade, 2013
- Observed by: Kosovo
- Significance: Marks Kosovo's declaration of independence in 2008
- Date: 17 February
- Next time: 17 February 2026
- Frequency: Annual

Kosovo Independence Day (Albanian: Dita e Pavarësisë së Kosovës) is a national independence day celebrated in Kosovo every year on 17 February, marking the anniversary of Kosovo's declaration of independence on 17 February 2008.

== Background ==
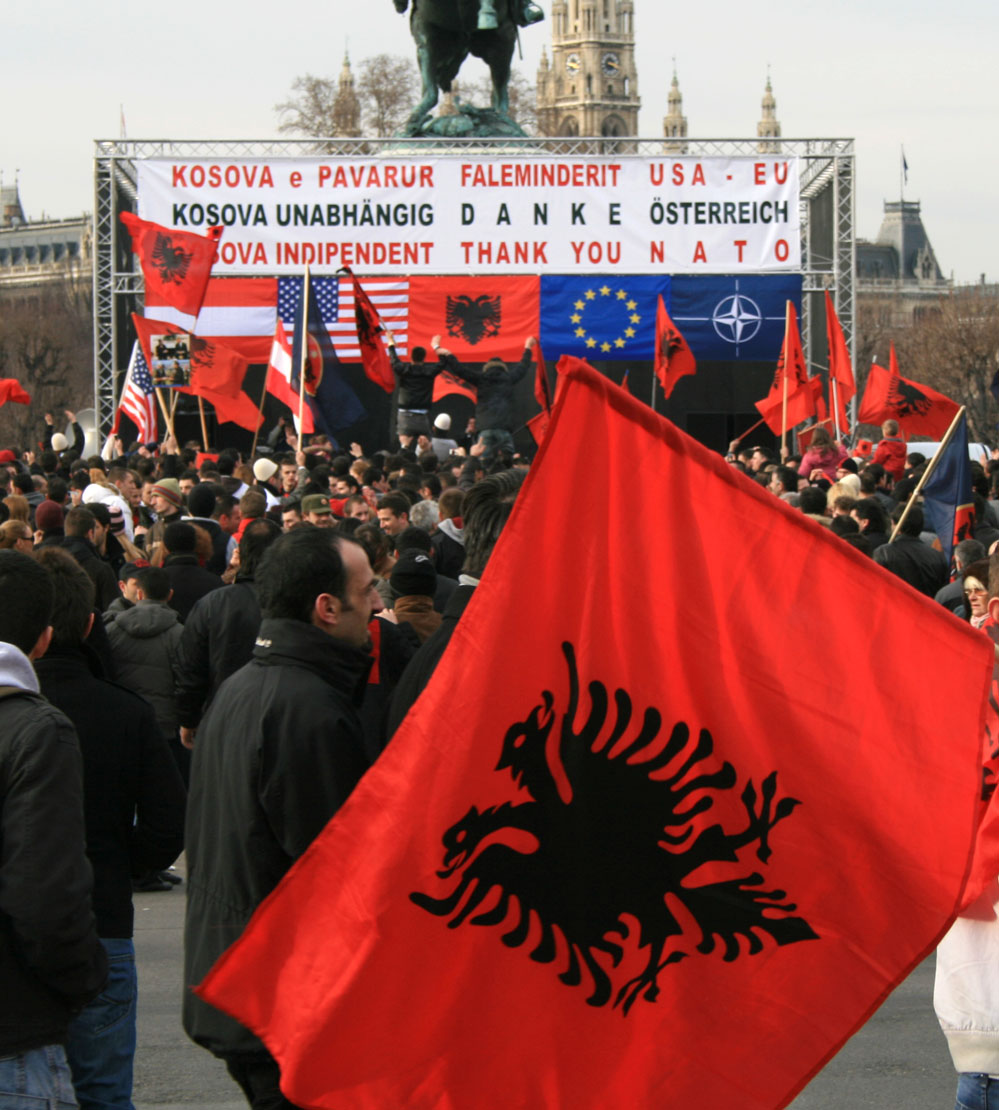
Celebration of the declaration of independence of Kosovo in Vienna, Austria

Kosovo is the second youngest country in the world (behind South Sudan which declared independence in 2011) and the youngest country in Europe to have been recognized (partially by over 100 UN member states). After a 2008 referendum, Kosovo declared independence on 17 February 2008. Despite this, Serbia still refuses to recognise Kosovo as a sovereign state, disapproving of the nation's partial international recognition as an independent state, a stance backed by Russia, India and China, among others. After the controversy, the International Court of Justice (ICJ) ruled on 22 July 2010 that Kosovo’s independence was not in violation of international law.

== See also ==
- Statehood Day (Serbia)
- Independence Day (Albania)
- International recognition of Kosovo
