= Cathedral of Our Lady of Perpetual Succour (Prizren) =

Katedralja e Zojës Ndihmëtare
- Precinct of the Lady Helper
- Cathedral of Our Lady of Perpetual Succor
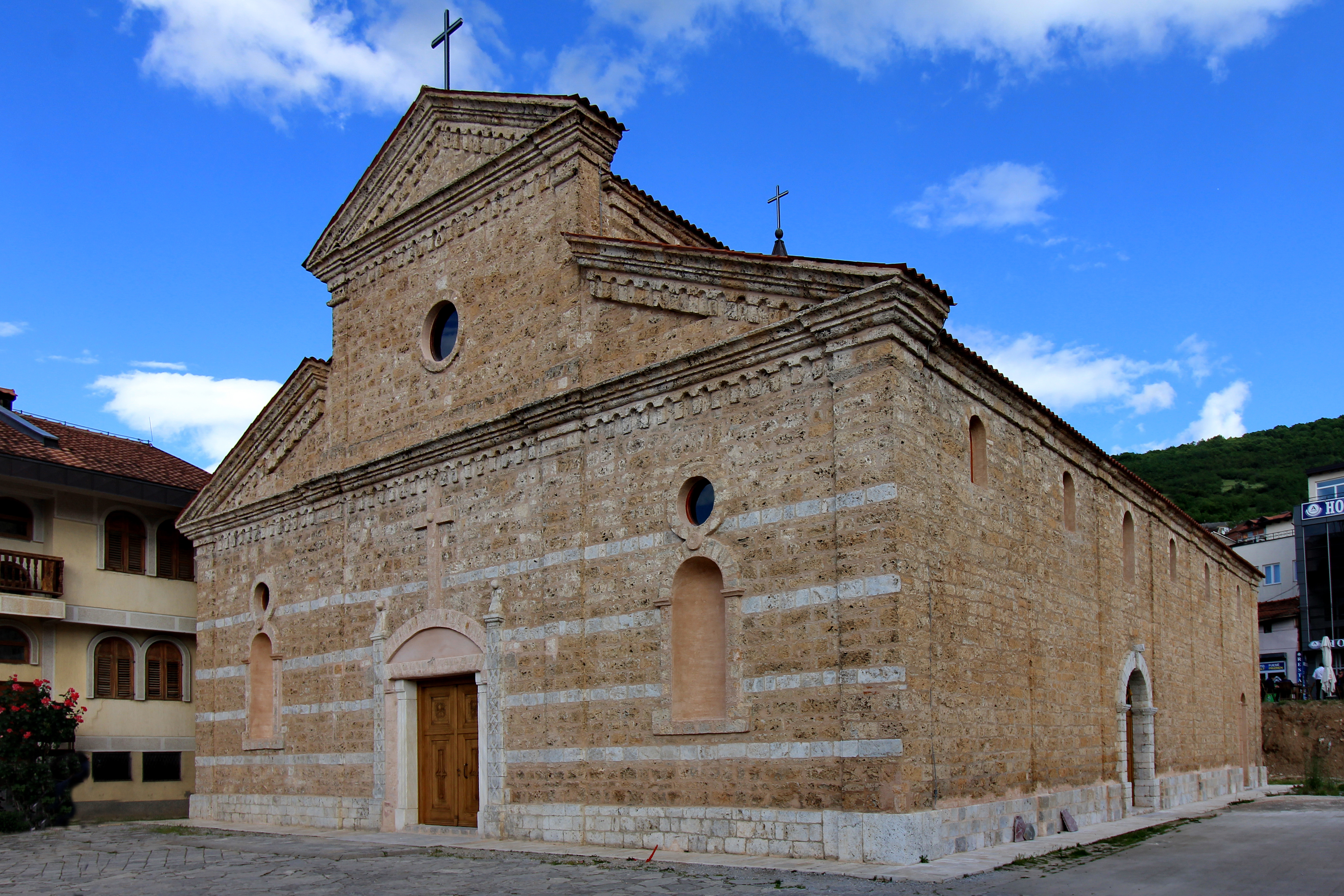
- The front façade of the cathedral, facing east
- Katedralja e Zojës Ndihmëtare
- Country: Kosovo
- Denomination: Catholic

History
- Consecrated: 1870

Architecture
- Heritage designation: Cultural Monument

Administration
- Diocese: Roman Catholic Diocese of Prizren-Pristina

Cultural Heritage under Permanent Protection
- Official name: Kompleksi i Kishës Katolike Zonja Ndihmëtare
- Type: Architectural Heritage: Monument/Ensemble
- Reference no.: 403

The Cathedral of Our Lady of Perpetual Succour (Note: Albanian: Katedralja Katolike e Zojës Ndihmëtare, Serbian: Католичка катедрала Госпе Помоћнице, Katolička katedrala Gospe Pomoćnice) also known as Precinct of the Lady Helper Church and Con-cathedral of the Lady Helper is a Roman Catholic cathedral in Prizren, Kosovo. It is the seat of the Roman Catholic Diocese of Prizren-Pristina.

== History ==
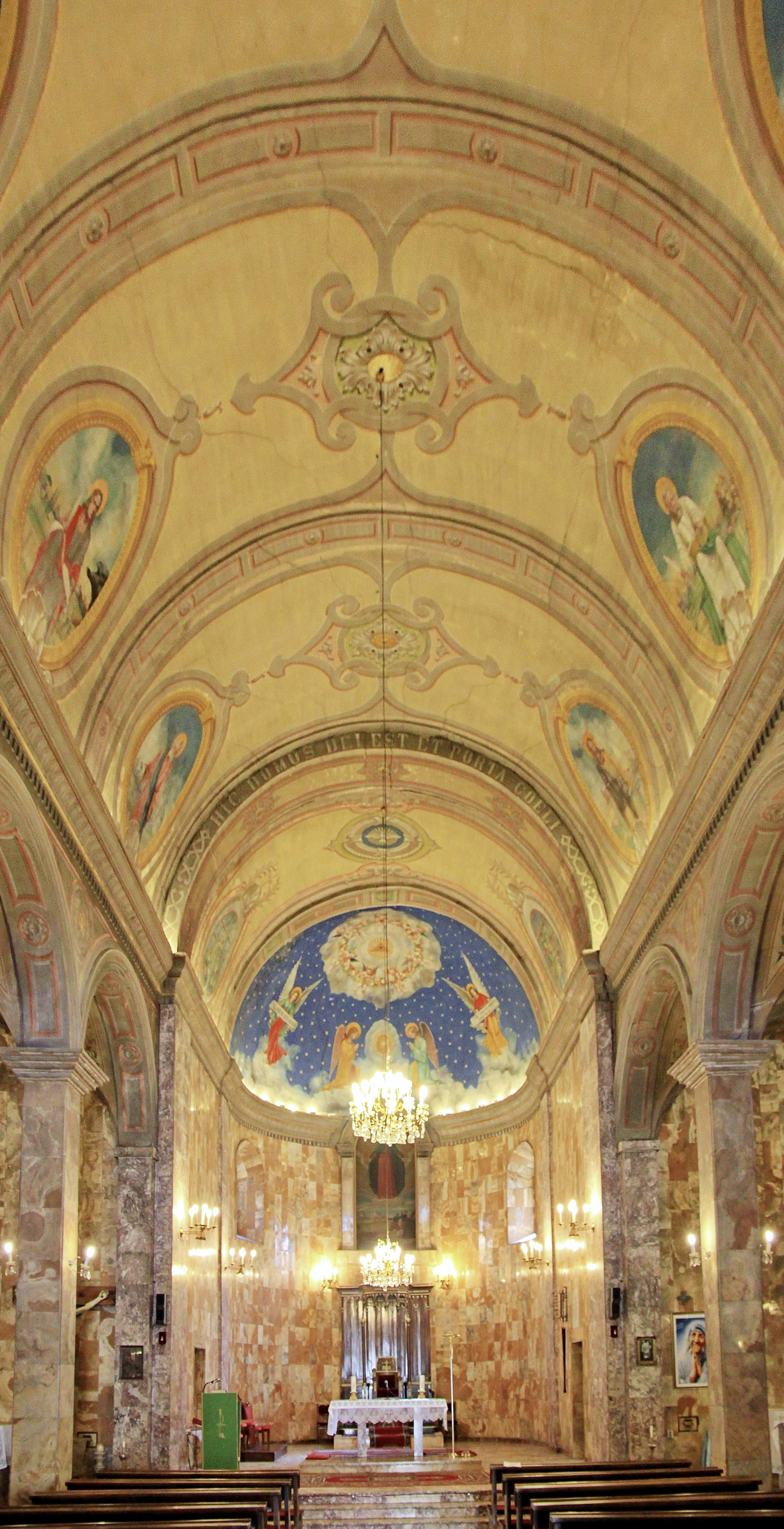
Interior view

The Cathedral was commissioned by Italian Dario Bucciarelli, Archbishop of Skopje, in 1870 who had worked as a missionary in Albania for 9 years and had been secretary to the Archbishop of Shkodër. During that time, it was financed by citizens of Dubrovnik. However, the site was likely a graveyard church dating back to the 5th century, uncovered during excavations carried out between 2019 and 2021. These excavations also revealed the presence of the walls of a 12th-century church in the foundations of the current building.

The cathedral was not dedicated until October 31, 1970, one hundred years after its construction.

== Architecture ==
The cathedral is built on a basilic plan with three naves, in a neoclassical style. The primary construction material is brick, with decorative stone bands on the facade. Vertical columns, stairs and the balcony are made of wood. The primary interior material is marble, since a restoration in 1970.
