= Timeline of Kosovo history =

This is a timeline containing events regarding the history of Kosovo.

== Prehistory, Roman era – 13th century AD ==
- 5500–4500 BC: The Neolithic archaeological culture of Vinča occupied a large area of Central Balkans.
- 4th century BC: The establishment of the Dardanian Kingdom.
- 393 – 358 - The reign of Bardyllis in Dardania.
- 335 – 295 - (approximately) The reign of Cleitus the Illyrian (the son of Bardyllis) in Dardania.
- 295 – 290 – The reign of Bardylis II in Dardania.
- 231 – 206 – The reign of Longarus in Dardania.
- 206 – 176 – The reign of Bato of Dardania.
- 2nd century BC: The Roman Empire conquered Illyria in 168 BC. The Central Balkans was prior to the Roman conquest held by Illyrians, Thracians and Celts, while the Kosovo region was specifically inhabited by the Triballi, a Thracian tribe.
- 87–27 BC: The Dardani settled in the southwest of Triballi area in 87BC. The Dardani were possibly an Illyro-Thracian. Dardanians were defeated by Gaius Scribonius Curio and the Latin language was soon adopted as the main language of the tribe as many other conquered and Romanised. Eastern Dardania was Thracian throughout Roman rule. The Thracian place names survives the Romanization of the region.
- 6–9 – The great Great Illyrian Revolt against the Roman Empire
- 2nd century AD:
  - Ulpiana (later Byzantine Justiniana Secunda) is founded, most likely during the rule of Trajan. It was settled by Roman legionaries of unknown descent. The Romans colonised and founded several cities in the region.
  - Florus and Laurus, Constantinopolitan twin brothers that worked as stonemasons, are killed together with 300 fellow Christians after building a Church on the site of a Greek temple in Ulpiana. They were proclaimed Christians martyrs.
- 284: Emperor Diocletian established Dardania into a separate province out of territory of Moesia Superior with its capital at Naissus (Niš). However, in Ptolemy's Geographia (written in the 2nd century), Dardania is a separate unit.
- 4th century:
  - 325: Bishops from Dardania and Macedonia Salutaris attend the Council of Nicaea, to deal with the Arian heresy.
  - 343–344: Bishops from Dardania, New Epirus and Old Epirus attend the Council of Sardica.
- 5th century:
  - Christianity begins to spread throughout the region.
- 441: Invasion of Huns into Illyria.
  - 479: Ulpiana is destroyed. King Theodemir sent his son Theodoric the Great with 3,000 soldiers to destroy the city.
- 6th century:
  - 517: A "great barbarian incursion".
  - 518: Earthquake, destroying 24 strongholds in Dardania.
  - fl. 535–565: Emperor Justinian I (r. 527–565) rebuilt Ulpiana, naming it Justiniana Secunda after founding Justiniana Prima in 535.
  - Slavs are mentioned in the Balkans during Justinian I rule (527–565), when eventually up to 100,000 Slavs raided Thessalonica. The Balkans were settled with "Sclaveni", in relation to the Antes which settled in Eastern Europe. Large scale Slavic settlement in the Balkans begins in the early 580s. The Slavs lived in the Sklavinia (lit. Slav lands).
- fl. 893–927: the church in Sočanica is, at latest, built during the reign of Bulgar Simeon I. It was in use in the 11th and 12th centuries according to grave finds. In the reign of Grand Prince Uroš II, the site was known as Sečenica and was defended from the Byzantines from the newly built fortress at Galič, protecting the bridge over Ibar and the road to Ras. The site draws continuity with municipium Dardanorum.
- ca 960: Constantine VII writes the De Administrando Imperio, in which "Serbia" has the city of Dresneïk, among others. possibly modern Drsnik, in Metohija.
- ca 1090: Serbian Grand Prince Vukan (r. 1083–1112) began raiding Byzantine territory, first in the vicinity of Kosovo.
- Between 1166 and 1168: Nemanja, a Serbian royalty who held parts of Kosovo and southern Serbia proper, defeats his older brother and Serbian Grand Prince Tihomir at Pantino (south of Zvečan), usurping the throne.
- 13th century:
  - between 1217 and 1235: The Peć metoh is founded by Saint Sava.
  - 1253: the Serbian see was transferred from Žiča to the Monastery of Peć (future Patriarchate) by Archbishop Arsenije after a Hungarian invasion. The Serbian primates had since moved between the two.
  - In 1289–1290, the chief treasures of the ruined Žiča monastery, including the remains of Saint Jevstatije I, were transferred to Peja.

== 14th century ==
- 1306: Our Lady of Ljeviš-monastery (UNESCO item) is built in Prizren by King Stephen Uroš II Milutin of Serbia (r. 1282–1321).
- 1315: Church of Virgin Hodegetria is built in Mušutište by kaznac Jovan Dragoslav.
- between 1313 and 1317: Banjska monastery and St. Stephen's church are built in Banjska, near Zvečan, by King Stephen Uroš II Milutin of Serbia (r. 1282–1321).
- 1321: Gračanica monastery (UNESCO item) is built in Gračanica by King Stephen Uroš II Milutin.
- 1325: First mention of Albanians in the region of Kosovo by Venetian Marino Sanudo.
- 1327:
  - Zočište Monastery is mentioned in Orahovac (thought to be built in the 12th century).
  - The building of Visoki Dečani-monastery (UNESCO item) begins in Peja (finished 1335), by King Stephen Uroš III Dečanski of Serbia (r. 1322–1331).
- 1330: The St. Saviour Church is built.
- between 1322 and 1331: Gorioč monastery is built in Istok, by King Stephen Uroš III Dečanski who also defeats the Bulgarians at Kyustendl (1330).
- 1331: St. Nicholas Church, at the centre of Prizren, is built.
- 1343 -47 – Stephen Uroš IV Dušan of Serbia invades Albania.
- 1346–1371: Prizren acts as capital of the Serbian Empire.
- 1345: King of Serbia Stefan Dušan around Christmas 1345. at a council meeting in Serres, which was conquered on 25 September 1345, proclaimed himself "Tsar of the Serbs and Romans" (Romans is equivalent to Greeks in Serbian documents). The Serbian Orthodox Church becomes the Serbo-Greek Imperial Patriarchate, its spiritual capital being in Kosovo (Patriarchal Monastery of Peć).
- 1347: The Saint Archangels Monastery is founded by Emperor Dušan.
- 1352: As allies of Byzantine emperor John VI Kantakouzenos, the Ottomans defeat the Serbs at Didymoteicho.
- between 1331 and 1355: Kmetovce monastery is built in Kmetovce, near Gnjilane, by Emperor Dušan.
- 1355: Emperor Dušan dies and Stefan Uroš V of Serbia assumes the throne of the Serbian Empire. Simeon Uroš declares himself the rival Emperor in Thessaly.
- 1365: Prizren becomes part of King Vukašin's domain.
- 1371:
  - 26 September: The Battle of Maritsa against the Ottoman Empire, results in a defeat, in which Vukašin and Uglješa are killed.
  - 4 December: Emperor Uroš V dies. The Nemanjić dynasty is left without an heir, and the Serbian Empire fragments into a conglomeration of principalities.
  - Lazar Hrebeljanović, a Serbian magnate, becomes the most powerful of Serbian nobles. He conquers Priština, while his subordinate Đurađ I Balšić takes Prizren, which were held by Marko, the son of Vukašin. Lazar was born in Novo Brdo.
- 1372: Đurađ I Balšić takes Peja, stripping most of Marko's lands north of Šar mountain.
- 1375: In 1375 the Serbian Patriarch was forced to send a delegation to Constantinopole to appeal for the lifting of the schism from the Serbian Patriarchate of Peć that was established during the time of Dušan. In the last decade of the 14th century, Macedonia was already under Ottoman rule.
- 1378: Vuk Branković, a subordinate to Lazar, holds all of modern Kosovo after the death of Đurađ I Balšić.
- 1381: Draganac monastery in Prilepac is mentioned in edicts of Lazar.
- 1389:
  - 28 June [O.S. 15 June]: At the Kosovo field, the Serbian army led by Prince Lazar and Duke Vlatko Vuković fights the larger Ottoman army at the Battle of Kosovo. Casualties on both sides were extremely high – both leaders Lazar and Ottoman sultan Murad I died, together with most of the Serbian aristocracy. The southern provinces of the Serbian Empire were now in Ottoman hands, save for the Central Serbia, Montenegro and Bosnia, which would soon follow. The Battle has a notable place in Serbian history and culture.
  - 1389: Stefan Lazarević, the son of Lazar, succeeds as Prince (1389–1402) (see Serbian Despotate).
- 1392: The Ottomans capture Skoplje (renaming it Üsküp). Vuk Branković, remembered in epic tradition as a traitor who slipped away from the Battle of Kosovo, was forced to become their vassal. Stefan Lazarević followed suit.
- 1394: Stefan Lazarević participated in the Battle of Karanovasa as an Ottoman vassal.
- 1395: Stefan Lazarević participated in the Battle of Rovine as an Ottoman vassal. Vuk Branković refused to participate.
- 1396: The Battle of Nicopolis in 1396, widely regarded as the last large-scale crusade of the Middle Ages, failed to stop the advance of the victorious Ottomans. Vuk Branković refused to participate, and Bayezid I soon takes his lands and gives it to the Lazarević family, forcing Vuk to flee.
- 6 October 1397: Vuk Branković dies in exile.

== 15th century ==
- 1402: Stefan Lazarević, Prince (r. 1389–1402), assumes the title of Despot (r. 1402–1427). This took place after the Ottoman state temporarily collapsed following Mongol emir Timur's invasion of Anatolia (Battle of Ankara). The Ottoman interregnum lasted until 1413, as Bayezid's sons fought over succession.
- 1402: In the feud between Ottoman vassal Đurađ Branković and his uncle Despot Stefan, Đurađ II Balšić sided with Stefan. Due to Đurađ II's support, Stefan defeated Ottoman forces led by Branković in the battle of Gračanica on the Kosovo field (21 June 1402).
- 1412 After the battle of Angora in 1402, Prince Stefan took advantage of the chaos in the Ottoman state. In Constantinople he received the title of despot, and upon returning home, having defeated Brankovic's relatives he took control over the lands of his father. Despite frequent internal conflicts and his vassal obligations to the Turks and Hungarians, despot Stefan revived and economically consolidated the Serbian state, the centre of which was gradually moving northward. Under his rule Novo Brdo in Kosovo became the economic centre of Serbia where in he issued a Law of Mines in 1412.
- 1412: Stefan Lazarević issued a Code of Mines in 1412 in Novo Brdo, the economic centre of Serbia. In his legacy, Resava-Manasija monastery (Pomoravlje District), he organised the Resava School, a centre for correcting, translating, and transcribing books.
- 1413, 5 July: Musa Çelebi is killed, ending the Ottoman Interregnum with Mehmed Çelebi emerging as Sultan.
- 1427 Stefan Lazarević died suddenly in 1427, leaving the throne to his nephew Đurađ Branković.
- 1430 The whole of Macedonia was conquered by the Ottomans.
- 1443, the Ottoman army was defeated, at the Serbian town of Niš, by a crusade under a multi-national leadership which included the Hungarian hero János Hunyadi. At this point Skanderbeg, an Albanian nobleman who had been trained as a soldier in the Ottoman army, raised a rebellion from his family seat at Kruja.
- 1448 Battle of Kosovo (1448).
- 1453 Fall of Constantinople in 1453.
- Between 1455 and 1459: Ottoman conquest of the Serbian Despotate. Prizren is conquered in 1455. The Monastery of the Holy Archangels is looted and destroyed. The Ottoman Sanjak of Prizren is established, existing until 1912.
- After 1455: Building of Namazgah Mosque.
- 1455 Building of Xhumasë Mosque.

== 16th century ==
- ca 1500: Building of "Maksut Pasha"-mosque, near the Marrash section just across the bridge. The bridge is still in use.
- 1513: Building of Mosque "Suzi Prizreni" in Prizren.
- 1526: Building of Mosque "Haxhi Kasami" at the Prizren fortress.
- 1526: Building of Mosque of Haxhi Kasëmi (Toska), built between 1526 and 1533.
- 1526: Building of Mosque of Jakup be Evrenozi.

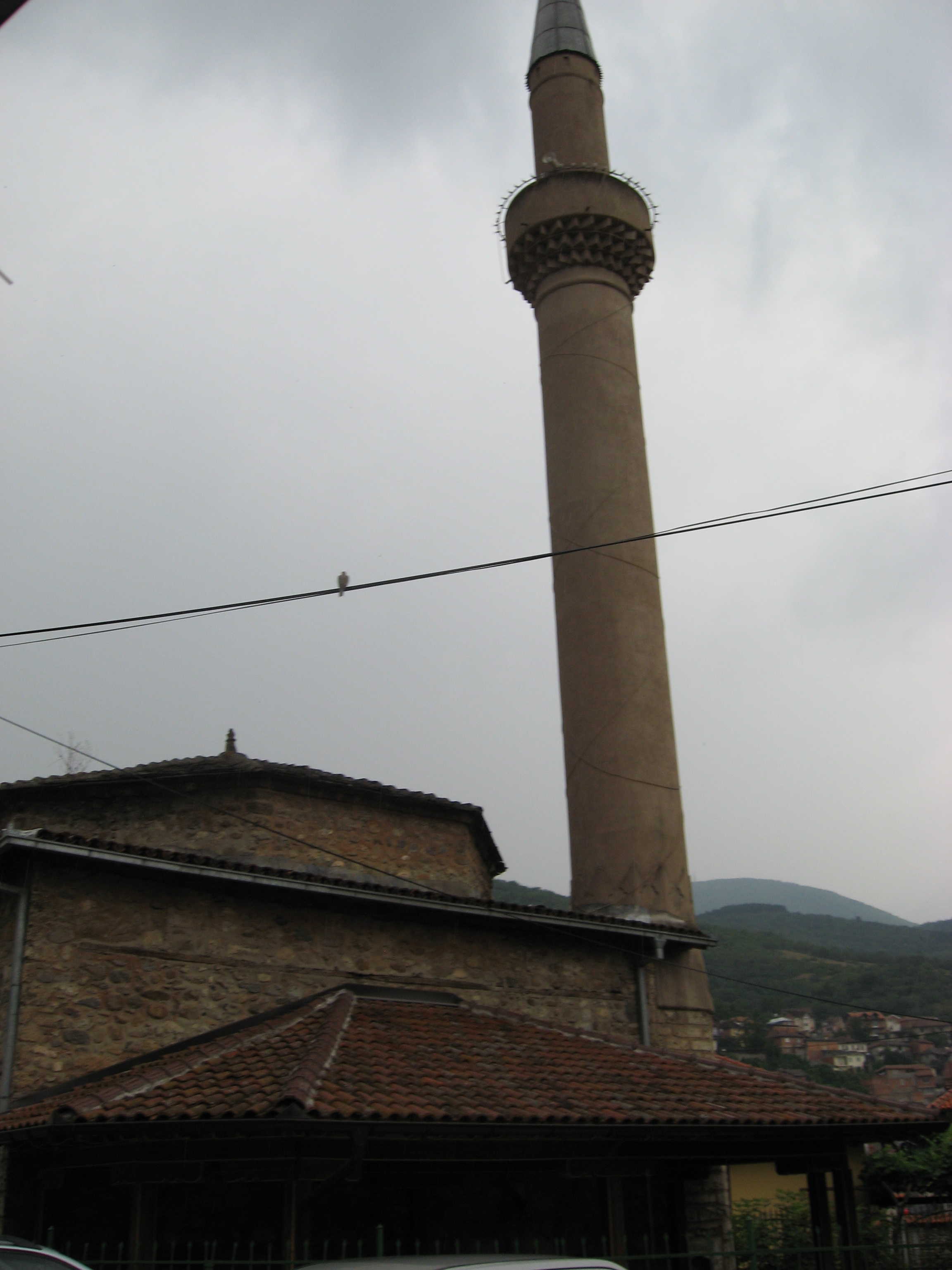
Mosque of Kuklibeu

- 1534: (or 1543) Building of Mosque of Kuklibeu Albanian: Xhamia e Kuklibeut also known as Kukli Bej Mosque (Xhamia e Saraçhanes/Sarachane) Kukli Beu Mosque or Kukli Bej's Mosque, Mosque from Mehmet Kukli Beg/Mehmeda Kuklji bega, Serbian: Kukli – begova (Saračana) džamija/Kuklji Beg dzamije.
- 1534: (1534?) Building of "Iljaz Kukës"-Mosque in Prizren.
- 1538: Mosque of the new neighborhood 1538.

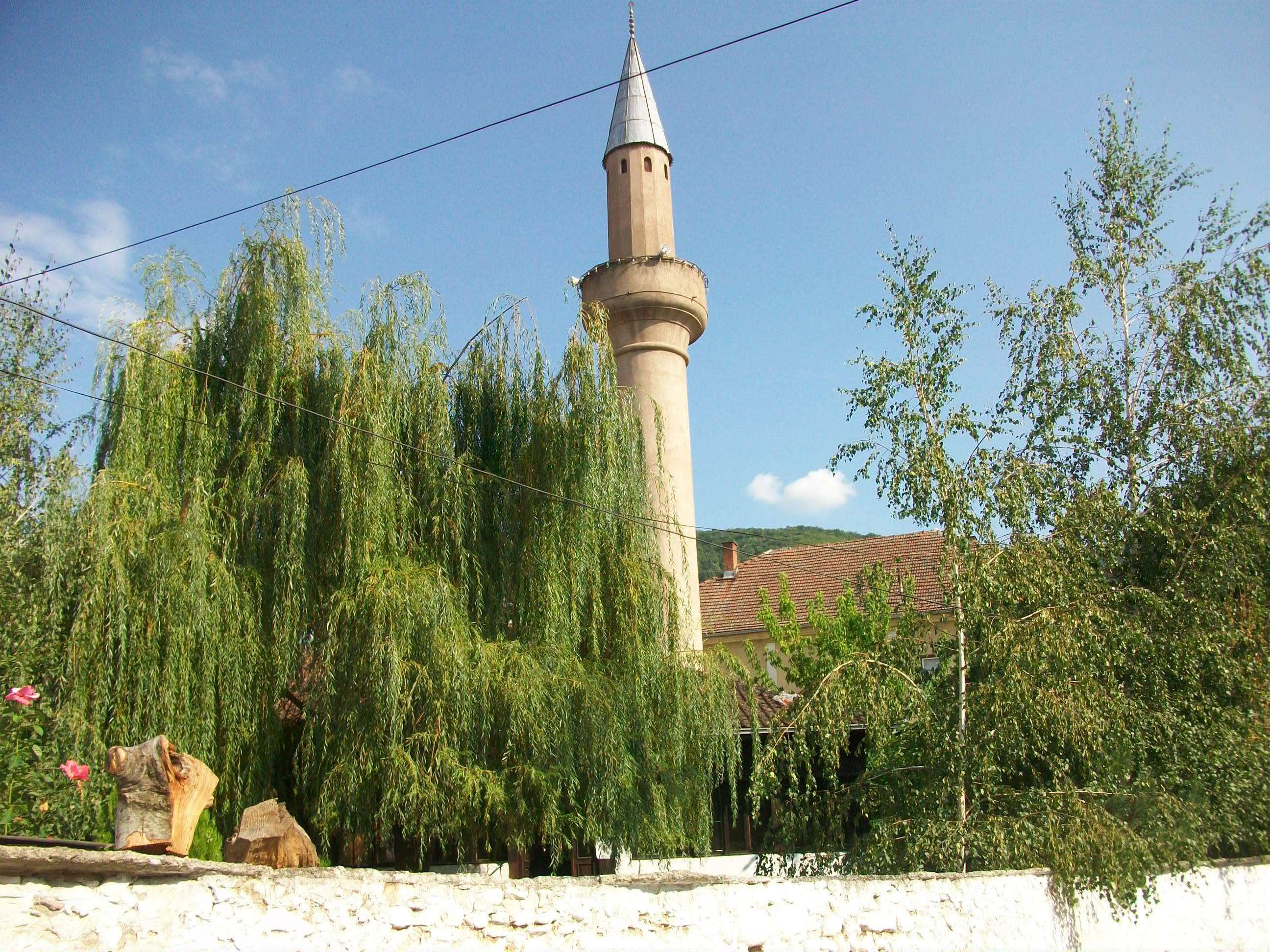
Mosque of Muderis Ali Efendi

- 1543–1581: Building of Mosque of Muderis Ali Efendi.
- Between 1545 and 1574: Building of the Bajrakli Mosque (also known as Mehmet Pasha's, Mehmed-Pašina).
- 1555 – The first book in Albanian, Meshari, was published by Gjon Buzuku.

Mustafe Pashe Prizrenit

- 1562–1563: Building of Mustafa Pasha Mosque in Prizren. Destroyed in 1950 after a storm. At the location of the former UNMIK headquarters, now municipality building.
- 1566: Building of Mosque of Sejdi Beu.
- 1576: Building of Sinan 1576 or 1589/1590.
- 1591: Building of Katip Sinan Qelebi Mosque in Prizren.
- 1594: "Arasta (Evreson beu)"-Mosque built in 1594. Renovated in 1962.

== 17th century ==
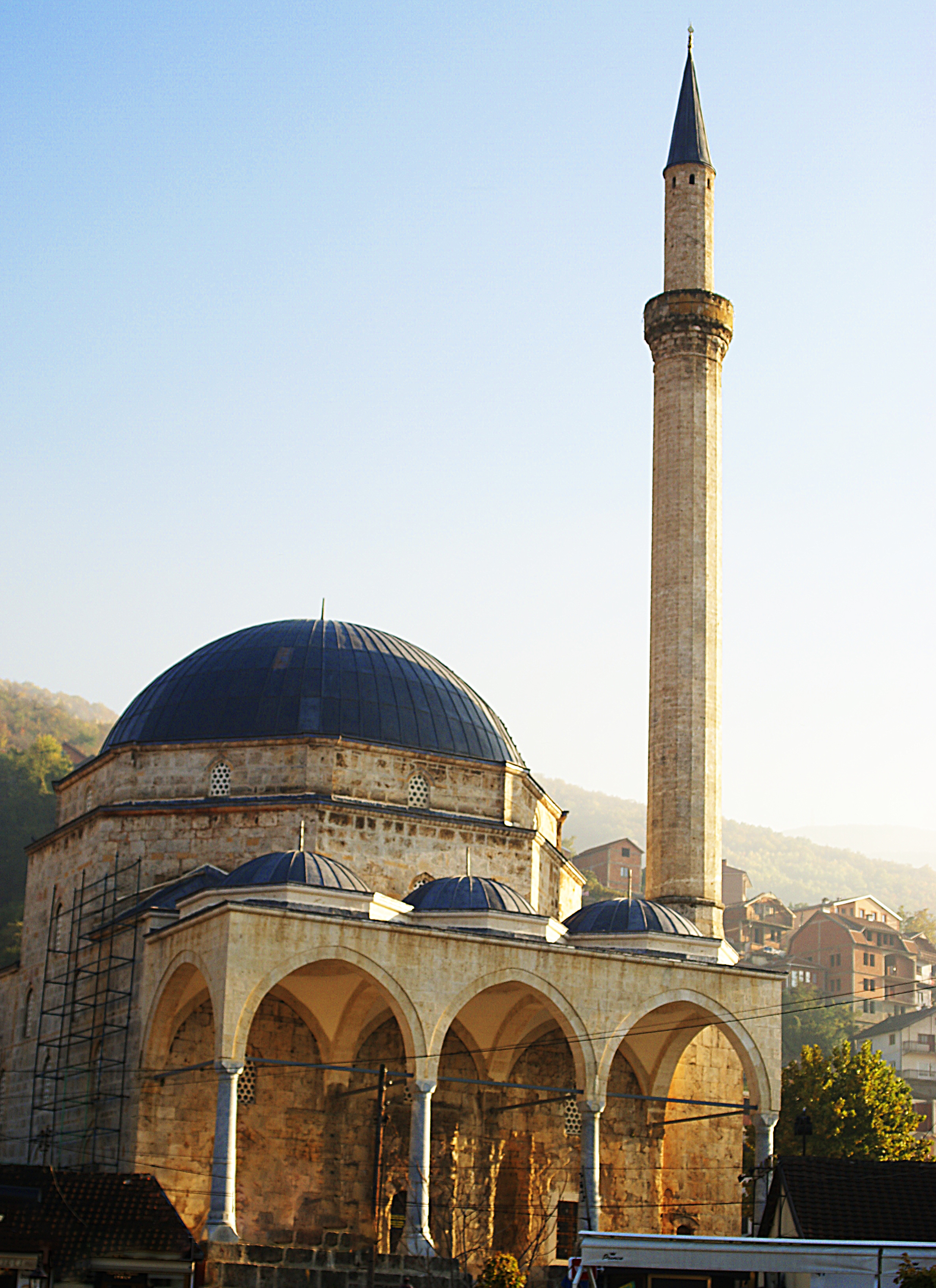
1615 building of Sinan Pasha Mosque (Prizren)

- 1615 building of Sinan Pasha Mosque (Prizren).
- 1646 Kaderi-Zingjirli 1646 or 1665.
- 1650 Mosque of Sejdi Beu t 1650.
- 1667 Great Turkish War 1667–1683.
- 1668 Sinan 1668 or 1706.
- 1689–1692: Great Serb Migration.
- 1689 Building of Mosque of Begzadës.
- 1699 Mosque of Helveti Serezi by Osman Baba 1699-1700.

== 18th century ==
- 1701 – 04 – Albanian and Montenegrin assembly against Ottoman ruling.
- 1721: Prizren, building of the Mosque of Mehmet Lezi Bey also known as Albanian: Terzive Serbian: Terzijski (Tailors Mosque) It was built by Memish the Tailor, and located in the street of Terzis (Terzi mahala, Mahalla e Terzive).
- 1739: The fall of the Habsburg Kingdom of Serbia (1718–1739) to the Ottomans triggered the Second Great Serb Migration into the (rest of the) Habsburg monarchy.
- 1785 – Large areas of Kosovo become part of the Pashalik of Scutari under Kara Mahmud Bushati.

== 19th century ==
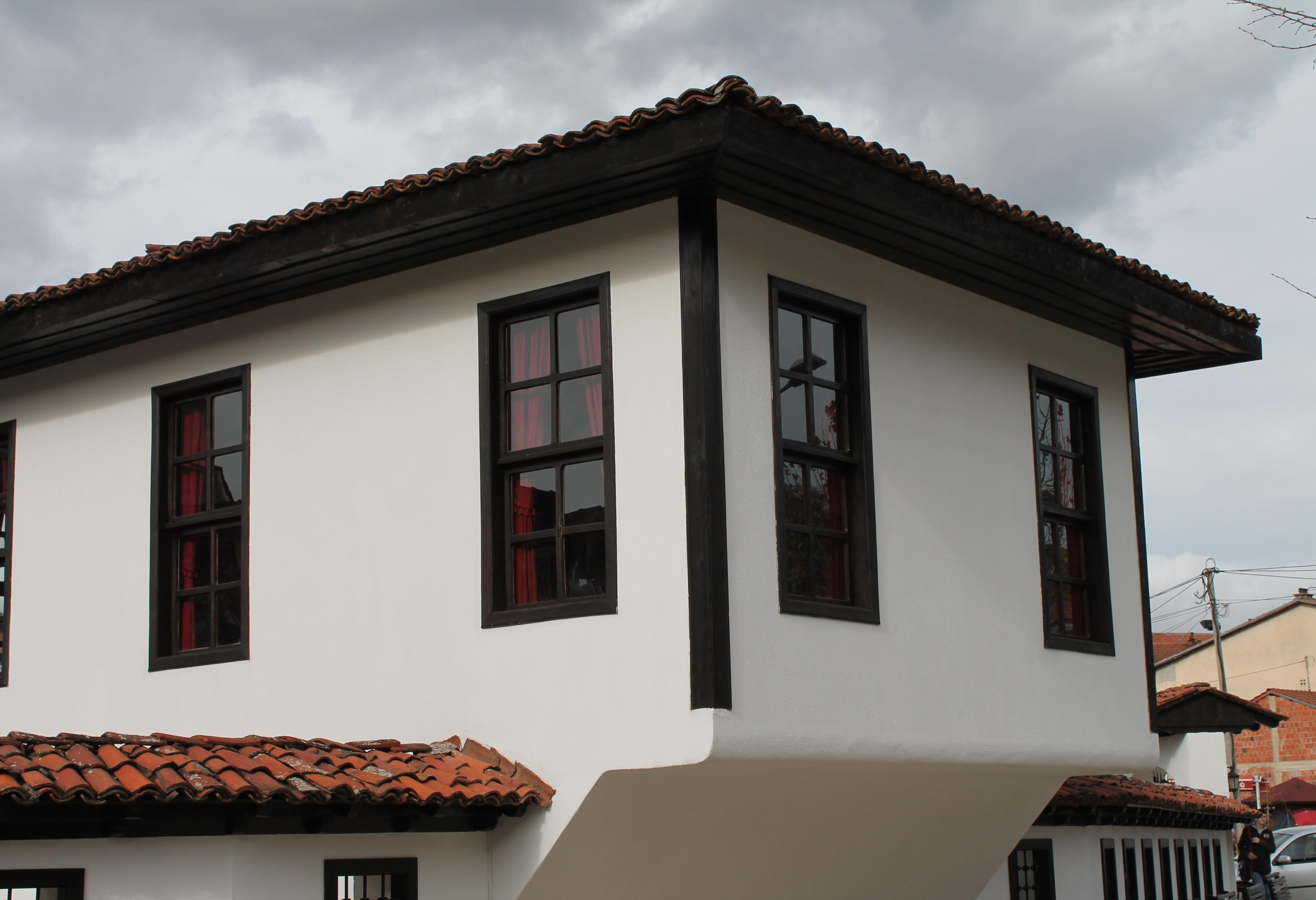
Lidhja e Prizrenit

- 1800: Building of Budak Hoxha Mosque, Dragomani Mosque, Haxhi Ramadani Mosque, Tabakhanës Mosque.
- 1808: Building of Markëllëq Mosque.
- 1828: Building of Kalasë Mosque (destroyed in 1912).
- 1830: Building of Kaderi Rezaki Mosque.
- 1831: Building of Emin Pasha Rrotllësi Mosque.
- 1833: Building of Hoqa Mahallës Mosque, of Mahmoud Pasha.
- 1839 (3 November) – The decree of Tanzimat was announced.
- 1843: Albanian Revolt of 1843–1844, directed against the Ottoman Tanzimat reforms which started in 1839 and were gradually being put in action.
- 1850: Building of Bektashi Mosque.
- 1856: Building of Episcopal Church of St. George, in Prizren.
- 1863–65; Ottoman military expeditions in Kosovo.
- 1867–68; Ottoman military expeditions in the Yakova Highlands.
- 1870: Commission of the Cathedral of Our Lady of Perpetual Succour.
- 1871 Seminary in Prizren, established on 1 October 1871.
- 1877 – Kosovo Vilayet was formed by the Ottoman Empire.
- 1878 (10 June) – The political organisation, League of Prizren was formed.
- 1878 (13 June – 13 July) – Congress of Berlin takes place.
- 1878 (3–6 September) – Mehmed Ali Pasha, who was to overview the cession of the then-predominantly Albanian Plav-Gucia region to the Principality of Montenegro is killed during an attack undertaken by local committees of the League of Prizren.
- 1878 – 27 November – Planar meeting of the League of Prizren.
- 1879 (Spring) – The journey of an Albanian delegation headed by Abdyl Frashëri in major capital cities of Europe to protect the Albanian issues of territory.
- 1880 (December) – Temporary Governance was announced in Prizren.
- 1881 - Turkish troops enter Ferizovik.
- 1881 (21 April) - Battle of Štimlje and Slivova.
- 1881 (23 April) – Ottoman forces enter Prizren.
- 1881 (8 May) – Ottoman forces recapture Gjakova from the League of Prizren.
- 1885 – Revolt in Kosovo against Ottoman governance.
- 1889 – Azem Galica was born.
- 1892: Building of Melami Mosque.
- 1893: Building of Rufai Mosque.
- 1895 - Shote Galica was born.
- 1897 – Revolt in Kosovo against Ottoman governance.
- 1899 – League of Peja was formed, led by Haxhi Zeka.

== 20th century ==
- 1903 – Revolt in Mitroviça.
- 1904 – Revolt in Kosovo.
- 1908 – The Young Turk Revolution starts within the Ottoman Empire.
- 1910 (April-May) – The Battle of Kaçanik Pass.
- 1910 (May–June) - New taxes levied in the early months of 1910 resulted with Albanian Revolt of 1910 which was suppressed within a month.
- 1911 (24 March – 4 August) - Albanian rebels in Kosovo Vilayet and Scutari Vilayet initiated Albanian Revolt of 1911 supported by the Kingdom of Montenegro and King Nikola Petrović who allowed the main headquarter of the rebellion to be in Podgorica. Balkan countries and Italy believed that Austria-Hungary was responsible for the revolt.
- 1912 (January — August) – During Albanian Revolt of 1912 rebels managed to capture almost whole territory of the Kosovo Vilayet including its seat Skopje.
- 1912 (April – May) – The armed struggles between Albanians and Ottoman forces in Kosovo.
- 1912 (July) – Major cities in Kosovo fall into the hands of Albanian revolutionaries.
- 1912 (4 September) – The Ottoman government ended the rebellion by agreeing to fulfil the rebels' demands which included establishing of the Albanian vilayet.
- 1912 – The Balkan Wars begin as Montenegro and Serbia (followed by Bulgaria and Greece) declare war on the Ottoman Empire. The Balkan League besieges Constantinople. Serbia and Montenegro divide the Raška region, Albania and Kosovo, while Serbia also takes the offensive on Macedonia in the Battle of Kumanovo and the Battle of Monastir. The Ottoman Empire capitulates.
- 1912 – The Balkan Wars: the Kingdom of Serbia, Kingdom of Greece and Kingdom of Montenegro overrun almost all Albanian-populated territory in the hope of dividing the land amongst themselves.
- 1912 (28 November) – The independence of Albania is declared, claiming four vilayets including Kosovo.
- 1913: The Albanian state in finalised; Serbs, Greeks and Montenegrins withdraw. Kosovo has been divided between Serbia (the larger part) and Montenegro. All of this was ratified at the Treaty of London.
- 1918 (7 November) – Committee for the National Defence of Kosovo finalises its formation
- 1918: Serbia's absorption of Montenegro followed by its unification with the State of Slovenes, Croats and Serbs to form the first incarnation of Yugoslavia takes the territories of Kosovo with it into the new entity (ratified in various treaties throughout 1919 and 1920).

The time period, 1919 – 1926 was characterised by massive deportation of Kosovar Albanians

  - 1919 – 23,500 Kosovars emigrated to Turkey.
  - 1920 – 8,536 Kosovars emigrated to Turkey.
  - 1921 – 24,532 Kosovars emigrated to Turkey.
  - 1922 – 12,307 Kosovars emigrated to Turkey.
  - 1923 – 6,389 Kosovars emigrated to Turkey.
  - 1924 – 9,630 Kosovars emigrated to Turkey, 43 families immigrated to Albania.
- 1924 (25 May) – The armies of Bajram Curri start a revolt.
- 1925 (29 March) – Bajram Curri is killed.
- 1925 – 4,315 Kosovars immigrated to Turkey, 148 families immigrated to Albania.
- 1926 – 4,012 Kosovars immigrated to Turkey, 399 families immigrated to Albania.
- 1926 (20 November) – A revolt in Metohija begins.

The time period, 1927 – 36 was characterised by massive migrations of Kosovars.

  - 1927 – 5,197 Kosovars emigrated to Turkey, 316 families immigrated to Albania.
  - 1928 – 4,326 Kosovars emigrated to Turkey, 149 families immigrated to Albania.
  - 1929 – 6,219 Kosovars emigrated to Turkey, 216 families immigrated to Albania.
  - 1930 – 13,215 Kosovars emigrated to Turkey, 199 families immigrated to Albania.
  - 1931 – 28,807 Kosovars emigrated to Turkey, 624 families immigrated to Albania.
  - 1932 – 6,219 Kosovars emigrated to Turkey, 211 families immigrated to Albania.
  - 1933 – 3,420 Kosovars emigrated to Turkey, 181 families immigrated to Albania.
  - 1934 – 14,500 Kosovars emigrated to Turkey, 328 families immigrated to Albania.
  - 1935 – 9,565 Kosovars emigrated to Turkey, 386 families immigrated to Albania.
  - 1936 – 4,252 Kosovars emigrated to Turkey, 182 families immigrated to Albania.
- 1936 (January–February) – Oil Workers start a strike in Kosovo.
  - 1937 – 4,234 Kosovars emigrated to Turkey.
  - 1938 – 7,251 Kosovars emigrated to Turkey, 4,046 families immigrated to Albania.
  - 1939 – 7,255 Kosovars emigrated to Turkey.
- 7 April 1939: During World War II, the majority of Kosovo was part of the Italian occupation of Albania.
  - 1940 – 6,792 Kosovars emigrated to Turkey.
- 1941 (6 April) – The Invasion of Yugoslavia by Hitler's army.
- September 1943: Kosovo becomes part of Nazi German occupied Albania.
- 1943 (16 September) - The Second League of Prizren took place, led by Bedri Pejani.
- 1944: The Democratic Federal Yugoslavia is created with the national boundary with Albania precisely as it had been prior to World War II.
- 1944 (2 January) – In the Assembly of Bujan, Kosovars declared that they are a political population and that they want to unite with Albania.
- 1944 (5 October) – The Fifth Brigade, and days later The Third Brigade of the Albanian army(UNÇSH), cross the state border to enslave Kosovo from enemy occupation.
- 1944 (23 October) – The Pristina Massacre.
- 1944 (7 November) – The liberation of Gjakova by the Albanian army.
- 1944 (18 November) – The final liberation of Dukagjin and Kosovo by the Albanian army.
- 1945: Kosovo as a political unit resurfaces for the first time since 1912. Now named the Autonomous Region of Kosovo and Metohija (1945–1963), the new entity exists as an autonomous region within the People's Republic of Serbia but it only occupies a fraction of the territory which had been Kosovo prior to 1912: whilst a part of the former vilayet remained within Central Serbia, the other lands were placed in the newly created Yugoslav republics of Montenegro and Macedonia (both outside of and equal partners to Serbia).

The time period, 1952 – 1965 was characterised by massive migrations of Kosovars

  - 1952 – 37,000 Kosovars emigrated to Turkey.
  - 1953 – 19,300 Kosovars emigrated to Turkey.
  - 1954 – 17,500 Kosovars emigrated to Turkey.
  - 1955 – 51,000 Kosovars emigrated to Turkey.
  - 1956 – 54,000 Kosovars emigrated to Turkey.
  - 1958 – 41,300 Kosovars emigrated to Turkey.
  - 1957 – 57,710 Kosovars emigrated to Turkey.
  - 1959 – 32,000 Kosovars emigrated to Turkey.
  - 1960 – 27,980 Kosovars emigrated to Turkey.
  - 1961 – 31,600 Kosovars emigrated to Turkey.
  - 1962 – 15,910 Kosovars emigrated to Turkey.
  - 1963 – 25,720 Kosovars emigrated to Turkey.
- 1963: As a result of the new constitution, the Socialist Federal Republic of Yugoslavia is announced. Kosovo sees an increase in the level of self-rule, and was raised from region to province, as the Autonomous Province of Kosovo and Metohija (1963–1968).
  - 1964 – 21,530 Kosovars emigrated to Turkey.
  - 1965 – 19,821 Kosovars emigrated to Turkey.
- 1968 – A big wave of protests started in Kosovo and Europe (by Kosovars). Name of the province changed to Socialist Autonomous Province of Kosovo.
- 1969 – 70 – The Universiteti i Prishtinës was founded.
- 1971: A higher level of autonomy is devolved to Kosovo's authorities.
- 1974 – The Socialist Autonomous Province of Kosovo significantly increased its autonomy within the Socialist Republic of Serbia.
- 1974–(81) – Xhavit Nimani was elected president of the Socialist Autonomous Province of Kosovo.
- 1980 – The death of Josip Broz Tito Death and funeral of Josip Broz Tito.
- 1981 (March) – Mass Albanian student protests in Pristina demand independence of Kosovo.
- 1981 – Population census (1,584,441 people were registered).
- 1981–(82) – Ali Šukrija was elected president of the Socialist Autonomous Province of Kosovo.
- 1982-(83) - Kolë Shiroka was elected president of the Socialist Autonomous Province of Kosovo.
- 1983-(85) - Shefqet Nebih Gashi was elected president of the Socialist Autonomous Province of Kosovo.
- 1985–(86) – Branislav Skemberavić was elected president of the Socialist Autonomous Province of Kosovo.
- 1986 – Slobodan Milošević became the leader of Serbia and seized control of Kosovo.
- 1987 (24 April): As animosity between Serbs and Albanians in Kosovo had deepened during the 1980s, Slobodan Milošević was sent to address a crowd of Serbs in Kosovo Polje.
- 1989 – Slobodan Milošević drastically reduced Kosovo's special autonomous status within Serbia and started cultural oppression of the ethnical Albanian population.
- 1989 (28 June) – Slobodan Milošević delivers a speech and led a mass celebration with hundreds of thousands (almost one million) Serbs in Gazimestan on the 600th anniversary of a 1389.
- 1990 (2 July) – The self-declared Kosovo parliament declared Kosovo a republic in Yugoslavia
- 22 September 1991: – The self–declared parliament declared Kosovo an independent country as the Republic of Kosova.
- 1992 (May) – Ibrahim Rugova was elected president, during its run the Republic of Kosovo was recognised only by Albania, it was formally disbanded in 1999 after the Kosovo War.
- 1996–1999: Clashes between the KLA and the security forces of the Federal Republic of Yugoslavia intensify to become a full-scale war.
- 1998 – The Yugoslav government signs a cease fire and partial retreat monitored by Organization for Security and Co-operation in Europe (OSCE).
- 1998 (5, 6, 7 March) – The Jashari family was executed by Serbian police, 64 members of the Jashari family killed, including at least 24 women and children (see Attack on Prekaz).
- 1999 (January) – Račak massacre.
- 1999 (24 March) – NATO intervened in the war by bombing Yugoslavia.
- 10 June 1999: The Kosovo War comes to an end and Kosovo becomes a UN administrated province under UNSC Resolution 1244, which is controlled by the United Nations Interim Administration Mission in Kosovo.
- 1999 (10 June) – UN Security Council passed UN Security Council Resolution 1244.

== 21st century ==
Geographical map of Kosovo

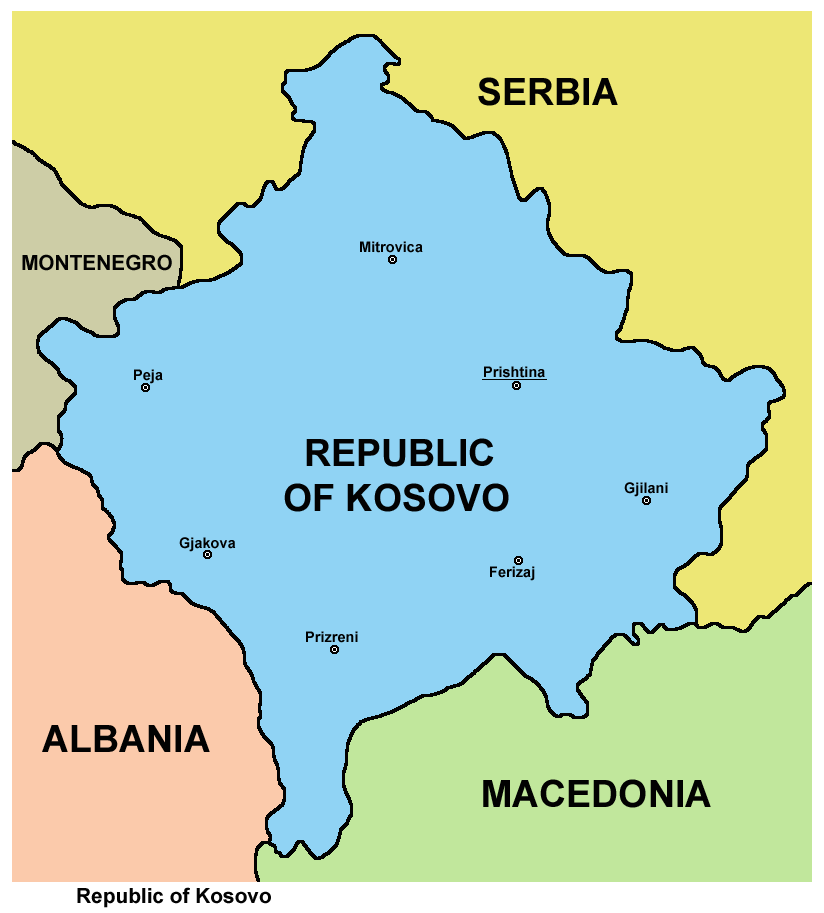
Map of the Republic of Kosovo, as proclaimed in 2008

- 2000 unrest in Kosovo
- 2001 – The Organization for Security and Co-operation in Europe OSCE supervised the first elections in the Kosovo Assembly and elected Ibrahim Rugova as president and Bajram Rexhepi as prime minister.
- 2004 unrest in Kosovo
- 2004 (October) – Parliamentary elections were held which resulted in Ramush Haradinaj becoming prime minister, while Ibrahim Rugova retained his position as president.
- 2006 (21 January) –The first president of Kosovo, Ibrahim Rugova died and was succeeded by Fatmir Sejdiu.
- 2006 (July) – First direct talks since 1999 between ethnic Serbian and Kosovar leaders on future status of Kosovo take place in Vienna.
- 2007 (February) – United Nations envoy Martti Ahtisaari unveils a plan to set Kosovo on a path to independence, which is immediately welcomed by Kosovo Albanians and rejected by Serbia.
- 2007 (17 November) – Parliamentary elections were held which resulted in Hashim Thaçi becoming prime minister and Fatmir Sejdiu as president. Hashim Thaçi stated his intention to declare the independence of Kosovo.
- 2008 unrest in Kosovo
- 2008 (16 February) – The European Union Rule of Law Mission in Kosovo is formed which slowly replaced UNMIK.
- 2008 – (17 February), 15:39 – The Republic of Kosovo declared its independence.
- 2008 (April) – Most of the member countries of NATO, EU, WEU, OECD have recognised Kosovo as a country.
- 2009 (21 January) – Kosovo Security Force is formed, a 2,500 strong NATO trained lightly armoured Security Force.
- 2009 (August) – Ethnic clashes break out in Mitrovica.
- 2009 (November) – First post-independence local elections.
- 2010 (22 July) – International Court of Justice votes 10–4 in a non-binding advisory opinion that Kosovo's declaration of independence did not violate international law.
- 2010 (September) – President Fatmir Sejdiu resigns after court rules that he breached the constitution by staying in a party post while in office,
- 2010 (October) – Caretaker president Jakup Krasniqi calls early general election for February 2011. Fatmir Sejdiu's Democratic League of Kosovo (LDK) pulls out of governing coalition.
- 2011–13: North Kosovo crisis
- 2011 (22 February – 30 March) – Behgjet Pacolli becomes president after winning narrow majority in third round of voting in parliament. Hashim Thaçi is re-appointed as prime minister.
- 2011 (March) – Serbia and Kosovo begin direct talks to try end their dispute – their first talks since Kosovo broke away from Serbia.
- 2011 – President Pacolli steps down after the high court rules parliament had not been in quorum during his election. Parliament elects senior police officer Atifete Jahjaga to be Kosovo's first female president in April.
- 2013 January – EU-mediated talks resume between Kosovo and Serbia days after parliament in Belgrade approves support for minority Serb rights within Kosovo – de facto recognition of Kosovar sovereign territorial integrity.
- 2013 Kosovo and Serbia sign the 2013 Brussels Agreement.
- 2014 - The International Olympic Committee admitted the Kosovo Olympic Committee as a full member on 9 December 2014 during its 127th IOC session in Monaco.
- 2015 - Kosovo is unsuccessful in its application to join UNESCO.
- 2016 - FIFA admitted the Football Federation of Kosovo as its 210th member at its 66th Congress in Mexico City.
- 2021 February - Vetëvendosje become the largest party in the Kosovo Assembly and Albin Kurti becomes Prime Minister following the 2021 Kosovan parliamentary election.
- 2021 September to October: 2021 North Kosovo crisis
- 2022 May - Kosovo formally applies to join the Council of Europe.
- 2022 July: Start of the ongoing North Kosovo crisis.
- 2022 December - Kosovo formally applies to join the European Union.
- 2023 March - Kosovo signs the 2023 Ohrid Agreement, and Serbia verbally agrees to the agreement.
- 2023 April - On 18 April 2023, the European Parliament approved visa liberalisation for Kosovo passport holders with no objections.
- 2024 - From 1 January 2024, holders of a Kosovar passport were allowed to enter the Schengen Area, as well as Cyprus without a visa for short stays, or 90 days within a 180-day period.
- 2025 February - Vetëvendosje wins the February 2025 Kosovan parliamentary election.

== See also ==
- Timeline of Albanian history
- Timeline of Serbian history
