= Third cabinet of Hashim Thaçi =

Former cabinet of Kosovo

Third Thaçi cabinet
- Tenth cabinet of Kosovo
- 17 February 2008 – 9 December 2014
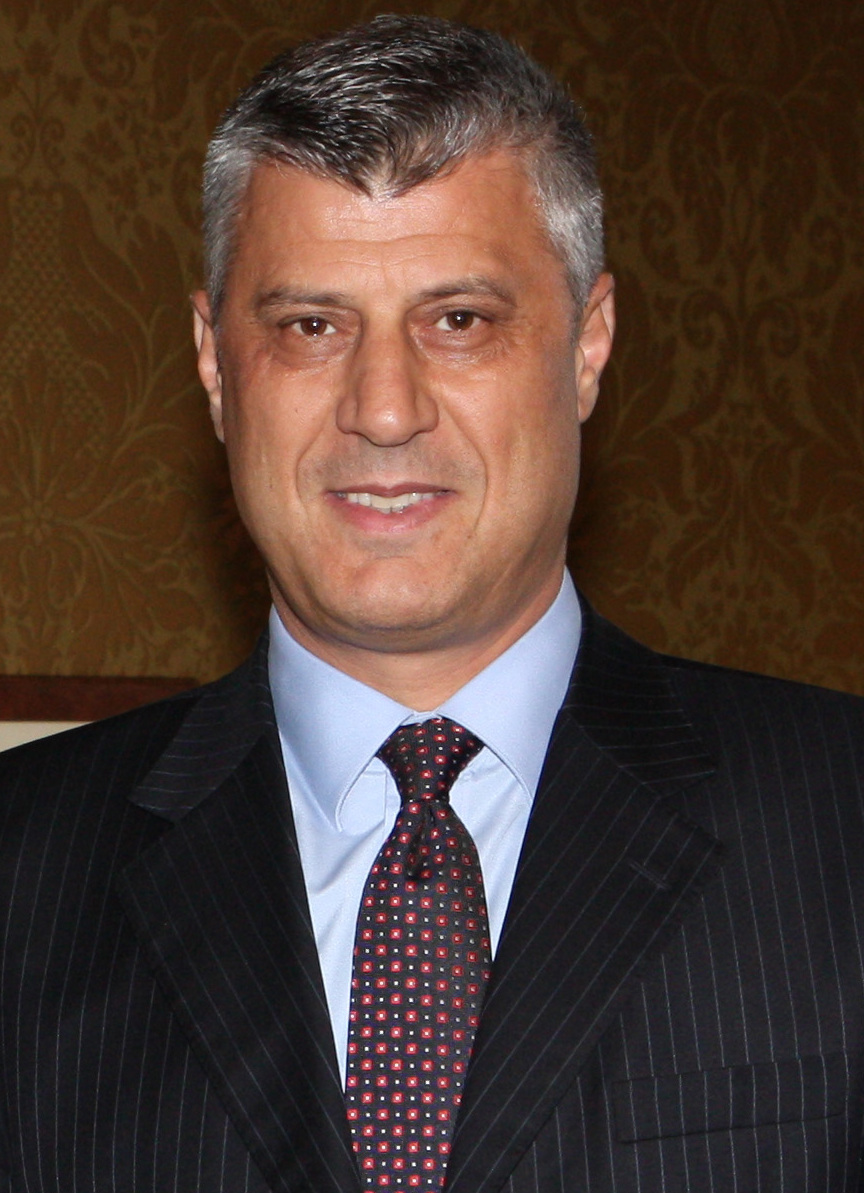
- Hashim Thaçi
- Date formed: 17 February 2008
- Date dissolved: 9 December 2014

People and organisations
- Head of state: Fatmir Sejdiu; Jakup Krasniqi; Behgjet Pacolli; Jakup Krasniqi; Atifete Jahjaga
- Head of government: Hashim Thaçi
- Member parties: PDK, LDK, KDTP, SL

History
- Election: 2007
- Legislature term: 3rd legislature of the Assembly
- Predecessor: Second Cabinet of Hashim Thaçi
- Successor: First Cabinet of Isa Mustafa

The Third Thaçi cabinet was the cabinet of Kosovo led by Prime Minister Hashim Thaçi between 17 February 2008 and 9 December 2014.

== Composition ==
The cabinet consisted of the following Ministers:

Position	Portfolio	Name	Party
Prime Minister	General Affairs	Hashim Thaçi	PDK
First Deputy Prime Minister	International Recognitions and Foreign Investments	Behgjet Pacolli	AKR
Deputy Prime Minister	No Portfolio	Bujar Bukoshi	LDK - Lista Rugova
Deputy Prime Minister	Dialogue with Serbia	Edita Tahiri	ADK
Deputy Prime Minister and Minister	Justice	Hajredin Kuçi	PDK
Deputy Prime Minister and Minister	Trade and Industry	Mimoza Kusari-Lila	AKR
Deputy Prime Minister and Minister	Local Government Administration	Slobodan Petrović	SLS
Minister	Foreign Affairs	Enver Hoxhaj	PDK
Minister	European Integration	Vlora Çitaku	PDK
Minister	Security Forces	Agim Çeku	PSD
Minister	Internal Affairs	Bajram Rexhepi	PDK
Minister	Finance	Bedri Hamza	PDK
Minister	Culture, Youth and Sport	Memli Krasniqi	PDK
Minister	Economic Development	Besim Beqaj	PDK
Minister	Education, Science and Technology	Ramë Buja	PDK
Minister	Public Administration	Mahir Yağcılar	KDTP
Minister	Infrastructure	Fehmi Mujota	PDK
Minister	Agriculture	Blerand Stavileci	PDK
Minister	Health	Ferid Agani	PD
Minister	Labour and Social Welfare	Nenad Rašić	SLS
Minister	Environment and Spatial Planning	Dardan Gashi	LDK - Lista Rugova
Minister	Community and Return	Radojica Tomić	SLS
Minister	Diaspora	Ibrahim Makolli	AKR
