= Kosovo–Nigeria relations =

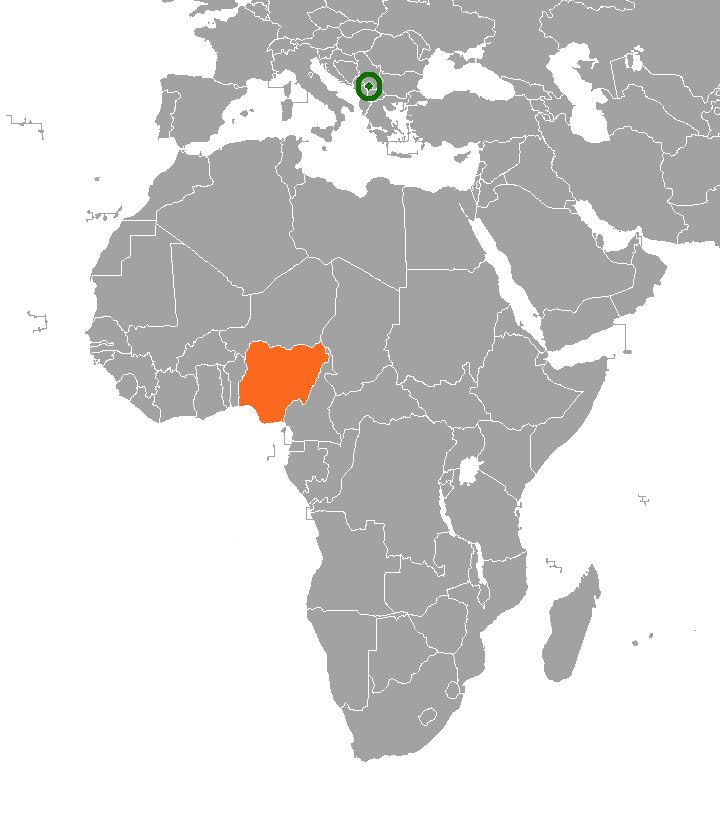

- Kosovo: Nigeria

Kosovo–Nigeria relations are foreign relations between Nigeria and Kosovo. There are no formal diplomatic relations between the two states as Nigeria has not recognized Kosovo as a sovereign state.

== History ==
In July 2009, Umaru Yar'Adua, President of Nigeria, said that Nigeria would not recognise Kosovo as an independent nation and that the decision was informed by Nigeria's historical experience of the civil war of 1967 to 1970, fought to maintain its territorial integrity and sovereignty, declaring that "Since the end of the civil war, Nigeria has continued to embark on nation-building policies and strategies to forge a heterogeneous, yet inclusive nation".

In November 2009, Ojo Maduekwe, Foreign Minister of Nigeria (and former advocate of Biafran independence), emphasised that Nigeria would never recognise the independence of Kosovo.

In August 2011, Kosovo's First Deputy Prime Minister Behgjet Pacolli said that he had received from senior Nigerian state leaders support and guarantee that Kosovo recognition would be seriously dealt with in a short period of time.

Reports of Nigeria recognising Kosovo appeared in 2011. In a 22 September 2011 statement, a spokesman for the Nigerian Ministry of Foreign Affairs, Damian Agwu, said that the Nigerian Federal Government had decided to "open a trade office in Pristina". However, the following day the Ministry reversed course and said no trade office would be opened.

It was reported in September 2012 that Olugbenga Ashiru, Nigerian Foreign Minister, had denied that the recognition took place. Behgjet Pacolli, the First Deputy Prime Minister of Kosovo, reiterated that the recognition occurred and claimed that Ashiru never spoke with the Gazeta Express.

In January 2013, former Foreign Minister of Kosovo Skënder Hyseni said that the recognitions by Nigeria and Uganda were "contested, not only by the respective states, but also by the US State Department". Current Foreign Minister, Enver Hoxhaj, stated that he was certain that the number of recognitions is valid. The lack of recognition was confirmed by the Nigerian Foreign Minister in March 2014.

== See also ==
- Foreign relations of Kosovo
- Foreign relations of Nigeria
