= Cabinet of Isa Mustafa =

Former cabinet of Kosovo

Mustafa Cabinet
- Eleventh cabinet of Kosovo
- 9 December 2014 – 9 September 2017
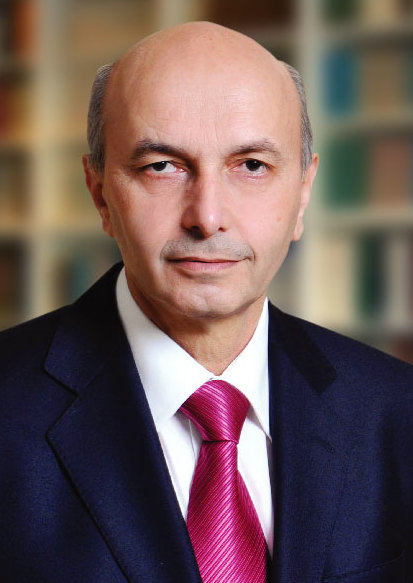
- Isa Mustafa
- Date formed: 9 December 2014
- Date dissolved: 9 September 2017

People and organisations
- Head of state: Atifete Jahjaga; Hashim Thaçi
- Head of government: Isa Mustafa
- Deputy head of government: Hajredin Kuçi
- Member parties: LDK, PDK, SL, KDTP, LB, PD, Vakat

History
- Outgoing formation: 10 May 2017
- Election: 2014
- Legislature term: 5th legislature of the Assembly
- Predecessor: Third Cabinet of Hashim Thaçi
- Successor: Second Cabinet of Ramush Haradinaj

The Mustafa cabinet was the cabinet of Kosovo led by Prime Minister Isa Mustafa between 9 December 2014 and 9 September 2017.

== Composition ==
The cabinet consisted of the following Ministers:

Position	Portfolio	Name	Party
Prime Minister	General Affairs	Isa Mustafa	LDK
Deputy Prime Minister	No Portfolio	Hajredin Kuçi	PDK
Deputy Prime Minister	No Portfolio	Kujtim Shala; Ramiz Kelmendi	LDK
Deputy Prime Minister	Foreign Affairs	Hashim Thaçi; Enver Hoxhaj	PDK
Deputy Prime Minister	Culture, Youth and Sports	Kujtim Shala; Vlora Dumoshi	LDK
Deputy Prime Minister	No Portfolio	Branimir Stojanović	Srpska
Minister	Justice	Hajredin Kuçi; Dhurata Hoxha	PDK
Minister	Administration and Local Self-government	Ljubomir Marić	Srpska
Minister	Communities and Returns	Dalibor Jevtić	Srpska
Minister	Public Administration	Mahir Yağcılar	KDTP
Minister	Education, Science and Technology	Arsim Bajrami	PDK
Minister	Finances	Avdullah Hoti; Agim Krasniqi	LDK
Minister	Diaspora	Valon Murati	LB
Minister	Agriculture, Forestry and Rural Development	Memli Krasniqi	PDK
Minister	European Integration	Mimoza Ahmetaj	PDK
Minister	Economic Development	Blerand Stavileci	PDK
Minister	Environment and Spatial Planning	Ferid Agani	PD
Minister	Internal Affairs	Skënder Hyseni	LDK
Minister	Infrastructure	Hanefi Muharremi	LDK
Minister	Trade and Industry	Hikmete Bajrami	LDK
Minister	Health	Imet Rrahmani	LDK
Minister	Labour and Social Welfare	Safet Kamberi	LDK
Minister	Security Force	Haki Demolli	LDK
Minister	No Portfolio	Edita Tahiri	ADK
Minister	No Portfolio	Rasim Demiri	Vakat
