= Bajram Kosumi =

Former prime minister of Kosovo

Prime Minister of Kosovo
- In office 23 March 2005 – 1 March 2006
- Preceded by: Adem Salihaj (Acting)
- Succeeded by: Agim Çeku

Personal details
- Born: March 20, 1960 (age 66) Kosovska Kamenica, PR Serbia, FPR Yugoslavia
- Party: PDK

Bajram Kosumi (born 20 March 1960) is a Kosovar politician who served as prime minister of Kosovo for nearly one year. He was nominated by Kosovan President Ibrahim Rugova and elected prime minister by the Kosovo Parliament on 23 March 2005 following his predecessor Ramush Haradinaj's indictment for war crimes and subsequent resignation. Kosumi resigned on 1 March 2006 amid widespread unpopularity and was replaced by former general leader Agim Çeku. He also served as the deputy chairman of the Alliance for the Future of Kosovo.

== Family and life ==
He is married and has four children. He lives in Pristina and Kamenica.

== Education ==
He graduated in Philology and has a master's degree in Albanian Literature from the University of Pristina. In 2008 he became a Doctor of Philology

== Career ==
Kosumi is a veteran figure on Kosovo's political scene. He was a student activist and in March 1981 was sentenced to 15 years in jail for taking part in demonstrations against the government. He served almost ten years of his sentence before being released in 1991.

From 1991 until 1993 he worked as a journalist.

In 1993, Kosumi became president of the Parliamentary Party of Kosovo. He is a quiet, cerebral politician, who took part in the Rambouillet talks in early 1999, prior to the Kosovo War. Kosumi was a supporter of the Kosovo Liberation Army (KLA) insurgency, but he did not take up arms or wear the uniform. He did serve as minister of information in the provisional government of Kosovo.

He is currently deputy chairman of the Alliance for the Future of Kosovo, the third largest political party in Kosovo. From December 2004 until he became the third post-war Prime Minister of Kosovo, Kosumi was the Minister for Environment and Spatial Planning of the Government of Kosovo.

== Published books ==
Bajram Kosumi has also published a number of books.

- Book of Liberty (Albanian: Libri i lirisë) (1991), Pristina.
- A Concept on Sub-Policy (1995), Pristina.
- Vocabulary of Barbarians (2000), Pristina.
- A Concept on the New Political Thought (2001), Pristina.
- Fishta's Lyric (Albanian: Lirika e Fishtës) (1994), Tirana.

== Notes ==
Political offices
| Preceded by Adem Salihaj; Acting | Prime Minister of Kosovo; 2005–2006 | Succeeded by Agim Çeku |
