= Mustafa cabinet =

Mustafa cabinet may refer to:

- Cabinet of Isa Mustafa, Kosovo cabinet (2014–2017)
- Mustafa Government, Palestine cabinet (2024–)
