= China's reaction to the 2008 Kosovo declaration of independence =

Kosovo's declaration of independence from Serbia was enacted on Sunday, 17 February 2008 by a unanimous vote of the Assembly of Kosovo. All 11 representatives of the Serb minority boycotted the proceedings. International reaction was mixed, and the world community continues to be divided on the issue of the international recognition of Kosovo. The People's Republic of China reacted with firm opposition.

== Reaction ==
In February 2008, the Chinese Foreign Ministry made a statement stressing that the PRC "expresses grave concern" over Kosovo's unilateral declaration of independence. The Minister added that: "The resolution of the Kosovo issue bares [sic] on peace and stability of the Balkan region, the fundamental norms governing international relations as well as the authority and role of the UNSC. China always believes that a plan acceptable to both Serbia and Kosovo through negotiations is the best way to resolve this issue. The unilateral move taken by Kosovo will lead to a series of consequences. China is deeply worried about its severe and negative impact on peace and stability of the Balkan region and the goal of establishing a multi-ethnic society in Kosovo. China calls upon Serbia and Kosovo to continue negotiations for a proper resolution within the framework of the international law and work together to safeguard peace and stability of the Balkan region. The international community should create favorable conditions for that".

On 20 February 2008, the Republic of China (Taiwan) recognized Kosovo, despite the pressure from the PRC.

On 15 May 2008, the Foreign Ministers of India, Russia and China made a joint statement regarding Kosovo during a conference in Yekaterinburg. It was read by the host minister, Sergey Lavrov of Russia, and it said: "In our statement, we recorded our fundamental position that the unilateral declaration of independence by Kosovo contradicts Resolution 1244. Russia, India and China encourage Belgrade and Pristina to resume talks within the framework of international law and hope they reach an agreement on all problems of that Serbian territory".

On 23 August 2009, the presidents of Serbia and China, Boris Tadić and Hu Jintao, signed a joint declaration on the establishment of strategic partnerships. In point VI this document reconfirms that China respects the sovereignty and territorial integrity of Serbia. It considers that the best way to resolve the Kosovo issue is to develop a plan that would be acceptable for both sides, through dialogue and negotiations between the Government of Serbia and Kosovo authorities, in accordance with the purposes and principles of the UN Charter and relevant resolutions of UNSC, within international law. The declaration says that unilateral action will not contribute to resolving this issue, and that the international community should create favourable conditions for solving it.

In December 2009, for the first time in its history, China entered a process before the ICJ. China backed the position of Serbia saying that sovereign states have a right to prevent unilateral secessions and protect their integrity.

In August 2020, in an article for journal Napredak, then Chinese Ambassador to Serbia Chen Bo stated that "China respects the sovereignty and territorial integrity of Serbia", and that China is in favor of finding a mutually acceptable solution within United Nations Security Council Resolution 1244.

== See also ==
- International recognition of Kosovo
- China–Kosovo relations
- Kosovo–Taiwan relations
- China–Serbia relations
