= China–Kosovo relations =

- China: Kosovo

China and Kosovo do not have formal diplomatic relations as China does not recognize Kosovo as a sovereign state. However, China has a liaison office in Kosovo, and trade ties are increasing.

China's liaison office in Pristina has five staff members. Kosovo does not maintain representation in China.

== History ==
The Chinese government has had a geopolitical interest in Kosovo since the 1999 NATO bombing of Yugoslavia. The Chinese government saw the bombing as an example of US aggression in service of American goals, and worried that it could create a precedent for US military intervention in China.

Prior to Kosovo's declaration of independence in 2008, then Minister of Foreign Affairs of China Li Zhaoxing, during his visit to Serbia and Montenegro in 2005, reiterated China's support to territorial integrity of Serbia and that the final resolution to Kosovo would have to take place under the auspices of the United Nations and parameters established by the United Nations Security Council resolutions.

After Kosovo's declaration of independence from Serbia was enacted on Sunday, 17 February 2008, by a unanimous vote of the Assembly of Kosovo, all 11 representatives of the Serb minority boycotted the proceedings. International reaction was mixed, and the world community continues to be divided on the issue of the international recognition of Kosovo. In February 2008, the Chinese Foreign Ministry made a statement stressing that the PRC "expresses grave concern" over Kosovo's unilateral declaration of independence. The Minister added that: "The resolution of the Kosovo issue bares [sic] on peace and stability of the Balkan region, the fundamental norms governing international relations as well as the authority and role of the UNSC. China always believes that a plan acceptable to both Serbia and Kosovo through negotiations is the best way to resolve this issue. The unilateral move taken by Kosovo will lead to a series of consequences. China is deeply worried about its severe and negative impact on peace and stability of the Balkan region and the goal of establishing a multi-ethnic society in Kosovo. China calls upon Serbia and Kosovo to continue negotiations for a proper resolution within the framework of the international law and work together to safeguard peace and stability of the Balkan region. The international community should create favorable conditions for that".

According to analysis from the German Law Journal, China's position on Kosovo's status is influenced both by China's principled commitment to non-interference as well as by China's interests with respect to separatist movements in Tibet, Xinjiang, and Taiwan. The government of Taiwan recognized Kosovo as independent on 20 February 2008.

On 23 August 2009, the presidents of Serbia and China, Boris Tadić and Hu Jintao, signed a joint declaration on the establishment of strategic partnerships. In point VI this document reconfirms that China respects the sovereignty and territorial integrity of Serbia. It considers that the best way to resolve the Kosovo issue is to develop a plan that would be acceptable for both sides, through dialogue and negotiations between the Government of Serbia and Kosovo authorities, in accordance with the purposes and principles of the UN Charter and relevant resolutions of the UNSC, within international law. The declaration says that unilateral action will not contribute to resolving this issue, and that the international community should create favourable conditions for solving it.

In December 2009, for the first time in its history, China entered a process before the International Court of Justice (ICJ). China backed the position of Serbia saying that sovereign states have a right to prevent unilateral secessions and protect their integrity.

Kosovo participated in the 2022 Winter Olympics in Beijing. The government of Kosovo announced in 2021 that it would participate in the US-led diplomatic boycott of Olympics, meaning that Kosovo's team would participate but the president of Kosovo would not participate as head of the delegation.

On 30 May 2023, following the escalation of the 2022–2023 North Kosovo crisis, Foreign Ministry spokesperson Mao Ning stated that China supports "Serbia’s effort to safeguard sovereignty and territorial integrity, oppose unilateral actions by the temporary institutions in Pristina and call on it to perform its duty of establishing an association/community of Serb majority municipalities."

== Economic ties ==
Although China and Kosovo do not have formal relations, their trade ties have been increasing. In an interview with Indian news outlet The Print, former Prime Minister of Kosovo Ramush Haradinaj stated that despite the lack of formal ties, the Chinese are open to all economic exchanges. Typically, Chinese companies operating in Kosovo do so from a base in Albania or, less commonly, in Serbia. Chinese foreign direct investment in Kosovo is at a low level, though Chinese entities were involved in submitting an unsuccessful bid to construct Kosova e Re. The Chinese telecommunications company Huawei also made an unsuccessful offer to build Kosovo's 5G network.

Tourism and business travel between Kosovo and China have been increasing.

== See also ==
- China–Serbia relations
- China's reaction to the 2008 Kosovo declaration of independence
