= Kosovo–Taiwan relations =

- Kosovo: Taiwan

Kosovo–Taiwan relations are foreign relations between the Republic of Kosovo and the Republic of China. Kosovo declared its independence on 17 February 2008. Taiwan officially recognized Kosovo in February 2008 but Kosovo did not reciprocate recognition. The Taipei Representative Office in Hungary represents the interests of Taiwan in Kosovo in the absence of formal diplomatic relations.

== History ==
During the Kosovo War in 1998–1999, the government of Taiwan under president Lee Teng-hui donated US$300 million in aid to Kosovo for refugee relief and reconstruction.

After the Kosovan declaration of independence, the Taiwanese foreign ministry announced that it officially recognized Kosovo in February 2008. Kosovo did not reciprocate recognition, due to wanting China's support in the United Nations: the Kosovan government merely thanked Taiwan.

In December 2021, Taiwan's Legislative Yuan and the Kosovan Assembly established parliamentary diplomacy groups to deepen relations between the two countries. In 2023, nine members from the Kosovo-Taiwan Parliamentary Friendship Group visited Taiwan to meet with President Tsai Ing-wen and other cabinet officials in Kosovo's first parliamentary delegation to Taiwan.

In March 2024, Kaohsiung and Pristina established sister city relations, with Kaohsiung mayor Chen Chi-mai and Pristina mayor Përparim Rama signing the agreement during a Pristina delegation's four-day visit to Kaohsiung. Former prime minister Avdullah Hoti led a delegation to Taiwan the following month.

== Aid and development ==
In 1999, the Taiwanese government offered US$300 million to Kosovo for refugee relief. In addition, it donated over 100 buses with the words "Love from Taiwan" on them, drawing criticism from China.

The Private Sector Youth Initiative, an economic development program run by the European Bank for Reconstruction and Development (EBRD) to tackle youth unemployment in Kosovo, is co-sponsored by the Taipei Representative Office in Hungary. At a fair, the Taiwanese representative to Hungary met with the EBRD's Kosovo office to expand cooperation.

== Trade ==
The Taiwan External Trade Development Council and the Kosovo Chamber of Commerce signed a memorandum of understanding to promote business cooperation between the two countries.

== See also ==
- International recognition of Kosovo
