= Ministry of Foreign Affairs (Kosovo) =

Government ministry of Kosovo

- Ministria e Punëve të Jashtme
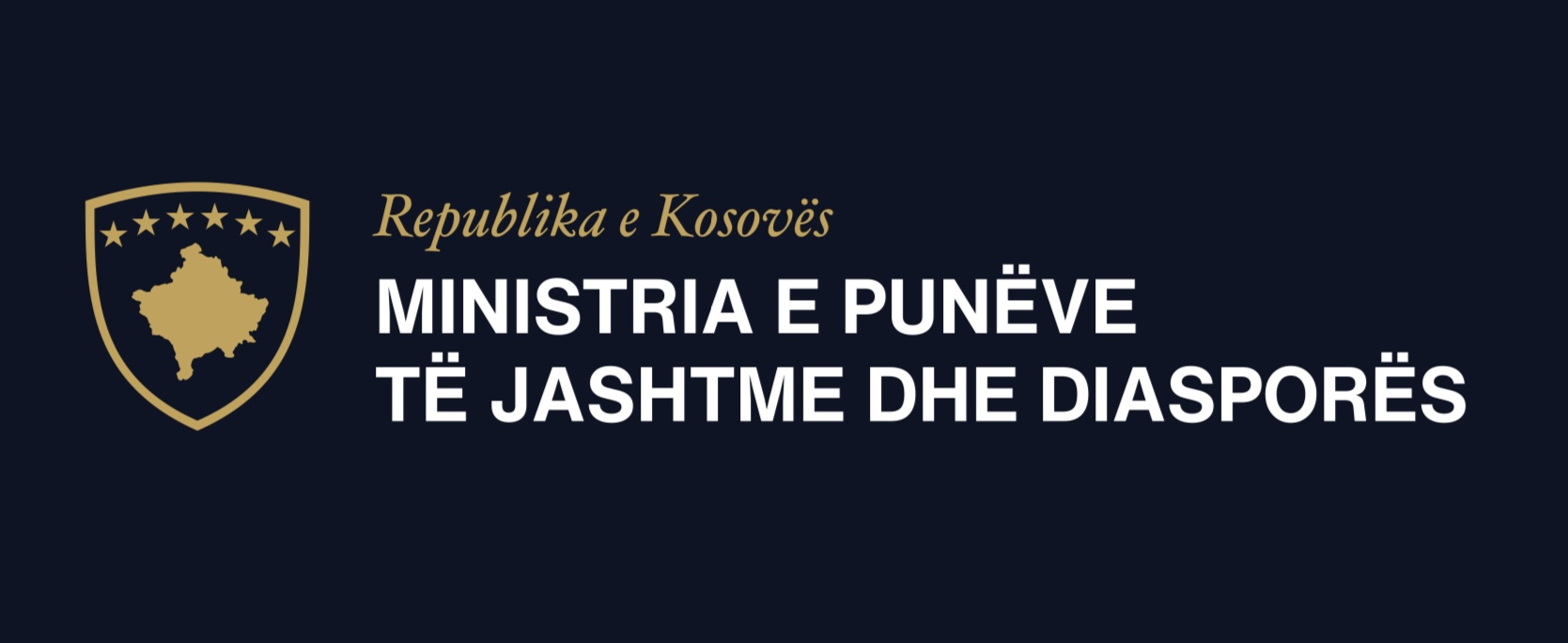
- Logo

- Coat of arms of Kosovo

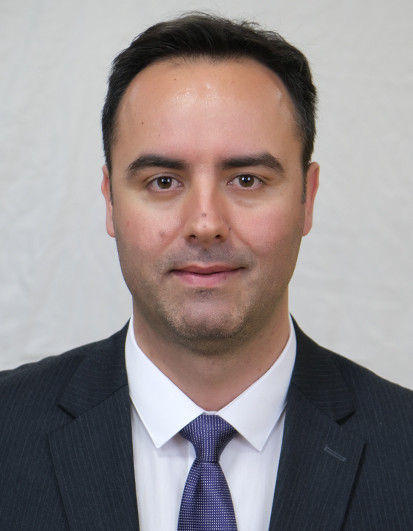
- Glauk Konjufca

Ministry overview
- Jurisdiction: Government of Kosovo
- Headquarters: Rruga Luan Haradinaj, Sheshi Nënë Tereza, 10000, Pristina, Kosovo; 42°39′35″N 21°9′18″E
- Employees: 207
- Minister responsible: Glauk Konjufca
- Deputy Minister responsible: Kreshnik Ahmeti; Vacant
- Ministry executive: Behar Isma, General Secretary
- Website: mfa-ks.net

The Ministry of Foreign Affairs and Diaspora (Albanian: Ministria e Punëve të Jashtme dhe Diasporës) is a department of the government of Kosovo responsible for the foreign policy of Kosovo. The ministry has its headquarters in Pristina, with Glauk Konjufca as the incumbent foreign minister in the third cabinet of Albin Kurti.

== Overview ==
The cabinet within the Ministry of Foreign Affairs is composed of several key components, including the Minister, Deputy Ministers, Political advisers and the Support staff. Their responsibilities are defined by a comprehensive framework of legal and regulatory provisions, which encompasses among others the constitution, special laws and other pertinent legislation. The ministry is entrusted with a mission that encompasses the formulation and implementation of Kosovo's foreign policy, the promotion and protection of Kosovo's interests, the enhancement of Kosovo's international stature and the diligent representation and protection of the interests of its population on the international stage.

== List of ministers ==
Portrait	Minister	Term of office			Cabinet	Party
Portrait	Minister	From	To	Period	Cabinet	Party
1	Skënder Hyseni	3 March 2008	18 October 2010	2 years, 229 days	Thaçi I	LDK
Act.	Vlora Çitaku	18 October 2010	22 February 2011	127 days	Thaçi I	PDK
2	Enver Hoxhaj	22 February 2011	12 December 2014	3 years, 293 days	Thaçi II	PDK
3	Hashim Thaçi	12 December 2014	7 April 2016	1 year, 117 days	Mustafa	PDK
Act.	Petrit Selimi	7 April 2016	5 June 2016	59 days	Mustafa	PDK
4	Enver Hoxhaj	5 June 2016	3 August 2017	1 year, 61 days	Mustafa	PDK
Act.	Emanuel Demaj	10 August 2017	9 September 2017	37 days	Mustafa	PShDK
5	Behgjet Pacolli	9 September 2017	3 February 2020	2 years, 147 days	Haradinaj II	AKR
6	Glauk Konjufca	3 February 2020	3 June 2020	121 days	Kurti I	VV
7	Meliza Haradinaj-Stublla	3 June 2020	9 March 2021	279 days	Hoti	AAK
Act.	Besnik Tahiri	9 March 2021	22 March 2021	13 days	Hoti	AAK
8	Donika Gërvalla-Schwarz	22 March 2021	11 February 2026	5 years, 184 days	Kurti II	Guxo
9	Glauk Konjufca	11 February 2026	Incumbent	223 days	Kurti III	VV

== See also ==
- Foreign relations of Kosovo
  - List of diplomatic missions in Kosovo
  - List of diplomatic missions of Kosovo
- International recognition of Kosovo
- Digital Kosovo
