= Digital Kosovo =

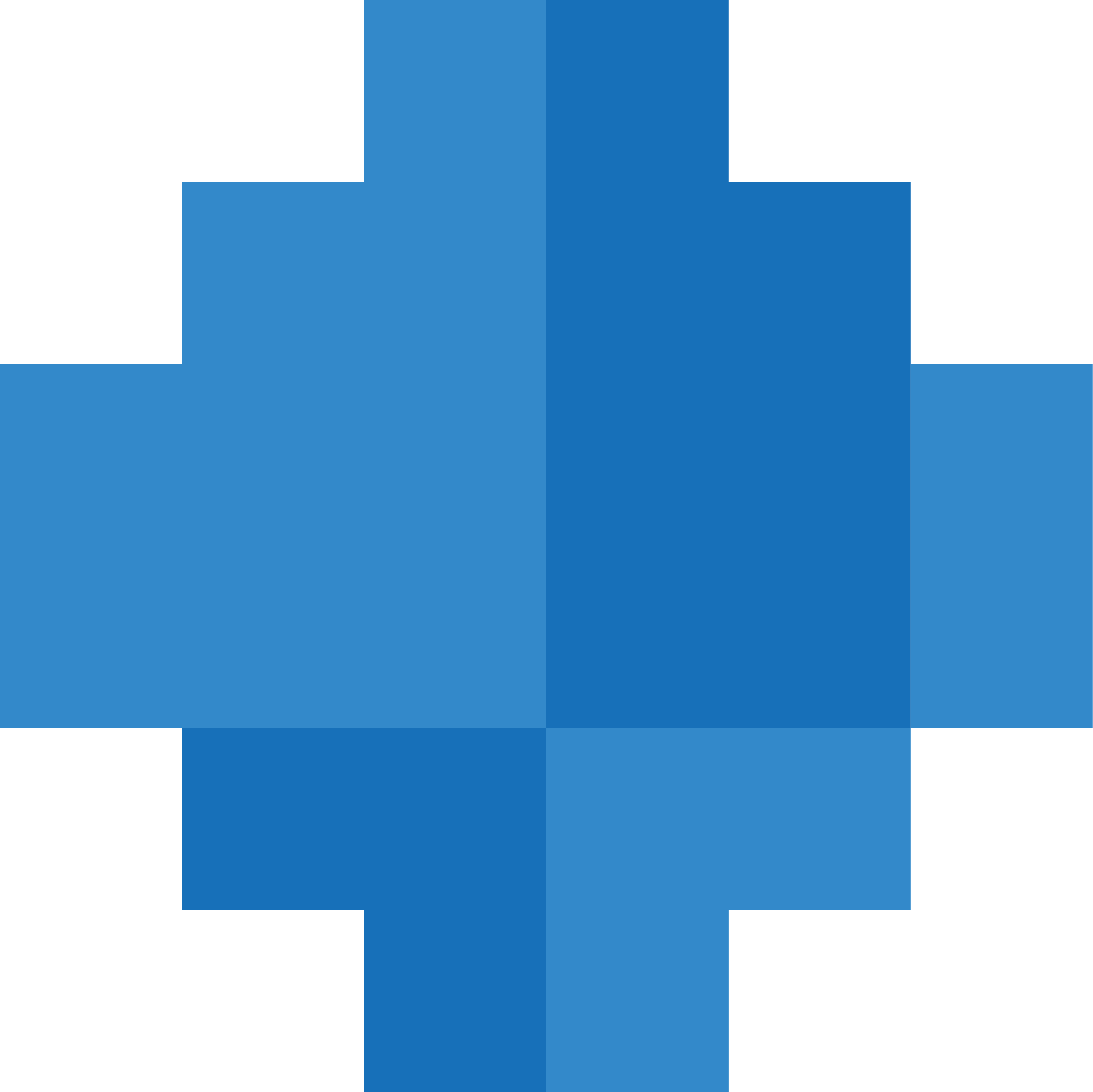
- Available in: English and Albanian
- Website: www.digitalkosovo.org
- Launched: 2 September 2013
- Current status: Online

Digital Kosovo is a digital advocacy platform, a component of the Digital Diplomacy Strategy of the Ministry of Foreign Affairs (Kosovo) and implemented by the Kosovan entrepreneur Kushtrim Xhakli and IPKO Foundation, with support of the British Council and Norwegian Embassy. The initiative is focused on enabling Kosovo citizens to act as digital diplomats, take part in online advocacy and help integrate Kosovo into the digital landscape.

== Overview ==
The platform launched on 2 September 2013 with the sole aim of supporting Kosovo's integration into the digital world, and ever since it has mobilised a community of over 1,200 active users who are engaged in hundreds of digital diplomacy actions by sending requests to different institutions. As of February 2014, Digital Kosovo has successfully integrated Kosovo on popular platforms like Facebook, Google, Dropbox, Oracle, World Wide Web Consortium.

== Awards ==
On 28 December 2013, Digital Kosovo initiative won Digital Engagement of the year on the Digital Diplomacy Review published by Yenidiplomasi.com, a platform for advocacy, research, training, consulting and publication of digital diplomacy issues.
