= Suzan Novoberdali =

Kosovar politician

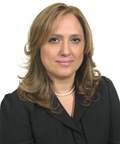
Suzan Novoberdaliu

Suzan Novoberdali (also in Albanian: Suzana Novobërdaliu) is a Kosovar politician, serving as a Member of Parliament of Kosovo since 2007. She is a member of the New Kosovo Alliance political party and the New Kosova Coalition parliamentary caucus. She lost her seat in the 2010 general elections, but returned to the parliament after 14 lawmakers resigned to take cabinet positions. On April 1, 2011, she was announced as a candidate for President of Kosovo, running against former party chairman Behgjet Pacolli in the upcoming parliamentary vote that week.

Novoberdali is the chairperson of the Parliamentary Committee on Human Rights, Gender Equality, Missing Persons and Petitions and also serves on the Committee for European Integration.
