= Enver Hoxhaj =

Kosovar politician

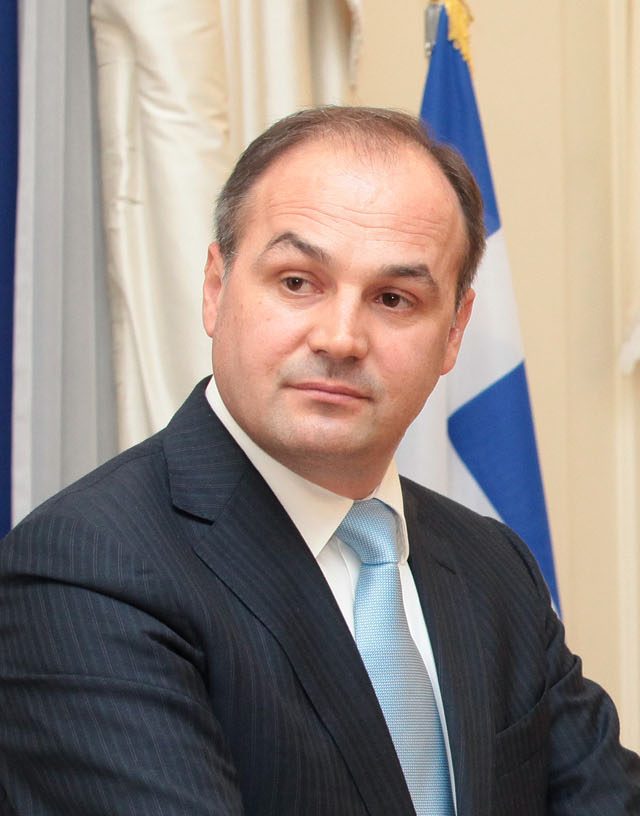

Vice President of the Assembly of the Republic of Kosovo
- In office 18 November 2021 – 15 April 2025
- Preceded by: Bedri Hamza
- Succeeded by: Vlora Çitaku

Leader of the Opposition
- In office 5 November 2020 – 24 June 2021
- Preceded by: Kadri Veseli
- Succeeded by: Memli Krasniqi

Deputy Prime Minister of Kosovo
- In office 7 September 2017 – 26 December 2019
- Prime Minister: Ramush Haradinaj
- Preceded by: Ramiz Kelmendi
- Succeeded by: Haki Abazi

Minister of Foreign Affairs
- In office 5 June 2016 – 10 August 2017
- Prime Minister: Isa Mustafa
- Preceded by: Hashim Thaçi
- Succeeded by: Behgjet Pacolli
- In office 22 February 2011 – 12 December 2014
- Prime Minister: Hashim Thaçi
- Preceded by: Vlora Çitaku (acting)
- Succeeded by: Hashim Thaçi

Personal details
- Born: 4 October 1969 (age 57) Suhareka, SAP Kosovo, SR Serbia, SFR Yugoslavia (now Kosovo)
- Party: Democratic Party of Kosovo
- Spouse: Remzie Shahini
- Children: 2
- Education: University of Pristina

Enver Hoxhaj (born 4 October 1969) is a Kosovar politician. He served as minister for foreign affairs of the Republic of Kosovo and a former leader of the Democratic Party of Kosovo.

== Early life and education ==
Hoxhaj was born in 1969 in Suhareka, then part of Yugoslavia. He then moved to Pristina to pursue an undergraduate education in history at the University of Pristina. He then moved to Austria to continue his PhD studies in political science at the University of Vienna.

== Career ==
Hoxhaj served as a professor at the University of Pristina. He worked at WUS Austria and founded Kosovar Research and Documentation Institute. In March 2004 he joined the Democratic Party of Kosovo. He was minister of education, science and technology of the Republic of Kosovo. He served twice as the foreign minister, once from 2011 to 2014, under the mandate of the government led by Hashim Thaci, and the second time he was named as a foreign minister started in June 2016, under Prime Minister Isa Mustafa.

== Written work ==
On top of several academic papers, Hoxhaj has written two books. His first book, "Ngritja e një shteti: Politika e Jashtme e Kosovës" (English: "Rise of a State: Kosovo's foreign policy") focuses on Kosovo's statehood and its statebuilding process. His second book, "Përplasja e Madhe: Si po e lufton Rusia, Kosovën dhe Ballkanin", (English: "The Great Clash: How Russia is fighting Kosovo and the Balkans") was published soon after the Russian invasion of Ukraine in 2022 and is concerned with Russia's influence in Kosovo and the Western Balkans.

== Personal life ==
Hoxhaj lives in Prishtina, together with his wife, Remzie Shahini-Hoxhaj, and his children, Lir and Lea Hoxhaj.

== Notes ==
a.	Albanian spelling: Enver Hoxhaj, Serbian spelling: Enver Hodžaj, Енвер Хоџај.

Political offices
Preceded by Vlora Çitaku; Acting	Minister of Foreign Affairs; 2011–2014	Succeeded by Hashim Thaçi
Preceded by Petrit Selimi; Acting	Minister of Foreign Affairs; 2016–2017	Succeeded by Emanuel Demaj; Acting
