= Atifete Jahjaga =

President of Kosovo from 2011 to 2016

Atifete Jahjaga ROF I
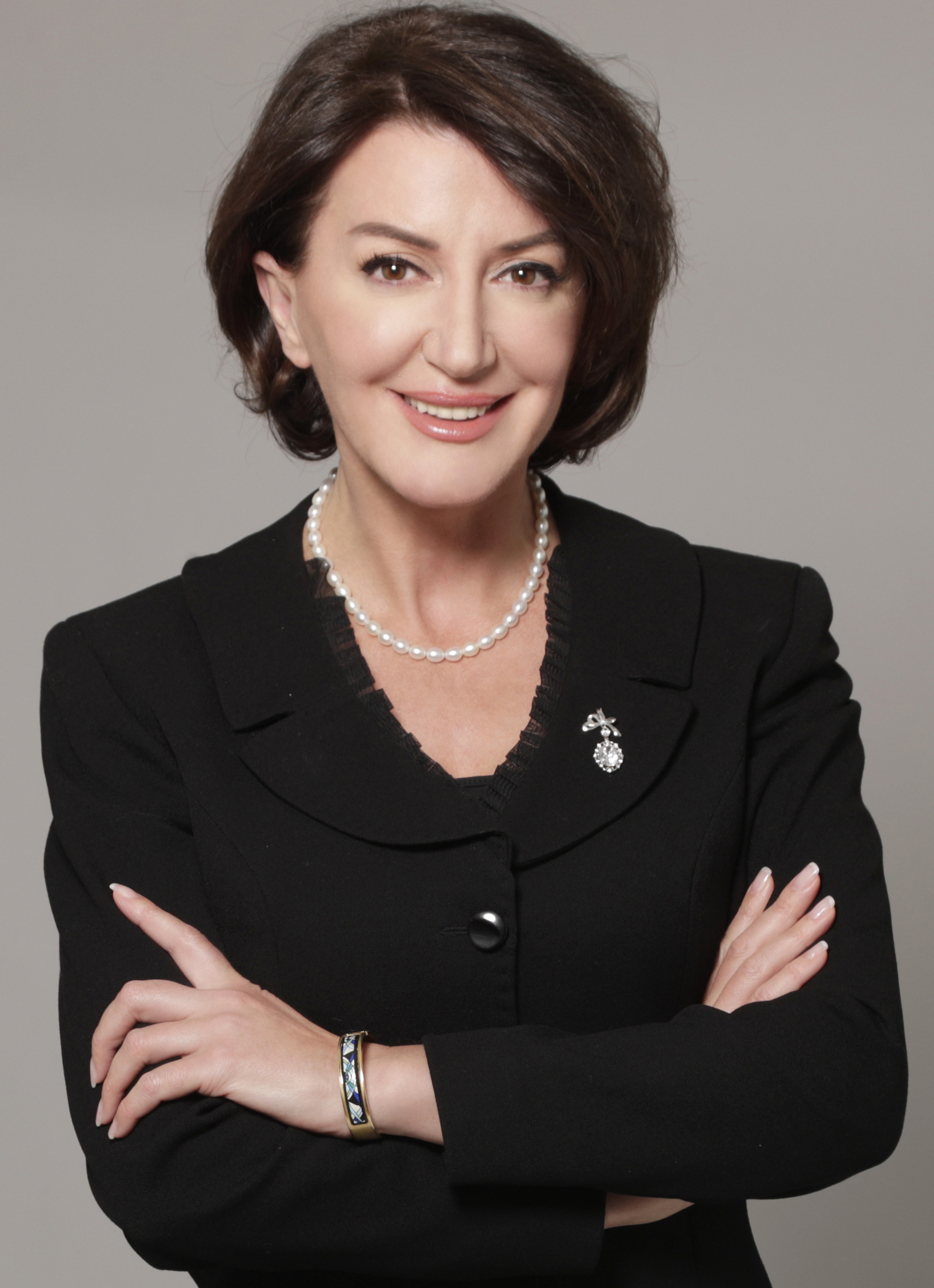
- Portrait of President Jahjaga

President of Kosovo
- In office 7 April 2011 – 7 April 2016
- Prime Minister: Hashim Thaçi; Isa Mustafa
- Preceded by: Behgjet Pacolli; Jakup Krasniqi (Acting)
- Succeeded by: Hashim Thaçi

Personal details
- Born: 20 April 1975 (age 51) Gjakovë, Yugoslavia (now Gjakova, Kosovo)
- Party: Independent
- Spouse: Astrit Kuçi (div. 2018)
- Education: University of Pristina; University of Leicester; University of Virginia
- Website: Jahjaga Foundation

Atifete Jahjaga (Albanian: [atiˈfɛtɛ jahˈjaɡa]; born 20 April 1975) is a Kosovar politician who served as President of Kosovo from 2011 to 2016. She is the first woman and the first non-partisan candidate to hold the office and is also the youngest elected president of Kosovo. Prior to her presidency, Jahjaga served as Deputy Director of the Kosovo Police, holding the rank of General Lieutenant Colonel, the highest rank achieved by a female officer in Southeastern Europe.

== Early life and education ==
Jahjaga, a Kosovo Albanian, was born in Gjakova, which was then part of the Socialist Federal Republic of Yugoslavia. Her paternal ancestry is from Berisha in northern Albania. She completed her elementary and secondary education in Gjakova and graduated from the University of Pristina with a degree in Law in 2000. In 2006/07, she completed a graduate and certificate program in police management and criminal law at the University of Leicester in the United Kingdom. Jahjaga also received professional training at the George C. Marshall European Centre for Security Studies in Germany, the FBI National Academy in the United States, and earned a postgraduate certification in Crime Science from the University of Virginia in 2007.

== Police career ==
After the Kosovo War, Jahjaga completed the Kosovo Police Academy to become an officer and was gradually promoted through the ranks, initially to major, then colonel, and ultimately to major general.

Jahjaga served as the Deputy Director of the Kosovo Police and briefly held the position of acting General Director in 2010. During her time in the Kosovo Police, she gained attention from American officers and diplomats, who presented her to senior U.S. officials on special occasions as a representative of a new generation of Kosovar civil servants.

== President of Kosovo ==
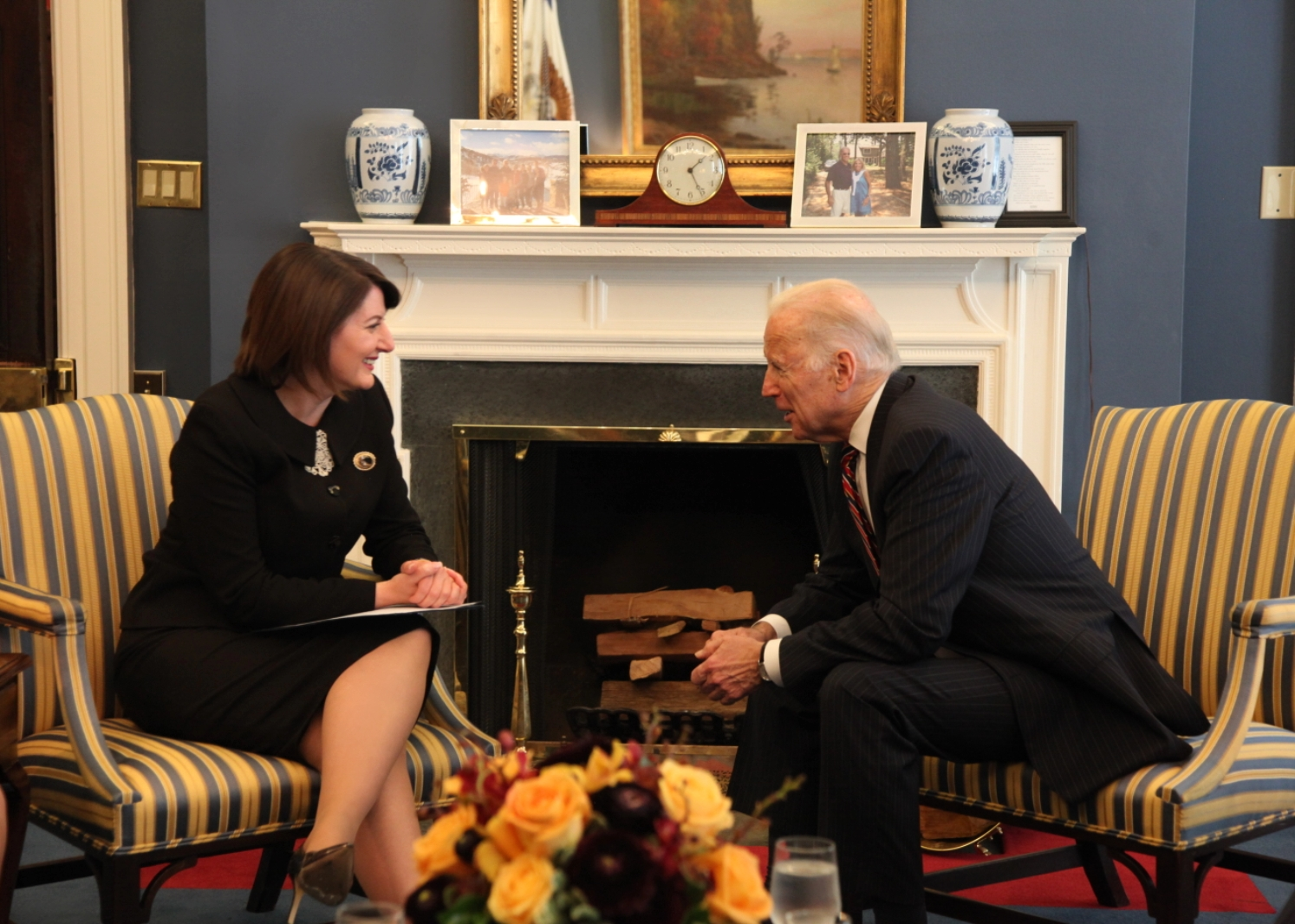
Jahjaga and U.S. Vice President Joe Biden

Following a political crisis in Kosovo, which began with the resignation of President Fatmir Sejdiu and was followed by the Constitutional Court's decision against the election of Behgjet Pacolli as President of Kosovo, Jahjaga was announced on 6 April 2011 as a consensus candidate for the office of President. Her candidacy was supported by the Democratic Party of Kosovo, Democratic League of Kosovo and the New Kosovo Alliance, as well as by the U.S. Ambassador to Kosovo, Christopher Dell. Dell urged parliament members to vote in her favor.

Although Jahjaga had a positive reputation as a police commander, she emerged from relative obscurity as a candidate for the highest office in the state, with many public and political figures unaware of her political views. On 7 April 2011, Jahjaga was elected President in the first round of voting by the Assembly of the Republic of Kosovo. Of the 100 MPs present, 80 voted in favor of Jahjaga, while 10 voted for Suzan Novoberdali. She remains the only president to be elected in the first round of voting. Kosovo's first president, Ibrahim Rugova, received more votes, having been appointed by the Parliament in 2002 with an 88-3 vote in the third round of voting.

In her inaugural address, Jahjaga emphasized her primary goal as President: guiding Kosovo on a secure path toward membership in the European Union and the United Nations. She stated, "The ideal of all Kosovo is membership in the EU and a permanent friendship with the United States. I believe and I am convinced our dreams will come true."

== Presidency ==
=== Country image building ===
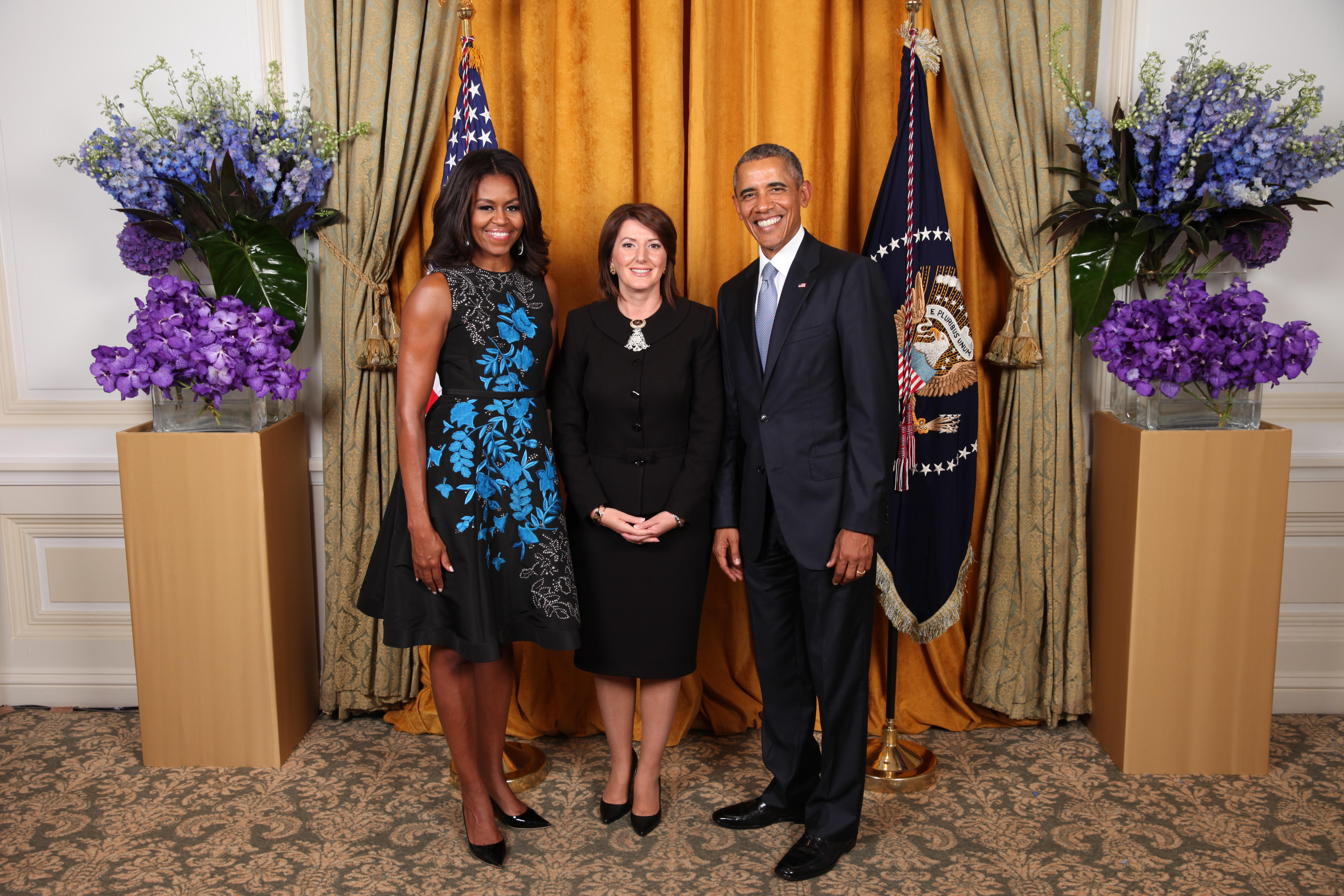
Jahjaga meets U.S. President Barack Obama and First Lady Michelle Obama

Since taking office in April 2011, President Jahjaga focused on strengthening democratic institutions in Kosovo and worked to enhance the country's international recognition. Her activities included advocating for a European and Euro-Atlantic integration agenda, supporting initiatives for reconciliation and tolerance, promoting regional cooperation, and encouraging foreign investment.

During her mandate, she emphasized the implementation of constitutional principles and aimed to expand the role of the presidency in Kosovo’s democratic development. Through participation in international forums and diplomatic visits, she sought to promote Kosovo’s state-building process and increase its visibility in international discussions.

Her leadership approach received positive international attention, and she was recognized for her engagement in promoting political dialogue and institutional development in Kosovo and the Western Balkans.

=== Constitutional leadership ===
President Jahjaga exercised her constitutional responsibilities by opposing legislation considered inconsistent with European Union standards. According to the European Commission Progress Report, her enforcement of institutional checks and balances was noted as a demonstration of the existing separation of powers in Kosovo.

In 2012, she returned the draft Criminal Code to the Assembly of Kosovo for reconsideration, requesting the removal of provisions related to freedom of expression, such as the criminalization of defamation and articles that required journalists to disclose their sources. These provisions were deemed incompatible with the Constitution of Kosovo and the European Convention on Human Rights.

During the 2013 local and 2014 general elections, she worked with the Central Election Commission and judicial institutions to ensure a transparent electoral process, following irregularities in the 2010 elections. International observers noted improvements in these elections, including the participation of Serb-majority municipalities in the north.

Following the 2014 elections, a political and constitutional impasse delayed the formation of government institutions. In response, Jahjaga held meetings with party leaders to facilitate the formation of a new government. U.S. President Barack Obama commended her efforts during this period.

Subsequently, Jahjaga, in cooperation with key institutional leaders, facilitated agreement on the establishment of the Special Court, as part of international commitments stemming from correspondence with EU High Representative Catherine Ashton.

During her mandate, Jahjaga also established three National Councils to encourage dialogue and participation from civil society, academia, and the business community. She also regularly met with representatives of ethnic communities and marginalized groups.

=== European integration process ===
Since taking office, President Jahjaga supported Kosovo's efforts toward European Union integration. In March 2012, she inaugurated the National Council for European Integration, a coordination body aimed at building political and institutional consensus on the European agenda through an inclusive and cross-party approach. At its first meeting, President Jahjaga and EU Commissioner for Enlargement, Stefan Füle, launched the Feasibility Study for the Stabilisation and Association Agreement between the Republic of Kosovo and the European Union. In 2013, the National Council adopted the first Kosovo National Strategy for European Integration, with participation from various sectors of Kosovar society.

As part of the visa liberalization dialogue with the EU, Jahjaga supported the coordination of institutional efforts to fulfill technical criteria. In early 2015, she advocated for the completion of these requirements by May 2015. Kosovo submitted its final report on the visa liberalization roadmap to the European Commission in June 2015.

In response to the increased migration of Kosovo citizens to Western Europe in early 2015, Jahjaga visited affected municipalities to engage directly with citizens and discuss their concerns. Her engagement in addressing this issue was acknowledged by several European officials, including EU Commissioner Dimitris Avramopoulos, who highlighted her role in facilitating communication and cooperation with citizens during the crisis.

=== Rule of law ===
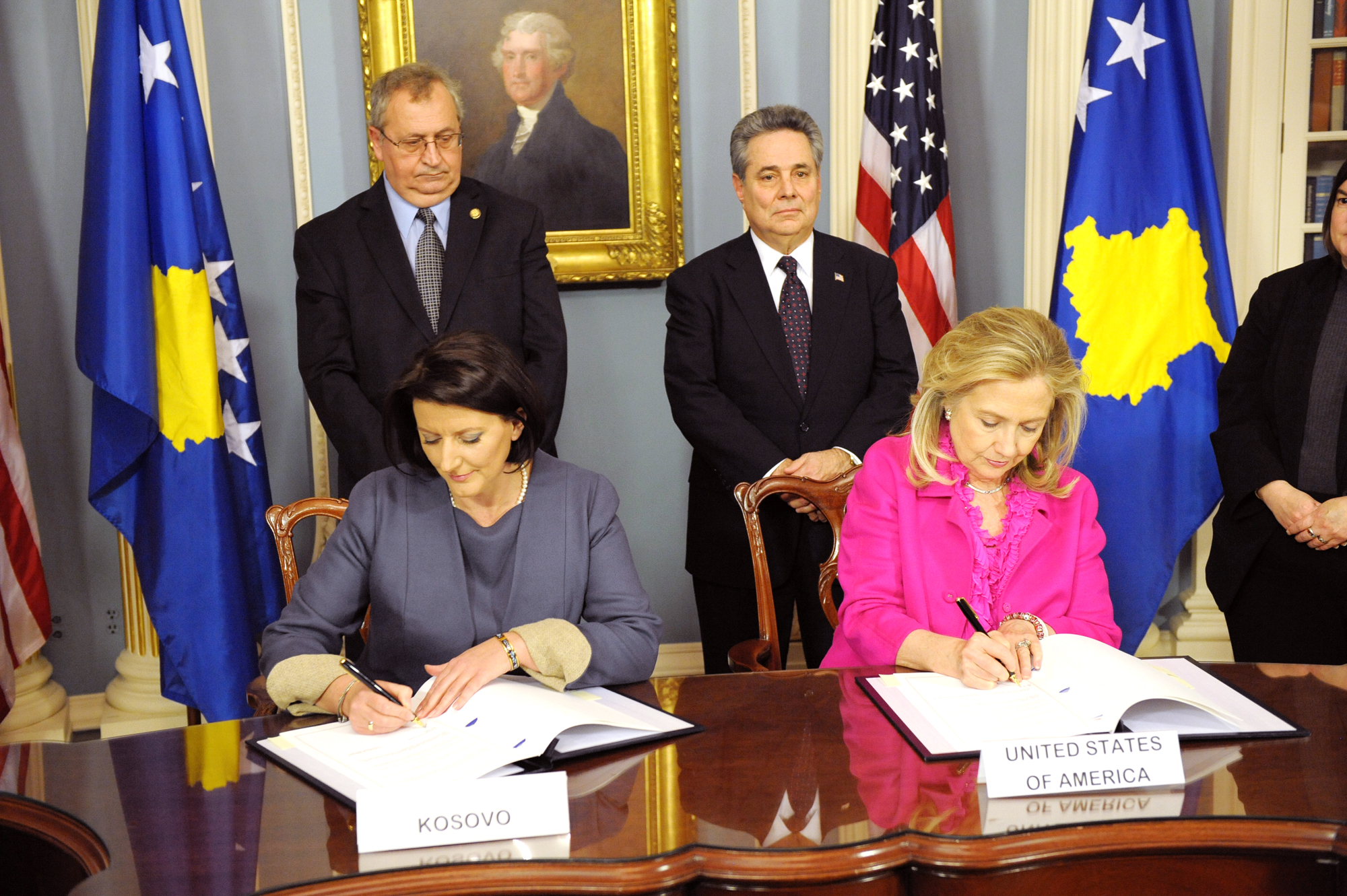
Jahjaga and U.S. Secretary of State Hillary Clinton sign the US-Kosovo Agreement on the Protection and Preservation of Cultural Properties

On 14 February 2012, President Jahjaga established the National Anti-Corruption Council, a coordinating body intended to align the work and activities of institutions and independent agencies in the prevention and fight against corruption. The Council includes representatives from various institutions and agencies, functioning as a forum for inter-institutional dialogue. In her role as guarantor of constitutional functioning, Jahjaga advocated for an independent and impartial justice system.

During the appointment process of the State Prosecutor, which involved delays by the Kosovo Prosecutorial Council and a ruling by the Constitutional Court, as well as public debates regarding potential political interference, President Jahjaga followed legal and constitutional procedures in appointing the prosecutor and emphasized transparency throughout the process.

Jahjaga also initiated reforms to the law on pardons by introducing more stringent criteria and procedures for granting clemency to convicted individuals. The updated framework marked a departure from prior practices, which had included pardons for individuals convicted of serious crimes. During her tenure, pardons were granted sparingly, and in 2015, no pardons were issued. These decisions received criticism from some entities, including the Ministry of Justice and prisoner advocacy groups.

=== Combating Islamic extremism and radicalization ===
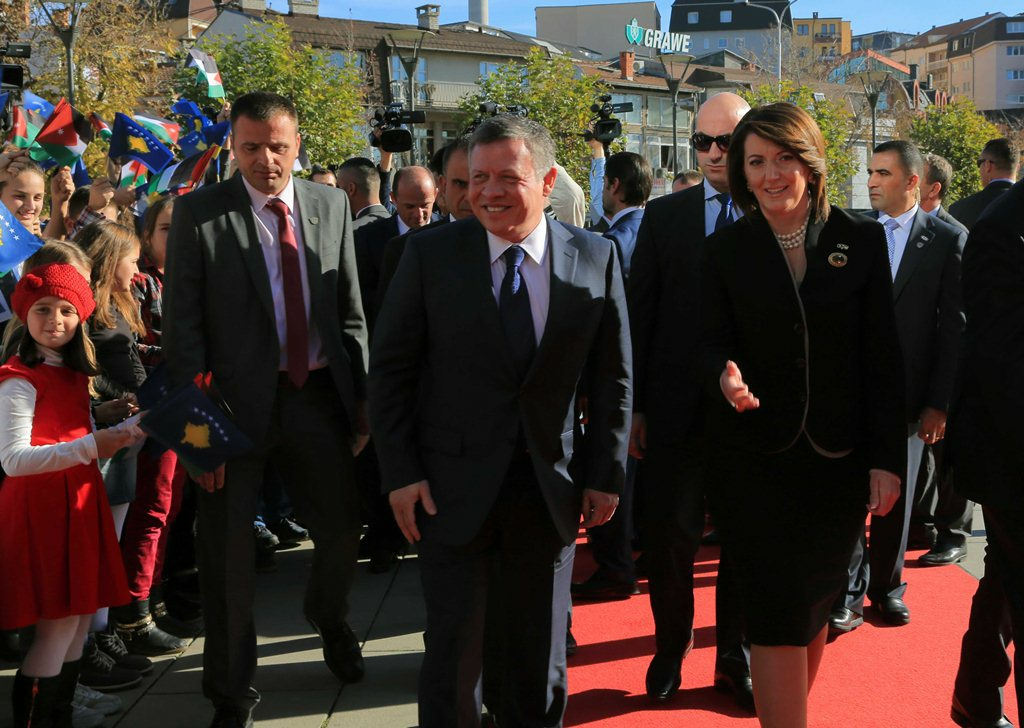
Jahjaga and King Abdullah II of Jordan

During the political deadlock in 2014, Kosovo faced increasing concerns regarding the involvement of some of its citizens in armed conflicts in the Middle East, as the number of individuals joining extremist groups abroad rose. In response to these developments, President Jahjaga engaged national security institutions to address the issue of violent extremism and radicalization. Coordinated efforts led to the arrest of several individuals suspected of recruiting for extremist groups.

As part of international efforts to counter violent extremism, President Jahjaga was invited to participate in a United Nations Security Council session in September 2014, where a resolution was adopted aimed at strengthening global responses to terrorism and radicalization.

In March 2015, Jahjaga decreed the law prohibiting the participation of Kosovo citizens in foreign armed conflicts, as part of legislative measures intended to curb extremist activities and enhance national security. The law was accompanied by additional preventative measures against radical and extremist activities within Kosovo.

The United States and the European Union acknowledged Kosovo's role in supporting the international coalition against the Islamic State and praised its commitment to addressing violent extremism and terrorism.

=== Attracting foreign investments ===
President Jahjaga undertook efforts to establish international partnerships and promote Kosovo as a potential destination for foreign investment. She emphasized the importance of cooperation between government institutions and the private sector in improving business practices, with the aim of increasing economic competitiveness and attracting investors.

In 2015, President Jahjaga signed an agreement for a €22 million donation from Sheikha Bint Mubarak of the United Arab Emirates. The donation was designated for the construction of a Pediatric Surgical Hospital at the University Clinical Center of Kosovo.

=== Women's empowerment ===
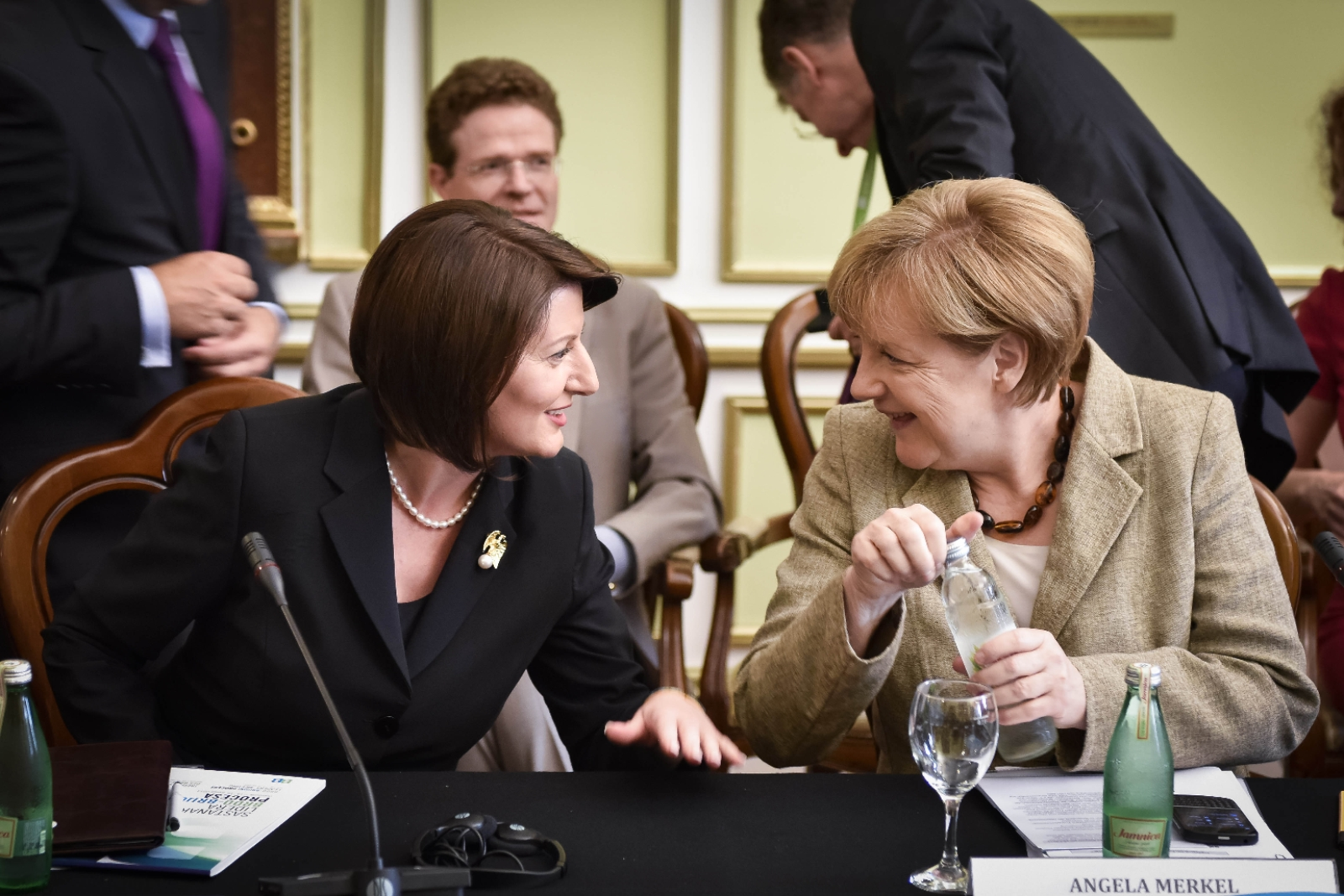
Jahjaga with German Chancellor Angela Merkel

During President Jahjaga’s term in office, initiatives were undertaken to promote the role of women in Kosovo. In 2012, she hosted the International Women's Summit titled "Partnership for Change—Empowering Women," which gathered approximately 200 participants, including leaders and representatives from Kosovo, Europe, North America, Africa, and the Middle East. The summit resulted in the formulation of the Pristina Principles, a set of recommendations supporting women's rights to political participation, economic inclusion, and access to justice and security.

In May 2012, Jahjaga became a member of the Council of Women World Leaders, a network of current and former women presidents and prime ministers committed to advancing women's leadership globally. She has also participated in international conferences addressing women's roles in public life and decision-making.

=== Reconciliation and tolerance ===
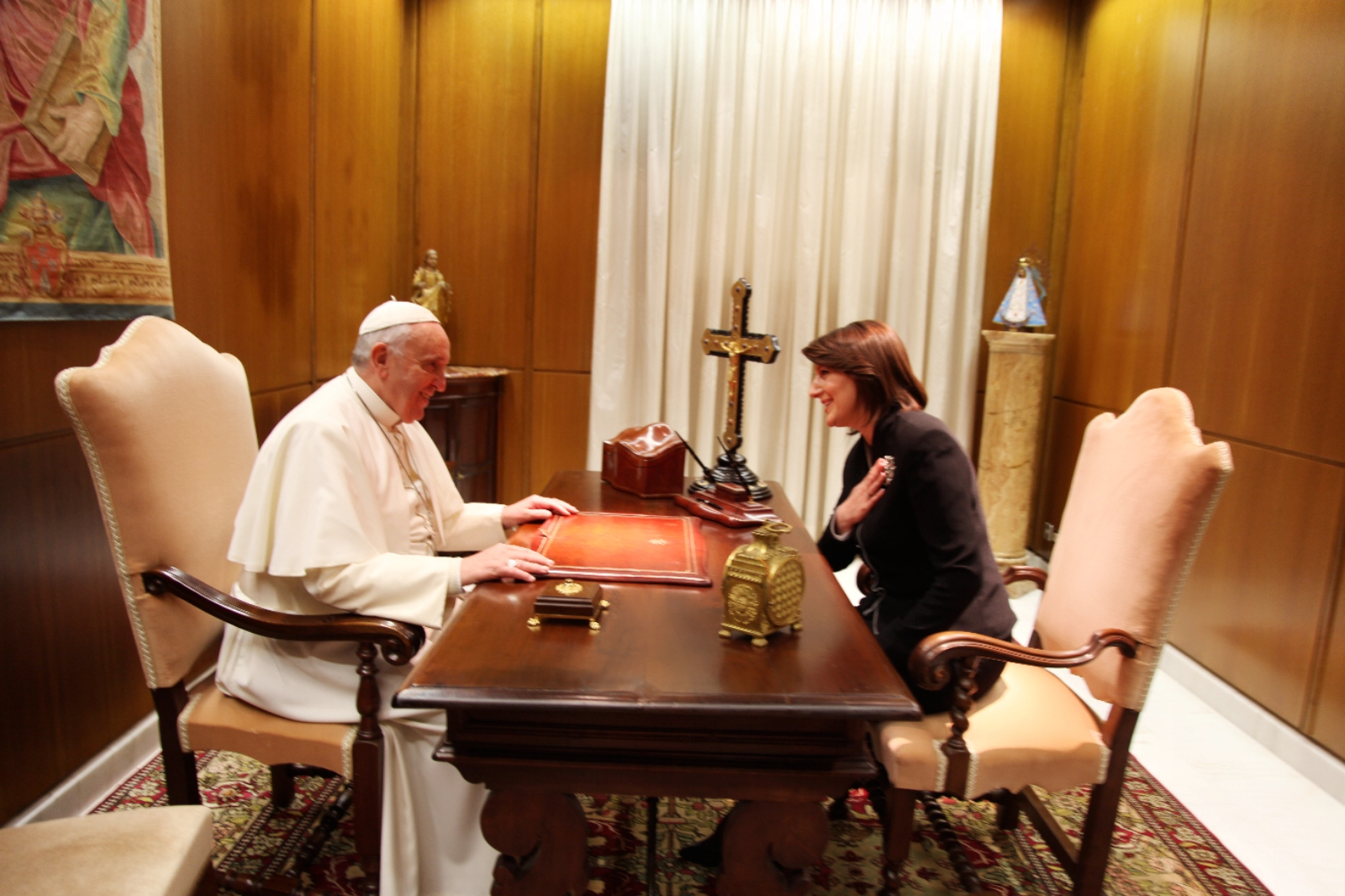
Jahjaga was received at the holy see in the Vatican by Pope Francis

During her time in office, President Jahjaga undertook efforts to promote communication and cooperation among Kosovo’s ethnic communities. She participated in interfaith dialogue and held outreach activities with minority groups. In 2013, she visited the Serbian Orthodox Monastery of Dečani during Easter celebrations, where she encouraged continued inter-religious tolerance in Kosovo.

She also led the Consultative Council for Communities, which proposed recommendations aimed at improving the situation of non-majority communities in areas such as education, economic development, employment, and social inclusion. The Council addressed concerns regarding the treatment of communities and promoted inclusive policies.

=== Preventing sexual violence in conflict ===
President Jahjaga was involved in efforts to support survivors of sexual violence during the Kosovo conflict. In March 2014, she established the National Council for Survivors of Sexual Violence During the War, a body composed of representatives from government institutions, civil society, and international organizations, with the purpose of coordinating legal and social support for survivors.

In June 2015, Kosovo-born artist Alketa Xhafa-Mripa organized an art installation titled Thinking of You in Pristina to raise awareness and show solidarity with survivors. The initiative, supported by Jahjaga, invited citizens to donate dresses as symbols of support, and the installation received international media attention.

=== Millennium Challenge Corporation ===
Millennium Challenge Corporation (MCC) logo.

President Jahjaga was involved in efforts to make Kosovo eligible for the U.S. Government's Millennium Challenge Corporation (MCC) development funds.

In February 2015, she established a working group led by the Office of the President of Kosovo, collaborating with national institutions and UN specialized agencies in Kosovo to enhance policy performance across 20 independent and objective indicators, including economic freedoms, democratic rights, control of corruption, good governance, and investment in people.

On November 6, 2015, the MCC announced that Kosovo had passed the MCC scorecard for the first time with 13 out of 20 indicators, showing a 16% improvement in the Control of Corruption indicator compared to the previous year.

At its quarterly meeting on December 16, 2015, the Millennium Challenge Corporation Board of Directors voted to make Kosovo eligible for a compact, a large-scale investment program.

== Office of the President of Kosovo ==
During President Jahjaga's mandate, the Office of the President consistently ranked as the most trusted institution by the citizens of Kosovo. As the first consensual and non-partisan President in the history of independent Kosovo, Jahjaga focused on the de-politicization of the Office of the President, ensuring that it remained open to all citizens and political parties. The role of the President was viewed as a unique position for inter-institutional coordination, which helps increase transparency and the effectiveness of institutions in fulfilling their mandates, while also maintaining the constitutional separation of powers.

Jahjaga maintained a modest lifestyle throughout her tenure. She and her cabinet were recognized by the Anti-Corruption Agency as a model of transparency and accountability for public officials. Jahjaga's Cabinet of Advisers consists of non-partisan and experienced professionals, many of whom were educated at prestigious U.S. and European universities.

== The Jahjaga Foundation ==
The Jahjaga Foundation is a non-governmental organization founded by Atifete Jahjaga in March 2018. The primary goal of the Jahjaga Foundation is the democratic development of Kosovo and the Balkans, focusing on social inclusion and support for marginalized groups as a foundation for peacebuilding in the region.

== Countries visited ==
List of state visits made
| | Country | Year | Cities visited | Type of visit |
|---|---|---|---|---|
| 1 | Albania | 2011, 2012 | Tirana, Durrës, Pogradec | Working visit |
| 2 | Austria | 2012, 2013, 2014 | Vienna, Alpbach | State visit Working visit |
| 3 | Belgium | 2011, 2012, 2013 | Brussels | Working visit |
| 4 | Bulgaria | 2015 | Sofia | Working visit |
| 5 | Croatia | 2011, 2012, 2015 | Zagreb, Dubrovnik | Official visit Working visit |
| 6 | Czech Republic | 2011 | Prague | Working visit |
| 7 | France | 2015 | Paris | Working visit |
| 8 | Germany | 2011, 2014 | Berlin, Munich | Working visit |
| 9 | Holy See | 2015 | Vatican | Working visit |
| 10 | Honduras | 2014 | Tegucigalpa | State visit |
| 11 | Hungary | 2011 | Budapest | State visit |
| 12 | Italy | 2011, 2015 | Rome, Venice | Official visit |
| 13 | Jordan | 2014, 2015 | Amman, Petra, Dead Sea | Official visit, Working visit |
| 14 | Lithuania | 2011 | Vilnius | Working visit |
| 15 | North Macedonia | 2011 | Ohrid | Working visit |
| 16 | Malaysia | 2013 | Kuala Lumpur | Working visit |
| 17 | Montenegro | 2012, 2015 | Budva | Working visit |
| 18 | Netherlands | 2013 | The Hague, Amsterdam | Working visit |
| 19 | Panama | 2014 | Panama City | State visit |
| 20 | Poland | 2011 | Warsaw | Working visit |
| 21 | Romania | 2014 | Bucharest | Working visit |
| 22 | Senegal | 2014 | Dakar | Working visit |
| 23 | Slovakia | 2013 | Bratislava | Working visit |
| 24 | Slovenia | 2011, 2015 | Ljubljana, Portorož | Official visit Working visit |
| 25 | Switzerland | 2015 | Bern, Zürich | Official visit |
| 26 | Turkey | 2012, 2013, 2014 | Istanbul | Working visit |
| 27 | United Arab Emirates | 2012, 2014, 2015 | Abu Dhabi, Dubai | Official visit Working visit |
| 28 | United Kingdom | 2013, 2014, 2015 | London, Durham, Leicester | Working visit |
| 29 | United States | 2012, 2013, 2014 | Washington, D.C., New York, Des Moines | Working visit |

== Bilateral meetings with foreign officials ==
List of bilateral meetings with foreign dignitaries, Heads of State, Heads of Parliaments, Prime Ministers and Foreign Ministers
| | Country | Dignitary |
|---|---|---|
| 1 | Albania | Meeting with President of the Republic of Albania, Bujar Nishani [2012, 2013, 2014, 2015] Meeting with President of the Republic of Albania, Bamir Topi [2011, 2012] Meeting with the Prime Minister of the Republic of Albania, Edi Rama [2013] Meeting with the Prime Minister of the Republic of Albania, Sali Berisha [2011, 2012] |
| 2 | Armenia | Meeting with Foreign Minister of Armenia, Eduard Nalbandyan [2014, New York] |
| 3 | Austria | Meeting with President of Austria, Heinz Fischer [2012, 2013, 2014, 2015] Meeting with Speaker of the Austrian Parliament, Barbara Prammer [2013] Meeting with Chancellor of Austria, Werner Faymann [2014] Meeting with Minister of Foreign Affairs of Austria, Sebastian Kurz [2015] |
| 4 | Bahamas | Meeting with Minister of Foreign Affairs, Frederick Mitchel [2014] |
| 5 | Belgium | Meeting with Minister of Foreign Affairs, Steven Vanackere [2011] |
| 6 | Botswana | Meeting with Minister of Foreign Affairs, Phandu Skelemani [2014] |
| 7 | Brazil | Meeting with Minister of Strategic Affairs, Marcelo Neri [2014] |
| 8 | Bulgaria | Meeting with President of Bulgaria, Rosen Plevneliev [2012, 2014, 2015] |
| 9 | Costa Rica | Meeting with President of Costa Rica, Laura Chinchilla [2014] |
| 10 | Croatia | Meeting with President of Croatia, Kolinda Grabar-Kitarović [2015] Meeting with President of Croatia, Ivo Josipović [2011, 2012, 2013] Meeting with Speaker of the Parliament of Croatia, Boris Šprem [2012] Meeting with Speaker of the Parliament of Croatia, Luka Bebić [2011] Meeting with Prime Minister of Croatia, Zoran Milanović [2012] Meeting with Minister of Foreign Affairs, Vesna Pusić [2012] |
| 11 | Czech Republic | Meeting with Minister of Foreign Affairs, Karel Schwarzenberg [2011] |
| 12 | Denmark | Meeting with Minister for European Affairs, Nicolai Wamman [2012] |
| 13 | Egypt | Meeting with Minister for European Affairs, Mohammed Amr [2012] |
| 14 | El Salvador | Meeting with Minister for European Affairs, Jaime Miranda Flamenco [2014] |
| 15 | Estonia | Meeting with President of Estonia, Toomas Hendrik Ilves [2012] |
| 16 | Europe | Meeting with President of the European Council, Herman van Rompuy [2011, 2012, 2013] Meeting with President of the European Parliament, Jerzy Buzek [2011] Meeting with President of the European Commission, Jose Manuel Barroso [2011, 2012] Meeting with EUHR, Federica Mogherini [2015] Meeting with EUHR, Catherine Ashton [2011, 2012, 2013, 2014] |
| 17 | Finland | Meeting with President of Finland, Tarja Halonen [2011] |
| 18 | France | Meeting with President of France, François Hollande [2013, 2015] Meeting with Minister of Foreign Affairs of France, Laurent Fabius [2014] |
| 19 | Germany | Meeting with President of Germany, Joachim Gauck [2013] Meeting with Chancellor of Germany, Angela Merkel [2014] Meeting with Minister of Foreign Affairs, Frank-Walter Steinmeir [2015] Meeting with Minister of Foreign Affairs, Guido Westerwelle [2011, 2012] |
| 20 | Ghana | Meeting with Minister of Foreign Affairs, Hanna Serwaa Tetteh [2014] |
| 21 | Guatemala | Meeting with President of Guatemala, Otto Pérez Molina [2014, Panama City] |
| 22 | Vatican City | Meeting with Pope Francis [2015, Vatican City] Meeting with Secretary of State of the Holy See, Cardinal Pietro Parolin [2014, New York] |
| 23 | Honduras | Meeting with President of Honduras, Juan Orlando Hernandez Alvarado [2014, Tegucigalpa] Meeting with President of Honduras, Porfirio Lobo Sosa [2011, Prishtina] |
| 24 | Hungary | Meeting with President of Hungary, Pal Schmitt [2011, Budapest] Meeting with Speaker of the Parliament of Hungary, Laslo Kover [2011] Meeting with Prime Minister of Hungary, Viktor Orban [2011, 2015] |
| 25 | Iceland | Meeting with President of Iceland, Ólafur Ragnar Grímsson [2012, Abu Dhabi] |
| 26 | Iraq | Meeting with Vice President of Iraq, Ayad Allawi [2015, Jordan] |
| 27 | Italy | Meeting with President of Italy, Giorgio Napolitano [2011, Rome] Meeting with Acting President of Italy, Pietro Grasso [2015, Rome] Meeting with President of the Chamber of Deputies of Italy, Laura Boldrini [2015, Rome] |
| 28 | Jordan | Meeting with HM King Abdullah of the Hashemite Kingdom of Jordan [2013, 2014, 2015] Meeting with HM Queen Rania of Jordan [2013] |
| 29 | Lithuania | Meeting with President of Lithuania, Dalia Grybauskaitė [2011, Vilnius] Meeting with Minister of Foreign Affairs, Audronius Ažubalis [2011] |
| 30 | Luxembourg | Meeting with Grand Duke of Luxembourg Henri [2014, Prishtina] Meeting with Prime Minister of Luxembourg, Xavier Bettel [2014, New York] |
| 31 | North Macedonia | Meeting with President of Macedonia, Gjorge Ivanov [2011, 2012, 2013, 2014] Meeting with Speaker of the Parliament of Macedonia, Trajko Veljanovski [2012] Meeting with Deputy Prime Minister of Macedonia, Musa Xhaferi [2015] |
| 32 | Malaysia | Meeting with HM King of Malaysia, Abdul Halim Mu'adzam Shah [2013, Kuala Lumpur] Meeting with Prime Minister of Malaysia, Najib Razak [2013] |
| 33 | Montenegro | Meeting with President of Montenegro, Filip Vujanović [2011, 2012, 2013, 2014, 2015] |
| 34 | Morocco | Meeting with Prime Minister of Morocco, Abdelilah Benkirane [2013] |
| 35 | Netherlands | Meeting with His Royal Highnesses King Willem-Alexander of the Netherlands [2013] Meeting with Prime Minister of Netherlands, Mark Rutte [2013] Meeting with President of the Senate, Ankie Broekers-Knol [2013] Meeting with Speaker of the House of Representatives, Anouchka van Miltenburg [2013] |
| 36 | Pakistan | Meeting with President of Pakistan, Mamnoon Hussain [2014, Ankara] Meeting with Prime Minister of Pakistan, Nawaz Sharif [2013, London] |
| 37 | Panama | Meeting with President of Panama, Ricardo Martinelli [2014] |
| 38 | Poland | Meeting with President of Poland, Bronisław Komorowski [2011] |
| 39 | Portugal | Meeting with Minister of Defense, José Pedro Aguiar-Branco [2011, 2012, 2014] |
| 40 | Romania | Meeting with President of Romania, Traian Basescu [2014, Bucharest] |
| 41 | Senegal | Meeting with President of Senegal, Macky Sall [2014, Dakar] |
| 42 | Serbia | Meeting with President of Serbia, Tomislav Nikolić [2013, Brussels] |
| 43 | Seychelles | Meeting with Minister of Foreign Affairs, Jean Paul Adam [2014] |
| 44 | Singapore | Meeting with Minister of Foreign Affairs, K. Shanguman [2014] |
| 45 | Slovakia | Meeting with President of Slovakia, Andrej Kiska [2014, New York] Meeting with Minister of Foreign Affairs, Miroslav Lajcak [2013, 2014] |
| 46 | Slovenia | Meeting with President of Slovenia, Borut Pahor [2013, 2014, 2015] Meeting with President of Slovenia, Danilo Turk [2011] Meeting with Speaker of the Parliament of Slovenia, Pavel Gantar [2011] |
| 47 | South Sudan | Meeting with Minister of Foreign Affairs, Barnaba Marial Benjamin [2014] |
| 48 | Sweden | Meeting with the Speaker of the Parliament of Sweden, Urban Ahlin [2015] |
| 49 | Switzerland | Meeting with President of Switzerland, Simonetta Sommaruga [2015] Meeting with President of Switzerland, Didier Burkhalter [2014] Meeting with President of Switzerland, Ueli Maurer [2013] |
| 50 | Turkey | Meeting with President of Turkey, Abdullah Gül [2012] Meeting with Speaker of the Turkish Grand National Assembly, Cemil Çiçek [2013] Meeting with Minister of Foreign Affairs, Ahmet Davutoğlu [2012, 2013] |
| 51 | United Arab Emirates | Meeting with Crown Prince of Abu Dhabi, HH Mohammed bin Zayed Al Nahyan [2012, 2013, 2014] Meeting with Minister of Foreign Affairs, HH Abdullah Bin Zayed Al Nahyan [2012, 2014] |
| 52 | United Kingdom | Meeting with Queen Elizabeth II [2015] Meeting with Charles, Prince of Wales [2013] Meeting with UK Parliament Lord Speaker, Baroness D'Souza [2013] Meeting with Speaker of the House of Commons, John Bercow [2013] Meeting with UK Prime Minister, David Cameron [2013] Meeting with UK Foreign Secretary, Philip Hammond [2015] Meeting with UK Foreign Secretary, William Hague [2012, 2013, 2014] |
| 53 | United States | Meeting with U.S. President, Barack Obama [2011, 2012, 2014] Meeting with U.S. Vice President, Joe Biden [2011, 2013] Meeting with U.S. Secretary of State, Hillary Clinton [2011, 2012, 2013] Meeting with U.S. Permanent Representative to the United Nations, Ambassador Samantha Power [2014] Meeting with U.S. Assistant Secretary for Europe, Victoria Nuland [2014, 2015] |
| 54 | Vietnam | Meeting with Vice President of Vietnam, Nguyen Thi Doan. [2015] |

== Honours and awards ==
=== Honours ===
- Italy
  - (Kingdom of the Two Sicilies) Two Sicilian Royal Family: Recipient of the Two Sicilian Royal Sacred Military Constantinian Order of Saint George Benemerenti Medal, 1st Class
  - (Kingdom of the Two Sicilies) Two Sicilian Royal Family: Knight Grand Cross of the Royal Order of Francis I
- Panama
  - Honorary citizen of Panama City

=== Awards ===
27 June 2013 - Honoris Causa from the University of Durham.

21 September 2014 - Leadership in Public Service Award from the Clinton Global Initiative.

16 July 2015 - Honorary degree of Doctor of Laws from the University of Leicester.

== See also ==
- Ismet Asllani

Political offices
| Preceded by Jakup Krasniqi; Acting | President of Kosovo; 2011–2016 | Succeeded by Hashim Thaçi |
