= Taipei Representative Office, Budapest =

Taiwanese de facto embassy

Taipei Representative Office in Hungary 駐匈牙利臺北代表處 Magyarországi Tajpej Képviseleti
Agency overview
- Formed: April 1990 (as Taipei Trade Office)
- Jurisdiction: Hungary; Bosnia and Herzegovina; Kosovo; Montenegro; Romania; Serbia
- Headquarters: Rákóczi út 1–3, Budapest, Hungary
- Agency executive: Elliot Wang, Representative
- Website: Taipei Representative Office in Hungary

The Taipei Representative Office in Hungary (Chinese: 駐匈牙利臺北代表處; pinyin: Zhù Xiōngyálì Táiběi Dàibiǎo Chù) (Hungarian: Magyarországi Tajpej Képviseleti) represents the interests of Taiwan in the Republic of Hungary in the absence of formal diplomatic relations, functioning as a de facto embassy. Its counterpart in Taiwan is the Hungarian Trade Office in Taipei.

The aim of the representative office is to further bilateral cooperation between Hungary and Taiwan in the fields of economics, culture, education and research. In addition, it offers consular services and the consular jurisdiction of the office also extends to Bosnia and Herzegovina, Kosovo, Montenegro, Romania and Serbia.

== Background ==
The Republic of China and Austria-Hungary established relations in 1913, but broke off in 1917. When Hungary was in the Axis powers it recognized the Japanese puppet states of Manchukuo and the Chinese State in Nanking. However, Hungary and the ROC never resumed full relations as the Soviet-backed Hungarian People's Republic recognized the newly established People's Republic of China on October 3, 1949, two days after it was declared.

The current representative office was opened in 1990 as Taipei Trade Office just one year after the collapse of communist rule in Hungary, becoming the first representative office to be established in Central and Eastern Europe. In 1995, the name of the office was changed to Taipei Representative Office and it officially began operations on January 6, 1996. The government affairs team, consular affairs team, economic team, and news team were successively set up to be responsible for related affairs of the office. The Ministry of Economic Affairs of Taiwan and the Information Bureau of the Executive Yuan also sent staff to work together.

Since September 2020, the office is headed by a representative, currently Shih-chung Liu, a senior foreign policy adviser to former President of Taiwan Chen Shui-bian.

== See also ==
- List of diplomatic missions of Taiwan
- List of diplomatic missions in Hungary
