= Adem Salihaj =

Albanian politician

Acting Prime Minister of Kosovo
- In office 8 March 2005 – 25 March 2005
- Preceded by: Ramush Haradinaj
- Succeeded by: Bajram Kosumi

Deputy Prime Minister of Kosovo
- Succeeded by: Lutfi Haziri

Personal details
- Born: December 25, 1950 (age 75) Duraj, Kačanik, SFR Yugoslavia (now Kosovo)
- Party: Democratic League of Kosovo
- Education: University of Pristina
- Occupation: Politician, journalist

Adem Salihaj (born 25 December 1950) is a Kosovar Albanian politician who was a former deputy prime minister of Kosovo and was the acting prime minister of Kosovo from 8–25 March 2005. He represented the Democratic League of Kosovo.

Salihaj was born in the Duraj village of Kaçanik. He studied Albanian language and literature in the Faculty of Philosophy of the University of Pristina. He worked for several years as a journalist of Bota e re (New world) newspaper and for the Radio Television of Pristina. Due to his political activities he was processed in court five times, imprisoned three times by the Yugoslav authorities, and spent a total of 12 years in jail. He was a signatory of the Kosovo Declaration of Independence.

Salihaj claims to have been the victim of an assassination attempt on June 12, 2000 which he believes was orchestrated by Kosovo's National Intelligence Service with the approval of Hashim Thaci.

In 2005, Salihahj was accused by the opposition Democratic Party of Kosovo and the ORA of being involved in organized crime. Salihaj and Speaker Nexhat Daci were removed from their posts in March 2006 after the death of Ibrahim Rugova and went on to form the Democratic League of Dardania.
