= Prime Minister of Kosovo =

Head of government

Prime Minister of the Republic of Kosovo
- Kryeministri i Republikës së Kosovës (in Albanian); Премијер Pепубликe Косово (in Serbian)
- National Emblem

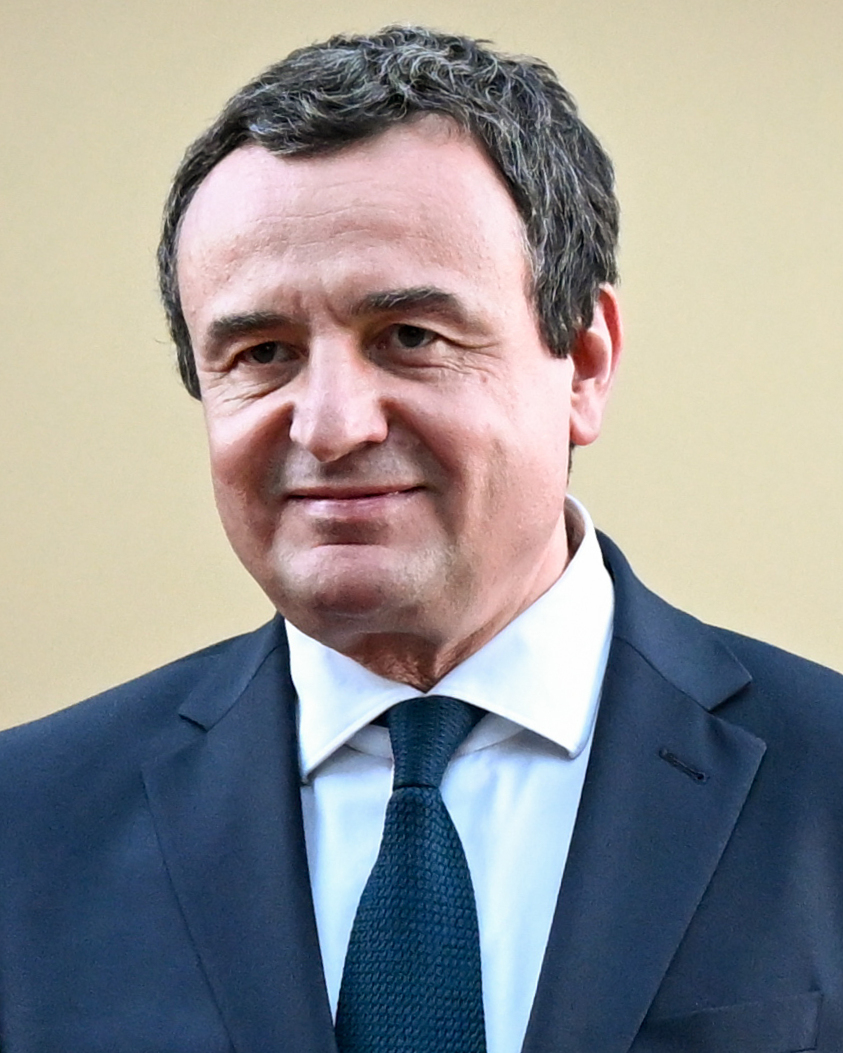
- Incumbent; Albin Kurti since 22 March 2021
- Executive branch of the Government of Kosovo
- Style: His Excellency
- Member of: Assembly of Kosovo
- Nominator: President of Kosovo
- Appointer: Assembly of Kosovo
- Term length: Four years; Renewable
- Inaugural holder: Jusuf Zejnullahu (de jure); Bajram Rexhepi (de facto)
- Formation: 7 September 1990 (de jure); 4 March 2002 (de facto)
- Salary: €1,500 monthly
- Website: in Albanian in Serbian in English

The prime minister of the Republic of Kosovo (Albanian: Kryeministri i Republikës së Kosovës, Serbian: Премијер Републике Косово, romanized: Premijer Republike Kosovo) is the head of government of the partially recognized Republic of Kosovo.

The prime minister and the Government of Kosovo, which they head, are responsible for their actions to the Assembly of Kosovo, of which they must all be members. The current prime minister of Kosovo is Albin Kurti, who assumed office on 22 March 2021.

== Officeholders ==
=== Prime ministers ===
Political parties: LDK PDK AAK Independent Vetëvendosje

No.	Portrait	Name (Birth–Death)	Term of office			Political party	Election
No.	Portrait	Name (Birth–Death)	Took office	Left office	Time in office	Political party	Election
Republic of Kosova
1	Jusuf Zejnullahu	Jusuf Zejnullahu (born 1944)	7 September 1990	5 October 1991	1 year, 28 days	LDK	—
2	Bujar Bukoshi	Bujar Bukoshi (1947–2025)	5 October 1991	1 February 2000	8 years, 119 days	LDK	—
—	Hashim Thaçi	Hashim Thaçi (born 1968) Provisional Prime Minister; In opposition	2 April 1999	1 February 2000	305 days	PDK	—
UN-administered Kosovo
3	Bajram Rexhepi	Bajram Rexhepi (1954–2017)	4 March 2002	3 December 2004	2 years, 274 days	PDK	2001
4	Ramush Haradinaj	Ramush Haradinaj (born 1968)	3 December 2004	8 March 2005	95 days	AAK	2004
—	Adem Salihaj	Adem Salihaj (born 1950); Acting	8 March 2005	25 March 2005	17 days	LDK	—
5	Bajram Kosumi	Bajram Kosumi (born 1960)	25 March 2005	10 March 2006	350 days	AAK	—
6	Agim Çeku	Agim Çeku (born 1960)	10 March 2006	9 January 2008	1 year, 305 days	Independent	—
7	Hashim Thaçi	Hashim Thaçi (born 1968)	9 January 2008	17 February 2008	39 days	PDK	2007
Republic of Kosovo
(7)	Hashim Thaçi	Hashim Thaçi (born 1968)	17 February 2008	9 December 2014	6 years, 295 days	PDK	2007; 2010
8	Isa Mustafa	Isa Mustafa (born 1951)	9 December 2014	9 September 2017	2 years, 274 days	LDK	2014
(4)	Ramush Haradinaj	Ramush Haradinaj (born 1968)	9 September 2017	3 February 2020	2 years, 147 days	AAK	2017
9	Albin Kurti	Albin Kurti (born 1975)	3 February 2020	3 June 2020	121 days	LVV	2019
10	Avdullah Hoti	Avdullah Hoti (born 1976)	3 June 2020	22 March 2021	292 days	LDK	—
(9)	Albin Kurti	Albin Kurti (born 1975)	22 March 2021	Incumbent	5 years, 239 days	LVV	2021; Dec. 2025; 2026

=== Deputy prime ministers ===
The deputy prime minister of the Republic of Kosovo (Albanian: Zëvendëskryeministri i Republikës së Kosovës, Serbian: Заменик премијера Републике Косово, romanized: Zamenik premijera Republike Kosovo) is the deputy head of government of Kosovo. In the absence of the prime minister, a deputy prime minister assumes the functions of chairman of the cabinet. The office is the second-highest ranking position in the executive branch of the Government of Kosovo within the country's parliamentary system.

The position of deputy prime minister did not exist when Kosovo's Provisional Institutions of Self-Government institutions were established in 2002. During the UNMIK period, the first elected government – the Cabinet of Bajram Rexhepi (4 March 2002 – 3 December 2004) – consisted only of the prime minister and ministers. No deputy prime minister was appointed.

The office was created for the first time on 3 December 2004, when the First Haradinaj cabinet took office. Adem Salihaj of the Democratic League of Kosovo (LDK) became the first deputy prime minister. He continued in the role during the subsequent Kosumi cabinet (2005–2006). In the Çeku cabinet (formed 10 March 2006), Lutfi Haziri (also LDK) replaced Salihaj as the single deputy prime minister.

The practice of having more than one deputy prime minister began on 9 January 2008 — still during the UNMIK administration and more than a month before Kosovo's declaration of independence on 17 February 2008. In the Second Thaçi cabinet, two deputy prime ministers were appointed simultaneously: Hajredin Kuçi (PDK) and Ramë Manaj (LDK). This marked the start of the multi-deputy model, which has been the norm ever since.

After Kosovo declared independence and adopted its Constitution in 2008, the legal framework explicitly allowed for one or more deputy prime ministers. Article 92 states that "The Government consists of the Prime Minister, deputy prime minister(s) and ministers." Since then, nearly every cabinet has included two to five deputy prime ministers, usually reflecting coalition agreements between political parties. The number and specific responsibilities of the deputies (e.g., for dialogue with Serbia, European integration, or national minority issues) are decided by the prime minister when forming the government and are approved by the Assembly of Kosovo.

Today, the deputy prime ministers are senior members of the cabinet who support the prime minister in coordinating government policy and often hold additional ministerial portfolios. The position remains an important tool for political balance in Kosovo's multi-party coalitions.

Political parties: PDK LDK AKR SLS SL NISMA Vetëvendosje AAK Guxo NDS KDTP

No.	Portrait	First deputy prime minister (Birth–Death)	Term of office		Portrait	Deputy prime minister (Birth–Death)	Term of office	
UN-administered Kosovo
Haradinaj cabinet
1		Adem Salihaj (born 1950)	3 December 2004	8 March 2005	No second deputy prime minister was appointed			
Kosumi cabinet
(1)		Adem Salihaj (born 1950)	25 March 2005	10 March 2006	No second deputy prime minister was appointed			
Çeku cabinet
2		Lutfi Haziri (born 1969)	10 March 2006	9 January 2008	No second deputy prime minister was appointed			
Republic of Kosovo
Second Thaçi cabinet
3		Hajredin Kuçi (born 1971)	9 January 2008	15 April 2011		Ramë Manaj (born 1954)	9 January 2008	18 October 2010
Third Thaçi cabinet
4		Behgjet Pacolli (born 1951)	15 April 2011	9 December 2014		Mimoza Kusari-Lila (born 1975)	22 February 2011	2 October 2013
4		Behgjet Pacolli (born 1951)	15 April 2011	9 December 2014		Hajredin Kuçi (born 1971)	22 February 2011	9 December 2014
4		Behgjet Pacolli (born 1951)	15 April 2011	9 December 2014		Bujar Bukoshi (1947–2025)	22 February 2011	9 December 2014
4		Behgjet Pacolli (born 1951)	15 April 2011	9 December 2014		Edita Tahiri (born 1956)	22 February 2011	9 December 2014
4		Behgjet Pacolli (born 1951)	15 April 2011	9 December 2014		Slobodan Petrović (born 1969)	22 February 2011	9 December 2014
Mustafa cabinet
5		Hashim Thaçi (born 1968)	9 December 2014	7 April 2016		Kujtim Shala (born 1964)	9 December 2014	24 August 2016
(3)		Hajredin Kuçi (born 1971)	2 June 2016	9 September 2017		Branimir Stojanović	9 December 2014	9 September 2017
(3)		Hajredin Kuçi (born 1971)	2 June 2016	9 September 2017		Ramiz Kelmendi (born 1958)	27 October 2016	9 September 2017
Second Haradinaj cabinet
(4)		Behgjet Pacolli (born 1951)	9 September 2017	3 February 2020		Enver Hoxhaj (born 1969)	9 September 2017	3 February 2020
(4)		Behgjet Pacolli (born 1951)	9 September 2017	3 February 2020		Fatmir Limaj (born 1971)	9 September 2017	3 February 2020
(4)		Behgjet Pacolli (born 1951)	9 September 2017	3 February 2020		Dardan Gashi (born 1969)	9 September 2017	3 February 2020
(4)		Behgjet Pacolli (born 1951)	9 September 2017	3 February 2020		Dalibor Jevtić (born 1978)	9 September 2017	3 February 2020
First Kurti cabinet
6		Avdullah Hoti (born 1976)	3 February 2020	25 March 2020		Haki Abazi (born 1974)	3 February 2020	3 June 2020
Hoti cabinet
7		Besnik Tahiri (born 1975)	3 June 2020	22 March 2021		Driton Selmanaj (born 1979)	3 June 2020	22 March 2021
7		Besnik Tahiri (born 1975)	3 June 2020	22 March 2021		Albulena Balaj-Halimaj (born 1983)	3 June 2020	22 March 2021
7		Besnik Tahiri (born 1975)	3 June 2020	22 March 2021		Goran Rakić (born 1971)	3 June 2020	22 March 2021
Second Kurti cabinet
8		Besnik Bislimi (born 1971)	22 March 2021	11 February 2026		Donika Gërvalla-Schwarz (born 1971)	22 March 2021	11 February 2026
8		Besnik Bislimi (born 1971)	22 March 2021	11 February 2026		Emilija Redžepi (born 1973)	22 March 2021	26 August 2025
Third Kurti cabinet & Fourth Kurti cabinet
9		Glauk Konjufca (born 1981)	11 February 2026	Incumbent		Donika Gërvalla-Schwarz (born 1971)	11 February 2026	Incumbent
9		Glauk Konjufca (born 1981)	11 February 2026	Incumbent		Fikrim Damka (born 1972)	11 February 2026	Incumbent

== See also ==
- President of Kosovo
- Special Representative of the Secretary-General for Kosovo
- President of the Executive Council of SAP Kosovo
