= Memli Krasniqi =

Kosovar Albanian politician

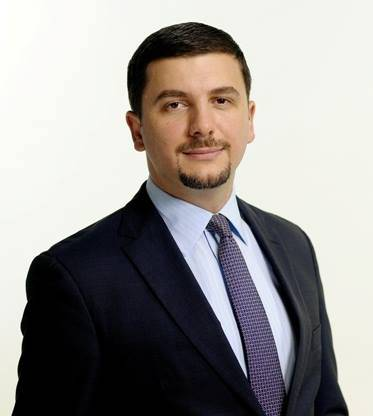

Leader of the Democratic Party of Kosovo
- In office 3 July 2021 – 17 November 2025
- Preceded by: Enver Hoxhaj
- Succeeded by: Bedri Hamza

Leader of the Opposition
- In office 3 July 2021 – 17 November 2025
- Preceded by: Enver Hoxhaj
- Succeeded by: Bedri Hamza

Deputy Speaker of the Assembly
- In office 26 December 2019 – 22 March 2021
- Preceded by: Xhavit Haliti
- Succeeded by: Bedri Hamza

Minister of Culture, Youth and Sports
- In office 22 February 2011 – 9 December 2014
- Preceded by: Lutfi Haziri
- Succeeded by: Kujtim Shala

Personal details
- Born: 25 January 1980 (age 46) Pristina, Yugoslavia (now Pristina, Kosovo)
- Party: Democratic Party of Kosovo
- Education: London School of Economics, University of Pristina
- Occupation: Politician

Memli Krasniqi (born 25 January 1980) is a Kosovar politician. Krasniqi has previously been Minister of Culture, Youth and Sports (2011–2014), Minister of Agriculture, Forestry and Rural Development (2014–2017), and most notably Chairman of the Democratic Party of Kosovo (PDK) between 2021 and 2025.

== Early life and education ==
Memli Krasniqi was born in Pristina, where he finished the "Hasan Prishtina" primary school and the "Xhevdet Doda" gymnasium. He graduated with a BA in Political Science and Public Administration in the Faculty of Philosophy of the University of Prishtina and obtained an MSc degree in International Relations from the London School of Economics and Political Science (LSE).

During 1999 and 2000, he worked as a journalist for the American news agency Associated Press and in 2002 he served as a Director for Public Relations at the Telemedicine Centre of Kosovo.

For many years he was active in the music industry and worked in different musical projects, mostly as a songwriter and a member of the hip-hop group Ritmi i Rrugës.

== Political career ==
Krasniqi was actively engaged in politics with the PDK since 2004, initially leading the Centre for Political Studies within the cabinet of the Chairman of the party, Hashim Thaçi.

Upon the establishment of PDK's Cabinet for Good Governance, Krasniqi was appointed to lead the Department of Youth and in October 2006 he was elected the Chairman of the Democratic Youth of Kosovo - the youth organization of PDK that represented its members aged 16–30. From this position, he was also a member of the Presidency of PDK. In February 2013, Krasniqi was elected a Vice-President of PDK.

In the 2007 parliamentary elections, Krasniqi was elected a Member of the Assembly of Kosovo and served as a member in the Committee for Education, Science, Culture, Youth and Sports. In October 2008 he was appointed a Political Adviser to the Prime Minister and Spokesperson of the Government.

Krasniqi was re-elected to the Assembly of Kosovo in the 2010 parliamentary elections and was appointed Minister in the Ministry of Culture, Youth and Sports in February 2011. He was re-elected again in the 2014 parliamentary elections and was appointed Minister in the Ministry of Agriculture, Forestry and Rural Development in December 2014. Most recently he was re-elected in the 2017 parliamentary elections and has served as Chairman of the PDK caucus in the Assembly of Kosovo since September 2017.

== Personal life ==
Memli Krasniqi lives in Pristina with his wife Meliza and children Bora, Mal and Vera.
