= Hajredin Kuçi =

Kosovar Albanian politician

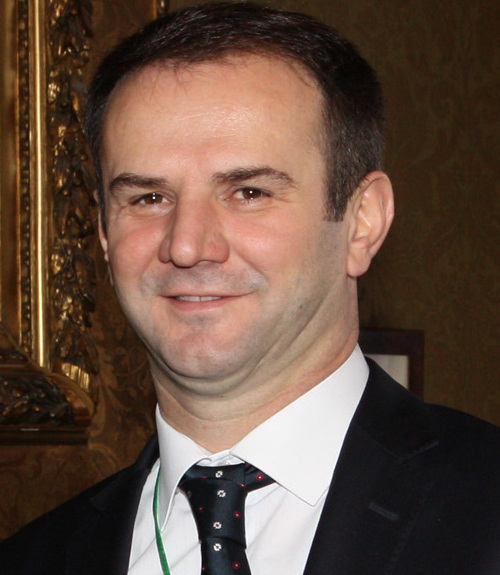
Kuçi in 2013

Signature of Kuçi

Hajredin Kuçi (born 2 January 1971 in Peć, Yugoslavia) is a Kosovar Albanian politician, who served as Deputy Prime Minister of Kosovo from 2008 to 2017 and as Minister of Justice from 2011 to 2016.

== Other works ==
He is the author of Kosova's Independence: Stabilising or Destabilising Factor published at Houston, Texas in 2005 by Ramiz Tafilaj's Jalifat Publishing.
