= Behgjet Pacolli =

President of Kosovo in 2011

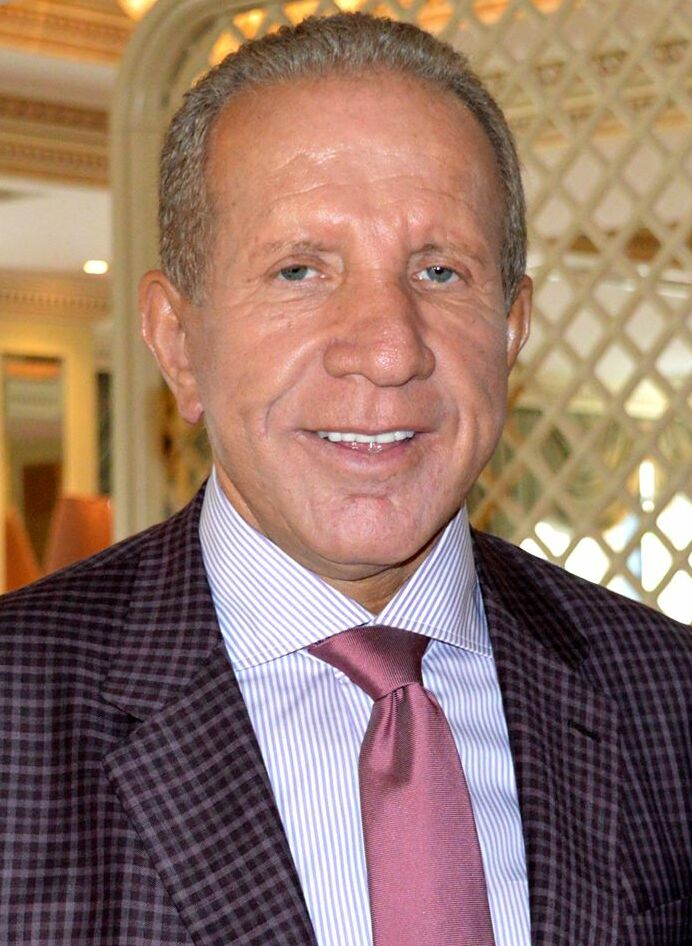
- Pacolli in 2015

President of Kosovo
- In office 22 February 2011 – 4 April 2011
- Prime Minister: Hashim Thaçi
- Preceded by: Jakup Krasniqi
- Succeeded by: Atifete Jahjaga

First Deputy Prime Minister of Kosovo
- In office 9 September 2017 – 3 February 2020
- Prime Minister: Ramush Haradinaj
- Preceded by: Hajredin Kuçi
- Succeeded by: Avdullah Hoti
- In office 15 April 2011 – 9 December 2014
- Prime Minister: Hashim Thaçi
- Preceded by: Hajredin Kuçi
- Succeeded by: Hashim Thaçi

Minister of Foreign Affairs
- In office 9 September 2017 – 3 February 2020
- Prime Minister: Ramush Haradinaj
- Preceded by: Emanuel Demaj (Acting)
- Succeeded by: Glauk Konjufca

Personal details
- Born: 30 August 1951 (age 75) Pristina, AR Kosovo and Metohija, FPR Yugoslavia (now Pristina, Kosovo)
- Citizenship: Kosovo; Switzerland
- Party: New Kosovo Alliance (2006–February 2011; April 2011–present)
- Other political affiliations: Independent (February–April 2011)
- Spouse: Masha Pacolli
- Children: 6
- Website: www.behgjetpacolli.com

Behgjet Isa Pacolli (Gheg Albanian: [bɛhˈɟɛt paˈtsoɫi]; born 30 August 1951) is a Kosovan and Swiss politician and businessman who was President of Kosovo and also served as the first deputy prime minister of Kosovo between 2011 and 2014. From 2017 to 2019, he also served as the Minister of Foreign Affairs in the government of Ramush Haradinaj. Pacolli was one of the signatories of the 2008 Kosovo declaration of independence.

He is the major shareholder of Mabetex Group, a Swiss-based construction and civil engineering company. Pacolli is also the president of the third biggest political party in Kosovo, the New Kosovo Alliance. He is among the world's wealthiest ethnic Albanians. Pacolli has also acted as a mediator in hostage recovery situations.

== Early life and education ==
Behgjet Pacolli is the son of Isa and Nazmije, the second of ten children. He completed his primary education in Marec and high school in Prishtina. He is Kosovo Albanian by ethnicity but has Swiss citizenship as well (which he received in 1992). After receiving his bachelor's degree from the Hamburg Institute of Foreign Trade in 1974, he completed his military service in the Yugoslav army. Afterward, he joined an Austrian company, for which he worked as a sales representative for ex-Yugoslavia, Bulgaria, Poland, and Russia. Two years later, he moved to Switzerland and joined a Swiss company he had gotten to know in Moscow.

Pacolli went to graduate school at the Mösinger Zurich Institute, where he received his master's degree in marketing and management. He speaks various foreign languages, including English, French, German, Italian, Russian, Spanish, and Serbian.

== Career ==
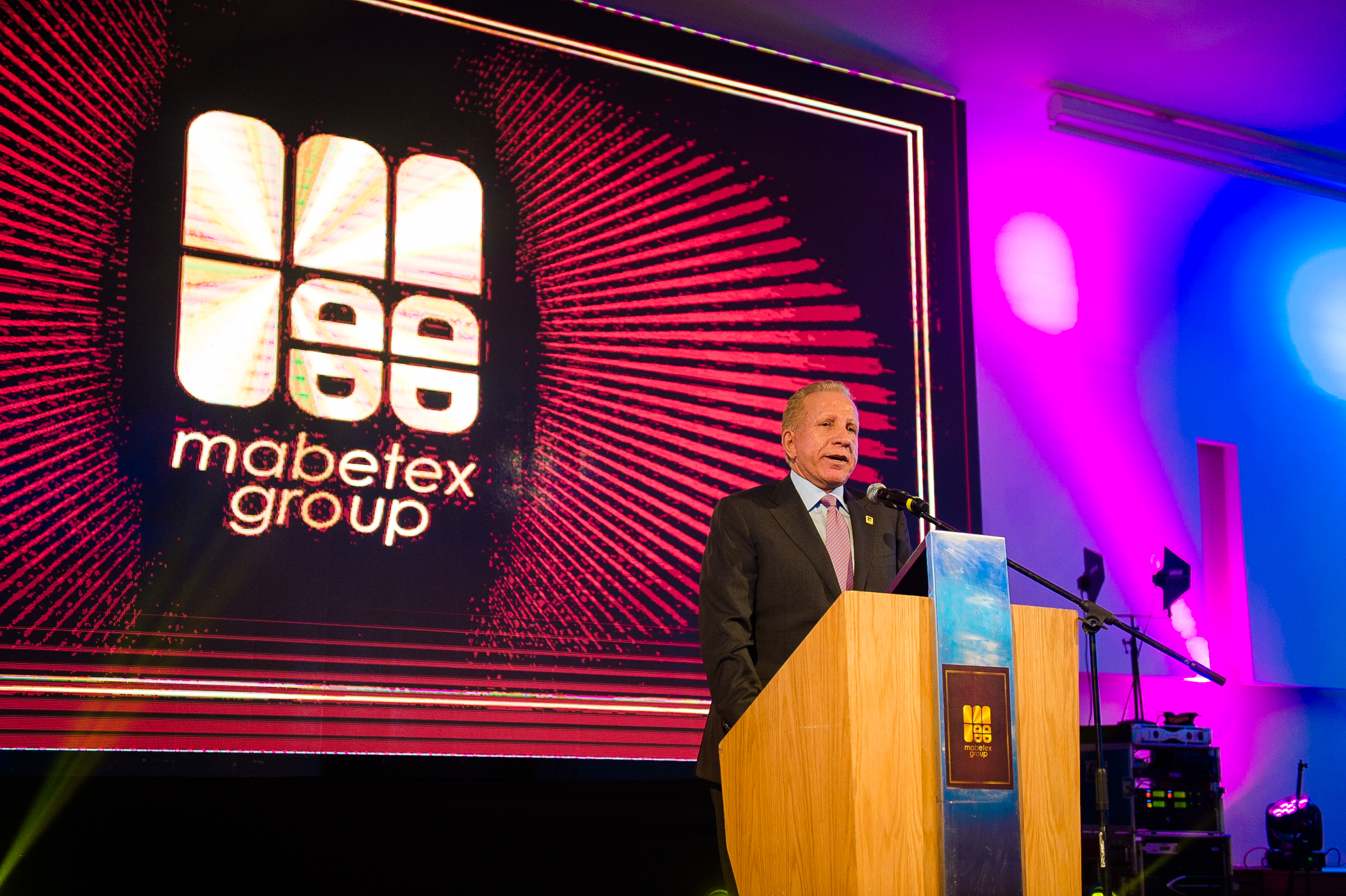
Behgjet Pacolli at the 25th anniversary of Mabetex Group

In 1974, Pacolli started his career as a foreign language correspondent and deputy director for development at the Textile Enterprise in Gjilan. He held this position until 1975, when he emigrated from Kosovo to move to the West, pursuing career opportunities.

From 1976 to 1980, Pacolli held several senior management positions in multiple companies, including commercial director for the regional development of the company Peter Zimmer in Kufstein, Austria, commercial director of Interplastica Project Engineering in Morbio Inferiore, Switzerland. Afterward, he was named general director at the same company (Interplastica).

In the fall of 1990, he founded Mabetex Project Management, a construction company based in Lugano, Switzerland, which has developed into a large business group now known as Mabetex Group, with interests in construction, banking, insurance, healthcare, media, design, etc. From 1992 to 1999, Pacolli's Mabetex worked on several projects in Russia during the Yeltsin era. The firm renovated the White House in Moscow, the State Duma Building, and the Kremlin. Pacolli was later accused of having bribed Yeltsin because he had guaranteed credit cards to the Yeltsin family. In early 1999, Swiss authorities opened an investigation and on 22 January 1999 searched the Mabetex office in Lugano; however the federal prosecutor's office dismissed the case against Pacolli in March 1999, as no incriminating evidence was found, partially due to a lack of cooperation from the Russian investigation of Pavel Borodin, the former Head of the Presidential Property Management Department of the Russian Federation.

At the end of the 1990s, during the Kosovo War, Pacolli organized humanitarian aid and donated money to relief. In 1999, he established the Foundation for the Organization and Reconstruction of Kosovo (FORK) in Lugano. Later, Pacolli began business activities in Kazakhstan, where he worked with Mabetex in constructing new buildings in Astana.

=== Lobbying for Kosovo independence ===
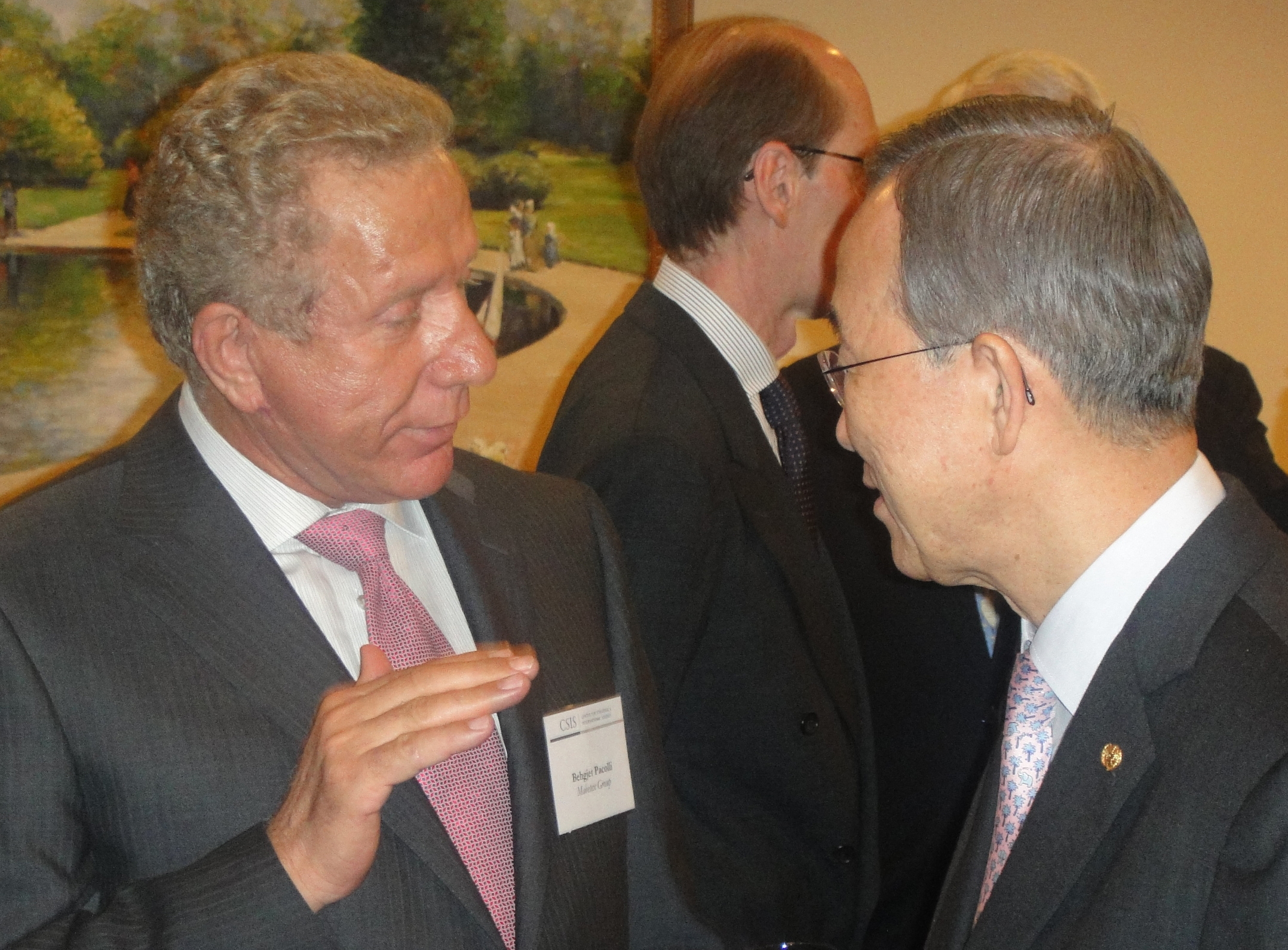
Pacolli and Ban Ki-Moon at the CSIS conference 2010

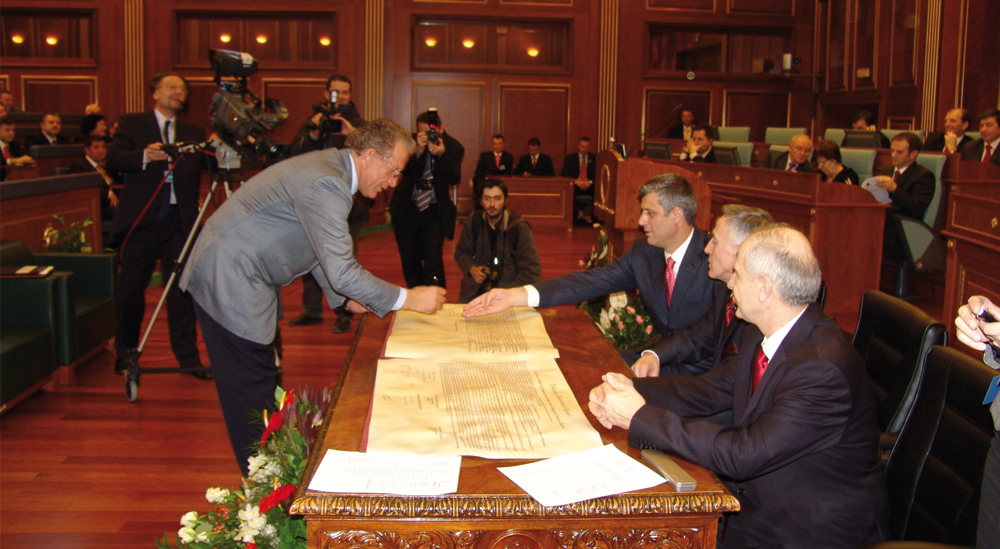
Behgjet Pacolli signing the 2008 Kosovo Declaration of Independence

Pacolli's commitment to improving the livelihood in his homeland continued after the Kosovo War ended. In 2005, he founded the lobbying company New Kosovo Alliance (AKR), through which he lobbied exclusively for the creation of the country of Kosovo. During this time, Pacolli collaborated with many important figures in world politics, primarily American elected officials and diplomats, including Frank Carlucci, Morton Abramowitz, S. Waterman, Zbigniew Brzezinski, Janusz Bugajski, Henry Kissinger, and many others. For four years, he was also a member of the board of trustees of the Center for International and Strategic Studies (CSIS), in the Committee led by Henry Kissinger, during which time he continued his lobbying efforts towards creating the appropriate conditions for declaring Kosovo an independent country.

The New Kosovo Alliance (AKR)'s lobbying mission was considered fulfilled by Pacolli and other members of the organization when the US President George W. Bush, during his visit to Tirana in June 2007, stated, "Kosovo must be a country, an independent republic, now."

Since Kosovo declared independence in February 2008, Pacolli has dedicated a significant amount of effort, time, and financial resources to advocating for the international community's formal recognition of Kosovo's sovereignty and independence. He has expanded his lobbying activities on an international level, while holding meetings with senior diplomats, politicians, and heads of state of many countries in an attempt to convince them to recognize Kosovo's independence.

=== New Kosovo Alliance ===
On 17 March 2006, the New Kosovo Alliance transformed its function into Kosovo's political party. In the 2007 elections, AKR became the third-strongest party by votes and led the parliamentary opposition in Kosovo, contributing its share to the declaration of Kosovo's independence on 17 February 2008. During this period, although in opposition, Pacolli continued to work towards achieving international recognition of Kosovo's independence.

Pacolli was elected a deputy in the Assembly of the Republic of Kosovo and was also named as a member of the Budget and Finance Committee. With his rise in Kosovo's politics, Pacolli was becoming widely perceived as a great asset not only to Kosovo's politics but also to the country's general development.

=== Presidency ===
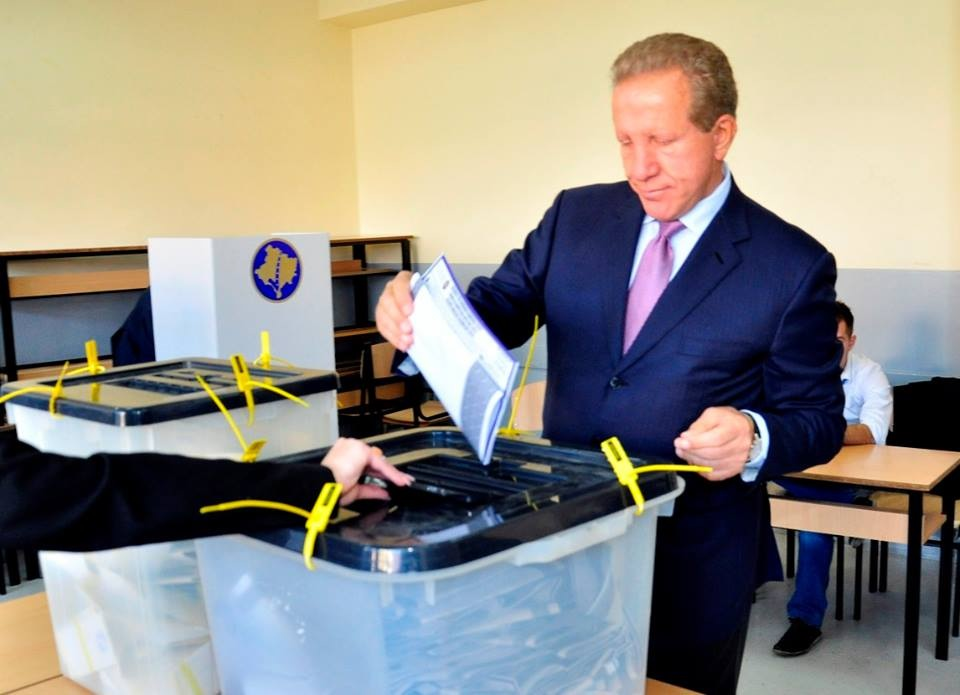
Pacolli voting in the 2010 Kosovan parliamentary election

On 22 February 2011, Pacolli was elected the 2nd president of the Republic of Kosovo.

In the early days in his new role, he made an official visit to the divided city of Mitrovica, while also crossing into Serb-majority North Kosovo to reaffirm Kosovo's authority and sovereignty in the area. Furthermore, Pacolli went on two out-of-the-country visits as the president of Kosovo, visiting the neighboring countries of Albania and Macedonia.

On 4 April 2011, he announced that he had stepped down from the role of the President of Kosovo (though without formally resigning), after the Constitutional Court of Kosovo had ruled that his election procedure had been irregular. Nicolas Mansfield, Director of Rule of Law programs for the East-West Management Institute (EWMI), explained that the Constitutional Court eventually declared Pacolli's election unconstitutional for two reasons. According to the Constitutional Court, the election of the country's president is considered formally valid and procedurally legitimate if at least two candidates run for the presidency, with at least 80 deputies (two-thirds of 120 members) voting in favour of a candidate. Several dissenting members of the Court issued dissenting opinions, disagreeing with the decision because it would allow a small minority of 41 deputies to prevent constitutional elections, which is inconsistent with the drafters of Kosovo's constitution. Ultimately, Pacolli's case assisted in improving Kosovo's score for Judicial Framework and Independence in the 2012 Nations in Transit report.

=== First Deputy Prime Minister ===
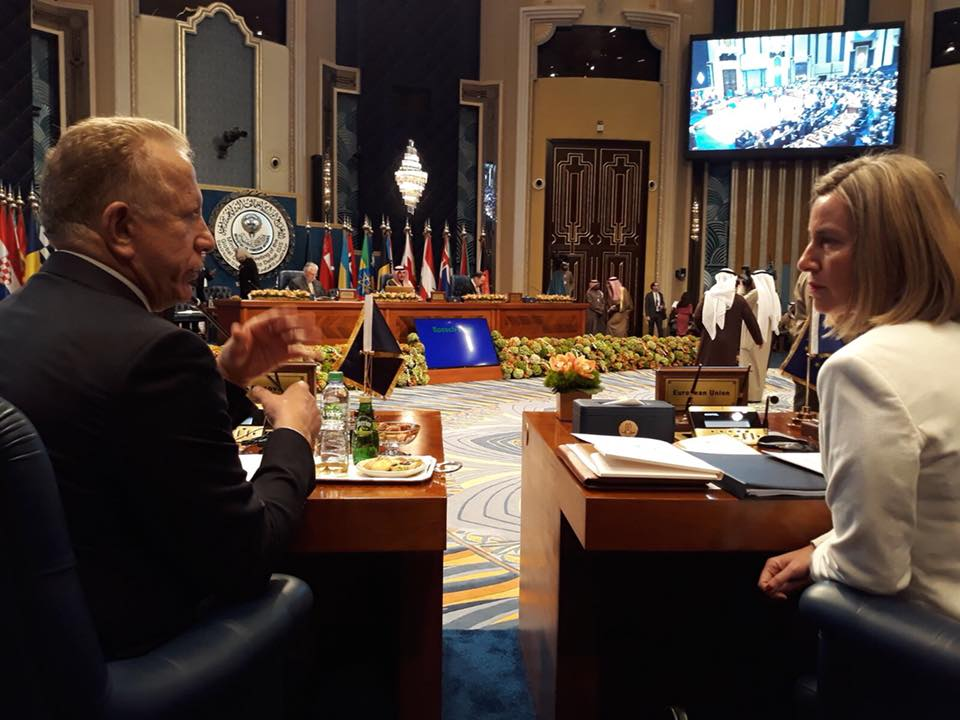
Behgjet Pacolli and Federica Mogherini

After his withdrawal from the president's office, Pacolli decided to continue the co-governance, being eventually promoted to the position of the first deputy prime minister of the Republic of Kosovo. During his time in office, possessing the authority to pursue other countries' recognition and foreign investments, he organized and led the lobbying campaign for the official recognition of Kosovo's independence and sovereignty, as well as the country's inclusion in the international community, which included high-level meetings and negotiations with more than 100 presidents, prime ministers, and monarchs of many different countries from across the entire world. In February 2015, Albanian President Bujar Nishani awarded Pacolli the Nderi i Kombit (English: Honor of the Nation) national award for his contribution to the recognition of Kosovo's independence and to the economic relationship between Kosovo and Albania. The award ceremony took place at the Presidential Palace in Tirana.

In late autumn 2017, Pacolli discussed establishing Serb Municipalities for the Serb minority in Kosovo with foreign policy and security chief Federica Mogherini and EU enlargement commissioner Johannes Hahn. Following the bilateral meeting with his Slovenian counterpart, Minister of Foreign Affairs of Slovenia Karl Erjavec, in December 2017, Pacolli successfully negotiated the establishment of a ministerial-level Committee for Economic Cooperation with Slovenia. Additionally, Pacolli has continuously supported the establishment of open and transparent economic relationships between Kosovo and Serbia. In this regard, several Serbian media outlets reported that Pacolli is in favor of abolishing the tax on goods from Serbia.

=== Deputy Prime Minister and Minister of Foreign Affairs ===
From September 2017 to February 2020, Pacolli served as Deputy Prime Minister and Minister of Foreign Affairs of the Republic of Kosovo. On 16 December 2019, Pacolli and his wife met with Pope Francis at the Holy See. Kosovar media reported that Pacolli and Pope Francis would discuss the peaceful coexistence between different communities and religions in Kosovo. Albanian news magazine Sot later wrote that Pacolli and Francis also talked about the Kosovo War. Pope Francis encouraged Masha Pacolli to continue working with women who were traumatized as a result of the armed conflict.

=== Since 2020 ===
On 26 November 2019, an earthquake struck Albania. As outgoing Kosovo Deputy Prime Minister, Pacolli and his family personally donated 1 million euros to the relief effort.

On 15 January 2021, Pacolli visited the destroyed village of Thumana with Albania's Prime Minister Edi Rama. Pacolli announced that he would further support relief and build a housing complex that comprises 80 apartments with a square footage of 100 m^{2} each.

== Hostage recovery activities ==
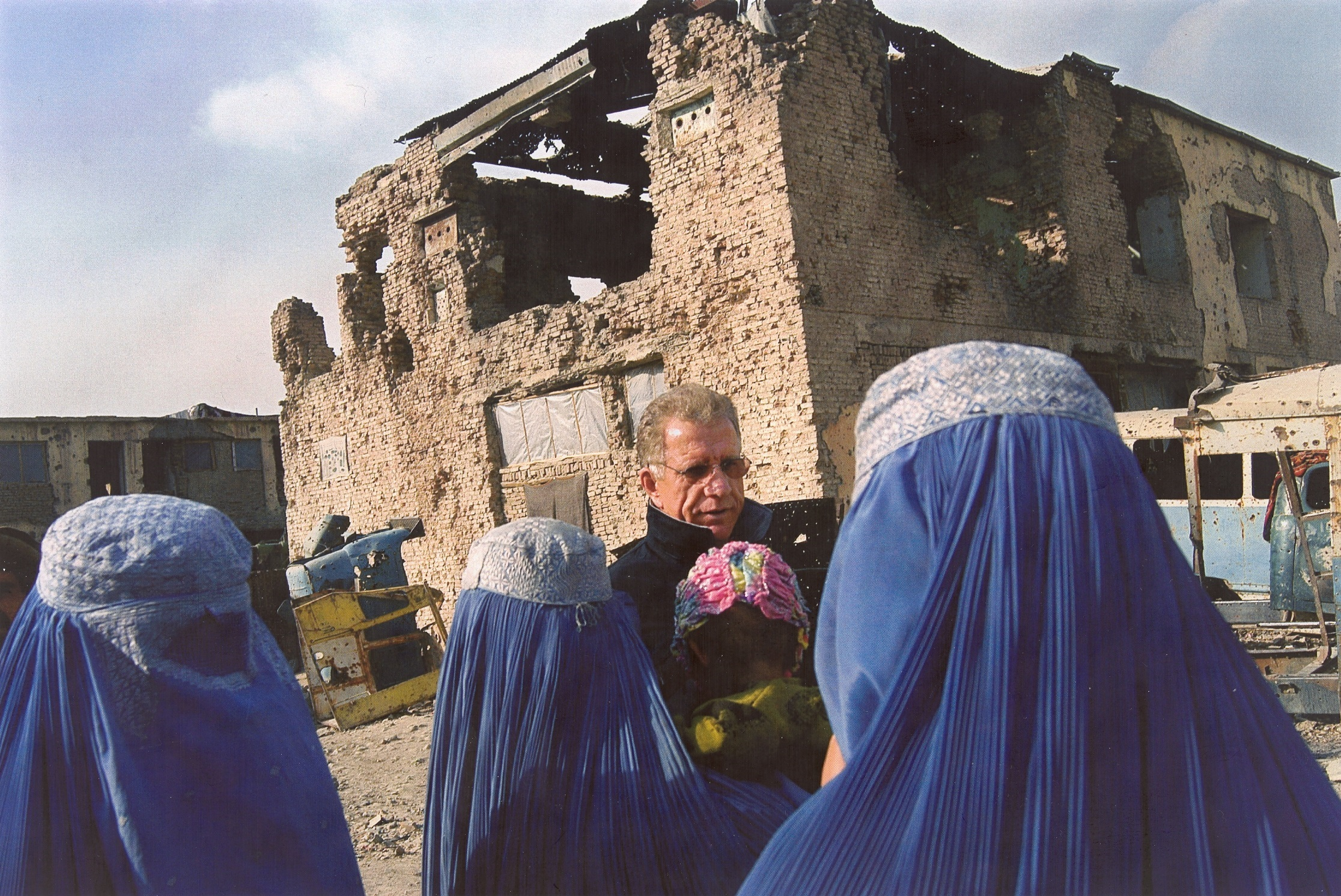
Pacolli in Afghanistan, 2004

Several times, Pacolli has been directly involved in the release of hostages in Afghanistan and in other countries undergoing conflicts. Assistant professor Dejan Lukić considers Pacolli to be one of the few agents who successfully negotiate the release of hostages with terrorists.

On 28 October 2004, after helping run a presidential election, three United Nations workers, Annette Flannigan, Angelito Nayan and Shqipe Hebibi, were taken hostage in Kabul. The latter originated from Kosovo and had neither representation nor support from other countries. Pacolli travelled to Afghanistan where he spent a month negotiating on their behalf. Pacolli has been credited with securing their release. On 23 November 2004, the hostages were released. In his 2017 book "The Trade", Jere van Dyk describes that Pacolli paid a ransom to a Taliban tribal leader.

In October 2006, the Italian photojournalist Gabriele Torsello was kidnapped in Afghanistan. Pacolli was contacted by an Italian intelligence agency in order to negotiate his liberation. Eventually, Pacolli was successful in negotiating Torsello's release, who was released on 3 November 2006 after 23 days in captivity.

In 2007, Pacolli negotiated the release of 23 South Korean Christian missionaries from Afghanistan. He managed to secure the release of 21 of them after 2 were executed.

On 19 July 2008, Swiss citizens Max Göldi and Rachid Hamdani were captured in Tripolis, Libya, and held as hostages. In early 2010, Pacolli negotiated with Muammar Ghaddafi and attempted to secure their release.

On 15 August 2011, American-Kosovar lobbyist James Berisha was arrested by the Eritrean police on a mission to recognise Kosovo's independence. Eritrean authorities believed that Berisha was an American spy, and he was imprisoned for five months. Berisha was discharged from prison after Pacolli travelled to Eritrea and negotiated his discharge.

== Philanthropy ==
Throughout his career in global business, Pacolli also developed philanthropic activities. His Behgjet Pacolli Foundation stimulates the education of youth in elite schools, helps the poor, builds schools, and hospitals, supports sports, culture, etc. In 1993, Pacolli established "Les Enfants du Sakha", presently known as "Ibrahim Kodra Foundation" a fund with the stated goal of providing help in the medical care, education and recreation of children. Just in Kosovo, the Behgjet Pacolli Foundation has donated over 20 million euros to various projects.

Pacolli has been the main sponsor of the Aleksandër Moisiu Foundation, and the "Bambimi Di Sakha" Orphanages Foundation. Since 1993, Pacolli has been financially supporting the hospital for the shelter and care of abandoned children born with physical disabilities in Sakha

Starting in 2006, Pacolli began donating for the construction and renovation of several buildings in Kosovo. First, the Parliament Building of Kosovo in Prishtina was renovated with Pacolli's help. Later, Pacolli funded the building of the American University in Kosovo campus. In 2008, he financed the reconstruction and restoration of the Mosque of Llap in Prishtina, a building which is enlisted as part of the cultural heritage of Kosovo. Pacolli financed the expansion and construction of the College of Philosophy within the University of Prishtina the next year. In 2017, Kosovar media reported that Pacolli proposed a twelve-point plan for a large-scale renovation of Prishtina.

== Honours and awards ==
- 2002 – 2006: Member of the Center for Strategic and International Studies, and permanent advisor to the committee led by Henry Kissinger
- 2002 – 2010: Honorary Diplomat of the State of Liberia
- 2009: Peace Ambassador of the Universal Peace Federation
- 2010: Cavalier del Millennio per la Pace ("Knight of Peace of the Millennium") of the Centro Nazionale per la pace, Italy
- 2010: Honorary Citizen of Lezha
- 2011: Gusi Peace Prize, Philippines
- 2012: Honorary Citizen of the City of Baton Rouge, Louisiana
- 2012: Chancellor's Gold Medal of the Community College in Baton Rouge, Louisiana
- 2012: Keys to the City of New Orleans and the State of Louisiana
- 2012: Honorary Citizen of Korça
- 2014: Special Leadership Award from the POLIS University for his life's work in politics, peace-building and humanitarian work
- 2015: "The Acknowledgement of the City of Tirana" honour, given by the mayor of Tirana, Lulzim Basha
- 2015: Kazakh President "2015 Constitution of Kazakhstan" Medal
- 2015: Nderi i Kombit, awarded by Bujar Nishani
- 2015: Albanian Honor of Nation Order
- 2016: Order of the Kazakh President Kurmet for services to the economy, science, culture, education and social affairs
- 2018: Doctor Honoris Causa in Economics, awarded by the Ismail Qemali University of Vlorë
- 2018: Honorary Citizen of Kukësi
- 2019: "Mother Teresa" High Award
- 2019: Acknowledgment from US President Bill Clinton
- 2022: Key to the city of Tirana
- Certificate of appreciation from the AUK (American University in Kosovo)
- Nelson Mandela Foundation Award
- Rochester Institute of Technology Honorary Degree
- Doctor honoris causa of European University of Tirana
- Honorary Citizen of Astana, Kazakhstan

== Publications ==
- Pacolli, Behgjet (2022). Një mision i parealizuar deri në fund (PDF) (in Albanian).
- Pacolli, Behgjet (2018). Nulla è impossibile: come ho costruito il mio successo (in Italian). Milano: Cairo. ISBN 978-88-6052-746-2. OCLC 1085598090.
- Pacolli, Behgjet (2017). 15 Parimet e Suksesit (PDF) (in Albanian). Prishtina: Korrik.
- Pacolli, Behgjet (2014). Të lobosh për Kosovën (PDF) (in Albanian). Tirana: Bota Shqiptare.
- Pacolli, Behgjet (2010). Nga sfida në sfidë: jeta, Behgjet Pacolli – këtë libër ja kushtoj të rinjve të Kosovës (PDF) (in Albanian). Tirana: Shtëpia Botuese Albanica. ISBN 978-9951-8735-5-0.
- Pacolli, Behgjet (2007). 2007 Kriza e pengjeve koreane në Afganistan Politikani nga Ballkani, Behgjet Pacolli, negocioi për lirimin e tyre (PDF) (in Albanian). Prishtina.

== Bibliography ==
- Nazarko, Mentor (2012). Ç'lloj Bashkimi? mbi hapësirën e përbashkët ekonomike Shqipëri-Kosovë: akte te forumit akademik nën kujdesin e z. Behgjet Pacolli ish-President i Republikës së Kosovës (PDF) (in Albanian). Tiranë. ISBN 978-99956-39-53-2. OCLC 847842539.

Political offices
Preceded by Jakup Krasniqi	President of Kosovo; 2011	Succeeded by Atifete Jahjaga
Preceded by Hajredin Kuçi	First Deputy Prime Minister of Kosovo; 2011–2014	Succeeded by Hashim Thaçi
Preceded by Hajredin Kuçi	First Deputy Prime Minister of Kosovo; 2017–2020	Succeeded by Avdullah Hoti
Preceded by Emanuel Demaj; Acting	Minister of Foreign Affairs; 2017–2020	Succeeded by Glauk Konjufca
