= Independent Liberal Party (Kosovo) =

Independent Liberal Party Самостална либерална странка, Samostalna liberalna stranka
- Leader: Slobodan Petrović
- Founded: 18 April 2006
- Ideology: Liberalism; Serbian minority interests
- Political position: Centre
- International affiliation: Liberal International
- Colours: Yellow, Blue
- Assembly: 0 / 120

Website
- www.sls-ks.org

The Independent Liberal Party (ILP, Serbian: Самостална либерална странка, Samostalna liberalna stranka, СЛС/SLS) was a political party in Kosovo, representing the Kosovo Serbs. It was founded in 2006, and participated in several electoral cycles. The party was headed by Slobodan Petrović. It was abolished in 2020.

== History ==
In the 2007 parliamentary election, the party won 3 out of 120 seats in the Transitional Assembly of Kosovo (Slobodan Petrović, Bojan Stojanović, Kosara Nikolić), with Petrović also being elected into the Presidency of the Assembly, while in January 2008 ILP also gained two ministerial posts in the Transitional Government of Kosovo (Boban Stanković, Nenad Rašić).

In February 2008, upon the Kosovo declaration of independence, ministers from ILP left the Government in protest, but returned to their posts already by the end of March.

In the 2010 parliamentary election, the party won 2.1% of the popular vote and 8 out of 120 seats. In February 2011, the ILP joined the coalition government of Hashim Thaçi, with ILP leader Slobodan Petrović becoming one of five deputy prime ministers. In the same time, ILP got three ministries: Local Self-Government (Slobodan Petrović), Communities and Return (Radojica Tomić), and Labor and Social Welfare (Nenad Rašić).

In the spring of 2014, a fraction led by minister Nenad Rašić splintered from ILP and formed the Progressive Democratic Party.

In the 2014 parliamentary election, the party joined the Serb List coalition that won 9 seats (4 seats for ILP candidates: Slobodan Petrović, Saša Milosavljević, Jelena Bontić, Jasmina Živković), while the separate electoral list of ILP won only 0.05% of the popular vote, and thus no additional seats.

In the 2017 parliamentary election, the party won 0.49% of the popular vote, and one seat (Slobodan Petrović).

In the 2019 parliamentary election, the ILP won only 0.22% of the popular vote, and got no seats.

The party was recognizing Kosovo's independence from Serbia. Its overall stance was liberal.
