= Cvetko Veljković =

Kosovo Serb politician

Cvetko Veljković Цветко Вељковић

Member of the Assembly of Kosovo
- Incumbent
- Assumed office 17 November 2022

Personal details
- Born: Štrpce, SAP Kosovo, SR Serbia, SFR Yugoslavia
- Party: ZSPO

Cvetko Veljković (Serbian Cyrillic: Цветко Вељковић, Albanian: Cvetko Veljkoviq) is a Kosovo Serb politician serving as a member of the Assembly of Kosovo since 17 November 2022. He is a member of the Civic Initiative for Freedom, Justice and Survival (GI SPO), which later became a party under the name For Freedom, Justice and Survival (ZSPO).

== Biography ==
Veljković was born in Štrpce, SAP Kosovo, SR Serbia, SFR Yugoslavia. He holds a degree in economy.

In May 2020, Veljković was appointed head of the Office for Communities by Prime Minister Albin Kurti, replacing Nenad Rašić who resigned earlier. Following his appointment, it was revealed that some years earlier Veljković had posted songs dedicated to Ratko Mladić on his Facebook account, raising controversy.

Veljković was an MP candidate of Civic Initiative for Freedom, Justice and Survival (GI SPO) in the 2021 Kosovan parliamentary election. On 3 February 2021, Veljković was detained by Kosovo police in Štrpce because the member of the local electoral commission Emran Avrdi accused him of making death threats towards him. During the election campaign, Veljković and Rašić, together with Albin Kurti, visited Štrpce. GI SPO only won 1,508 votes or 0.17% of the popular vote, hence Veljković failed to get elected to the Assembly of Kosovo. Veljković, however, managed to enter the Assembly on 17 November 2022 as a replacement for one of the Serb List (SL) MP's who resigned on 7 November 2022.
