= Nenad Rašić =

Kosovo Serb politician

- Ненад Рашић
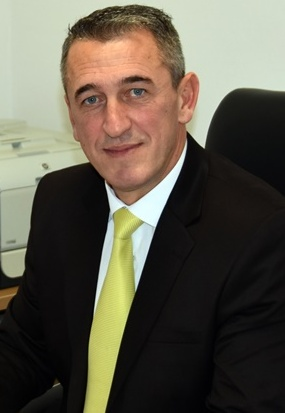
- Rašić in December 2022

Minister for Communities and Returns
- Incumbent
- Assumed office 1 December 2022 (Note: Caretaker 23 March 2025–11 February 2026)
- Prime Minister: Albin Kurti
- Preceded by: Goran Rakić

Member of the Assembly of Kosovo
- In office 17 July 2014 – 10 May 2017

Minister of Labor and Social Welfare
- In office 9 January 2008 – 9 December 2014
- Prime Minister: Hashim Thaçi
- Succeeded by: Safet Kamberi

Personal details
- Born: 27 January 1973 (age 53) Dobrotin, Lipljan, SAP Kosovo, SR Serbia, SFR Yugoslavia
- Party: SLS (2006–2013); PDS (2014–2024); SPO (2024–present)

Nenad Rašić (Albanian: Nenad Rashiq; born 27 January 1973) is a Kosovo Serb politician serving as the minister for communities and returns of Kosovo since 1 December 2022. Previously he served as the minister of labor and social welfare of Kosovo from 2008 to 2014 and as a member of the Assembly of Kosovo from 2014 to 2017.

Known for his moderate views, Rašić was one of the founders of the Independent Liberal Party (SLS) and its high-ranking member until his removal from the party in 2013. From 2014 to 2024, he was the president of the Progressive Democratic Party (PDS) which he led until he registered the For Freedom, Justice and Survival (SPO) party.

== Early life and career ==
Rašić was born on 27 January 1973 in Dobrotin, a village near Lipljan, in the SAP Kosovo, SR Serbia, SFR Yugoslavia. He finished high school in Lipljan and attended university studies in Priština and Belgrade. According to his official biography, Rašić holds a degree in economy. In 1997, he started working in the Coca-Cola bottling plant in Lipljan, where he worked as a salesman until the 1999 NATO bombing of Yugoslavia during the Kosovo War when the plant was shut down and never restored again.

Following the end of hostilities in Kosovo, Rašić worked as a translator for British KFOR troops and later for the International Organization for Migration.

== Political career ==
In 2006, he was one of the founders of the Independent Liberal Party (SLS), a minor party in Kosovo. On 9 January 2008, Rašić was appointed minister of labor and social welfare of Kosovo as part of the cabinet of Hashim Thaçi and served in this position until 2014. Rašić stated that the best period of the development of the "political being of Serbs" was from 2008 to 2012.

In May 2013, Rašić, along with few SLS MP's, formed a new parliamentary group in the Assembly of Kosovo. Shortly after, Rašić was expelled from SLS. In March 2014, Rašić founded the Progressive Democratic Party (PDS).

Following the 2014 parliamentary elections, PDS won 0.82% of the popular vote and Rašić was elected member of the Assembly of Kosovo as its sole MP. Shortly after, he joined the parliamentary group of the Serbian government-backed Serb List (SL). At the time of cooperation with the Serb List, he claimed that Serbs "simply have no other state, nor a higher authority than Belgrade" and criticized Albanian politicians for not implementing the Brussels Agreement. In 2015, Rašić was a candidate for mayor of Gračanica, finishing second to Vladeta Kostić of SL.

Progressive Democratic Party participated in the 2019 parliamentary elections as part of the Freedom Coalition (Koalicija Sloboda). The coalition initially included European Movement of Serbs in Kosovo led by former Serbian government minister Rada Trajković and the New Party of Kosovo led by Dragiša Mirić. Mirić's party left the alliance because of an election campaign video that Rašić recorded in Albanian language. This video was criticized by the Serb List and Serbian politicians. The coalition failed to gain any parliamentary seats, gaining only 0.08% of the popular vote.

On 2 April 2020, Prime Minister Albin Kurti appointed Rašić the director of the Office for Communities. On 23 April, Rašić resigned because of the indictment brought against him for alleged abuse of official duty and was succeeded by Cvetko Veljković.

On 22 February 2021, Rašić's teenage son was beaten up in his high school in Laplje Selo, with Albin Kurti calling this incident an "attack against Nenad Rašić".

Rašić endorsed the Civic Initiative for Freedom, Justice and Survival (GI SPO) for the 2021 parliamentary elections as he was unable to run as candidate due to the indictment against him. During the election campaign, Rašić and Cvetko Veljković, together with Albin Kurti, visited Štrpce. The list failed to get elected to the Assembly.

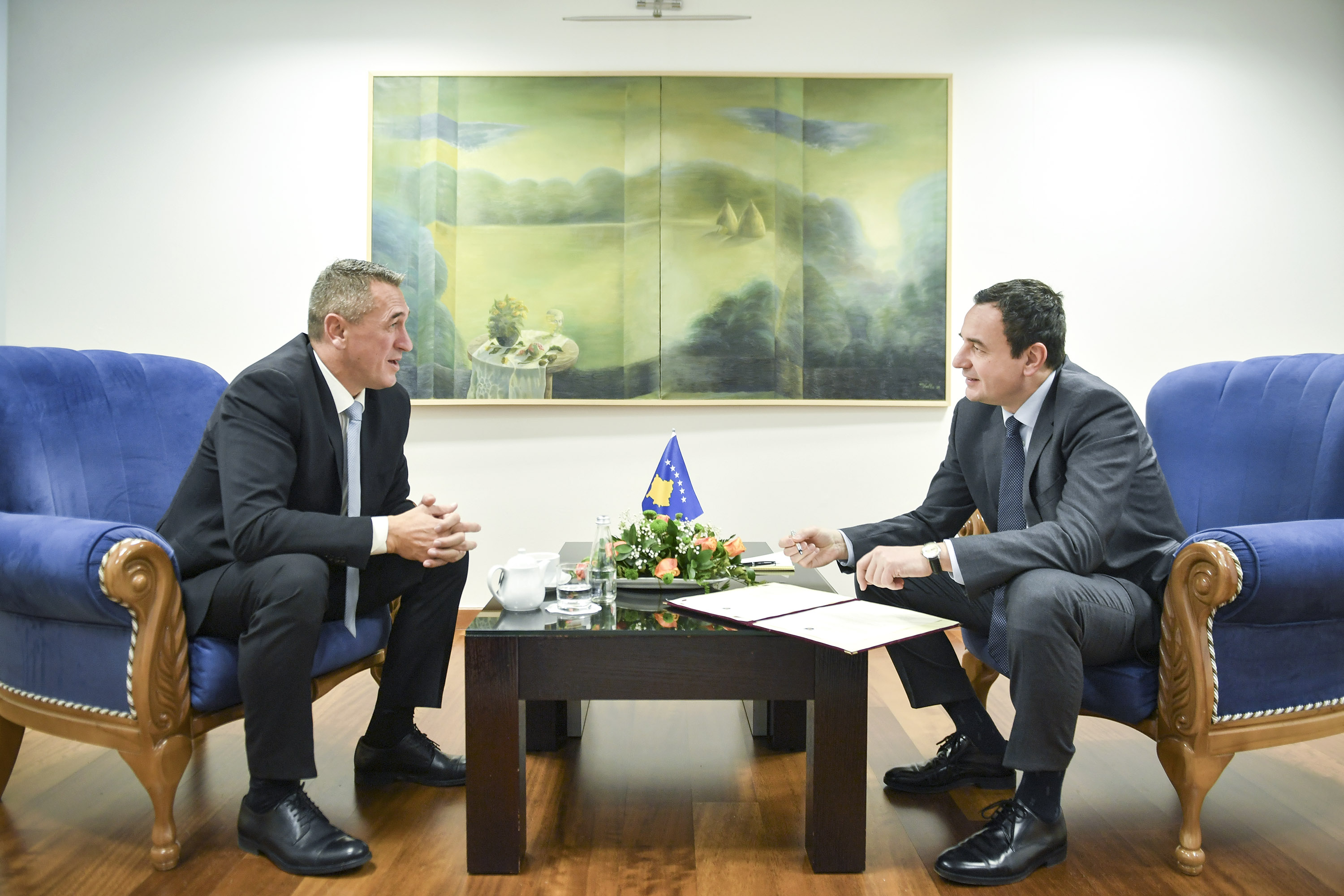
Rašić with Prime Minister Albin Kurti following his appointment as a government minister on 1 December 2022

On 8 November 2022, Rašić was acquitted of the charges for the abuse of official duty.

On 1 December 2022, Rašić was appointed minister for communities and returns by Albin Kurti after the post was left vacant for almost one month following the resignation of Goran Rakić and the Serb List's (SL) boycott of Kosovan institutions. Kurti stated that he always appreciated Rašić his "correctness and determination". Rašić announced that he will appoint Rada Trajković as his advisor. SL reacted with a statement that Rašić's appointment was unconstitutional as it wasn't approved by Serb MP's and announced that it will submit an appeal to the Constitutional Court of Kosovo. Director of the Office for Kosovo and Metohija Petar Petković called Rašić "Kurti's puppet". President of Serbia Aleksandar Vučić insulted Rašić and Trajković, calling them the "worst Serbian scum", adding that they "do not have anyone's trust in Serbia, but they have the trust of Albin Kurti and Western agencies". EU Spokesperson Peter Stano stated that EU's preliminary reading is that the appointment does not meet constitututional requirements, but that this is up to the Constitutional Court to determine.

On 14 December 2022, during a government session, Rašić was among the ministers who voted in favor for the construction of police bases in the municipality of Leposavić in the cadastral zone of Bistrica and the cadastral zone of Gornji Jasenovik in the municipality of Zubin Potok, both Serb-majority municipalities. In addition, Rašić also voted in favor of the formation of the organizing committee for the celebration of "15 years since the declaration of independence of Kosovo" and "25 years of the epic of the Kosovo Liberation Army (KLA)".

In May 2024, Rašić registered the For Freedom, Justice and Survival (SPO) party. In the February 2025 parliamentary election campaign, the Serb Democracy (SD) and its leader Aleksandar Arsenijević accused SPO of vote buying.

For the 2026 Serbian parliamentary election, Rašić endorsed the Student List.

== Personal life ==
Rašić is married and has a son. Besides his native Serbian, he speaks Albanian.

== Notes and references ==
=== References ===
Government offices
Preceded by Goran Rakić	Minister for Communities and Returns; 2022–present	Incumbent
Preceded by	Minister of Labor and Social Welfare; 2008–2014	Succeeded by Safet Kamberi
Party political offices
New political party	President of the Progressive Democratic Party; 2014–present	Incumbent
