= Slobodan Petrović =

Kosovo Serb politician

- Слободан Петровић
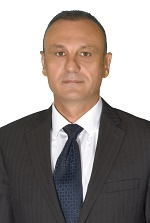

Deputy Prime Minister of Kosovo
- In office 22 February 2011 – 9 December 2014
- President: Atifete Jahjaga; Behgjet Pacolli
- Prime Minister: Hashim Thaçi

Minister of Local Government Administration
- In office 22 February 2011 – 9 December 2014
- President: Atifete Jahjaga; Behgjet Pacolli
- Prime Minister: Hashim Thaçi

Personal details
- Born: 21 December 1969 (age 56) Pristina, SAP Kosovo, SFR Yugoslavia (present–day Pristina, Kosovo)
- Party: Independent Liberal Party
- Spouse: Married

Slobodan Petrović (Serbian Cyrillic: Слободан Петровић, Albanian: Slobodan Petroviq; born 21 December 1969) is a Kosovo Serb politician and former Deputy Prime Ministers of the Republic of Kosovo. He was a member of the Kosovo Assembly and until 2020 he was the head of the Independent Liberal Party (SLS).

== Career ==
In September 2006, Petrović set up the Independent Liberal Party (SLS) in Kosovo. He stated that the aims of the party were to help Kosovo's Serb communities stay in Kosovo and to improve living conditions so as to secure a sustainable and realistic return of displaced Serbs.

On 8 February 2009, Petrović met with Albanian President Bamir Topi. They discussed about the situation in Kosovo and that Albania was a major factor towards stability in Kosovo. On 13 February 2009, Petrović was named "Personality of the Year" by a group of seven non-governmental organisations.

In the December 2010 Kosovan Parliamentary Elections, Petrović's party got 8 seats (2 main, 6 Serbs); with 14,352 votes (2.02%). On 20 February 2011, he signed a coalition agreement with Kosovar Prime Minister Hashim Thaçi. This coalition agreement made Petrović the Deputy Prime Minister of Kosovo. Also his party was in charge of three Government ministries; Local Self-Government Ministry, Communities and Return Ministry and Labour and Social Welfare Ministry. On 22 February 2011, Petrović was made one of five Deputy Prime Ministers of Kosovo. He was also made Minister for Local Government Administration.

For the 2014 elections he endorsed the Belgrade-backed Serb List.

His main platform in Kosovo politics is recognition of Kosovo independence by Serbia and Kosovo Serbs.

== Personal life ==
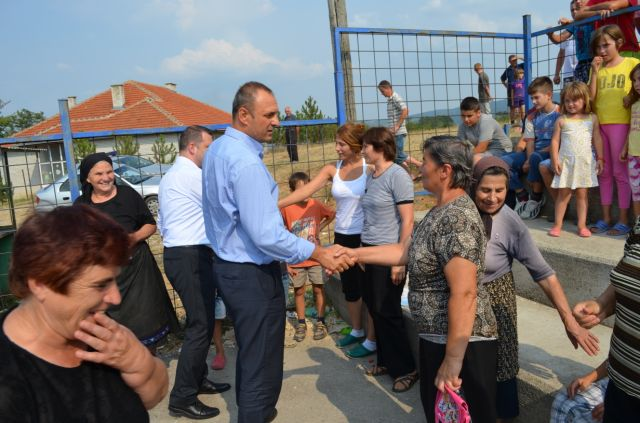
Slobodan Petrović in the visit to the Serb village of Ranilug in 2013

Petrović is an ethnic Serb and was born on 21 December 1969 in Pristina, then SFR Yugoslavia. Petrović is married and is a lawyer by profession.
