= Progressive Democratic Party (Kosovo) =

Progressive Democratic Party Прогресивна демократска странка Progresivna demokratska stranka Partia Demokratike Progresive
- Founder: Nenad Rašić
- Founded: 2014
- Dissolved: 2021 (endorsing); 2024 (merging)
- Merged into: CI SPO
- Ideology: Serb minority interests
- Assembly: 0 / 120

The Progressive Democratic Party (Serbian Cyrillic: Прогресивна демократска странка, romanized: Progresivna demokratska stranka, PDS; Albanian: Partia Demokratike Progresive) is an ethnic Serb political party in Kosovo founded by Nenad Rašić.

== History ==
The party was established by Rašić in April 2014 after he left the Independent Liberal Party. In the June 2014 elections the party won one of the ten seats reserved for Serbs in the Assembly, taken by Rašić. In 2015 he joined the Serb List parliamentary group.
