= For Freedom, Justice and Survival =

Kosovar political party

For Freedom, Justice and Survival За слободу, правду и опстанак Za slobodu, pravdu i opstanak Për liri, drejtësi dhe mbijetesë
- Abbreviation: ZSPO
- President: Nenad Rašić
- General Secretary: Milan Dabić
- Founded: 2021
- Registered: 16 May 2024
- Ideology: Serb minority interests Liberalism; Pro-Europeanism
- Political position: Centre
- Slogan: Svoj život u svoje ruke Take your life in your hands
- Assembly: 1 / 120
- Mayors: 0 / 38

Website
- https://www.facebook.com/people/Za-Slobodu-Pravdu-i-Opstanak/61555680641298/

For Freedom, Justice and Survival (Serbian: За слободу, правду и опстанак, Za slobodu, pravdu i opstanak, ZSPO, Albanian: Për liri, drejtësi dhe mbijetesë) is a Serb minority political party in Kosovo. It is led by government minister Nenad Rašić.

== History ==
=== Foundation as Civic Initiative "For Freedom, Justice and Survival" (2021–2023) ===
The ZSPO was founded as a civic initiative named Civic Initiative for Freedom, Justice and Survival (GI SPO) and participated in the 2021 Kosovan parliamentary election. Among its candidates were Rada Trajković, a former minister of family and services in the Government of Serbia from 1998 to 2000, and Cvetko Veljković, former head of the Office for Communities in the government of Albin Kurti. The organization was endorsed by Nenad Rašić and his Progressive Democratic Party. During the election campaign, Veljković and Rašić, together with Albin Kurti, visited Štrpce. The organization won 1,508 votes or 0.17% of the popular vote, failing to gain any of the 10 seats reserved for the Kosovo Serb community; instead, they all went to the Serbian-backed Serb List (SL), which received 5.09% of the popular vote.

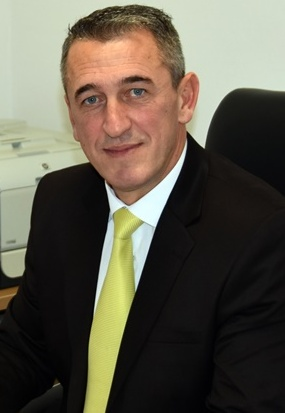
Nenad Rašić, the leader of ZSPO

Following the resignation of all 10 Serb List MPs in on 7 November 2022, the Kosovo Serb community lost its representatives in the Assembly of Kosovo. On 17 November, the Serb List MPs were replaced by new MPs, most of whom were from the same party, and by Cvetko Veljković, making the GI SPO a parliamentary organization. In 2022, Veljković left GI SPO. Rasić was subsequently appointed as Minister for Communities and Returns on 1 December 2022.

=== Transformation into a political party and electoral success (2024–present) ===
In May 2024, the GI SPO was officially registered as a political party with Nenad Rašić as the president. It was subsequently renamed into For Freedom, Justice and Survival (ZSPO). In the February 2025 parliamentary election campaign, the Serb Democracy (SD) and its leader Aleksandar Arsenijević accused ZSPO of vote buying. The ZSPO subsequently gathered 3,997 (0.48 %) of the vote, gaining one seat in the Assembly of Kosovo, with Nenad Rasić being elected as an MP. The party retained their seat in parliament in the subsequent snap election in December 2025, seeing a slight increase to 4,862 votes (0.52 %) compared to their previous results. Party president Rasić also retained his post in Albin Kurti's cabinet.

== Election results ==
=== Parliamentary elections ===
Assembly of Kosovo
Year	Leader	Popular vote	% of vote	Overall seats won	Serb seats	+/–	Government
2021	Nenad Rašić	1,508	0.17%	0 / 120	0 / 10	New	Extra-parliamentary
Feb 2025	Nenad Rašić	3,997	0.48%	1 / 120	1 / 10	▲1	Snap election
Dec 2025	Nenad Rašić	4,862	0.51%	1 / 120	1 / 10	0	Government
2026	Nenad Rašić	5,447	0.67%	1 / 120	1 / 10	0	Government
