= Kosovo Serbs =

Ethnic group

Serbët në Kosovë Срби на Косову Srbi na Kosovu
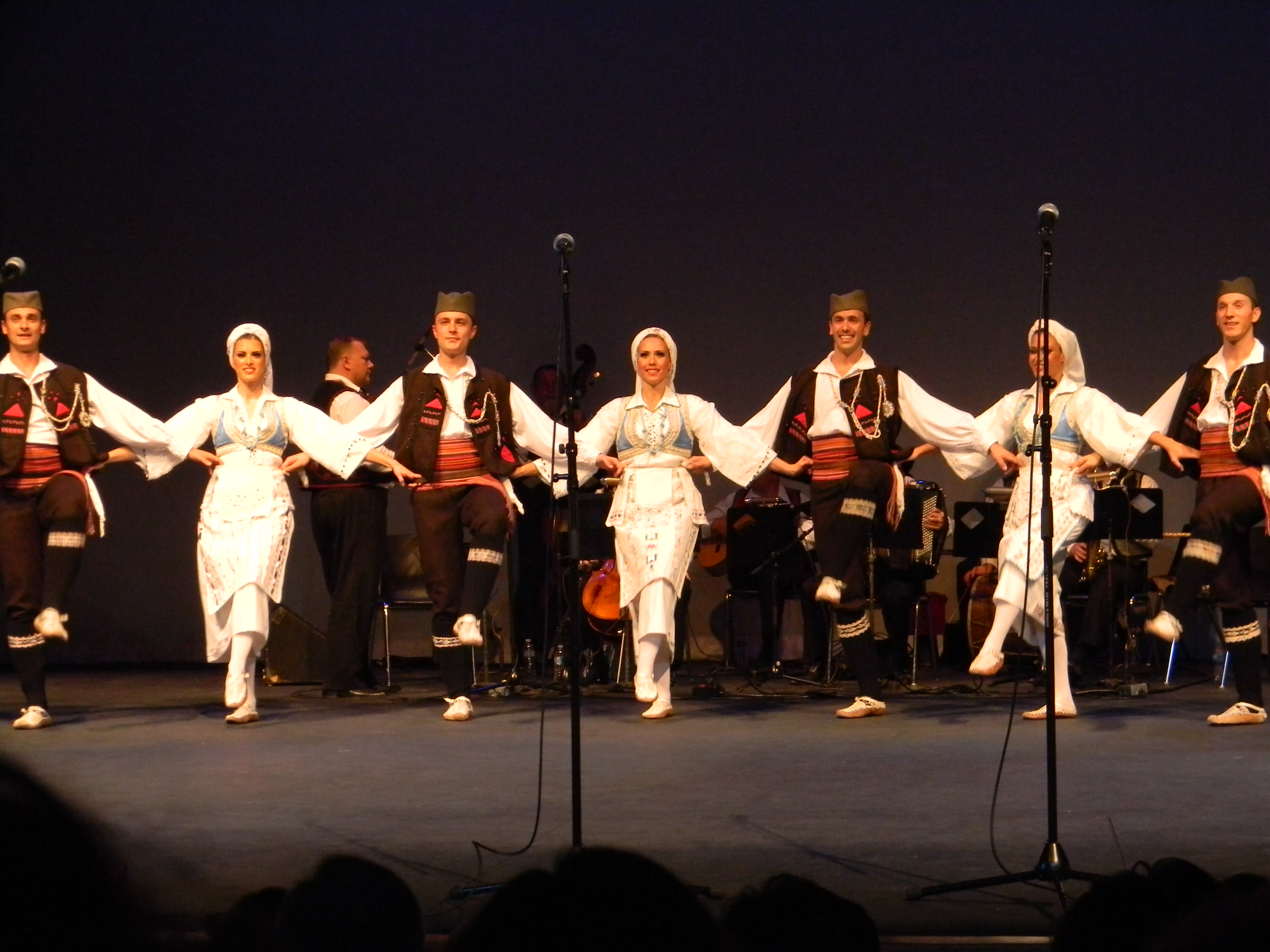
- Traditional folk costume of Serbs of Kosovo

Total population
- 95,000–100,000 (est.)

Regions with significant populations
- North Kosovo, Central Kosovo plain, Kosovo Pomoravlje, Sirinićka župa

Languages
- Serbian

Religion
- Eastern Orthodoxy (Serbian Orthodox Church)

Kosovo Serbs (Serbian: Косовски Срби, romanized: Kosovski Srbi) (Note: The correct political term is Serbs of Kosovo and Metohija (Serbian: Срби на Косову и Метохији, romanized: Srbi na Kosovu i Metohiji), in use by the Serbian government. They are also referred to as Serbs of Kosovo and Serbs from Kosovo (Serbian: Срби с Косова, romanized: Srbi s Kosova). The community is also known by the demonym Kosovans (Serbian: Косовци, romanized: Kosovci).) are a recognized ethnic minority community in Kosovo. According to the estimates, the population of ethnic Serbs is 95,000 to 100,000, constituting 5% to 6% of the total population; they are the second-largest ethnic group in Kosovo after Albanians.

The medieval Kingdom of Serbia and the Serbian Empire included parts of the territory of Kosovo until its annexation by the Ottomans following the Battle of Kosovo in 1389, considered one of the most pivotal events in Serbian history. Modern Serbian historiography considers Kosovo in this period to be the political, religious, and cultural core of the medieval Serbian state. In the 16th century, the Serbian Patriarchate of Peć was re-established and its status strengthened. At the end of 18th century, the support of the Patriarchate to the Habsburgs during the Great Turkish War triggered a wave of Serb migrations to areas under the control of the Habsburg monarchy. After the independence of the Principality of Serbia to its north, Kosovo came increasingly to be seen by the mid-19th century as the "cradle of Serb civilization" and called the "Serbian Jerusalem".

Kosovo was annexed by the Kingdom of Serbia in 1912, following the First Balkan War. During the period of the Kingdom of Yugoslavia, Kosovo experienced the Serb colonisation which aimed to increase the number of Serbs in Kosovo with colonists from Serbia and Montenegro. After World War II, Kosovo became an autonomous province within Serbia under Yugoslavia's socialist federation, with significant cultural and political rights granted to balance Albanian and Serb interests. As a result of the Kosovo War and following by its declaration of independence in 2008 it is partially recognized by the international community. Following the Kosovo War, over half of Kosovo Serb population were expelled, primarily to Serbia.

== History ==
=== Middle Ages ===
Sclaveni raided and settled the western Balkans in the 6th and 7th century. The White Serbs are mentioned in De Administrando Imperio as having settled the Balkans during the reign of Byzantine Emperor Heraclius (r. 610–641), however, research does not support that the White Serbian tribe was part of this later migration (as held by historiography) rather than migrating with the rest of Early Slavs.

Starting from the first half of the 9th century, and up to the second half of the 10th century, several Byzantine–Bulgarian and Bulgarian–Serbian wars were fought in various regions, including Kosovo, that came under Bulgarian control. During the reign of Byzantine emperor John I Tzimiskes (969–976), Byzantine control was established throughout the region, including Kosovo and up to the Catepanate of Ras.

Byzantine rule in the region was suppressed by Samuel of Bulgaria (976–1014), but later restored by emperor Basil II in 1018. Under Byantine rule, local Eastern Orthodox eparchies of Lipljan and Prizren were placed under the jurisdiction of the Archbishopric of Ohrid.

In 1040–1041 a massive Bulgarian rebellion against Byzantine rule broke out, which included Kosovo. Another rebellion broke out in 1072, in which Serbian prince Constantine Bodin was crowned Emperor of Bulgaria at Prizren, however, despite some initial success, he was eventually captured and the rebellion was suppressed. Vukan I, the new independent Serbian Grand Prince, began raiding Byzantine territories during the early 1090s, first in Kosovo, capturing Lipjan, and advancing further towards Skoplje and Vranje. He broke several peace treaties that he personally negotiated with the Byzantine Emperor at Zvečan and Lipjan, until finally submitting in 1106.

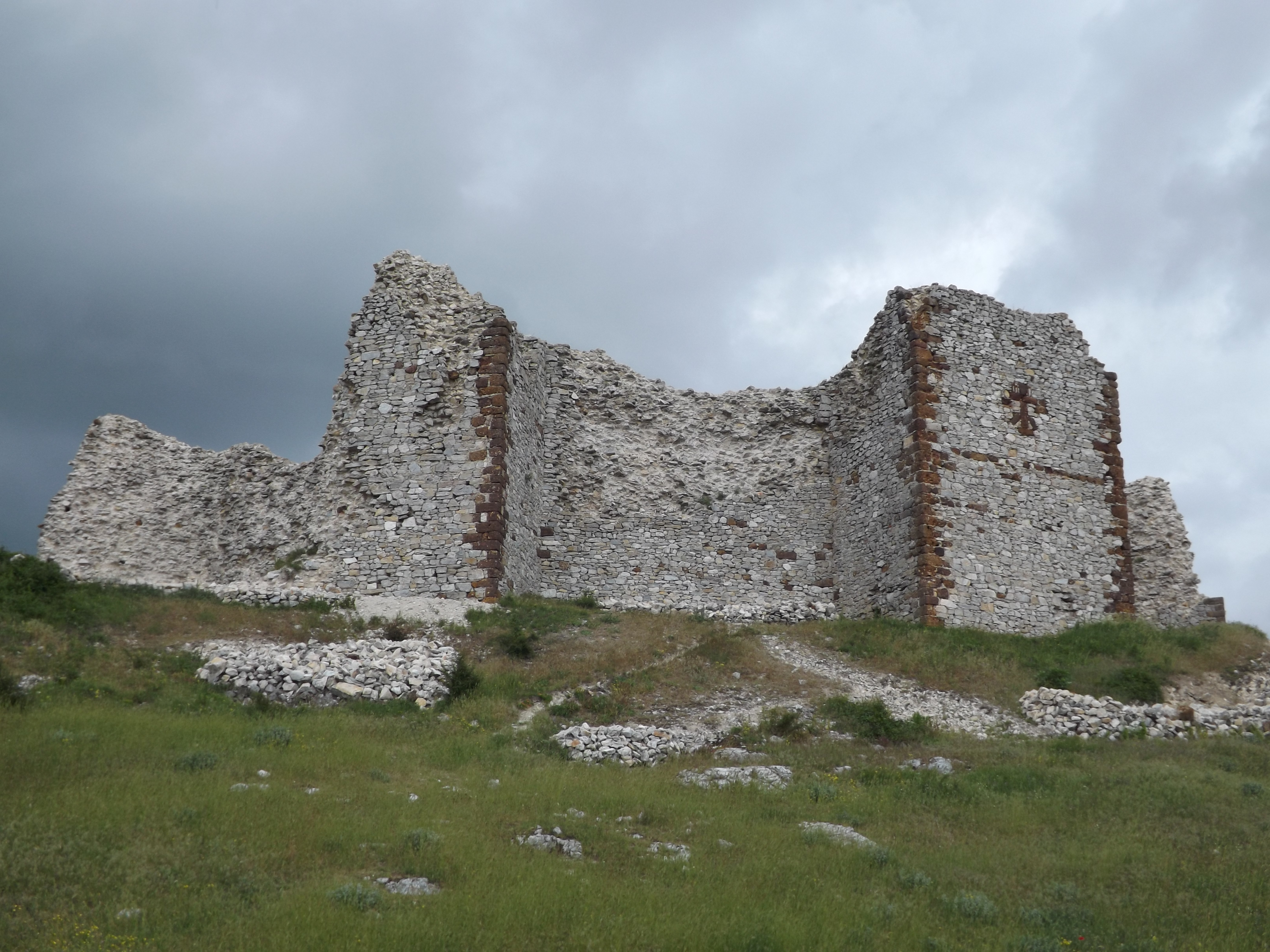
Novo Brdo Fortress, built by Stefan Milutin, King of Serbia; it has been referred as the "Mother of all Serbian cities"

In 1166, a Serbian prince, Stefan Nemanja, the founder of the Nemanjić dynasty, asserted independence after an uprising against the Byzantine Emperor Manuel I Comnenus. Nemanja defeated his brother, Tihomir, at Pantino near Pauni, and drowned him in the Sitnica river. Nemanja was eventually defeated and had to return some of his conquests, and vouched to the Emperor that he would not rebel against him again. In 1183, Stefan Nemanja embarked on a new offensive allied with the Kingdom of Hungary after the death of Manuel I Komnenos in 1180, which marked the end of Byzantine domination over the region of Kosovo. Nemanja's son, Stefan, ruled a realm reaching the river of Lab in the south. Stefan conquered all of Kosovo by 1208, by which time he had conquered Prizren and Lipljan, and moved the border of his realm to the Šar mountain. In 1217, Stefan was crowned King of Serbs, due to which he is known in historiography as Stefan "the First-Crowned".

In 1219, the Serbian Archbishopric was given autocephaly, with Hvosno, Prizren and Lipljan eparchies in the territory of present-day Kosovo. By the end of the 13th century, the centre of the Serbian Church was moved to Peć from Žiča.

Prizren served as the capital of Serbia during the 14th century and was an important trade centre. King Stefan Dušan founded the Monastery of the Holy Archangels near Prizren in 1342–1352. During this period, several grand monasteries were endowed with vast possessions in the regions of Kosovo and Metohija. The Serbian Kingdom was elevated into an Empire in 1345–46. In 1346, the Serbian Archbishopric at Peć was upgraded into a Patriarchate, but it was not recognized until 1375. After the death of Stefan Dušan in 1355, the fall of the Serbian Empire began, with feudal disintegration during the reign of his successor, Stefan Uroš V (r. 1355–1371).

Parts of Kosovo became domains of Vukašin Mrnjavčević, but Vojislav Vojinović expanded his demesne further onto Kosovo. The armies of Vukašin from Pristina and his allies defeated Vojislav's forces in 1369, putting a halt to his advances. After the Battle of Maritsa in 1371 in which the Mrnjavčević brothers lost their lives, Đurađ I Balšić of Zeta took Prizren and Peć in 1372. A part of Kosovo became the demesne of the Prince Lazar.

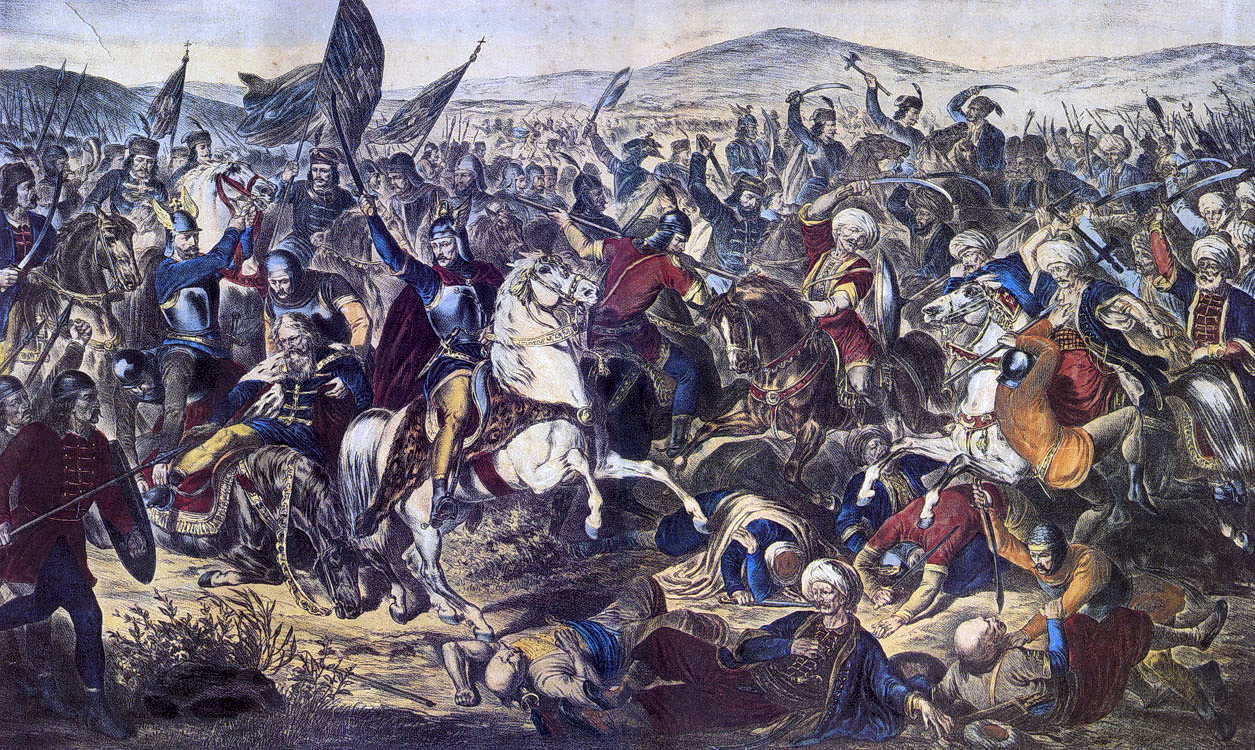
Battle of Kosovo (1870), a painting by Adam Stefanović, depicting the Battle of Kosovo

The Ottoman Empire invaded the realm of Lazar of Serbia on 28 June 1389, at the Battle of Kosovo near Pristina, at Gazimestan. The Serbian army, led by Prince Lazar with 12,000–30,000 men, faced the Ottoman army of 27,000–40,000. Lazar was killed in battle, while Sultan Murad I also lost his life, believed to have been assassinated by Serbian knight Miloš Obilić. The outcome of the battle is deemed inconclusive, with the new Sultan Bayezid I having to retreat to consolidate his power. Vuk Branković came to prominence as the local lord of Kosovo, though he was an Ottoman vassal at times, between 1392 and 1395.

Another battle occurred in 1448 between the Hungarian troops led by regent John Hunyadi and supported by the Albanian ruler Skanderbeg on one side, and Ottoman troops supported by the Branković dynasty in 1448. Skanderbeg's troops, were stopped by Branković's troops, as he was more or less an Ottoman vassal. Hungarians lost the battle after a 2-day fight, but essentially stopped the Ottoman advance northwards. In 1455, southern regions of the Serbian Despotate were invaded again, and the region of Kosovo was finally conquered by the Ottoman Empire and incorporated into the Ottoman administrative system.

=== Ottoman rule ===
The Ottomans brought islamization with them, particularly in towns, and later also created the Kosovo vilayet as one of the administrative divisions of the Ottoman Empire. During the process of Islamisation, many Orthodox churches and holy sites were razed to the ground or converted into mosques. The grand Monastery of the Holy Archangels near Prizren was torn down at the end of the 16th century and the material used to build the Sinan Pasha Mosque, in Prizren, named after an islamized Albanian. Although the Serbian Patriarchate of Peć was officially abolished in 1532, an islamized Serb from Bosnia, Grand Vizier Sokollu Mehmed Pasha influenced the restoration of the Patriarchate in 1557. Special privileges were granted which helped the survival of Serbs and other Christians in Kosovo.

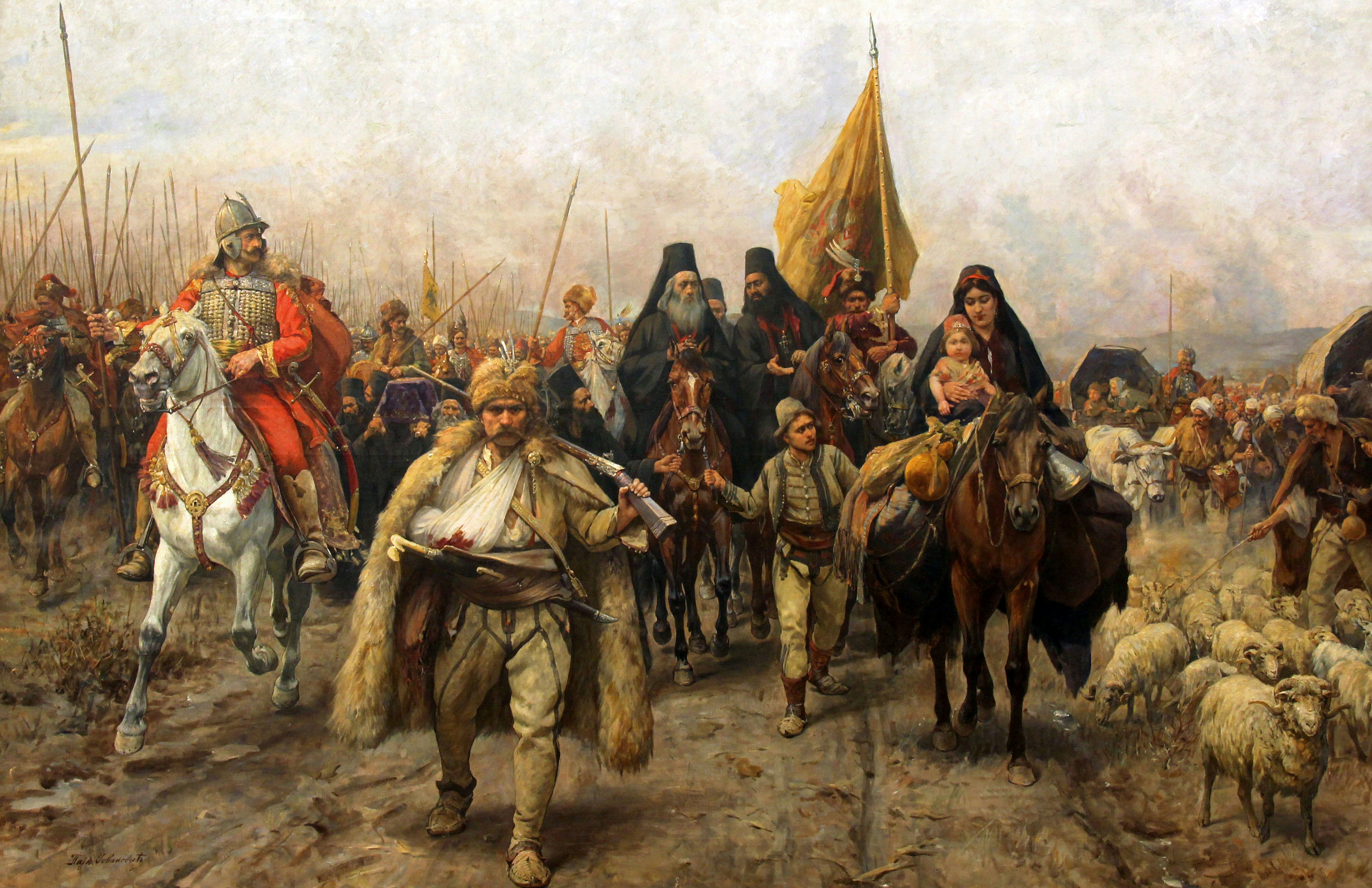
Migration of the Serbs (1896), a painting by Paja Jovanović, depicting the Great Serb Migrations in late 17th century

Kosovo was taken by the Austrian forces during the Great Turkish War (1683–1698). In 1690, the Serbian Patriarch Arsenije III, led 37,000 families from Kosovo to escape Ottoman reprisals after the province was retaken by the Ottomans. In 1766, the Ottomans abolished the Serbian Patriarchate of Peć.

During the First Serbian Uprising, Serbs from the northern parts of Kosovo prepared to join the uprising, but an Ottoman army arrived to suppress their efforts before they could partake in the uprising. Ottoman violence resulted in a number of Serbs migrating to central Serbia in order to join rebels led by Karađorđe. The Kelmendi were the only Albanian tribe to fully support Serb rebels. After the independence of the Principality of Serbia to its north, Kosovo came increasingly to be seen by the mid-19th century as the "cradle of Serb civilization" and called the "Serbian Jerusalem".

The term Arnauti or Arnautaši was coined by 19th and early 20th century Serbian ethnographers to refer to the Kosovo Albanians, which they perceived as Albanised Serbs; Serbs who had converted to Islam and went through a process of Albanisation. In modern anthropology, the historical validity of the term has been criticized as well as use as a tool of nation-building and homogenization efforts of the Serbian state.

By the end of the 19th century, Albanians became the dominating nation of Kosovo. In the aftermath of the expulsion of the Albanians in the newly annexed territories of southern Serbia and the resettlements of tens of thousands of Albanians mostly in eastern Kosovo, attacks against Serbs took place, during and after the Serbian–Ottoman War. In 1901, massacres against Serbs were carried out by Albanians in North Kosovo and Pristina. Jovan Cvijić claimed that the Albanians were responsible for forcing an estimated 150,000 Serbs out of Kosovo from 1876 until 1912. Albanians were also accused of conducting a campaign of terror against the Serbian population who remained.

=== Balkan Wars and World War I ===
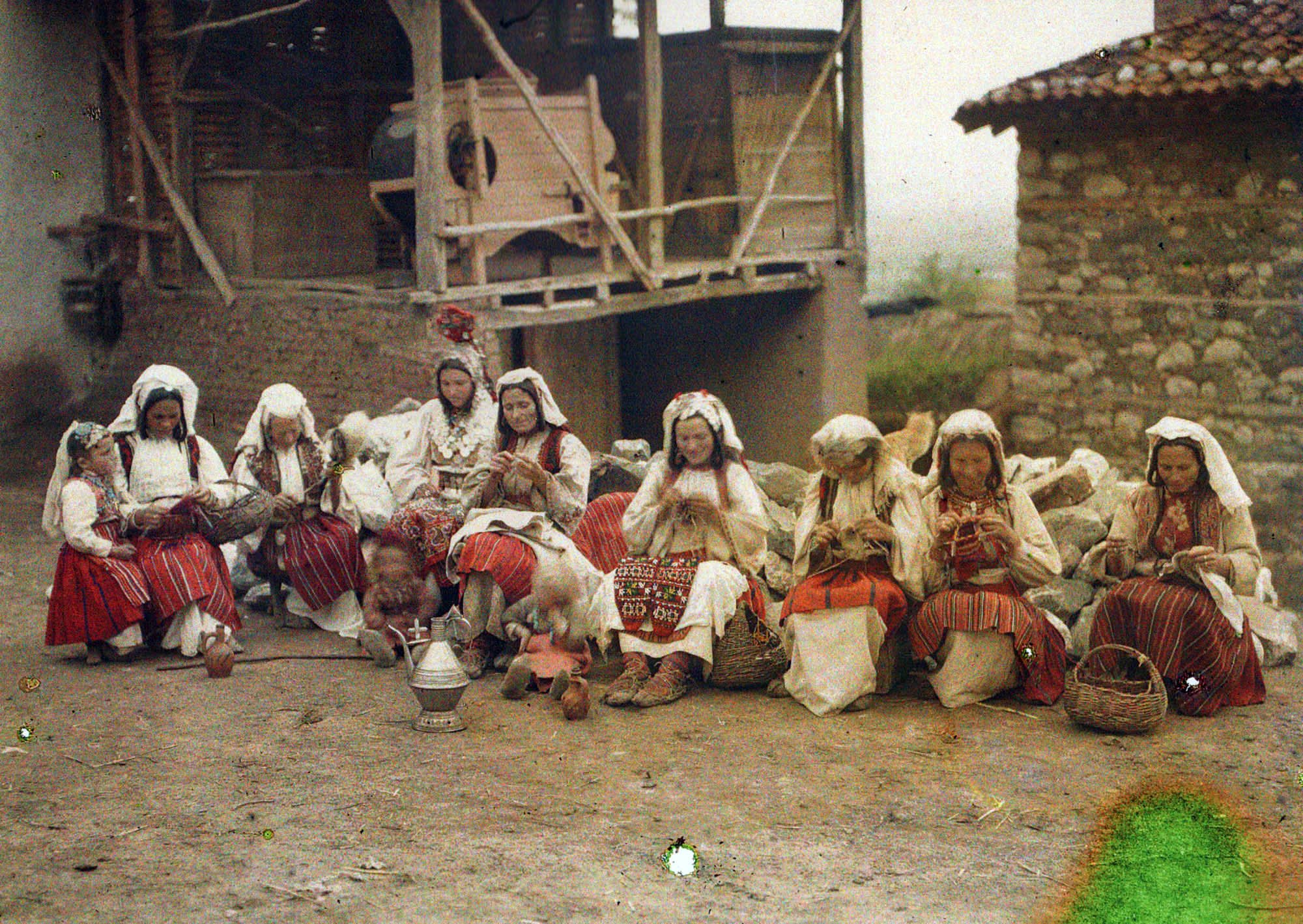
Serb women in traditional clothing near Prizren, 1913

The rising Kingdom of Serbia planned a restoration of its rule in Kosovo as Ottoman might crumbled in the Balkan peninsula by the end of the 19th century. Some historians suggest that Austro-Hungarian emissaries were active in areas where Serbs and Albanians coexisted, deliberately stirring conflicts and divisions between the two ethnicities to advance their state's political interests and influence. During the First Balkan War, the Kingdom of Serbia and the Kingdom of Montenegro fought alongside Greece and Bulgaria as part of the Balkan League to drive the Ottoman forces out of Europe and to incorporate the spoils into their respective states. Serbia, Montenegro, and Greece had acquired the entire Albanian-inhabited territories (with the exception of Vlora) in the hope of achieving recognition with their new borders. Resistance from the Albanians across their entire region in favour of their own proposed independent nation state led to fighting between the Balkan League armies and Albanian forces. To end the conflict, the Treaty of London decreed an independent Principality of Albania (close to its present borders), with bulk of the Kosovo vilayet going to Serbia and the region around Peć awarded to Montenegro.

During the World War I, in the winter of 1915–1916, the Serbian army withdrew through Kosovo in a bid to evade the forces of the Central Powers. Thousands died of starvation and exposure. In 1918, the Serbian army pushed the Central Powers out of Kosovo, and the region was unified as Montenegro subsequently joined the Kingdom of Serbia.

=== Kingdom of Yugoslavia ===
The monarchy was then transformed into the Kingdom of Serbs, Croats, and Slovenes (renamed the Kingdom of Yugoslavia in 1929). The territories of Kosovo were split among the Zeta Banovina, the Banate of Morava and the Banate of Vardar. During the 1920s and 1930s, the Kingdom of Yugoslavia encouraged Serb colonization in Kosovo to strengthen Slavic presence in the region, resettling around 10,000–15,000 Serb families (roughly 60,000 people). Many Albanian families were forcibly displaced or pressured to emigrate to Turkey under a 1938 convention. The policy aimed at demographic shift but largely failed due to resistance, poor conditions, and the onset of World War II.

=== World War II ===
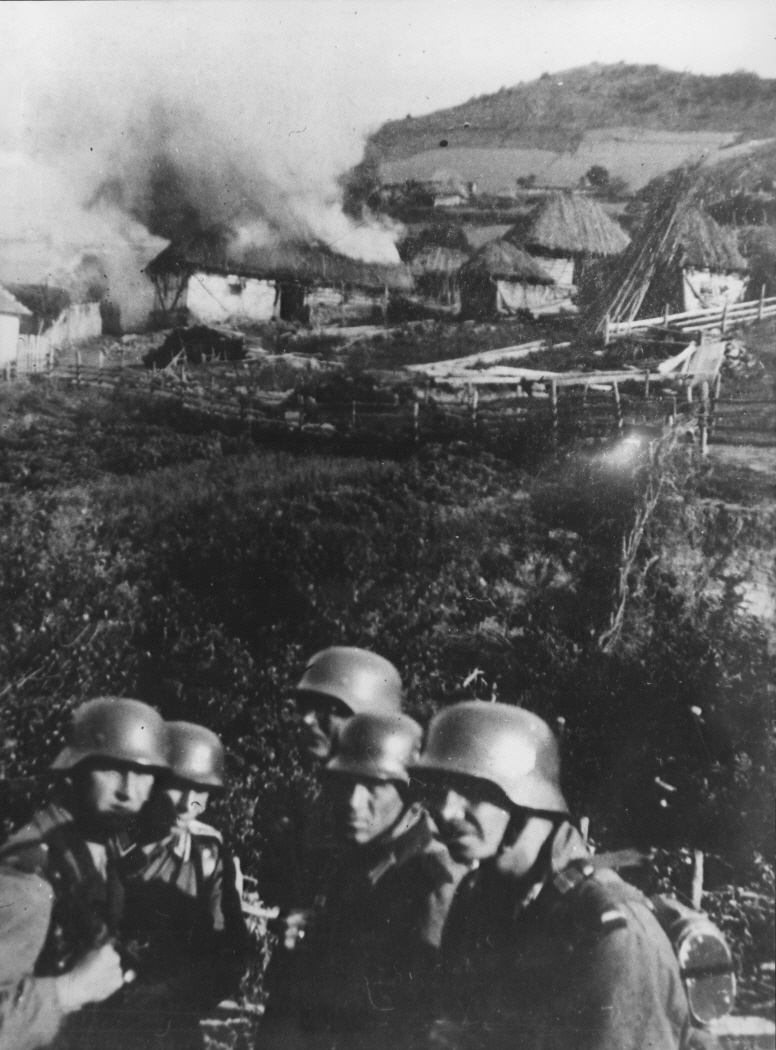
German soldiers set fire to a Serb village near Mitrovica, 1941

After the invasion of Yugoslavia in 1941, the Axis powers divided its territory among themselves. Kosovo was divided between Fascist Italy, Nazi Germany, and Kingdom of Bulgaria occupation. The largest part of Kosovo came under Italian occupation and was annexed into an axis Greater Albania, the Albanian Kingdom, while northern parts were included in German-occupied Serbia, and southeastern parts into the Bulgarian occupational zone. Parts of eastern Montenegro and western Macedonia were also annexed to Albania.

During the occupation, the Serb population was subject to expulsion, internment, forced labour, torture, destruction of private property, confiscation of land and livestock, destruction and damaging of monasteries, churches, cultural-historical monuments and graveyards. There were waves of violence against Serbs in some periods (such as April 1941, June 1942, and September 1943) and continuous pressure in various ways. Civilians were sent to camps and prisons established by the Italian, German and Bulgarian occupation as well as the Albanian community. The expulsion of Serbs proved problematic, as they had performed important functions in the region, and been running most of the businesses, mills, tanneries, and public utilities, and been responsible for most of the useful agricultural production. Most of the war crimes were perpetrated by the Vullnetari ("volunteers"), Balli Kombëtar, and the SS Skanderbeg Division. The SS Skanderbeg Division was better known for murdering, raping, and looting in predominantly Serbian areas than for participating in combat operations on behalf of the German war effort. The most precarious position for Serbs was in the Italian (Albanian) zone. A large part of the Serb population was expelled or forced to flee in order to survive. Serbian estimations put the number of expelled at around 100,000; an estimated 40,000 from the Italian-occupation zone, 30,000 from the German zone, and 25,000 from the Bulgarian zone. It is estimated that 10,000 Serbs and Montenegrins were killed in Kosovo during the whole war period.

=== Socialist Yugoslavia ===
The Province of Kosovo was formed in 1946 as a Socialist Autonomous Province of Kosovo with limited self-government and in order to give an institutionalized framework protection for Albanian ethnic majority, which was part of the People's Republic of Serbia which in turn was the constituent republic of the Federal People's Republic of Yugoslavia under the leadership of the former Partisan leader, Josip Broz Tito, with limited self-government. After constitutional changes in 1963 (country's name changed to the Socialist Federal Republic of Yugoslavia and Serbia's to the Socialist Republic of Serbia), the now-termed Autonomous Region of Kosovo and Metohija's status was equalized with that of Vojvodina; further constitutional amendments in 1968 elevated the autonomous provinces to constitutional elements of the federation while the term socialist was added and the term Metohija was removed from Kosovo. The 1974 Yugoslav constitution, the Socialist Autonomous Province of Kosovo received higher powers, allowing it to have its own administration, assembly, and judiciary. It also received membership in the collective presidency and the federal parliament, in which it held veto power, though remaining part of the Socialist Republic of Serbia.

In the 1970s, an Albanian nationalist movement pursued for elevation of the Kosovo status as the constituent republic within the federation, while the most extreme elements aimed for independence and subsequent unification with People's Socialist Republic of Albania. Tito's government dealt with the situation swiftly, but only gave it a temporary solution. In 1981, Albanian students organized protests demanding more autonomy for Kosovo. During this period, the ethnic balance of Kosovo witnessed disproportional increase as the number of Albanians rose dramatically due to higher birth rates. Serbs share in total population of Kosovo went down to 10% at the same time.

During this period, Slobodan Milošević began his rise to power in Serbia. One of the events that contributed to Milošević's rise of power was the Gazimestan speech, delivered in front of 1,000,000 Serbs at the central celebration marking the 600th anniversary of the Battle of Kosovo, held at Gazimestan on 28 June 1989. Soon afterwards, as approved by the national Assembly of Serbia, the autonomy of Kosovo was revoked back to the pre-1974 Yugoslav constitution status.

=== Kosovo War ===
By mid-1990s, the Kosovo Liberation Army, ethnic-Albanian paramilitary organisation that sought the independence for Kosovo and the subsequent creation of a Greater Albania, began attacking Serbian civilians as well as Serbian police, even ethnic Albanians who were seen as cooperative to Serbian government.

In March 1999, NATO launched a 78-day air campaign against Serbia and Montenegro without UN Security Council approval, aiming to halt human rights abuses and force Serbian withdrawal from Kosovo. The conflict displaced over 800,000 Albanians and caused thousands of deaths on all sides before Serbian forces withdrew in June. Kosovo was placed under U.N. administration and Kosovo Force (KFOR), a NATO-led peacekeeping force was deployed to the province. There have been many reports of abuses and war crimes committed by the Kosovo Liberation Army during and after the conflict, including the massacres of Serb civilians (Lake Radonjić, Klečka, Staro Gracko, and Gnjilane, along with prison camps such as Lapušnik), organ theft, and destruction of medieval churches and monuments.

In the aftermath of the war, more than half of pre-war Kosovo Serb population, as well as 37,000 Roma, 15,000 Ashkali and Gorani, and 7,000 other non-Albanian civilians were expelled primarily to Serbia.

=== Contemporary period ===
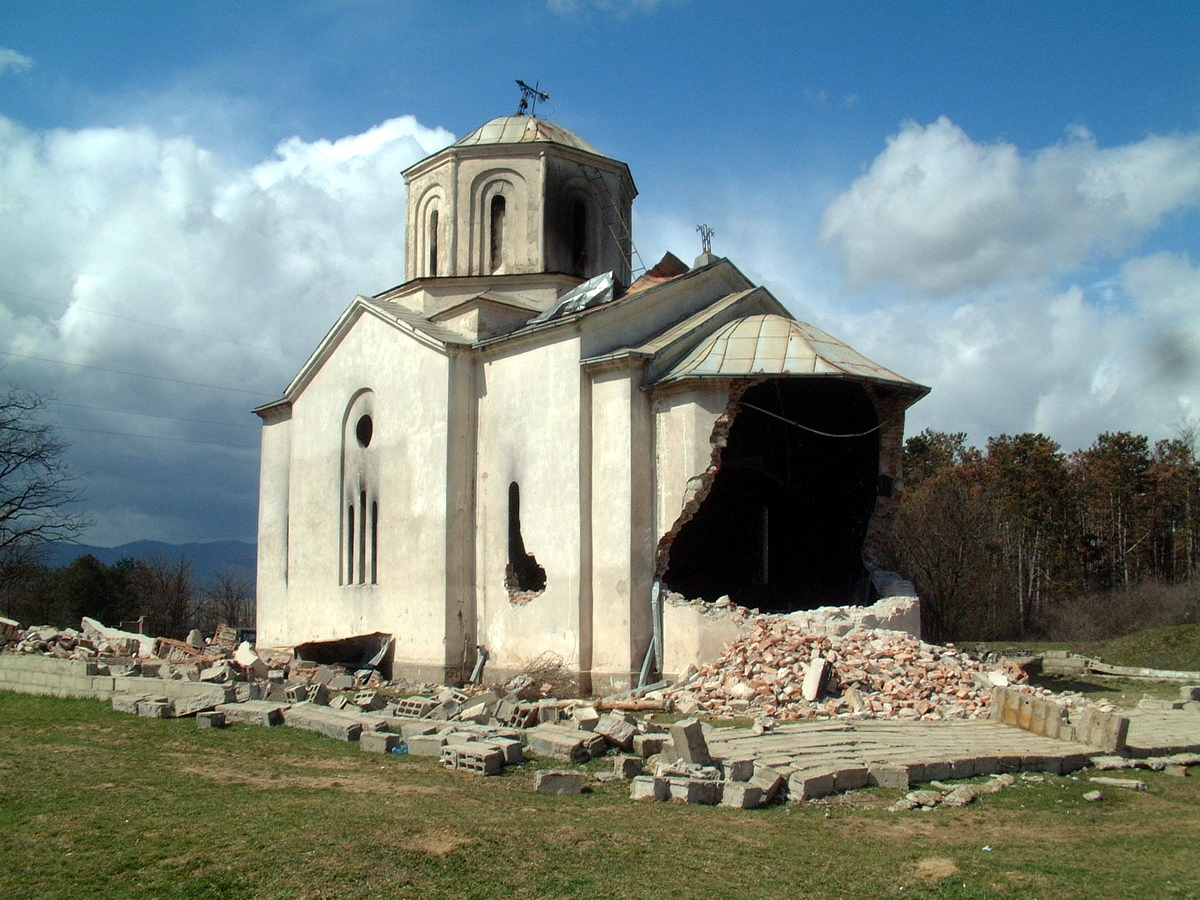
Serbian Orthodox Church of St. Elijah in Podujevo destroyed during 2004 unrest in Kosovo. Tens of religious objects were destroyed and damaged, while thousands of Serbs were forced to leave their homes.

In 2004, violent unrest erupted across Kosovo after false reports of Serbian men drowning three Albanian children, leading ethnic Albanians to attack Serb communities, churches, and monasteries. The two-day riots killed 19 people, displaced over 4,000 Serbs, while 35 churches and monasteries were destroyed or seriously damaged.

In 2008, Kosovo's parliament unilaterally declared independence from Serbia, invoking the right to self-determination for its Albanian majority. The move was immediately recognized by the United States and most EU countries but rejected by Serbia, Russia, and others, leading to ongoing international disputes over its statehood.

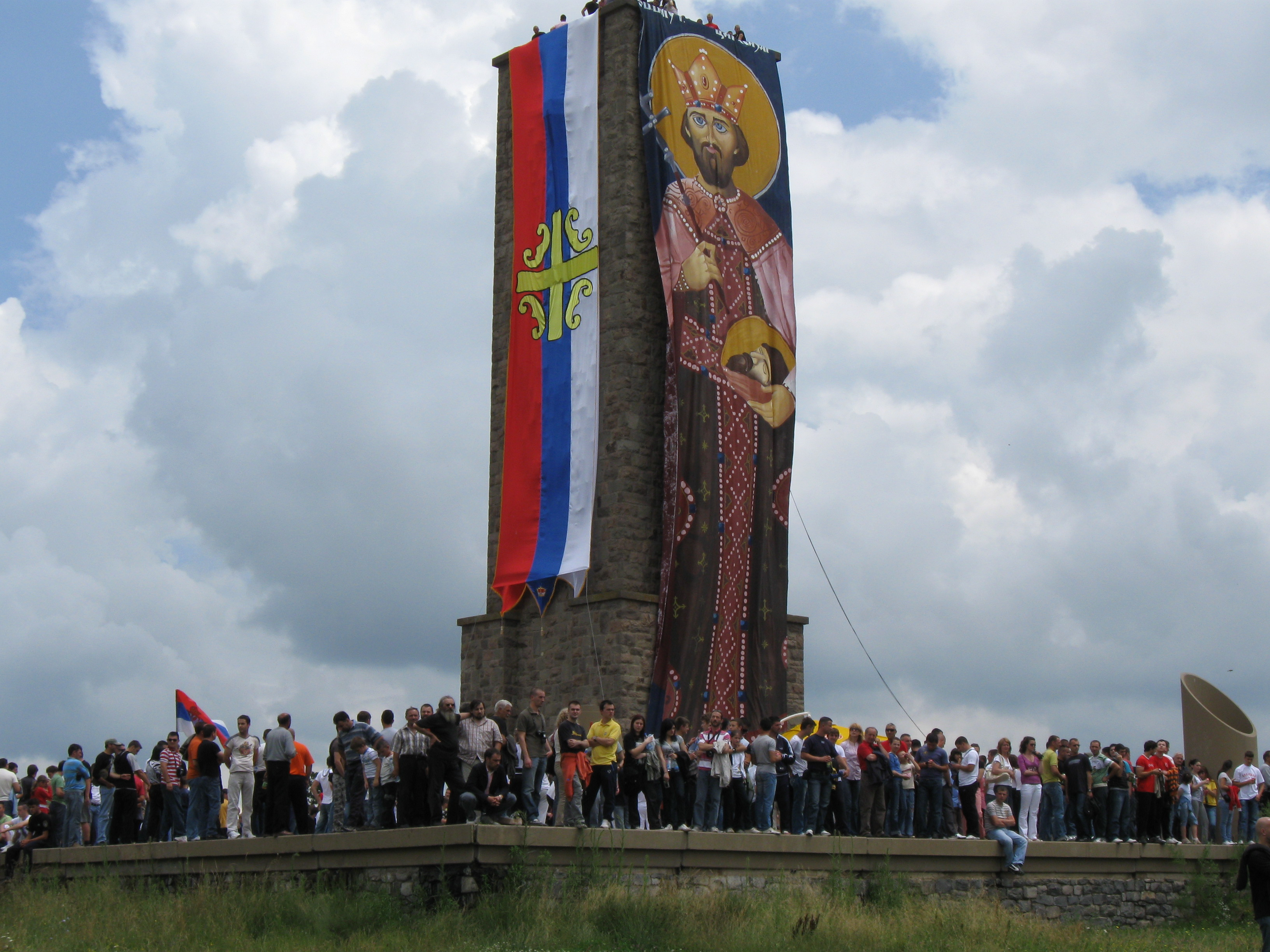
Vidovdan celebration in Gazimestan, 2009

In 2013, Kosovo and Serbia signed the Brussels Agreement. The agreement established the Community of Serb Municipalities, encompassing Serb-majority areas It envisaged the withdrawal of Serbian state administration presence in North Kosovo, in exchange for the expansion of self-governance for Serbs of Kosovo. The agreement also defined the structure of the police and local elections, called for integration of Serbian institutions into the Kosovo police and judicial authorities within Kosovo's legal framework. Belgrade did not recognize Kosovo's independence but both sides agreed to not prevent the other in its EU integration.

During the COVID-19 pandemic, Kosovo Serbs found themselves in a limbo, stuck between different orders issued by Serbia and Kosovo. In November 2020, during the COVID pandemics, Kosovo policemen and inspectors stormed and temporarily closed several Serb-owned pharmacies in North Kosovo, attempting to confiscate medicine supplies, because the items were allegedly not registered within the central system in Pristina. The act was met with citizen protest which were on the verge of escalation. In 2021, Serbs in North Kosovo protested following the Kosovo government's reciprocal decision to ban Serbian license plates entering Kosovo. The ensuing crisis was temporarily eased when Kosovo and Serbia reached an agreement to end the standoff, with stickers being placed over each country's insignia on number plates at border crossings. In 2022 tensions flared up again when the Kosovo government declared that Serbia-issued identity documents and vehicle licence plates would be invalid, prompting Serbs in North Kosovo to protest again by blocking roads. Soon afterwards, Serbia agreed to abolish entry and exit documents for Kosovo citizens while Kosovo committed to refrain from implementing such measures for Serbian citizens. Later that year, ethnic Serbs resigned en masse from local-government institutions in protest. In 2023, local elections were held, boycotted by ethnic Serbs. As a result, ethnic Albanian mayors were elected in the Serb-majority municipalities of Zvečan, Leposavić, Zubin Potok and North Mitrovica. When Kosovo police took control of the municipal buildings in Zvečan, Zubin Potok and Leposavić to allow the newly elected mayors to assume office, protesters gathered in front of the municipal buildings and tried stop the police from escorting the mayor inside, resulting in multiple injuries. Later that year, a group of Serb militants ambushed police units in the village of Banjska in North Kosovo, resulting in one policeman being killed and two others wounded, and three of the gunmen being killed. In 2024, the Kosovo government banned the use of the Serbian dinar as a legal tender in North Kosovo. The move was criticized by the Western countries since the Serbs in Kosovo heavily rely on financial assistance and social benefit payments from the Serbian state.

To this day, Serbs in Kosovo frequently encounter manifestations of hostility and physical attacks.

== Demographics ==
Year	Population	Share
1921	92,203	21.2%
1931	150,745	27.3%
1948	171,911	23.6%
1953	189,969	23.5%
1961	227,016	23.5%
1971	228,264	18.4%
1981	209,498	13.2%
1991	194,190	9.9%
2017	94,998	5-6%

Since the beginning of the 20th century, the Serb population in Kosovo has steadily declined to the present day. According to estimates (since no official data is reliable, as most Serbs have boycotted national censuses), there were around 95,000 Serbs in Kosovo, roughly one half in the compact area of North Kosovo and the other half in Serb enclaves across the central and southeastern parts of Kosovo. They form an ethnic majority in ten municipalities, four of them in North Kosovo (North Mitrovica, Leposavić, Zvečan, and Zubin Potok), and six are southern (enclave) municipalities (Gračanica, Štrpce, Novo Brdo, Ranilug, Parteš, and Klokot).

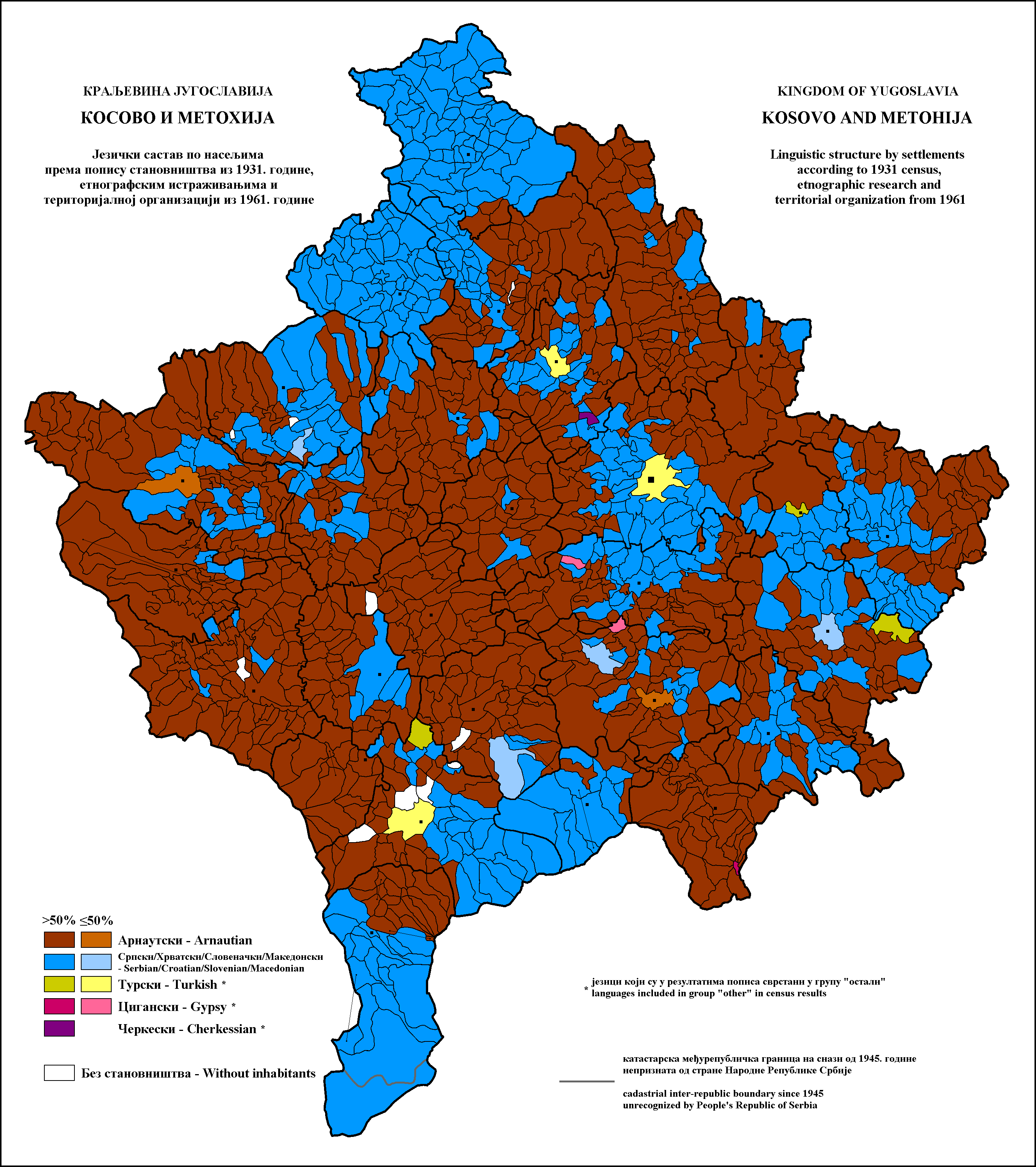
Serbian language areas
(in blue) in Kosovo, 1931

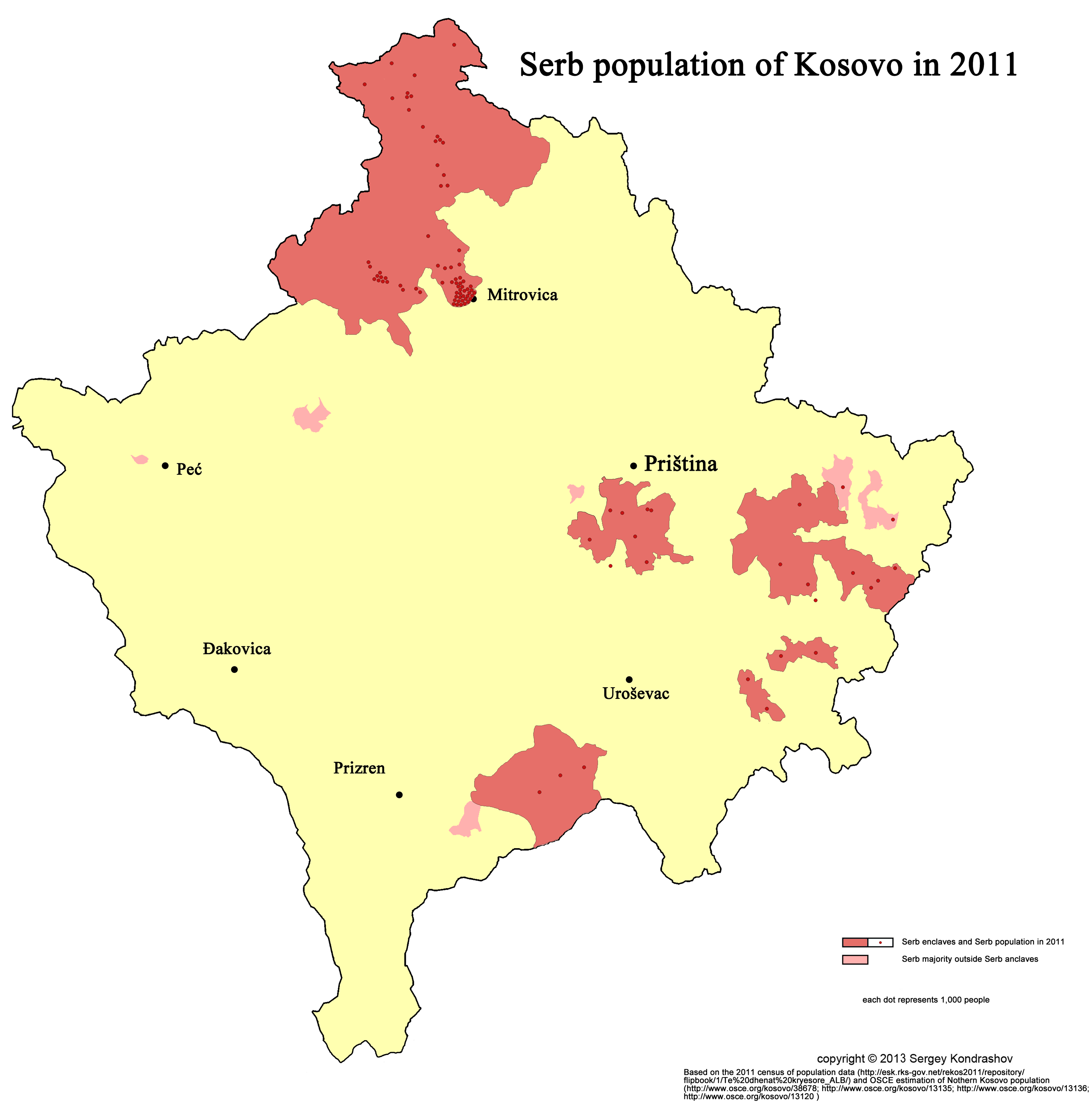
Serb-populated areas
(in red) in Kosovo, 2011

== Politics ==
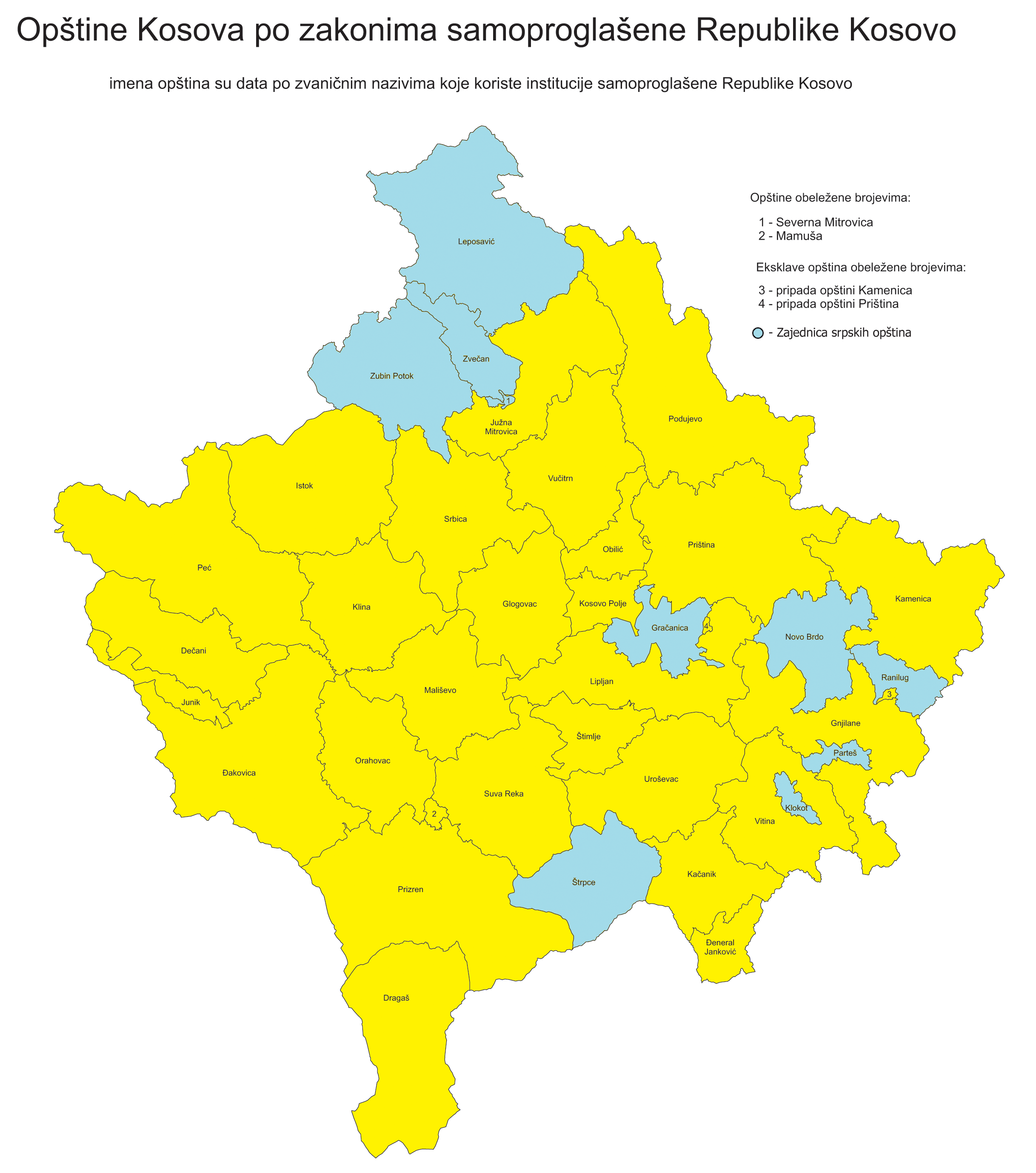
Community of Serb Municipalities

The Community of Serb Municipalities (Serbian: Заједница српских општина, romanized: Zajednica srpskih opština) is a planned self-governing association of the ten majority-Serb municipalities in Kosovo, agreed in the 2013 Brussels Agreement between Serbia and Kosovo. It is intended to give the Kosovo Serb community collective rights and coordination powers in education, healthcare, urban and rural planning, and local economic development. This agreement represents an important step in process of accession of Serbia to the European Union. Despite being signed more than a decade ago and repeatedly confirmed as a key EU-facilitated obligation for both sides, Kosovo has consistently refused to establish it, citing fears that it would create a Republika Srpska-like entity.

The Serb List (Serbian: Српска листа, romanized: Srpska lista) is the leading political party representing the Serb community in Kosovo, closely aligned with the Serbian government and historically securing all ten reserved seats for Serbs in the Kosovo Assembly from 2014.

Its main opponent is the Party for Freedom, Justice and Survival which managed to secure one of the ten Serb seats in parliament in the February 2025 parliamentary election.

== Culture ==
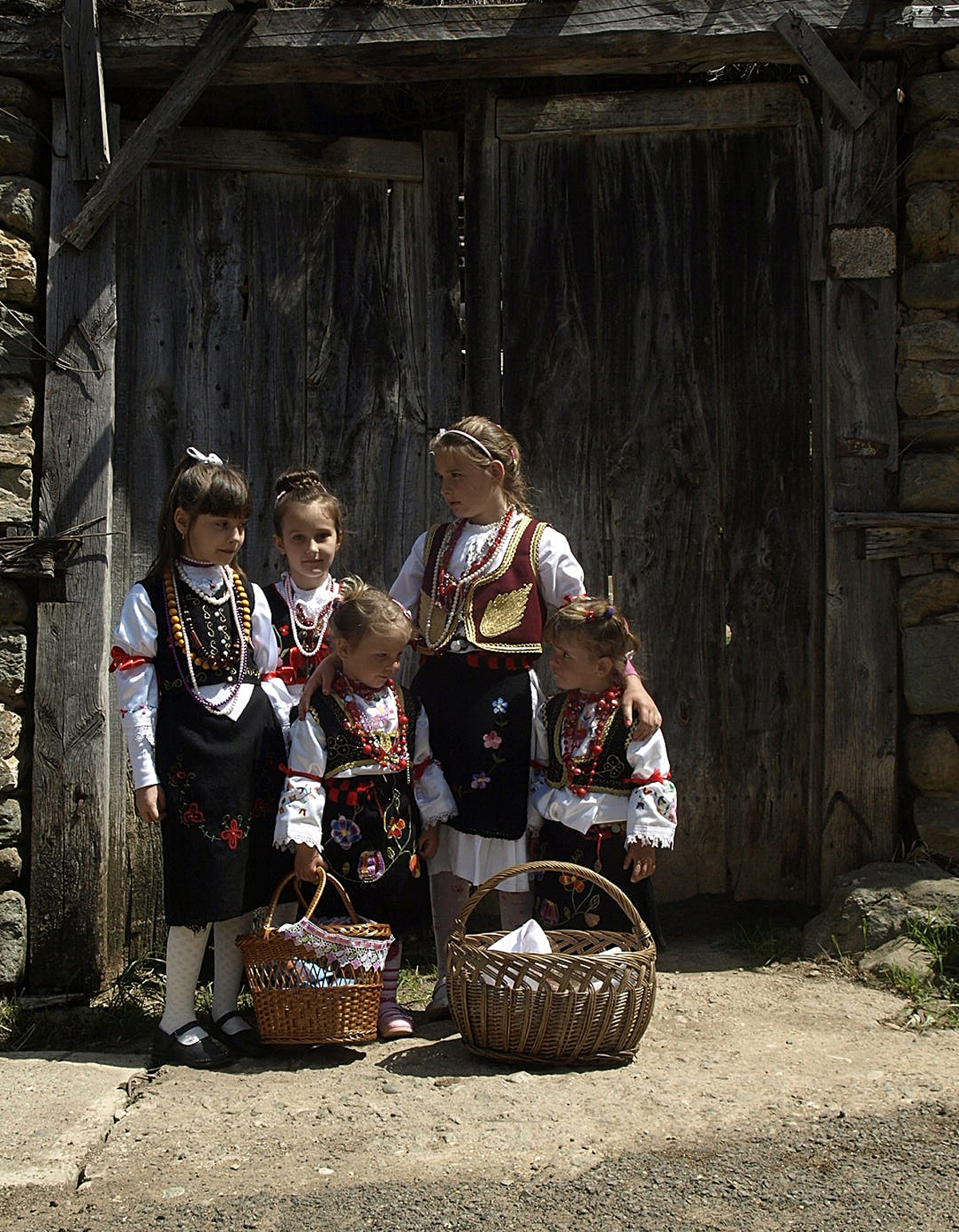
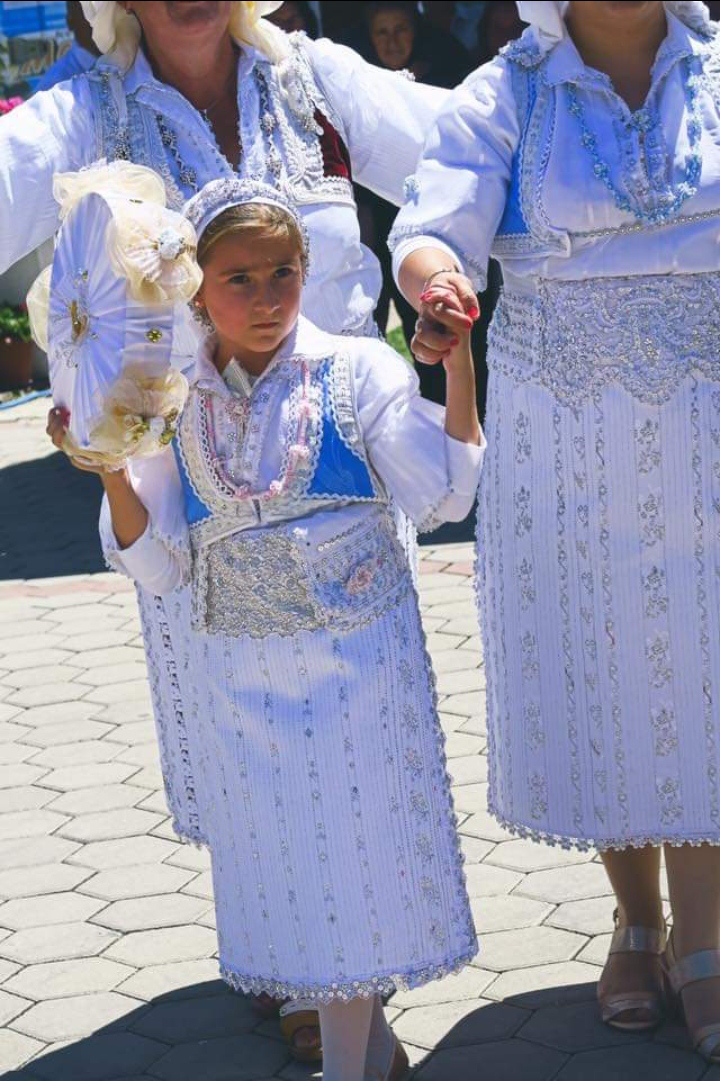
Girls from Štrpce (left) and Parteš (right) in traditional folk costumes

The Kosovo Myth is a Serbian national myth and a major subject in Serbian folklore and literary tradition and has been cultivated through oral epic poetry. The myth portrays Kosovo as the spiritual and cultural heart of Serbia, with the narrative having historically been used to emphasize Serb identity of the region.

Numerous Serbian Orthodox monasteries and churches are spread around Kosovo, including Gračanica Monastery, Patriarchate of Peć Monastery, Visoki Dečani Monastery, and Our Lady of Ljeviš that make up the Medieval Monuments in Kosovo listed as the World Heritage Site.

In connection with social gatherings among the Kosovo Serbs around the churches and monasteries called Sabori during the Slava and Hram (Patron of the monastery) there was a belief that everyone must dance (to instrumental accompaniments) in order to gain and secure good health.

Serbian folk music is rich in a large number of songs from Kosovo, which were especially preserved in the performances of Jordan Nikolić and Mara Đorđević.

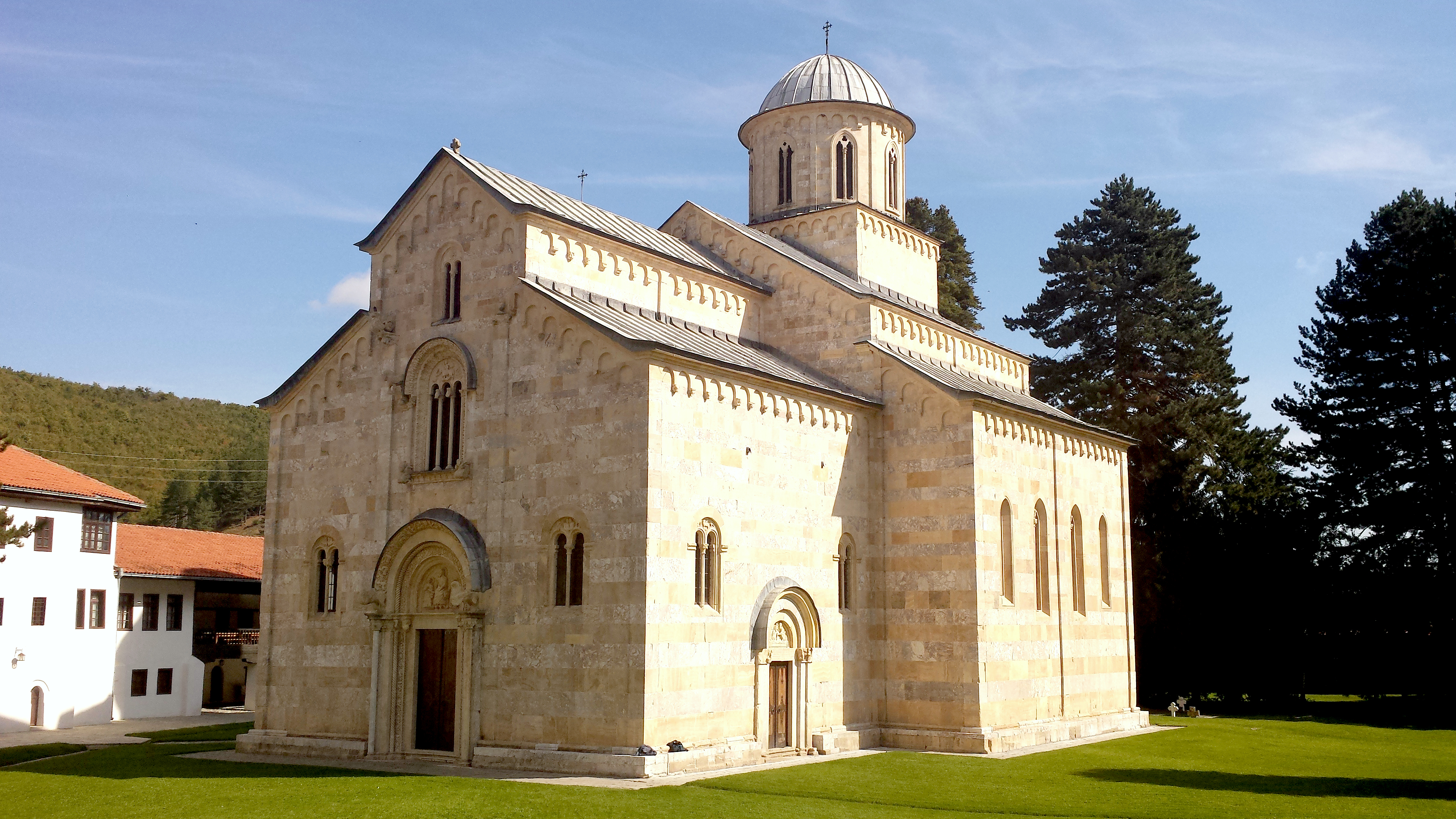
Visoki Dečani Monastery

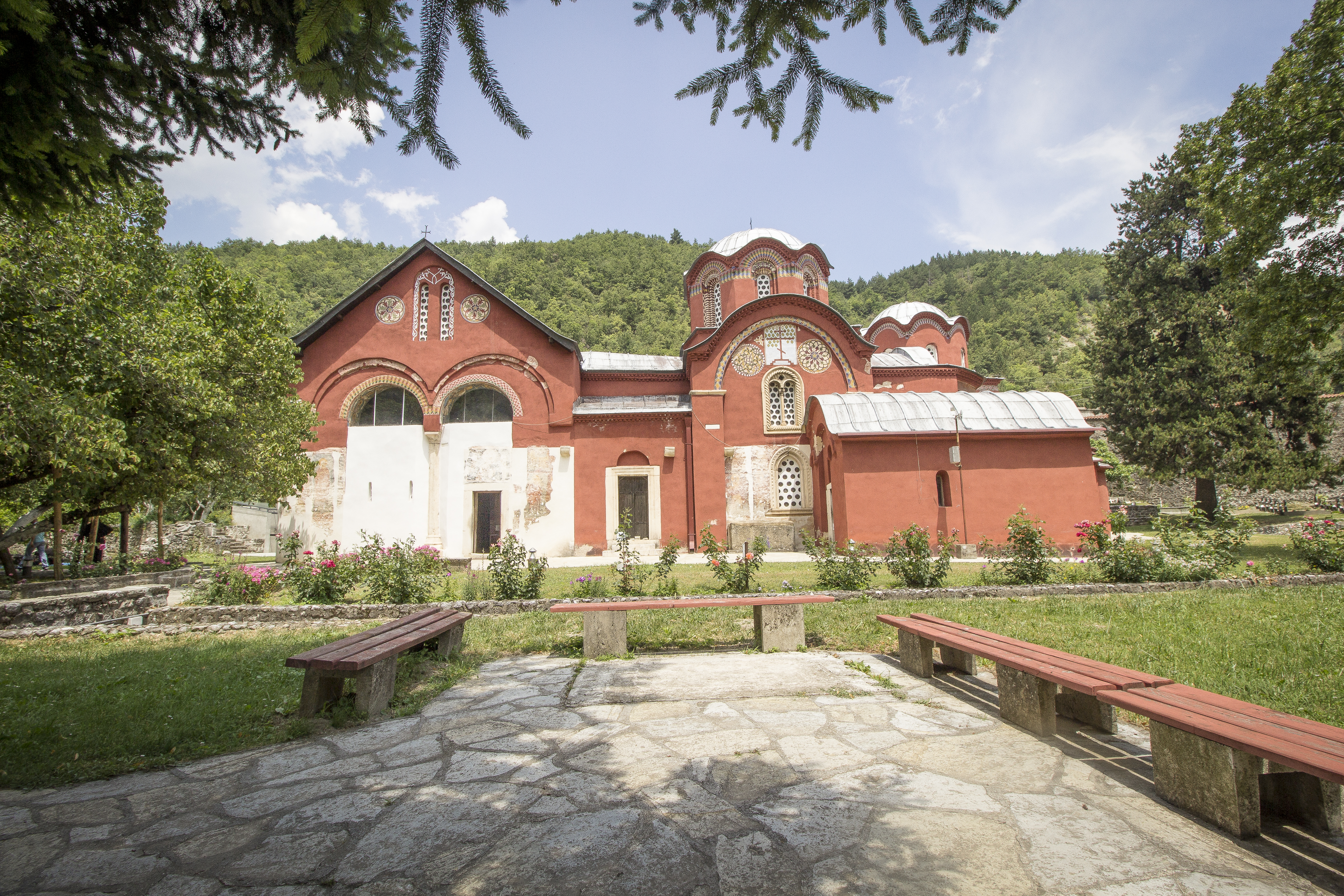
Patriarchate of Peć

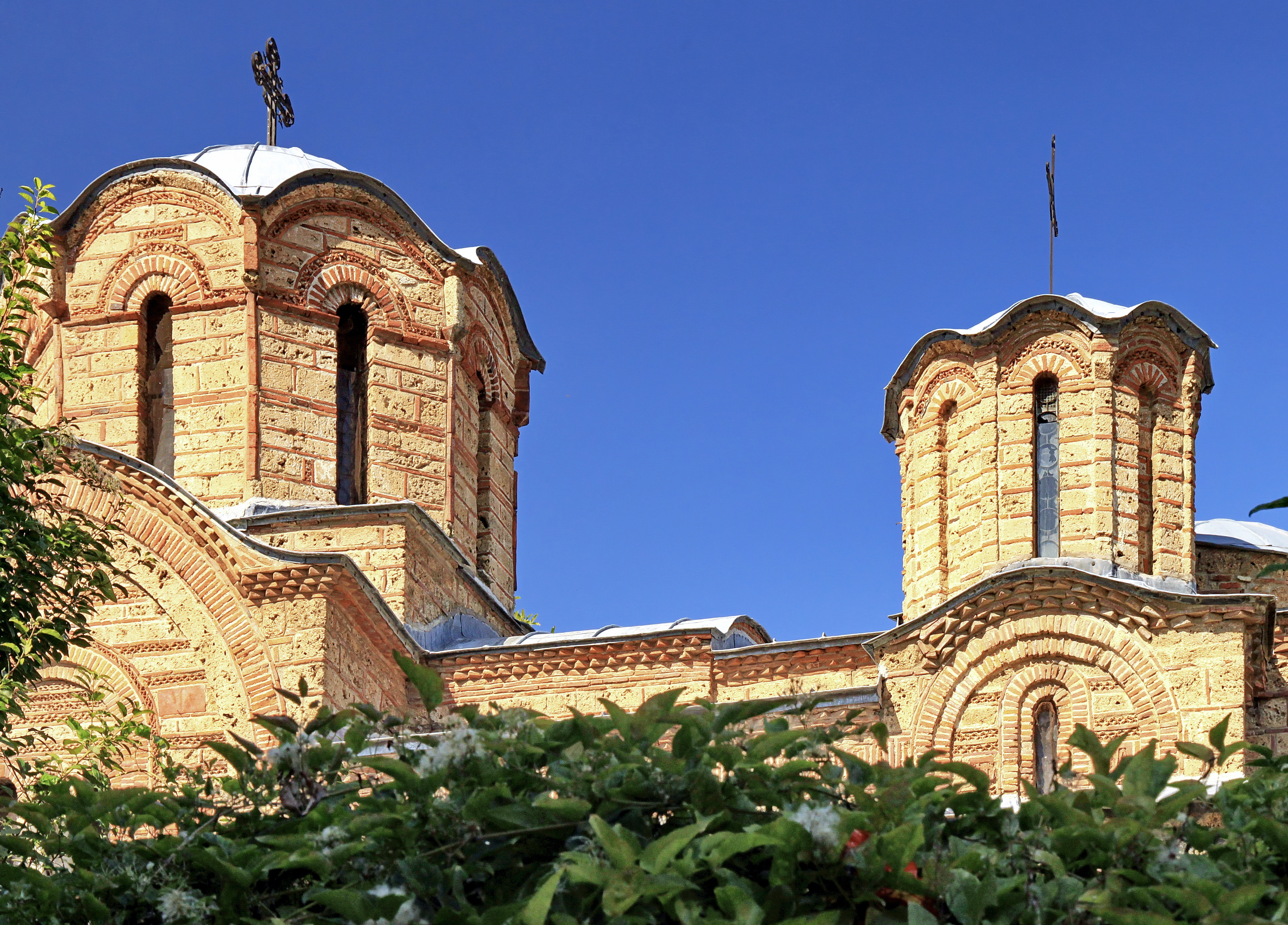
Our Lady of Ljeviš

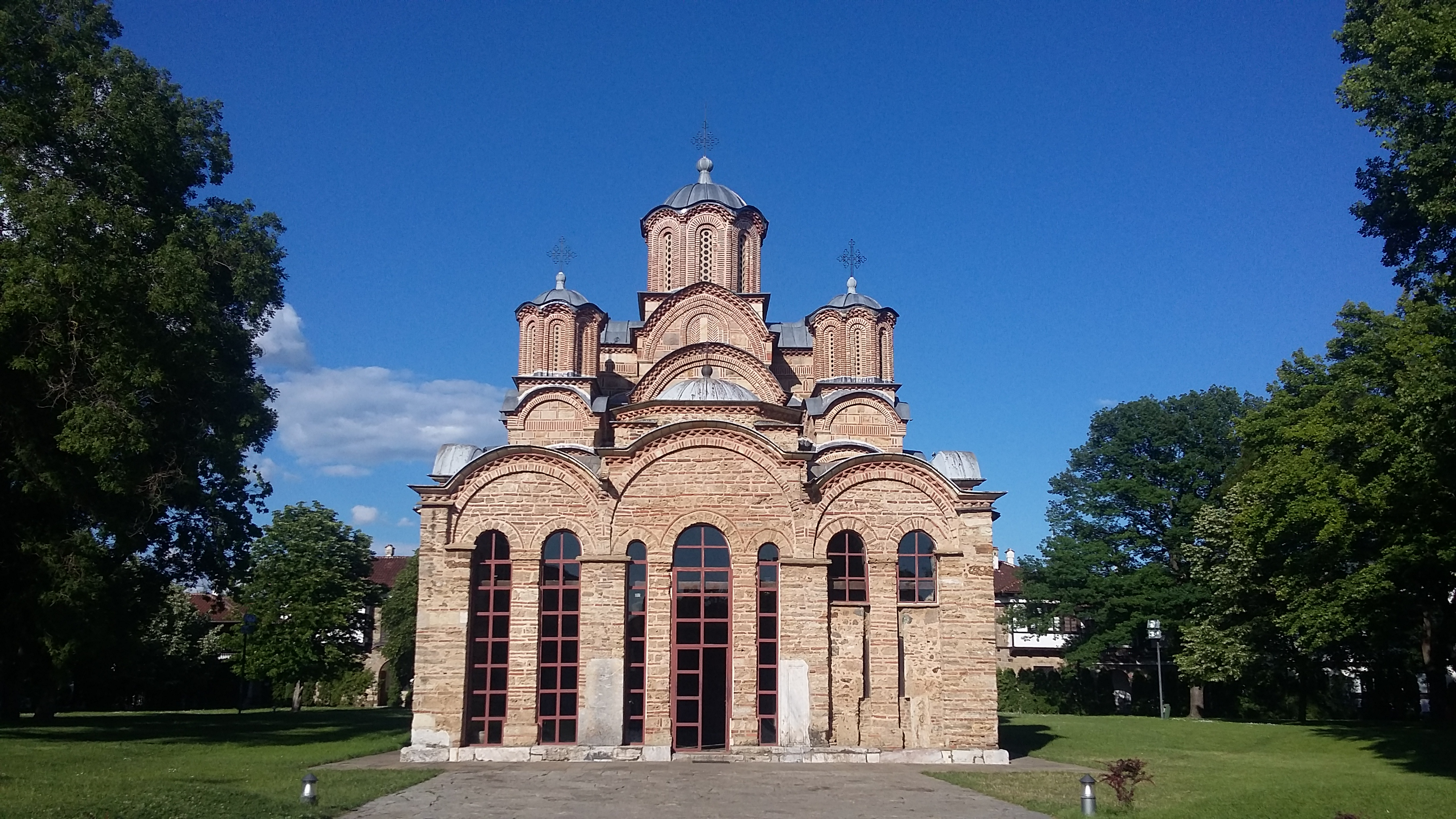
Gračanica Monastery

== Notable people ==
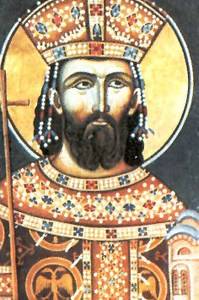
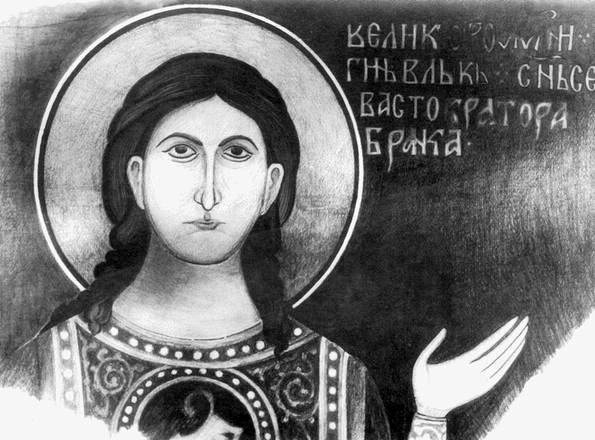
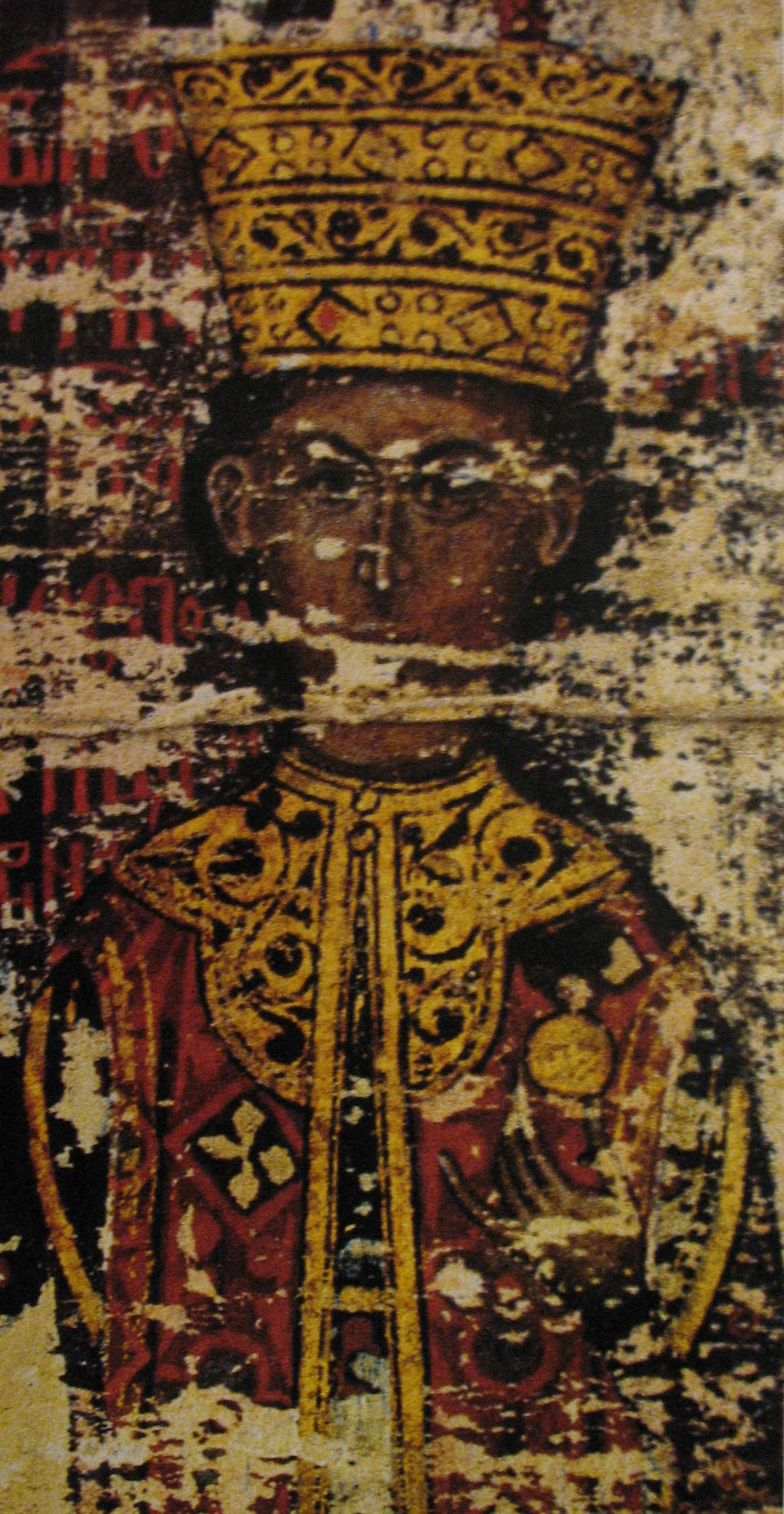
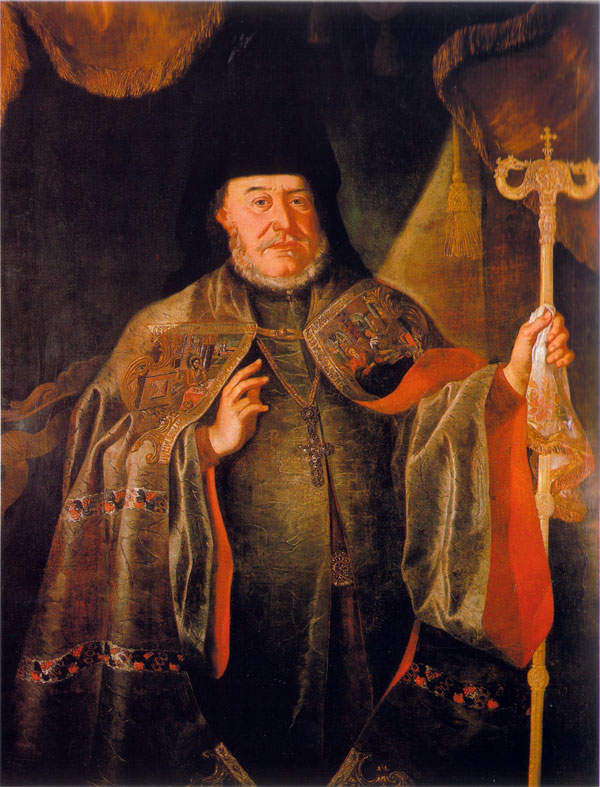
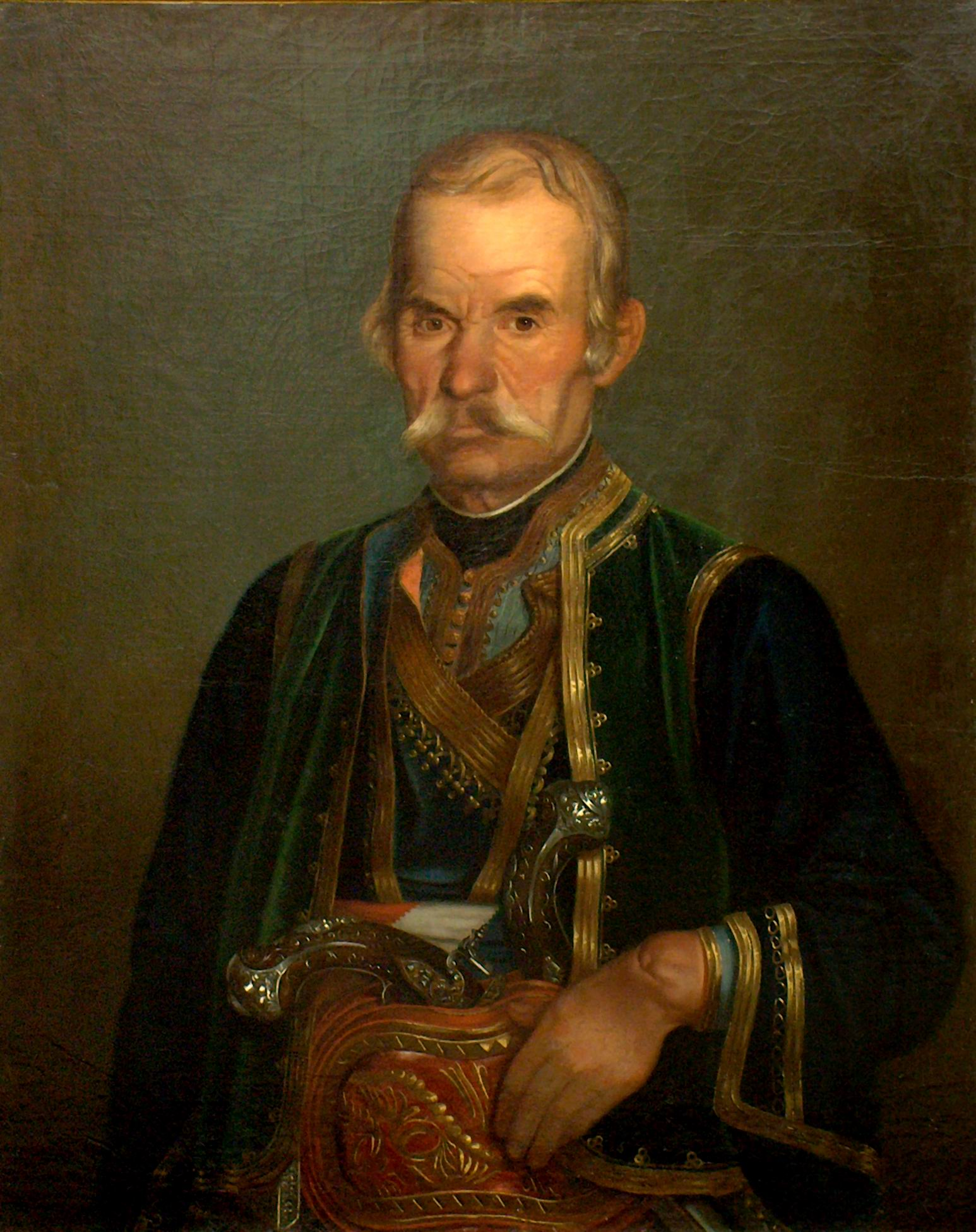
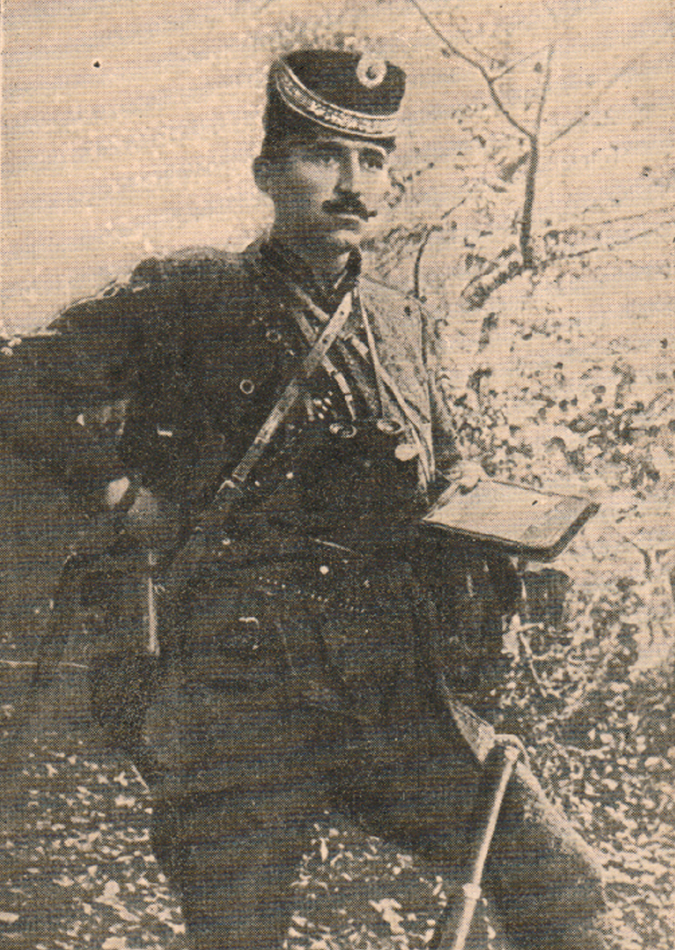
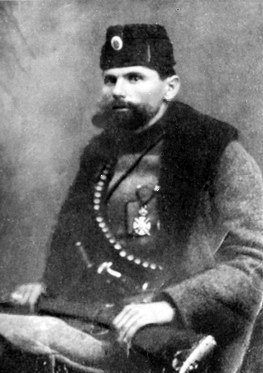
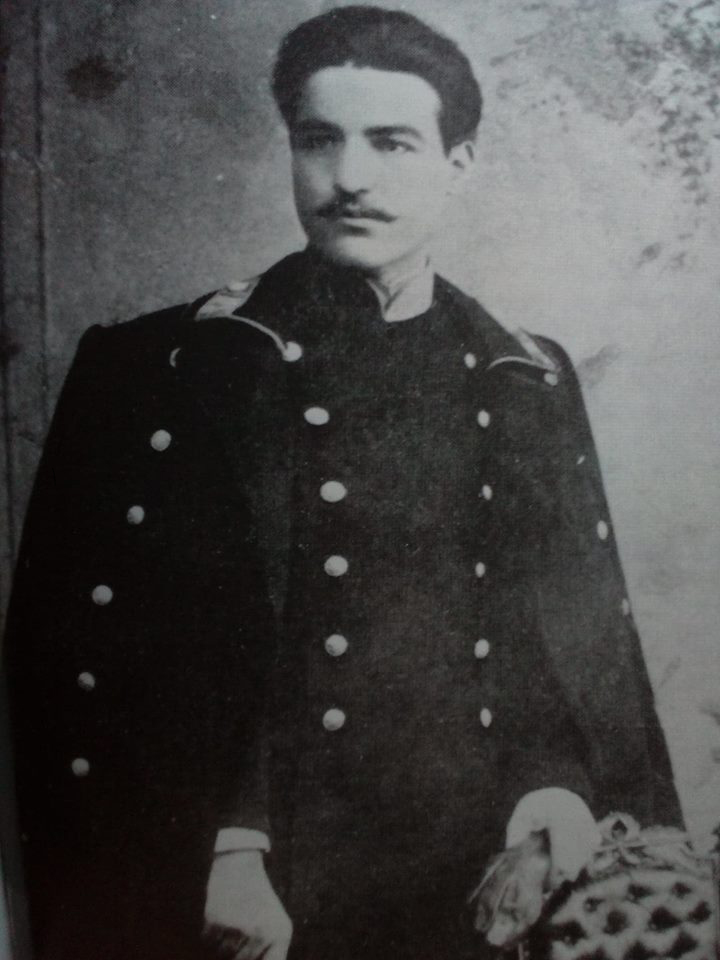
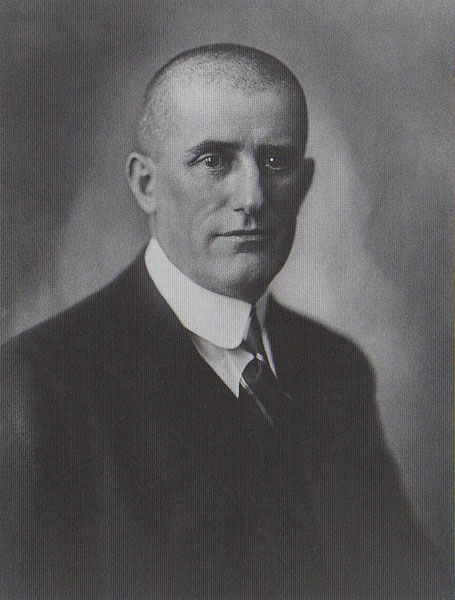
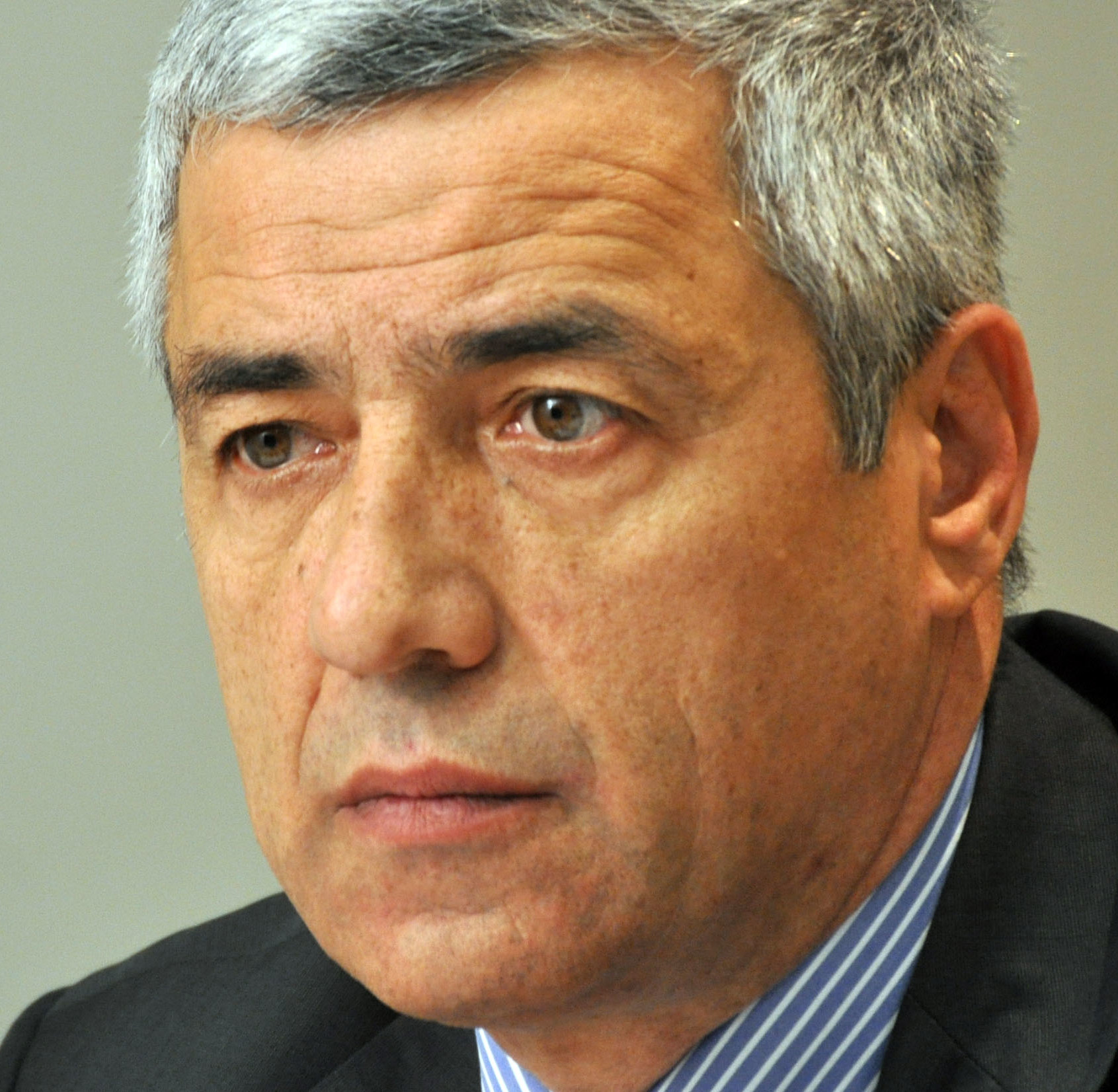
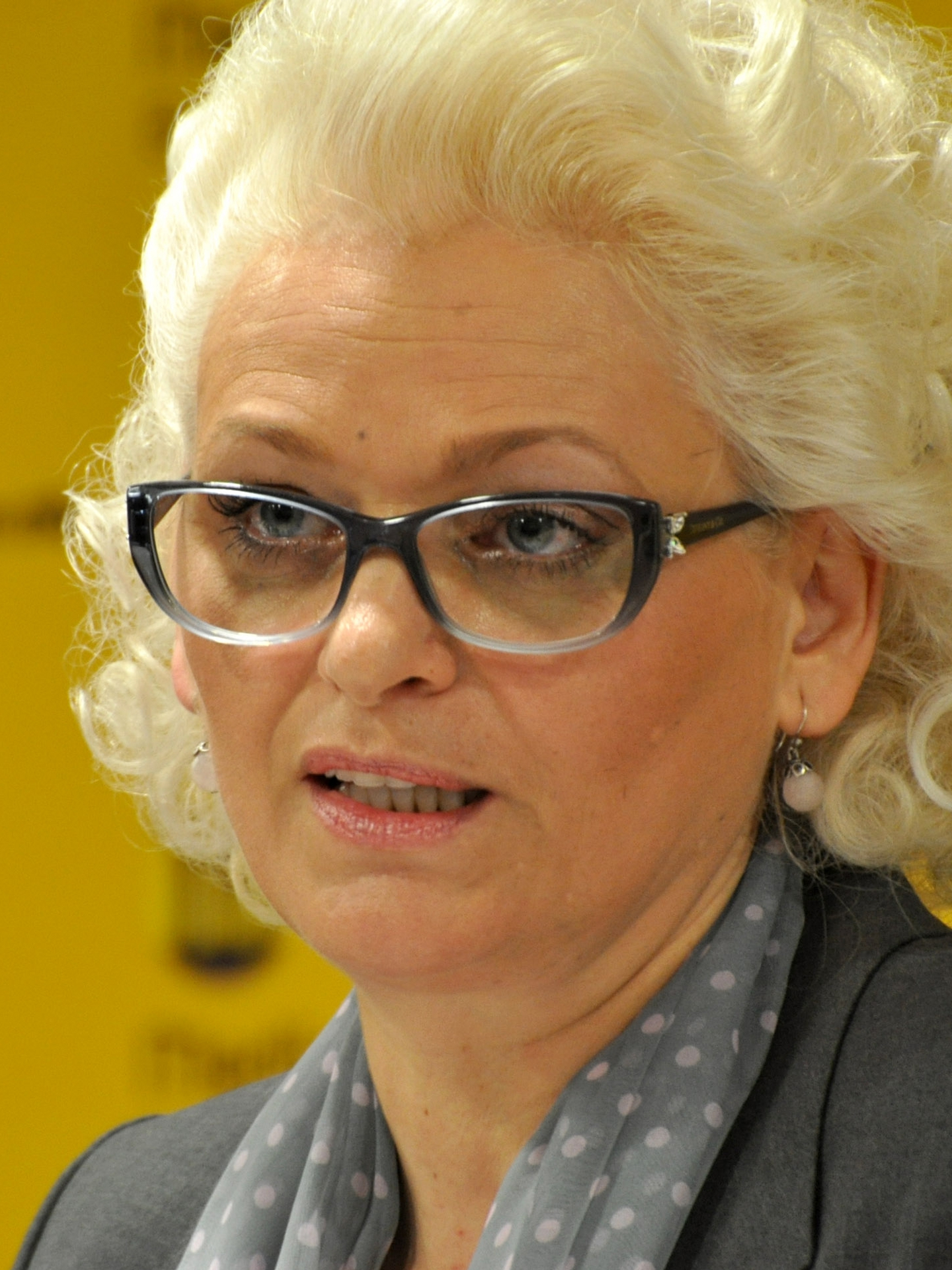
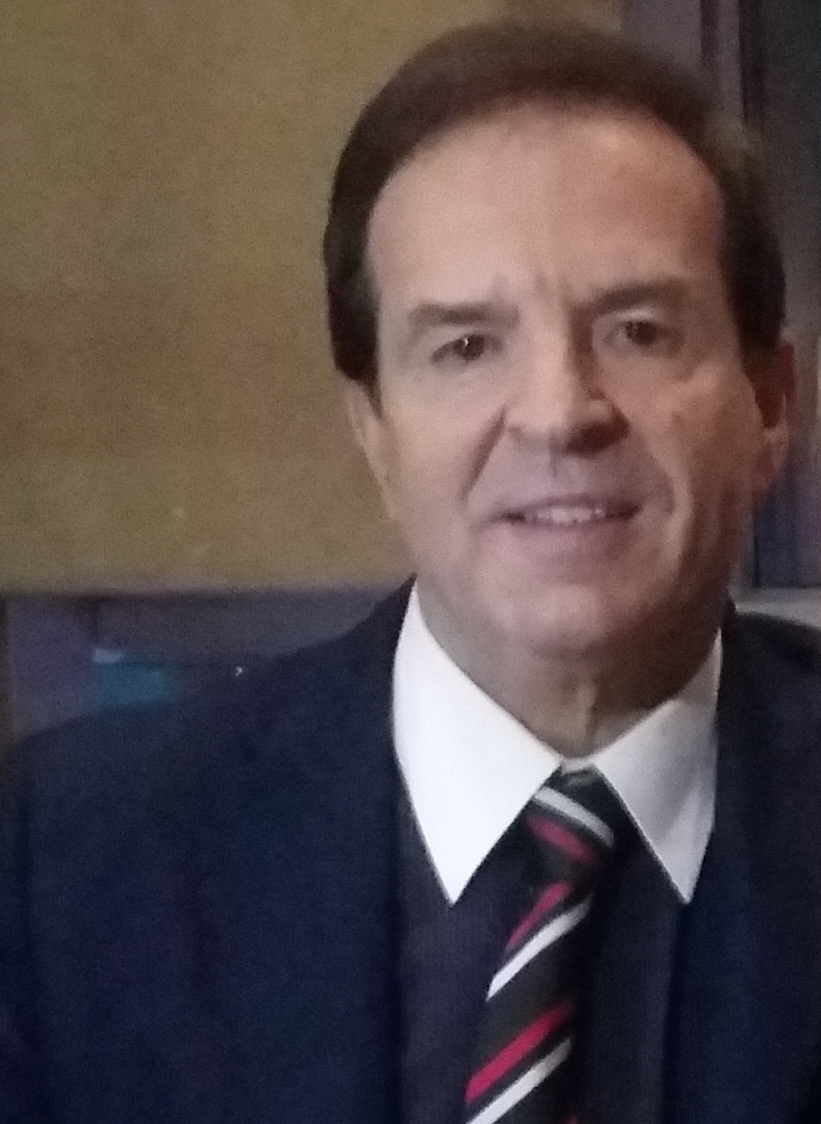
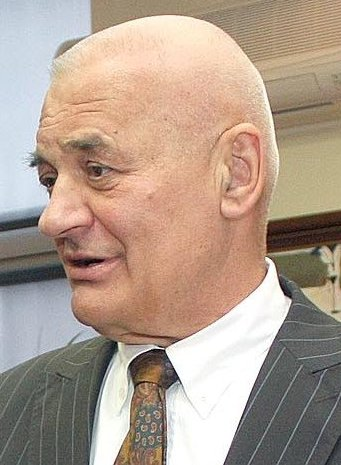
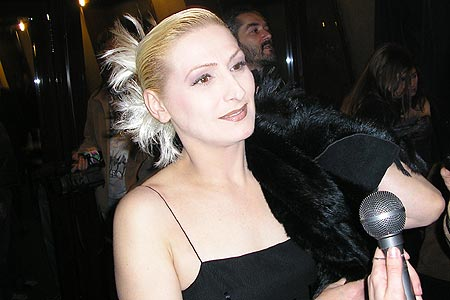
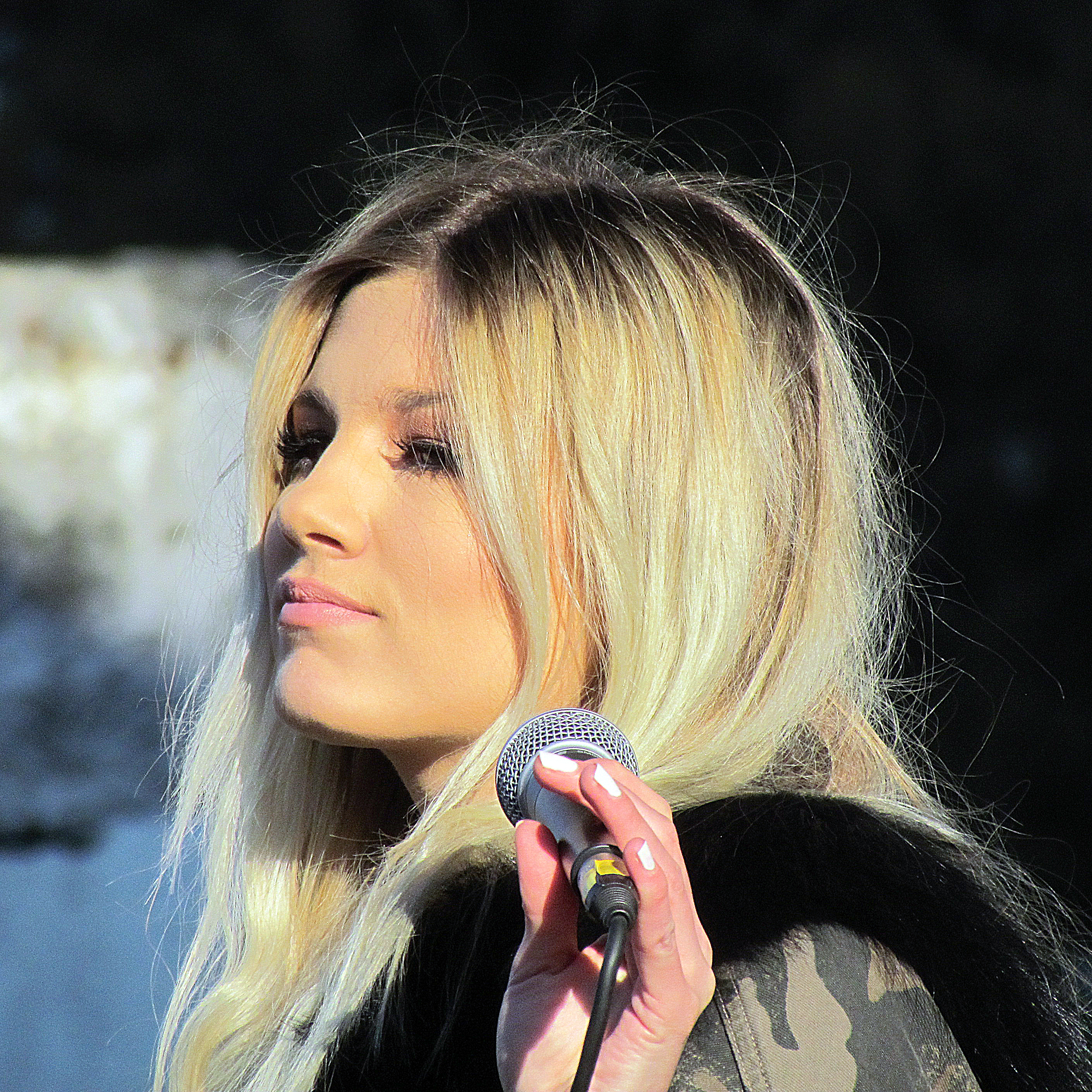
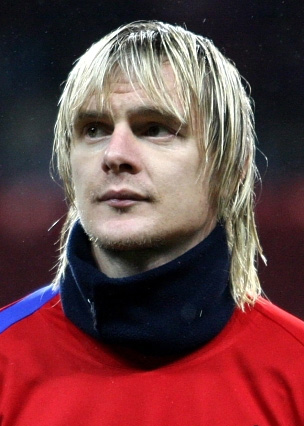
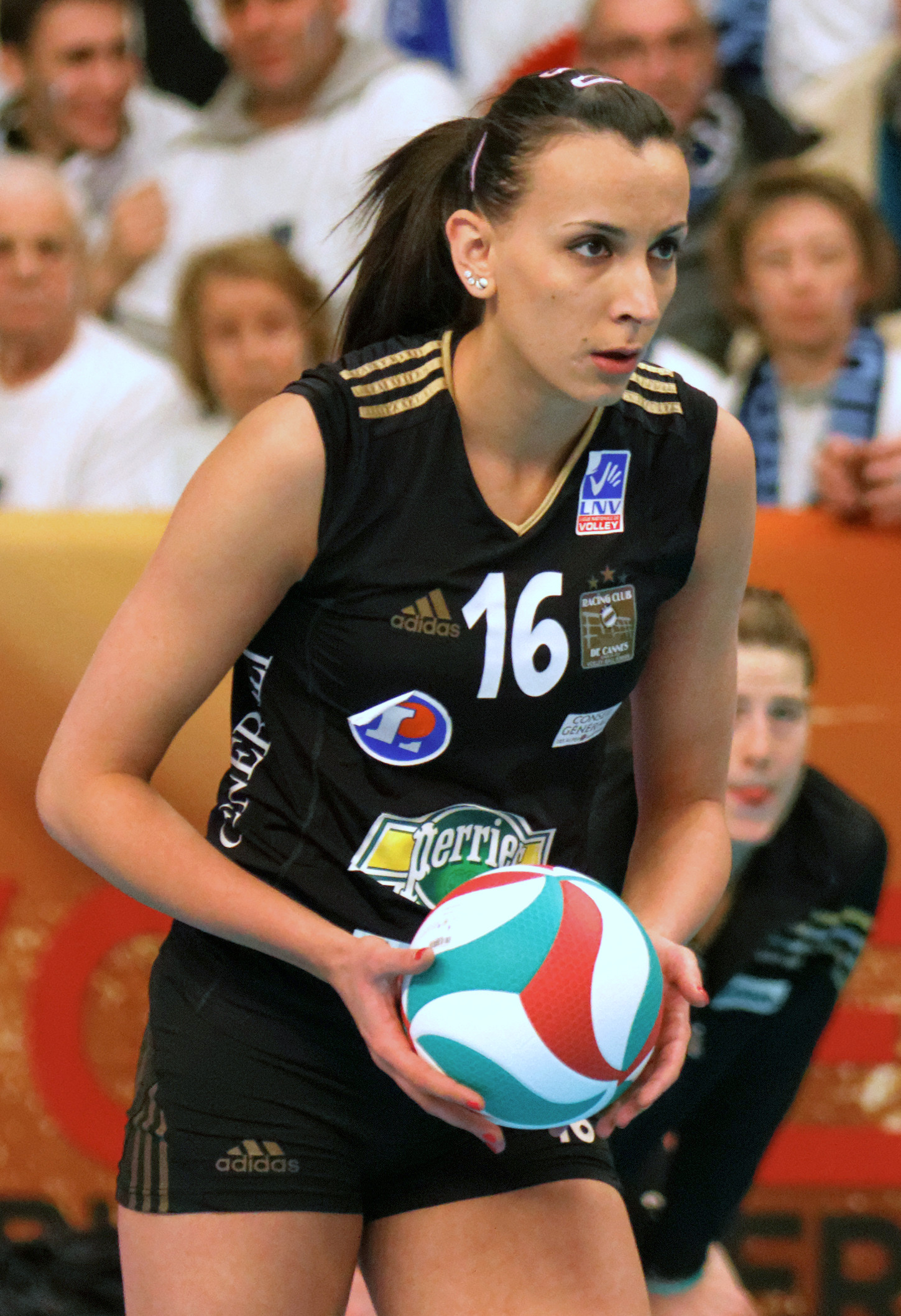
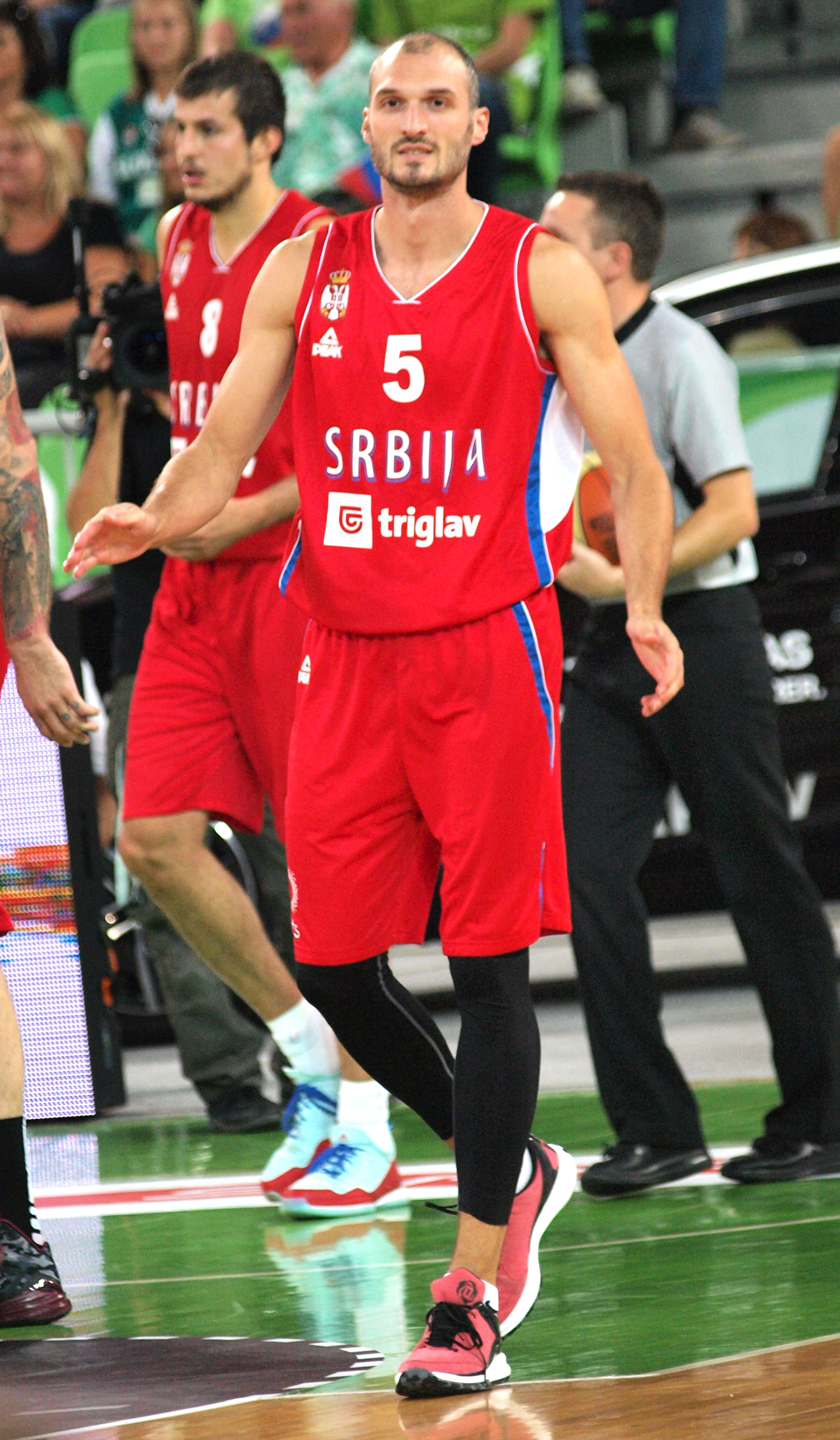
Prince Lazar	Vuk Branković	Mara Branković	Arsenije IV	Čolak Anta	Kosta Vojinović	Kosta Pećanac	Grigorije Božović	Gligorije Elezović
Oliver Ivanović	Jorgovanka Tabaković	Bogoljub Karić	Aleksandar Tijanić	Viktorija	Nevena Božović	Miloš Krasić	Milena Rašić	Marko Simonović

- Mahmud Pasha Angelović – Ottoman Grand Vizier
- Čolak-Anta Simeonović – military commander
- Svetomir Arsić-Basara – sculptor
- Milan Biševac – football player
- Grigorije Božović – writer
- Nevena Božović – singer
- Vukajlo Božović – military commander
- Đurađ Branković – Serbian Despot
- Mara Branković – Khatun
- Vuk Branković – Serbian Despot
- Dragica Radosavljević Cakana – singer
- Božidar Delić – general
- Vladimir Durković – football player
- Goran Đorović – football player
- Gligorije Elezović – historian
- Vladislav the Grammarian – theologian
- Živko Gvozdić – military officer
- Vikentije Popović-Hadžilavić – metropolitan
- Vuk Isaković – military commander
- Oliver Ivanović – politician
- Joanikije II – Serbian Patriarch
- Nikola Lazetić – football player
- Dimitrije Kantakuzin – writer
- Bogoljub Karić – businessman
- Miloš Krasić – football player
- Bora Spužić Kvaka – singer
- Sima Igumanov – philanthropist
- Dragan Maksimović - actor
- Radivoje Milojković – politician
- Milan Mojsilović – general
- Bogoljub Nedeljković – politician
- Jordan Nikolić – singer
- Pajsije – Serbian Patriarch
- Kosta Pećanac – Chetnik commander
- Marko Pećki – writer and poet
- Grigorije of Prizren – writer
- Bogdan Radenković – activist
- Veljko Radenović – general
- Stefan Đurić Rasta – musician
- Milena Rašić – volleyball player
- Dragana of Serbia – Empress Consort of Bulgaria
- Lazar of Serbia – prince
- Marko Simonović – basketball player
- Stevan Stojanović – football player
- Arsenije IV – Serbian Patriarch
- Jorgovanka Tabaković – politician
- Aleksandar Tijanić – journalist
- Milutin Šoškić – football player
- Ilija Vakić – politician
- Viktorija – singer
- Boro Vukmirović – Yugoslav Partisan

== See also ==
- Kosovo–Serbia relations
- Eparchy of Raška and Prizren

== Sources ==
- Антонијевић, Ненад (2009). Албански злочини над Србима на Косову и Метохији у Другом светском рату: Документа (PDF) (2nd ed.). Музеј жртава геноцида.
- Bogdanović, Dimitrije (1986) [25 December 1984]. The Kosovo Question Past and Present. Serbian Academy Of Sciences And Arts Monographs. Vol. DLXVI.
- Božović, Branislav (1991). Surova vremena na Kosovu i Metohiji: kvislinzi i kolaboracija u drugom svetskom ratu. Institut za savremenu istoriju. ISBN 9788674030400.
- Bulić, Dejan (2013). "The Fortifications of the Late Antiquity and the Early Byzantine Period on the Later Territory of the South-Slavic Principalities, and their re-occupation". The World of the Slavs: Studies of the East, West and South Slavs: Civitas, Oppidas, Villas and Archeological Evidence (7th to 11th Centuries AD). Belgrade: The Institute for History. pp. 137–234. ISBN 978-86-7743-104-4.
- Ćirković, Sima (2004). The Serbs. Blackwell Publishing. ISBN 9781405142915.
- Cocozelli, Fred (2016). "The Serbs of Kosovo". In Ramet, Sabrina (ed.). Ethnic Minorities and Politics in Post-Socialist Southeastern Europe. Cambridge University Press. ISBN 978-1-316982778.
- Cox, John K. (2002). The History of Serbia. Greenwood Press. ISBN 9780313312908.
- Curta, Florin (2006). Southeastern Europe in the Middle Ages, 500–1250. Cambridge: Cambridge University Press. ISBN 978-0-521-81539-0.
- Fine, John Van Antwerp Jr. (1991) [1983]. The Early Medieval Balkans: A Critical Survey from the Sixth to the Late Twelfth Century. Ann Arbor, Michigan: University of Michigan Press. ISBN 0-472-08149-7.
- Fine, John Van Antwerp Jr. (1994) [1987]. The Late Medieval Balkans: A Critical Survey from the Late Twelfth Century to the Ottoman Conquest. Ann Arbor, Michigan: University of Michigan Press. ISBN 0472082604.
- Fischer, Bernd J. (1999). Albania at War, 1939-1945. C. Hurst & Co. Publishers. ISBN 978-1-85065-531-2.
- Ivić, Pavle, ed. (1995). The History of Serbian Culture. Porthill Publishers. ISBN 9781870732314.
- Krsmanović, Bojana (2008). The Byzantine Province in Change: On the Threshold Between the 10th and the 11th Century. Belgrade: Institute for Byzantine Studies. ISBN 978-960-371-060-8.
- Mojzes, Paul (2011). Balkan Genocides: Holocaust and Ethnic Cleansing in the 20th Century. Rowman & Littlefield. ISBN 9781442206632.
- Samardžić, Renata; Nešić, Danijela; Simeunović, Dragan; Zirojević, Mina (2022). Uništavanje i prisvajanje kulturnog nasleđa: Od Luvra do Kosova i Palmire. Belgrade: Službeni glasnik. ISBN 978-86-519-2761-7.
- Stephenson, Paul (2000). Byzantium's Balkan Frontier: A Political Study of the Northern Balkans, 900-1204. Cambridge University Press. ISBN 9780521770170.
- Stephenson, Paul (2003). The Legend of Basil the Bulgar-Slayer. Cambridge: Cambridge University Press. ISBN 978-0-521-81530-7.
- Šuica, Marko (2011). "The Image of the Battle of Kosovo (1389) Today: a Historic Event, a Moral Pattern, or the Tool of Political Manipulation". The Uses of the Middle Ages in Modern European States: History, Nationhood and the Search for Origins. New York: Palgrave Macmillan. pp. 152–174. ISBN 9780230283107.
- Živković, Tibor (2008). Forging unity: The South Slavs between East and West 550-1150. Belgrade: The Institute of History; Čigoja štampa. ISBN 978-86-7558-573-2.
- Živković, Tibor; Bojanin, Stanoje; Petrović, Vladeta, eds. (2000). Selected Charters of Serbian Rulers (XII-XV Century): Relating to the Territory of Kosovo and Metohia. Center for Studies of Byzantine Civilisation.
- Le Kosovo-Metohija dans l'histoire serbe (in French). L'AGE D'HOMME. 1990. ISBN 978-2-8251-0139-1.
