= Fourth cabinet of Albin Kurti =

Current government of Kosovo

Fourth Kurti cabinet
- Seventeenth cabinet of Kosovo
- 13 September 2026
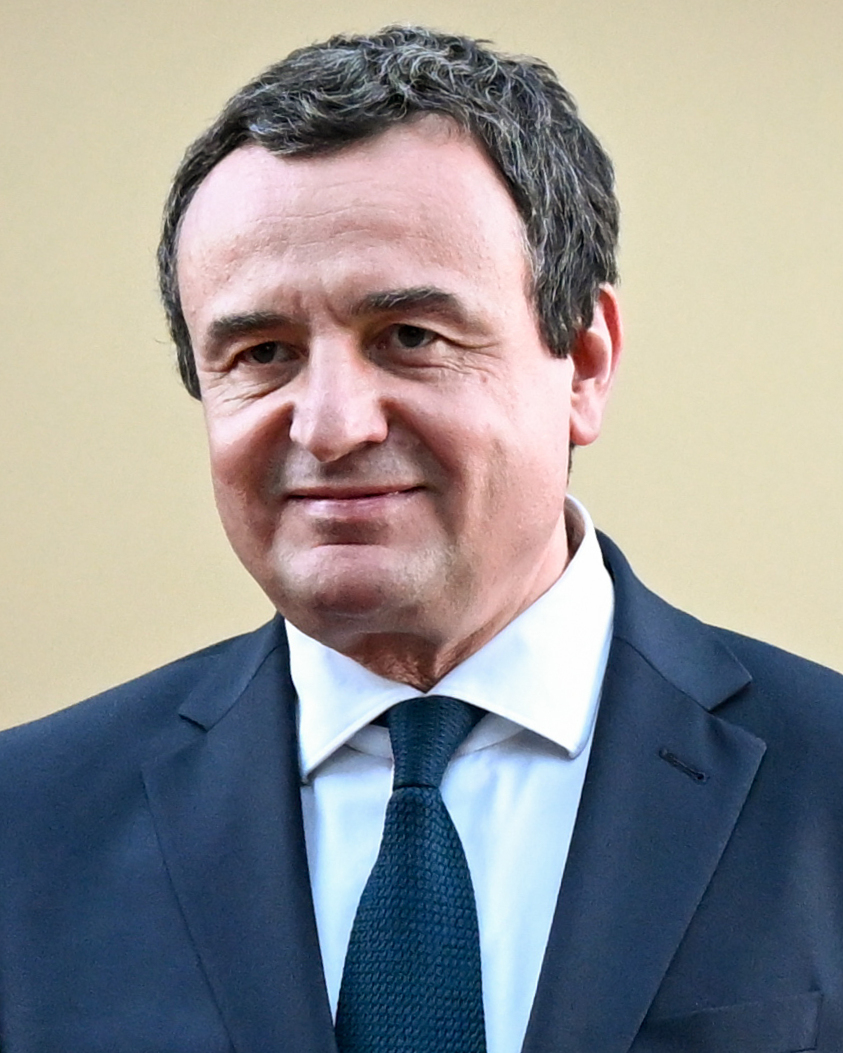
- Date formed: 13 September 2026

People and organisations
- Head of state: Albulena Haxhiu (acting); Justina Shiroka Pula
- Head of government: Albin Kurti
- Member parties: LVV, GUXO, ALTERNATIVA, KDTP, IRDK, VAKAT, ZSPO, with support from LPRK, NDS, PLE and PSA
- Status in legislature: Majority
- Opposition parties: PDK, LDK, AAK, SL, SDU, JGP
- Opposition leaders: Bedri Hamza (PDK); Lumir Abdixhiku (LDK); Ardian Gjini (AAK); Igor Simić (SL); Duda Balje (SDU); Adem Hodža (JGP)

History
- Election: 7 June 2026
- Legislature term: 11th legislature of the Assembly
- Predecessor: Kurti III

The Kurti IV cabinet (Fourth Cabinet of Albin Kurti) was formed in Kosovo on 13 September 2026, following a coalition agreement between the political parties Vetëvendosje, Guxo, Albanian Christian Democratic Party of Kosovo, Alternativa, Progressive Democratic Party, New Democratic Initiative of Kosovo, Turkish Democratic Party of Kosovo, Vakat Coalition and New Democratic Party.

After speculation as to whether Kurti IV was legal, the constitutional court put them to rest on 23 September ruling that the government was elected in accordance with the constitution (despite it being elected well after the constitutional deadline to elect a government)

== Composition ==
The cabinet consists of the following ministers:

Portfolio	Minister	Took office	Left office	Party
Prime Minister of Kosovo	Albin Kurti	13 September 2026	Incumbent	LVV
First Deputy Prime Minister and Minister of Foreign Affairs	Glauk Konjufca	13 September 2026	Incumbent	LVV
Second Deputy Prime Minister and Minister of Justice	Donika Gërvalla-Schwarz	13 September 2026	Incumbent	Guxo
Third Deputy Prime Minister for Minority Issues and Human Rights	Fikrim Damka	13 September 2026	Incumbent	KDTP
Ministry of Agriculture, Forestry and Rural Development	Armend Muja	13 September 2026	Incumbent	LVV
Minister of Communities and Return	Nenad Rašić	13 September 2026	Incumbent	ZSPO
Minister of Culture and Tourism	Saranda Bogujevci	13 September 2026	Incumbent	LVV
Minister of Defence	Ejup Maqedonci	13 September 2026	Incumbent	LVV
Minister of Economy	Artane Rizvanolli	13 September 2026	Incumbent	LVV
Minister of Education, Science and Technology and Innovation	Hajrulla Çeku	13 September 2026	Incumbent	LVV
Minister of Environment and Spatial Planning	Fitore Pacolli	13 September 2026	Incumbent	LVV
Minister of Finance	Hekuran Murati	13 September 2026	Incumbent	LVV
Minister of Health	Arben Vitia	13 September 2026	Incumbent	LVV
Minister of Industry, Entrepreneurship and Trade	Mimoza Kusari-Lila	13 September 2026	Incumbent	Alternativa
Minister of Infrastructure and Transport	Dimal Basha	13 September 2026	Incumbent	LVV
Minister of Internal Affairs	Xhelal Sveçla	13 September 2026	Incumbent	LVV
Minister for Labour, Family, Social Welfare and Values of the Liberation War	Andin Hoti	13 September 2026	Incumbent	LVV
Minister of Local Administration	Elbert Krasniqi	13 September 2026	Incumbent	IRDK
Minister of Public Administration and Digitalization	Lulëzon Jagxhiu	13 September 2026	Incumbent	LVV
Minister of Regional Development	Rasim Demiri	13 September 2026	Incumbent	Vakat
Minister of Youth and Sports	Blerim Gashani	13 September 2026	Incumbent	Guxo
