= Government of Kosovo =

- Albanian: Qeveria e Kosovës; Serbian: Влада Косова / Vlada Kosova
- Central government

Overview
- Established: 17 February 2008
- Polity: Kosovo
- Leader: Prime Minister of Kosovo
- Appointed by: President of Kosovo
- Main organ: Cabinet
- Responsible to: Assembly of the Republic of Kosovo
- Headquarters: Government Building, Pristina
- Website: http://www.rks-gov.net

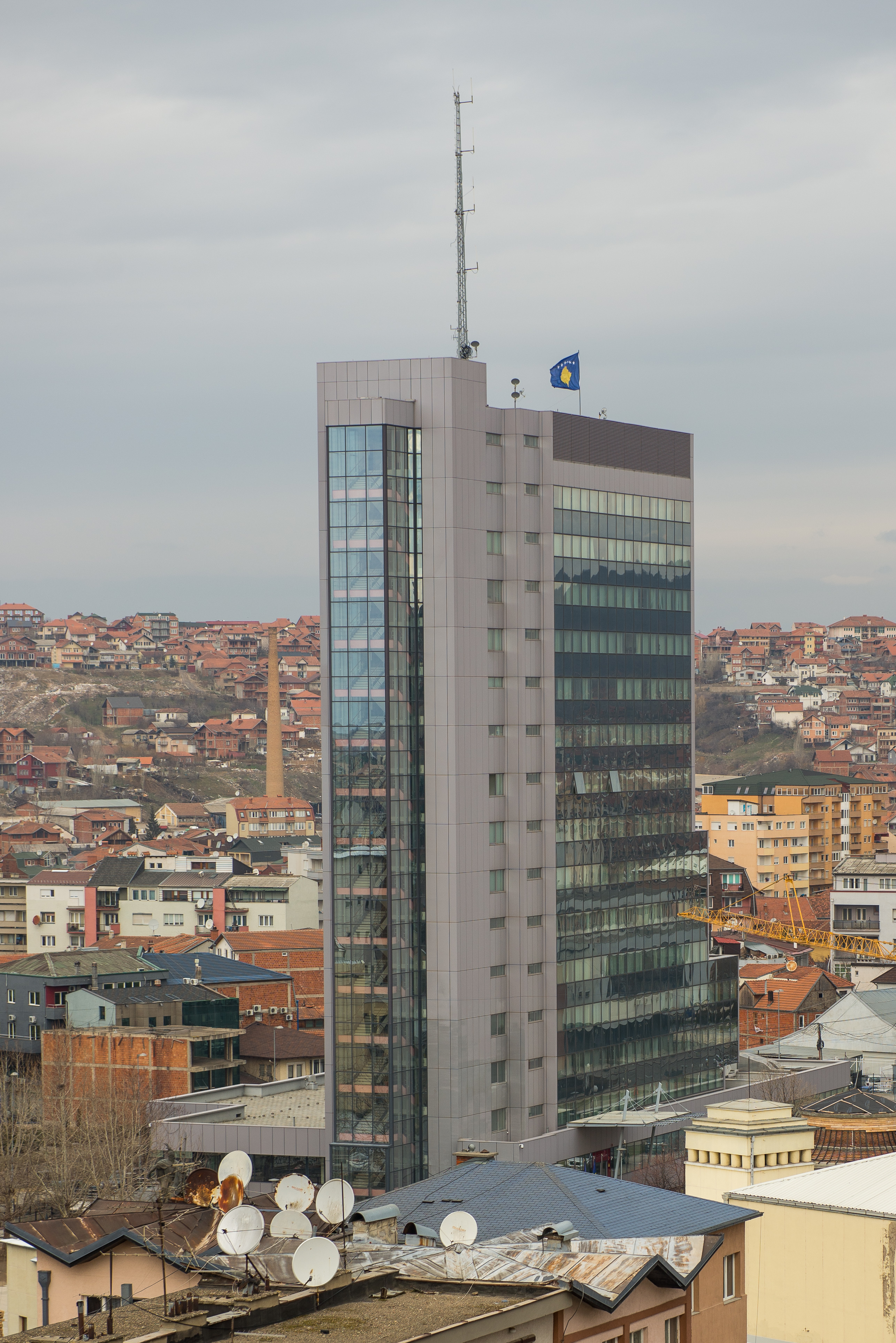
Government building in Pristina.

The Government of Kosovo (Albanian: Qeveria e Kosovës, Serbian: Влада Косова / Vlada Kosova) exercises executive authority in the Republic of Kosovo. It is composed of government ministers, and is led by the prime minister. The prime minister is elected by the Assembly of the Republic of Kosovo. Ministers are nominated by the prime minister and then confirmed by the assembly.

Albin Kurti is the current prime minister of Kosovo. His government, approved by the assembly and installed on March 22, 2021, consists of Albanians, as well as ministers from Kosovo's ethnic minorities, which include Bosniaks, Romani, Turks and Serbs. Although the government includes representatives of ethnic minorities, it is dominated by the Albanian majority, who have most influence on the decision-making.

== Current cabinet ==
The cabinet consists of the following ministers:

Portfolio	Minister	Took office	Left office	Party
Prime Minister of Kosovo	Albin Kurti	13 September 2026	Incumbent	LVV
First Deputy Prime Minister and Minister of Foreign Affairs	Glauk Konjufca	13 September 2026	Incumbent	LVV
Second Deputy Prime Minister and Minister of Justice	Donika Gërvalla-Schwarz	13 September 2026	Incumbent	Guxo
Third Deputy Prime Minister for Minority Issues and Human Rights	Fikrim Damka	13 September 2026	Incumbent	KDTP
Ministry of Agriculture, Forestry and Rural Development	Armend Muja	13 September 2026	Incumbent	LVV
Minister of Communities and Return	Nenad Rašić	13 September 2026	Incumbent	ZSPO
Minister of Culture and Tourism	Saranda Bogujevci	13 September 2026	Incumbent	LVV
Minister of Defence	Ejup Maqedonci	13 September 2026	Incumbent	LVV
Minister of Economy	Artane Rizvanolli	13 September 2026	Incumbent	LVV
Minister of Education, Science and Technology and Innovation	Hajrulla Çeku	13 September 2026	Incumbent	LVV
Minister of Environment and Spatial Planning	Fitore Pacolli	13 September 2026	Incumbent	LVV
Minister of Finance	Hekuran Murati	13 September 2026	Incumbent	LVV
Minister of Health	Arben Vitia	13 September 2026	Incumbent	LVV
Minister of Industry, Entrepreneurship and Trade	Mimoza Kusari-Lila	13 September 2026	Incumbent	Alternativa
Minister of Infrastructure and Transport	Dimal Basha	13 September 2026	Incumbent	LVV
Minister of Internal Affairs	Xhelal Sveçla	13 September 2026	Incumbent	LVV
Minister for Labour, Family, Social Welfare and Values of the Liberation War	Andin Hoti	13 September 2026	Incumbent	LVV
Minister of Local Administration	Elbert Krasniqi	13 September 2026	Incumbent	IRDK
Minister of Public Administration and Digitalization	Lulëzon Jagxhiu	13 September 2026	Incumbent	LVV
Minister of Regional Development	Rasim Demiri	13 September 2026	Incumbent	Vakat
Minister of Youth and Sports	Blerim Gashani	13 September 2026	Incumbent	Guxo

== Former cabinets ==
Assumed office	Prime Minister	Composition	Cabinet	Election
7 September 1990	Jusuf Zejnullahu		Zejnullahu	
19 October 1991	Bujar Bukoshi		Bukoshi	
2 April 1999	Hashim Thaçi	UÇK, LBD, LDK, LKÇK, PBD, PSHDK, SDA, UPSUP	Thaçi I	
15 December 1999	none		Interim	
4 March 2002	Bajram Rexhepi		Rexhepi	2001
3 December 2004	Ramush Haradinaj		Haradinaj I	2004
8 March 2005	Adem Salihaj		Salihaj	2004
25 March 2005	Bajram Kosumi		Kosumi	2004
10 March 2006	Agim Çeku		Çeku	2004
9 January 2008	Hashim Thaçi	PDK, LDK, KDTP, SL	Thaçi II	2007; 2010
17 February 2008	Hashim Thaçi	PDK, AKR, KDTP, SL	Thaçi III	2007; 2010
9 December 2014	Isa Mustafa	LDK, PDK, SL, KDTP, LB, PD, Vakat	Mustafa	2014
9 September 2017	Ramush Haradinaj	PDK, AAK, NISMA, AKR, SL	Haradinaj II	2017
3 February 2020	Albin Kurti	LVV, LDK,	Kurti I	2019
3 June 2020	Avdullah Hoti	LDK, AAK, NISMA, AKR, SL	Hoti	2019
22 March 2021	Albin Kurti	LVV, Guxo, IRDK, KDTP, NDS	Kurti II	2021
11 February 2026	Albin Kurti	LVV, Guxo, Alternativa, IRDK, KDTP, Vakat, ZSPO	Kurti III	Dec 2025
13 September 2026	Albin Kurti	LVV, Guxo, Alternativa, IRDK, KDTP, Vakat, ZSPO	Kurti IV	2026

== See also ==
- Politics of Kosovo
