= LGBTQ rights in Kosovo =

- Kosovo
- Legal status: Legal since 1858 when part of the Ottoman Empire, criminalized upon incorporation into the Kingdom of Serbia in 1913, again made legal in 1994 as part of Yugoslavia
- Gender identity: Transgender people not permitted to change legal gender
- Military: Gay, lesbian and bisexual people allowed to serve openly
- Discrimination protections: Sexual orientation constitutional and statutory protections (see below)

Family rights
- Recognition of relationships: No recognition
- Adoption: Any single person allowed to adopt

Lesbian, gay, bisexual, transgender, and queer (LGBTQ) rights in Kosovo have improved in recent years, most notably with the adoption of the new Constitution, banning discrimination based on sexual orientation. Kosovo remains one of the few Muslim-majority countries that holds regular pride parades. Discrimination and stigmatization against the LGBTQ+ community remains very rampant amongst the general population, even though it is outlawed.

The Government of Kosovo is supportive of the country's LGBTQ community. In late 2013, the Parliament Assembly passed a bill to create a coordinating group for the LGBTQ community. On 17 May 2014, well-known politicians and diplomats, including British Ambassador Ian Cliff and several local LGBTQ organizations took to the streets of Pristina to march against homophobia. The event was welcomed by the European Union office in Kosovo, as well as by the government itself. A large LGBTQ flag covered the front side of the government building that night.

== Law regarding same-sex sexual activity ==
=== Ottoman Empire ===
In 1858, the Ottoman Empire, then in control of Kosovo, legalized same-sex intercourse.

=== Yugoslavia ===
The Yugoslav Criminal Code of 1929 banned "lewdness against the order of nature" (anal intercourse). The Socialist Federal Republic of Yugoslavia also restricted the offense to same-sex anal intercourse, with the maximum sentence reduced to 1 to 2 years' imprisonment in 1959.

In 1994, male same-sex sexual intercourse became legal in the Autonomous Province of Kosovo and Metohija when it was a part of the Federal Republic of Yugoslavia.

=== UNMIK period ===
In 2004, during the United Nations Interim Administration Mission in Kosovo (UNMIK) period, the legal age of consent was set at 14 regardless of the individual's gender or sexual orientation, and all sexual offenses were made gender-neutral.

=== Independent era ===
Kosovo declared independence from Serbia in 2008. Same-sex sexual intercourse has remained legal. This period has also seen an increasing visibility for the LGBTQ community, and discussions surrounding such issues have become more mainstream. In 2008, the Constitution of Kosovo was promulgated, containing provisions outlawing discrimination on the basis of sexual orientation, amongst others.

== Recognition of same-sex relationships ==
In 2014, the President of the Constitutional Court said that Kosovo de jure allows same-sex marriage. Article 144(3) of the Constitution of Kosovo requires the Constitutional Court to approve any amendments to the Constitution so as to ensure they do not infringe upon the civil rights previously guaranteed. Article 14 of the Law on Family (Albanian: Ligji për Familjen; Serbian: Zakon o porodici) defines marriage as a "legally registered community of two persons of different sexes," though Kosovo gay rights activists have argued this contradicts the wording of the Constitution and have called on same-sex couples to challenge the law in court.

On 7 July 2020, Minister of Justice Selim Selimi announced that the new Civil Code would allow for same-sex civil partnerships, which the Government of Kosovo planned to introduce within a few months. The move was criticised by some LGBTQ rights groups because it would have entrenched the legal distinction between opposite-sex and same-sex couples. If the civil code was passed, a special law for civil unions would be required. The draft was rejected by the Assembly on 16 March 2022. Only 28 out of 120 MPs voted in favour of the bill.

On 25 April 2024 Prime Minister Albin Kurti announced his government's intention to legalize same-sex unions.

== Discrimination protections ==
Article 24 of the Constitution of Kosovo bans discrimination on a number of grounds, including sexual orientation. Kosovo is one of the few states in Europe with a constitutional ban on discrimination on the basis of sexual orientation. The wording states:

No one shall be discriminated against on grounds of race, color, gender, language, religion, political or other opinion, national or social origin, relation to any community, property, economic and social condition, sexual orientation, birth, disability or other personal status.

The Anti-Discrimination Law of 2004 (Albanian: Ligji Kundër Diskriminimit; Serbian: Zakon protiv diskriminacije) passed by the Kosovo Assembly bans discrimination on the basis of sexual orientation in a variety of fields, including employment, membership of organizations, education, the provision of goods and services, social security and access to housing. The definition of discrimination in this law explicitly includes direct and indirect discrimination, as well as harassment, victimization and segregation.

On 26 May 2015, the Parliament Assembly approved amendments adding gender identity to Kosovo's anti-discrimination law. The amendments took effect in July 2015.

In April 2019, the new Criminal Code of Kosovo went into force, with stronger protections for LGBTQ+ citizens. The law provides additional penalties for the commission of a hate crime motivated by the victim's or victims' sexual orientation or gender identity.

Despite these legal protections, LGBTQ people tend to avoid reporting discrimination or abuse cases to the police. A total of 10 bias-motivated crimes against LGBTQ people were reported to the authorities in 2019, with a further 13 reported to LGBTQ organizations only. In February 2019, authorities initiated a case against an official at the Ministry of Justice who had called for LGBTQ people to be beheaded. Police took him into custody.

== Transgender rights ==
Transgender people are not allowed to legally change their gender in Kosovo, even if they have undergone sex reassignment surgery.

In 2017, a Kosovar citizen, Blert Morina, submitted a court case, seeking to change his name and gender on official identification documents. His request was rejected by Kosovo's Civil Registration Agency. His lawyer said he had requested a constitutional review of the agency's decision in July 2018. In December 2019, the Basic Court of Pristina ruled in Morina's favour, affirming his right to change both his name and sex marker on his identification documents. The lawyer said that "for the first time the court has decided to recognize the right to gender identity without offering evidence for surgical intervention or any medical change". The Ministry of Justice and the Civil Registration Agency have stated that the judgment will not be considered precedent, and other transgender people will have to go through a similar court procedure.

== Military service ==
Lesbian, gay, and bisexual people are allowed to serve openly in the military. However, they may face discrimination by peers when serving openly.

== Blood donation ==
According to a 2018 guideline for "Blood Donation Week", those who have "intimate relationships with the same sex" cannot donate blood.

== Living conditions ==
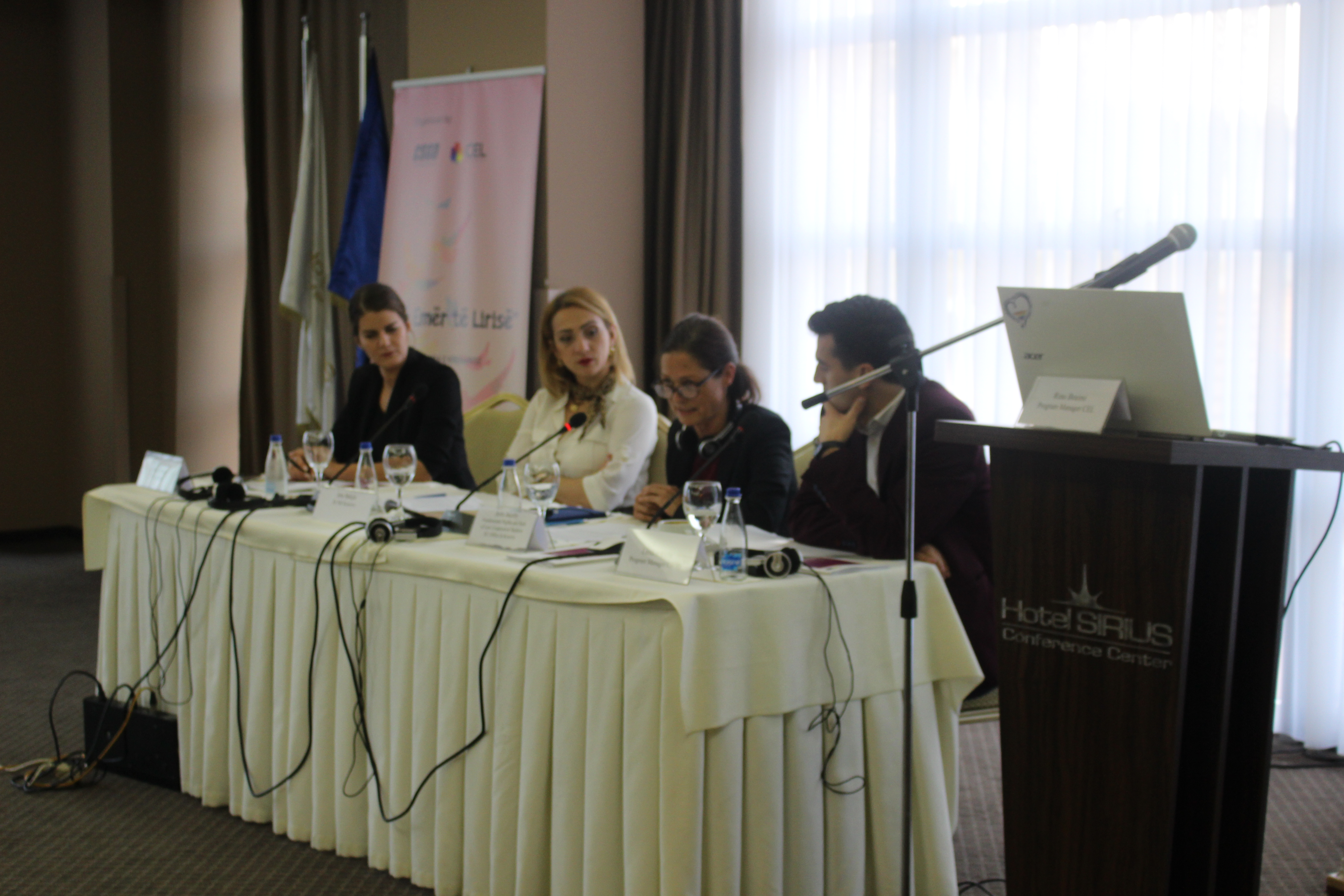
Kosovo Pride Week 2018

An LGBTQ rights group, the Center for Social Emancipation, describes gay life in Kosovo as being "underground" and mostly secretive. Kosovo has one gay bar, in Pristina.

According to a 2015 survey conducted by the National Democratic Institute, 81% of LGBTQ+ Kosovars said they had been subject to psychological abuse, and 29% reported being victim of physical violence. A study of the U.S.-based National Democratic Institute found that Kosovo was amongst the most homophobic in the Balkans, with over 97% not willing to accept their child if they came out as lesbian or gay.

Events celebrating the International Day Against Homophobia, Transphobia and Biphobia have been organized in Kosovo since 2007. The first pride parade occurred in Pristina in May 2016, with attendance from President Hashim Thaçi and British and American diplomats. The annual Pride Week has been held in Pristina since 2017. In 2018, Mayor Shpend Ahmeti participated. During the event's third edition in October 2019, participants started at the Skanderbeg Square, making their way down Mother Teresa Boulevard to Zahir Pajaziti Square, passing the government and parliament buildings and other landmarks of the city, with the slogan "Whoever your heart beats for" (Për kon t'rreh zemra). The events have been held without incidence, and consist of various artistic exhibitions, parties, conferences, discussions and a parade. The event has been under threat multiple times, especially in 2017, where anonymous threats warned people to not attend the event.

=== LGBTQ rights movement in Kosovo ===
There are currently several local LGBTQ rights organisations in Kosovo. Among the most notable are the Center for Equality and Liberty (CEL; Albanian: Qendra për Barazi dhe Liri), the Center for Social Group Development (CSGD; Albanian: Qendra për Zhvillimin e Grupeve Shoqërore), and the Center for Social Emancipation (QESh; Albanian: Qendra për Emancipim Shoqëror).

== Summary table ==
Same-sex sexual activity legal	Yes (Since 1994)
Equal age of consent (16)	Yes (Since 2004)
Anti-discrimination laws in employment	Yes (Since 2004)
Anti-discrimination laws in the provision of goods and services	Yes (Since 2004)
Anti-discrimination laws in all other areas (incl. indirect discrimination, hate speech)	Yes (Since 2004)
Anti-discrimination laws covering gender identity in all areas	Yes (Since 2015)
Same-sex marriage	No
Recognition of same-sex couples	No (Proposed)
Stepchild adoption by same-sex couples	No
Joint adoption by same-sex couples	No
Conversion therapy banned	No
Gay, lesbian and bisexual people allowed to serve openly in the military	Yes
Access to IVF for lesbian couples	No
Right to change legal gender	No
Commercial surrogacy for gay male couples	No (Banned regardless of sexual orientation)
MSMs allowed to donate blood	No

== See also ==
- LGBTQ rights in Serbia
- Politics of Kosovo
- LGBTQ rights in Europe
- Age of consent in Europe
