= 2025–2026 Kosovo political deadlock =

Failure to elect the Speaker and the Cabinet

On 9 February 2025, Kosovo held parliamentary elections to choose the 120 members of its Assembly. The largest party in parliament after the election was Vetëvendosje (LVV), who won 42.3% of the vote and was granted 48 seats, 13 short of a parliamentary majority. The largest party is required by law to appoint the new Speaker of the Assembly within 30 days after the results are certified, needing to pass the threshold of 61 votes (an absolute majority).

== Deadlocks ==
=== February 2025 parliament ===
==== Speaker deadlock ====
LVV's proposition for Assembly Speaker is the outgoing Minister of Justice, Albulena Haxhiu. The voting process began on 15 April 2025, and was defeated by a vote of 52–48, with 11 abstentions. The meeting was delayed by 48 hours as per Kosovo's legal framework, and the members reconvened again on 19 April. The members did not reach a consensus once more. The meeting was delayed more than 40 times as a result of the opposition parties categorically refusing the proposed candidate, which has been called a "deadlock" or "blockade" by all parties. On 26 August, Dimal Basha from LVV was voted as Assembly Speaker on his second proposal with a majority vote of 73 to 30.

All parties have accused each other of trying to block the process, and have refused several options, such as the option for a secret ballot which was proposed by lawmakers. Haxhiu has said that if a secret ballot goes ahead and she does not receive the required 61 votes, she would withdraw. Neither opposition party has proposed its own candidate for Assembly Speaker. The Assembly has also not approved a budget for 2026, increasing tensions.

On 26 June, the Constitutional Court ruled that the deadlock must be ended within 30 days (by 26 July). Following the court's decision, President Vjosa Osmani began to meet with party leaders to find an agreement.

The deadlock has been met with symbolic civil protests. In one protest on 3 July, the lawyer Arianit Koci gained a lot of media attention after he brought four donkeys in front of the doors of the Assembly, to symbolize "the stubbornness that the Assembly members are showing". By 27 July, there were 54 votes in total before the deadline set by the Constitutional Court.

On 8 August, the Court gave MPs another 30 days to elect a speaker. It however stipulated that no candidate could be proposed more than three times, and that MPs must be present to vote during the sessions. The Court also found that the acting speaker had violated the constitution by continuing to call for a commission to establish a secret ballot.

No.	Candidate	Party	Pro	Against	Abstention	Date
1	Albulena Haxhiu	VV	57	56	3	20 August
2	Donika Gërvalla	Guxo	57	56	3	20 August
3	Hekuran Murati	VV	57	51	6	22 August
4	Hekuran Murati	VV	55	46	5	24 August
5	Arbërie Nagavci	VV	55	47	4	24 August
6	Dimal Basha	VV	57	25	24	24 August
7	Dimal Basha	VV	73	30	8	26 August

==== Serb deputy speaker deadlock ====
From 26 August to 10 October 2025, Kosovo entered another institutional crisis, this time related to the election of the Serbian Deputy Speaker of the Assembly. Slavko Simić was initially proposed as the Serb deputy speaker by the Serb List on 26 August 2025, but the nomination was rejected three times. Basha did not allow Simić to be proposed a fourth time, interpreting that the Constitutional Court ruling that stated a candidate can only be nominated three times for speakership also extended to the procedure to elect deputy speakers. After the Serb List refused to nominate another candidate, Basha began drawing lots among the Serb List MPs, and three candidates called from the lots were rejected.

The deadlock was temporarily resolved after ZSPO MP Nenad Rašić was elected in the position on 10 October, and the Assembly was declared constituted. Basha stated that the procedure was correct, as all nine MPs from the Serb List had been proposed and exhausted. Basha also explained that Kosovo's constitution specified the candidate must be a member of the Serb community but did not have to be from a particular political party. The election of Rašić to the position resulted in the Serb List filing a complaint to the Constitutional Court.

The Constitutional Court later declared Rašić's election as Serb deputy speaker unconstitutional on 28 January 2026, finding that Rašić hadn't been proposed by a majority of the Serb community, while also noting that the Serb List played a blocking role in the constitution of the Assembly. Basha stated that the ruling by the Constitutional Court was "unfounded", stating that Rašić was elected only after the majority of Serbian community MPs failed to propose an alternative candidate. The full ruling was later released on 4 February 2026.

The ruling of procedures relating to the election of the Serb deputy speaker would later be applied after the Assembly met following the December 2025 elections and elected Albulena Haxhiu as Assembly Speaker on 11 February 2026. The election of the deputy speakers was conducted as a single package, with Ardian Gola becoming Vetëvendosje's deputy speaker, Vlora Çitaku becoming PDK's deputy speaker, Kujtim Shala becoming LDK's deputy speaker, Emilija Rexhepi becoming the minorities' deputy speaker, and Slavko Simić becoming the Serb deputy speaker.

==== Cabinet deadlock ====
On 26 October 2025, LVV nominated Albin Kurti as prime minister-designate and presented a proposed cabinet; however, it failed to secure the required 61 votes, receiving only 56 in favor, while 52 deputies voted against and 4 abstained. According to the Constitution of Kosovo, if the proposed composition of the new government does not obtain the necessary majority in the Assembly, the president must appoint a second prime minister-designate. Accordingly, on 19 November 2025, LVV nominated Glauk Konjufca as prime minister-designate and presented a proposed cabinet, but again failed to obtain the required 61 votes, receiving 56 votes in favor, 53 against, and 4 abstentions.

A yellow background indicates the nominee who became part of the cabinet formed in February 2026.

Portfolio	26 October nominee	19 November nominee	Party
Prime Minister	Albin Kurti	Glauk Konjufca	LVV
First Deputy Prime Minister and Minister of Foreign Affairs (Note: In the second nomination, the "Diaspora" portfolio was also added.)	Glauk Konjufca	Albin Kurti	LVV
Second Deputy Prime Minister and Minister of Justice	Donika Gërvalla		Guxo
Third Deputy Prime Minister for Minority Affairs (Note: In the second nomination, the "Economic Cooperation" portfolio was also added.)	Fikrim Damka		KDTP
Minister of Agriculture (Note: In the second nomination, the "Forestry and Rural Development" portfolio was also added.)	Armend Muja		LVV
Minister for Communities and Returns	Nenad Rašić		ZSPO
Minister of Culture (Note: In the second nomination, the "Tourism" portfolio was also added.)	Fatmir Spahiu		Independent
Minister of Defence	Ejup Maqedonci		LVV
Minister of Education	Avni Zogiani		LVV
Minister of Energy (Note: In the second nomination, the "Mining" portfolio was also added.)	Artane Rizvanolli		LVV
Minister of Environment and Spatial Planning	Fitore Pacolli		LVV
Minister for Family and Social Welfare	Andin Hoti		LVV
Minister of Finance (Note: In the second nomination, the "Economy" portfolio was also added.)	Hekuran Murati		LVV
Minister of Health	Arben Vitia		LVV
Minister of Infrastructure (Note: In the second nomination, the "Transport" portfolio was also added.)	Dimal Basha	Besnik Bislimi	LVV
Minister of Internal Affairs	Xhelal Sveçla		LVV
Minister of Local Government Administration	Rasim Demiri		Vakat
Minister of Public Administration and Digitalisation	Lulëzon Jagxhiu		LVV
Minister for Regional Development	Sejnur Veshall		PREBK
Minister of Sport (Note: In the second nomination, the "Youth" portfolio was also added.)	Blerim Gashani		LVV
Minister of Trade (Note: In the second nomination, the "Industry and European Integration" portfolio was also added.)	Mimoza Kusari-Lila		Alternativa

=== December 2025 parliament ===
A fresh election was held on 28 December in which Vetëvendosje won nearly a majority in parliament, effectively ending the deadlock as Albulena Haxhiu was voted as the next Assembly Speaker by a majority of 66 lawmakers on 11 February 2026. Later that day, Albin Kurti's third cabinet was approved, including nine nominees from the previous failed attempts.

==== Presidential election deadlock ====
Under Article 86 of the Constitution of Kosovo, the Assembly must elect a president no later than 30 days before the end of the incumbent's term. The 2026 election is the sixth presidential election held in Kosovo since independence in 2008. An initial attempt on 5 March 2026 failed because of a lack of quorum, triggering the 60-day constitutional period for electing a president. On 6 March, President Vjosa Osmani dissolved the Assembly and moved toward snap parliamentary elections, but the decree was challenged by Vetëvendosje. On 9 March, the Constitutional Court suspended the decree pending review. On 25 March, the Court ruled that the dissolution decree had no legal effect and gave the Assembly 34 more days, until 28 April, to elect a president. After Osmani's term expired on 4 April, Speaker of the Assembly Albulena Haxhiu became acting president until a new president is elected, for up to six months.

A second attempt to elect the president is scheduled for 27 April 2026. However, the three main opposition parties—the Democratic Party of Kosovo (PDK), Democratic League of Kosovo (LDK), and Alliance for the Future of Kosovo (AAK)—announced they would boycott the session, labeling the proceedings a "propaganda show" and "not serious".

On 28 April 2026, after the Assembly failed to elect a president within the deadline set by the Constitutional Court, it was dissolved in accordance with the Court's ruling. Acting president Albulena Haxhiu subsequently called snap parlimentary elections, which were scheduled for 7 June 2026.

First round (1st attempt) (5 March)				First round (2nd attempt) (27 April)				
Candidate	Party	Votes	%	Candidate	Party	Votes	%	Result
Glauk Konjufca	Vetëvendosje	No quorum		Feride Rushiti	Independent	63	98.44	No quorum
Fatmire Mullhaxha Kollçaku	Vetëvendosje	No quorum		Hatixhe Hoxha	Vetëvendosje	0	0.00	No quorum
Invalid/blank votes		—		Invalid/blank votes		1	1.56	No quorum
Total ballots cast		66		Total ballots cast		64	100%	—
Registered voters/turnout		120	55.0%	Registered voters/turnout		120	53.3%	

=== 2026 election ===
On 13 September 2026, the Assembly of Kosovo approved a new government led by Albin Kurti, following the June 2026 parliamentary election. Kurti's government received 62 votes in the 120-seat Assembly, while opposition parties boycotted the vote and challenged the legality of the proceedings.

The formation of the government ended one part of the institutional deadlock, but the broader political crisis remained unresolved because the Assembly had still not elected a president. The failure to reach the required two-thirds majority raised the possibility of another snap parliamentary election if the presidential deadlock could not be resolved. Kosovo's Constitutional Court set 6 October 2026 as the final deadline to elect a president, extrapolated from the initial date of 8 August when the 30-day period to elect a speaker was triggered.

The decision was compounded by mounting pressure from opposition parties like PDK and LDK, to decide on amendments upon the Law on the Kosovo Specialist Chambers, following the conviction of several former key KLA people in late September 2026. Kurti pushed to prioritize the presidential pick and reportedly discussed with the opposition parties to postpone the Specialist Chambers hearing. Frustrated citizens conducted protests to exert pressure on the Assembly to conduct this vote on the fate of the Specialist Chambers. The protests turned violent on 5 October, one day before the deadline, when protesters and the Kosovo Police clashed at the Mother Theresa Square, near the Assembly. The Kosovo Police attempted to disperse protesters, who were aiming fireworks at the Assembly building.

Justina Shiroka Pula during her inauguration as President of Kosovo

Protests continued on 6 October, and the Assembly held a late-night meeting and attempted to conduct both the amendments on the Law on the Specialist Chambers, and the vote for a president, in that particular order. The candidates were PDK member Eliza Hoxha, proposed by PDK leader Bedri Hamza, and Justina Shiroka Pula, a former PDK member turned independent proposed by Albin Kurti. Kurti announced Shiroka Pula on short notice via a press conference less than an hour before the midnight deadline. In a last-minute vote with 81 votes in favor, the Assembly picked Shiroka Pula as the 7th President of Kosovo. Since she was sworn in on 7 October, 13 minutes after midnight, her election became subject to legal interpretation as to whether or not the decision can be validated by the Constitutional Court.

== See also ==
- February 2025 Kosovan parliamentary election
- December 2025 Kosovan parliamentary election
- 2026 Kosovan parliamentary election
- 2026 Kosovan presidential election
