= Aliu =

Aliu is a given name and a surname. People with this name include:

== People ==
=== Given name ===
- Aliu Djaló (born 1992), Portuguese football midfielder
- Aliu Mahama (1946 – 16 November 2012), Ghanaian politician
- Aliu Babatunde Fafunwa (1923–2010), known as "Babs", the first Nigerian professor of education

=== Surname ===
- Akim Aliu (born 1989), Canadian ice hockey player
- Ali Aliu (1924–2010), Kosovo Albanian writer, economist, teacher, and politician
- Arbër Aliu (1988–2019), Albanian footballer
- B. Bix Aliu, American diplomat
- Dardan Aliu (born 1993), known professionally as Regard, Kosovo-Albanian DJ and producer
- Deji Aliu (born 1975), Nigerian sprinter
- David Aliu (born 1981), retired British basketball player
- Farouk Aliu Mahama (born 1981), Ghanaian politician
- Gramoz Aliu (born 1995), known professionally as Mozzik, Kosovo-Albanian rapper and singer
- Izer Aliu (director) (born 1982), Norwegian filmmaker
- Izer Aliu (footballer) (born 1999), Swiss footballer
- Jimoh Aliu (born 1939), Nigerian dramatist, sculptor, writer, and director
- Liburn Aliu (1975), Kosovo-Albanian politician
- Likou Aliu (born 1962), Samoan boxer
- Mujaid Sadick Aliu (born 2000), known as Mujaid, Spanish professional footballer
- Mujdin Aliu (1974–1999), Macedonian Albanian soldier
- Olumuyiwa Benard Aliu (born 1960), fifth and president of the Council of the International Civil Aviation Organization
- Salamat Ahuoiza Aliu, Nigerian neurosurgeon

== See also ==
- Alieu Badara Njie (1904–1982), Gambian statesman
- Bajram Aliu Stadium, Kosovo
- Ferki Aliu Stadium, Kosovo
- Hadji Alia, or Haxhi Aliu Ulqinaku, (1569–1625), Albanian pirate lord originating from Calabria
