= Atifete Jahjaga Cabinet =

Team of the President of Kosovo, Atifete Jahjaga

4th President of Kosovo
- Incumbent
- Assumed office 7 April 2011
- Prime Minister: Hashim Thaçi; Isa Mustafa
- Preceded by: Jakup Krasniqi (Acting)

Personal details
- Born: 20 April 1975 (age 51) Gjakova, Kosovo, SFR Yugoslavia
- Party: Independent
- Spouse: Astrit Kuçi
- Education: University of Pristina; University of Leicester

Atifete Jahjaga was the President of Kosovo 2011–2016.

== Office of the President of Kosovo ==
During President Jahjaga's mandate, the Office of the President of the Republic of Kosovo has always ranked as the most trusted institution by the citizens of Kosovo. As the first consensual and non-partisan President in history of independent Kosovo, Jahjaga was focused on de-politicization of the Office of the President which is open to all citizens and political parties. She has redefined the role of the President in building pluralistic and democratic life of Kosovo, and continuously implemented the constitutional principles that form the basis of democracy.

President Jahjaga and her Cabinet have been singled out by Kosovo's Anti-Corruption Agency as the best example of transparency and accountability that public officials should demonstrate. Jahjaga's Cabinet consists of non-partisan and experienced professionals, many of them educated at prestigious U.S. and European universities.

== Cabinet of Advisers ==
=== Adrian Prenkaj ===
Adviser on European Integration | Main Article: Adrian Prenkaj

Adrian Prenkaj served as Adviser for European Integration to President Jahjaga, a position he assumed in 2012. He served as President's representative in the Kosovo's Negotiating Team for the Stabilization and Association Agreement with the European Union, and was involved in implementation of the EU Visa Liberalization Roadmap for Kosovo. He also coordinated the work of the National Council for European Integration, established and led by President Jahjaga.

In February 2015, he was appointed by the President to coordinate the efforts of national institutions to improve policy performance on indicators to make Kosovo eligible for the US Government's Millennium Challenge Corporation (MCC) development funds. On 6 November 2015, MCC announced that Kosovo has passed the scorecard with 13 out of 20 indicators. At its quarterly meeting on 16 December 2015, the Millennium Challenge Corporation Board of Directors voted to make Kosovo eligible for a compact program, MCC's large-scale investment program.

He currently works as public policy consultant for international projects in Kosovo.

=== Garentina Kraja ===
Political Adviser | Main Article: Garentina Kraja

Garentina Kraja served as Speechwriter to President Atifete Jahjaga. Kraja advised the President on a large portfolio of foreign policy and national security issues, including countering violent extremism, as well as domestic politics. As the President's representative, Kraja took part in the Strategic Security Sector Review that includes the creation of Kosovo's Armed Forces.

Garentina holds a BA and MA degree in Political Science from Yale University. Her thesis on the recruitment practices of guerrilla movements won her Yale University's prize for best comparative essay in 2011. Prior to her enrollment in university, Kraja attended the prestigious four-month leadership Yale World Fellows program, selected from over 600 candidates worldwide in 2006. She was part of the first generation of independent journalists at Kosovar daily Koha Ditore. During 1997 and 1999 she covered and reported widely on the Kosovo war. From 2001–2007 Kraja was The Associated Press correspondent in Kosovo.

She currently teaches at American University in Kosovo.

=== Selim Selimi ===
Legal Adviser

Selim Selimi was appointed legal adviser to President Jahjaga in 2012. He advised the President on a range of legal, constitutional and rule of law matters. Selimi also coordinated the work of the National Anti-Corruption Council, established and led by President Jahjaga.

Before joining President Jahjaga's team, Selimi has worked for OSCE, UNDP and U.S. Department of Justice - ICITAP covering mainly rule of law and parliamentary affairs. Selim Selimi holds a law degree from the University of Prishtina. He has a master's degree in management of development from ICT-ILO and University of Turin in Italy and a master's degree in international development policy from Sanford School of Public Policy at Duke University in the United States.

Selim Selimi served as Minister of Justice of the Republic of Kosovo from 3 June 2020 to 22 March 2021.

=== Jeta Krasniqi ===
Adviser on Gender Equality

Jeta Krasniqi serves as Adviser on Gender Equality. She coordinates the work of the National Council for Survivors of Sexual Violence During the War, established and led by President Jahjaga. Jeta Krasniqi graduated with a BA from Eastern Mediterranean University in Cyprus, and has a master's degree from Johns Hopkins University SAIS at the Bologna Center.

She is currently involved in non-profit sector.

== Previous Appointments ==
=== Ilir Deda ===
Ilir Deda served as Chief of Staff to President Jahjaga in the period from April 2011 to January 2012. He is currently member of the Kosovo Parliament.

=== Qendrim Gashi ===
Qendrim Gashi served as Foreign Policy Adviser to President Jahjaga from April to October 2011. He currently serves as Ambassador of Kosovo to France.

=== Ariana Qosaj-Mustafa ===
Ariana served as President's Legal Adviser from 2011 to 2013. She is currently a Senior researcher at Kosovar Institute for Policy Research and Development – KIPRED.

=== Ilir Salihu ===
Ilir Salihu has been Deputy Auditor General of Republic of Kosovo since April 2017.He graduated from the Faculty of Economy, University of Prishtina, while he obtained the title Master of Business Administration (Strategic Management) from the prestigious management school in Slovenia – IEDC Bled School of Management. He has attended other academic programs in Industry Management at University for Management and Economy in Växjö, Sweden, and Entrepreneurship Program at American University in Bulgaria, Blagoevgrad. Salihu's career is rich with managerial positions. Before the war of 1999 he was involved in the people's movement for freedom and independence of Kosovo. Belonging to the youth leaders during 1992-99 he contributed to establishment of independent institutions of Kosovo, in particular to organisation of independent education system and youth's life. After the war, Salihu started his professional career at the Department of Trade and Industry as officer for Socially Owned Enterprises management and development supervision. Upon establishment of Kosovo Trust Agency (KTA), Salihu was initially engaged as privatisation officer, then he moved to KTA’s Department for Publicly Owned Enterprises. In 2005, he was appointed Director of Department and at the same time KTA Deputy Director for Publicly Owned Enterprises. During 2005-2008 Salihu chaired the Board of Directors for Post and Telecommunication of Kosovo (PTK) and for Prishtina International Airport. During that period both enterprises went through a multidimensional transformation. From July 2008, Salihu was part of important national and international institutions as Chief of Staff and Adviser for Economy to the President of the Republic of Kosovo (2011-2013), Advisor to Minister of Trade and Industry (2014-2016), Advisor for Economy at International Civilian Office (ICO, 2008-2011).Salihu’s academic life was full of engagements since 2011 lecturing the Human Resources Management, Strategic Management, Organisational Behaviour and Leadership and Consumer Behaviour. Other than that, Salihu has also provided consultancy services to different international organisations and local businesses.
