= Haxhiu =

Haxhiu is an Albanian surname. Notable people with the surname include:

- Ahmet Haxhiu (1932–1994), Kosovo Albanian political activist
- Albulena Haxhiu (born 1987), Kosovo Albanian politician
- Baton Haxhiu (born 1968), Albanian journalist from Kosovo
- Fatmir Haxhiu (1927–2001), Albanian painter
- Gerd Haxhiu (born 1972), Albanian football coach
- Mexhit Haxhiu (born 1943), Albanian football player
- Rimal Haxhiu (born 1999), Albanian footballer

== See also ==
- Abdurrahman Roza Haxhiu Stadium in Lushnjë, Albania
