= Politics of Kosovo =

Politics of Kosovo Politika e Kosovës
- Seal of the Government of Kosovo
- Polity type: Unitary parliamentary constitutional republic
- Constitution: Constitution of Kosovo

Legislative branch
- Name: Assembly
- Type: Unicameral
- Meeting place: Assembly Building
- Presiding officer: Albulena Haxhiu, Chairman

Executive branch
- Head of state
- Title: President
- Currently: Justina Shiroka Pula
- Appointer: Assembly
- Head of government
- Title: Prime Minister
- Currently: Albin Kurti
- Appointer: Direct popular vote
- Cabinet
- Name: Cabinet of Kosovo
- Current cabinet: Fourth cabinet of Albin Kurti
- Leader: Prime Minister
- Deputy leader: Deputy Prime Ministers
- Appointer: Prime Minister
- Headquarters: Government Building
- Ministries: 20

Judicial branch
- Name: Judicial system
- Constitutional Court
- Chief judge: Nexhmi Rexhepi
- Supreme Court
- Chief judge: Fejzullah Rexhepi
- The Court of Appeals
- Chief judge: Valon Totaj

The politics of Kosovo takes place in a framework of a multi-party parliamentary representative democratic republic, whereby the president (Presidenti) is the head of state and the prime minister (Kryeministri) the head of government. Parliamentary elections are held every four years, the most recent in 2026.

The executive power is exercised by the government (Qeveria), presided over by the prime minister. Legislative power is vested in both the executive and the parliament (Kuvendi). The judiciary is independent of the executive and the legislature.

== Government ==
=== Executive ===
The Executive of Kosovo is the collection of Kosovo institutions that exercises executive authority in Kosovo. It is headed by the prime minister of Kosovo, and also includes the prime minister, the deputy prime ministers, and various ministers. The president of Kosovo also plays a role.

Albin Kurti is the prime minister of Kosovo and head of government. Vjosa Osmani is the acting president of Kosovo and head of state. The ruling parties are Vetëvendosje (LVV), Democratic League of Kosovo (LDK) and Democratic Party of Kosovo (PDK).

=== Legislative ===
The Assembly of Kosovo (Kuvendi i Kosovës) has 120 members elected for a four-year term. According to the Constitution, Kosovo shall have an Assembly consisting of 120 members. It includes twenty reserved seats which are ten for Kosovar Serbs and ten for non-Serb minorities (e.g., Bosniak, Roma, etc.). Kosovo has a multi-party system, with numerous parties in which no one party often has a chance of gaining power alone, and parties must work with each other to form coalition governments.

The Assembly passes all laws in Kosovo, ratifies international treaties, appoints the president, prime minister, ministers, and justices of all courts, adopts the budget and performs other duties as established by the Constitution. The Parliament can pass a vote of no-confidence on the Government by a majority of the members.

== Autonomy and independence ==
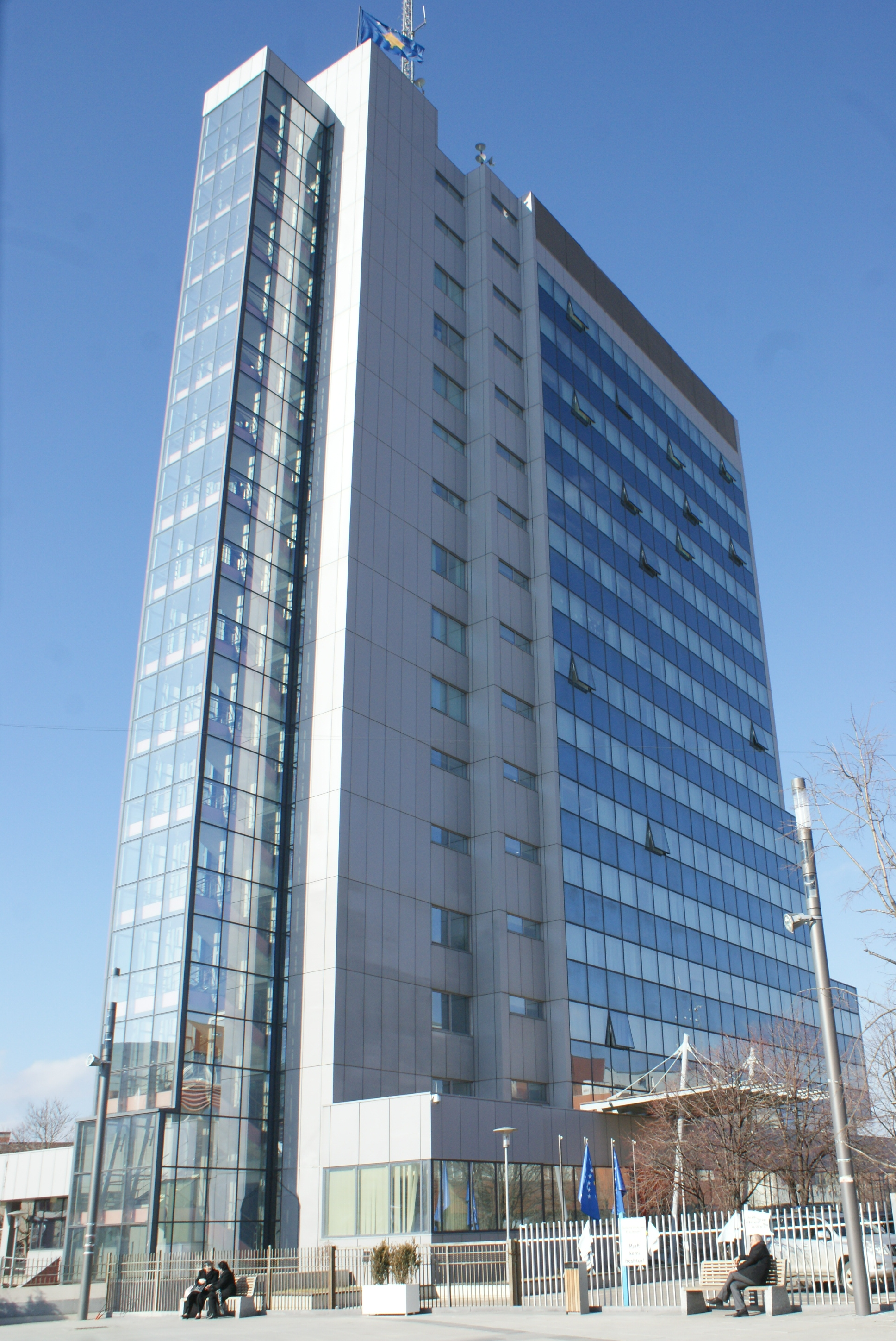
Government Building of Kosovo in Pristina.

The Socialist Autonomous Province of Kosovo was established in 1945 as an autonomous entity within the People's Republic of Serbia. Under the 1974 constitution, Kosovo obtained extensive autonomy, and became one of the subjects of the Yugoslav federation.

On 5 July 1989 this extensive autonomy was largely revoked by Slobodan Milošević's administration and the amount of autonomy of Kosovo had been restored to its pre-1974 status. On 28 September 1990, the name of the province was reverted to Autonomous Province of Kosovo and Metohija.

In 1990, Kosovo was declared independent by the ethnic Albanian politicians and was recognised by Albania. The name of the entity was Republic of Kosova. A period of fighting ensued between Kosovan Albanians and Yugoslav security forces resulting in a humanitarian crisis. In 1999, the United Nations placed Kosovo under their administration in the aftermath of the War in Kosovo. Under the United Nations Security Council Resolution 1244 (UNSCR 1244), the United Nations Interim Administration Mission in Kosovo (UNMIK) was established on 10 June 1999, which maintained how the Province of Kosovo functioned. UNSCR 1244 called for a political process to determine the future status of Kosovo; UN-sponsored negotiations began in 2006.

UNSCR 1244 placed Kosovo under transitional UN administration pending a determination of Kosovo's future status. This Resolution entrusted UNMIK with sweeping powers to govern Kosovo, but also directed UNMIK to establish interim institutions of self-governance. Resolution 1244 gave Yugoslavia no role in governing Kosovo and from 1999, national laws and institutions were not valid in Kosovo. The resolution recognised Yugoslav sovereignty of Kosovo. NATO has a separate mandate to provide for a safe and secure environment.

In May 2001, UNMIK promulgated the Constitutional Framework, which established Kosovo's Provisional Institutions of Self-Government (PISG). After 2001, UNMIK gradually transferred increased governing competencies to the PISG, while reserving some powers such as foreign affairs. Kosovo also established municipal governments and an internationally supervised Kosovo Police Service.

The largest political party in Kosovo, the Democratic League of Kosovo (LDK), has its origins in the 1990s non-violent resistance movement against Milošević's rule. The party was led by Ibrahim Rugova until his death in 2006. The two next largest parties have their roots in the Kosovo Liberation Army (KLA): the Democratic Party of Kosovo (PDK) led by former KLA leader Hashim Thaçi and the Alliance for the Future of Kosovo (AAK) led by former KLA commander Ramush Haradinaj. Kosovo publisher Veton Surroi formed his own political party in 2004 named "Ora." Kosovo Serbs formed the Serbian List for Kosovo and Metohija (SLKM) in 2004, but have boycotted Kosovo's institutions and never taken seats in the Kosovo Assembly.

In November 2001, the Organization for Security and Co-operation in Europe supervised the first elections for the Kosovo Assembly. After that election, Kosovo's political parties formed an all-party unity coalition and elected Ibrahim Rugova as President and Bajram Rexhepi (PDK) as prime minister.

After Kosovo-wide elections in October 2004, the LDK and AAK formed a new governing coalition that did not include PDK and Ora. This coalition agreement resulted in Ramush Haradinaj (AAK) becoming prime minister, while Ibrahim Rugova retained the position of President. PDK and Ora were critical of the coalition agreement and have since frequently accused the current government of corruption.

Ramush Haradinaj resigned the post of prime minister after he was indicted for war crimes by the International Criminal Tribunal for the former Yugoslavia (ICTY) in March 2005. He was replaced by Bajram Kosumi (AAK). But in a political shake-up after the death of President Rugova in January 2006, Kosumi himself was replaced by former Kosovo Protection Corps commander Agim Çeku. Çeku won recognition for his outreach to minorities, but Serbia was critical of his wartime past as military leader of the KLA and claimed he was not doing enough for Kosovo Serbs. A Serbian court had indicted Çeku for war crimes he committed in Kosovo. The Kosovo Assembly elected Fatmir Sejdiu, a former LDK parliamentarian, president after Rugova's death. Slaviša Petković, Minister for Communities and Returns, was previously the only ethnic Serb in the government, but resigned in November 2006 amid allegations of corruption at his ministry.

On 10 February 2007, nearly 3,000 people protested against the plan by United Nations chief negotiator Martti Ahtisaari which would in effect grant independence to the Kosovo province. Some militant ethnic Albanian groups, like Vetevendosje (Self-determination) that led the Saturday ethnic Albanian protests in Pristina, opposed UN sponsored talks and wanted the Kosovo parliament to declare independence immediately. On Tuesday 13 February 2007, Kosovo interior minister Fatmir Rexhepi resigned on moral grounds after two people died of injuries suffered in clashes with police during the protest. There was no involvement of Kosovo police in the protests, as the clashes were with the UNMIK police. Rexhepi remains as the only politician in Kosovo to have resigned on moral grounds.

Elections were held in Kosovo on 17 November 2007. After early results on the morning of the 18th indicating opposition leader Hashim Thaçi was on course to gain 35 per cent of the vote, he claimed victory for PDK, the Albanian Democratic Party, and stated his intention to declare independence. President Fatmir Sejdiu's Democratic League was in second place with 22 percent of the vote. The turnout at the election was particularly low with most Serbs refusing to vote.

On 25 December 2007 it was announced Thaçi's Democratic Party of Kosovo would form a coalition with President Fatmir Sejdiu's Democratic League forming a slight majority of 62 seats out of 120. Thaçi's government will include 7 ministers from his party, 5 ministers from LDK and 3 ministers from non-Albanian communities.

Following years of failed negotiations on the status of Kosovo in Serbia, Prime Minister of Kosovo Hashim Thaçi announced on 16 February 2008 that the Assembly of Kosovo would declare independence the following day, 17 February 2008 at 17:00h. The independent Republic of Kosovo has since been recognised by more than 110 countries.

== See also ==
- History of Kosovo
- President of Kosovo
- Prime Minister of Kosovo
- Albanian nationalism
- Human rights in Kosovo
- Ministry of Foreign Affairs (Kosovo)
- Foreign relations of Kosovo
- Accession of Kosovo to the European Union
