= Ministry of Culture and Tourism (Kosovo) =

Government ministry in Pristina, Kosovo

- Albanian: Ministria e Kulturës dhe Turizmit; Serbian: Ministarstvo Kulture i Turizma
- Headquarters of the Ministry of Culture and Tourism

Ministry overview
- Type: Government ministry
- Jurisdiction: Government of Kosovo
- Headquarters: Pristina, Kosovo; 42.66154°N 21.16266°E
- Minister responsible: Saranda Bogujevci, Minister of Culture and Turism
- Deputy minister responsible: Nora Arapi-Krasniqi, Deputy Minister of Culture and Tourism
- Parent department: Government of Kosovo
- Website: www.mkrs-ks.org

The Ministry of Culture and Tourism (Albanian: Ministria e Kulturës dhe Turizmit; Serbian: Ministarstvo Kulture i Turizma) is a ministry for the Government of Kosovo responsible for government policy and administration in the fields of culture and tourism.

The ministry is responsible for cultural policy, the protection and preservation of cultural heritage, cultural institutions, the creative and cultural sectors and the development and promotion of tourism. Its minister is Saranda Bogujevci.

== History ==
The ministry succeeded the cultural responsibilities of the Ministry of Culture, Youth and Sport following the formation of the new government in February 2026.

On February 13, 2026, a handover ceremony was held at the Ministry of Culture, Youth and Sport. Minister Hajrulla Çeku transferred the responsibilities of the former ministry to Saranda Bogujevci, Minister of Culture and Tourism, and Blerim Gashani, Minister of Sport and Youth.

The reorganization separated the former ministry's culture and tourism responsibilities from its sport and youth responsibilities. The Ministry of Culture and Tourism assumed responsibility for culture and tourism, while the Ministry of Sport and Youth assumed responsibility for sport and youth.

== Responsibilities ==
The ministry is responsible for the development and implementation of government policies in the fields of culture and tourism.

Its cultural responsibilities include the protection, preservation and promotion of cultural heritage, support for cultural institutions and programs, and cooperation with artists, cultural organizations and international partners.

The ministry's tourism responsibilities include the development and promotion of tourism in Kosovo and cooperation with domestic and international institutions and organizations involved in tourism.

The ministry also works on cultural diplomacy, international cultural cooperation, the creative industries and the promotion of Kosovo's cultural values abroad.

== Cultural heritage ==
The ministry is responsible for government policy concerning the protection, preservation and promotion of cultural heritage in Kosovo.

The legal framework for cultural heritage includes the Law No. 02/L-88 on Cultural Heritage, adopted by the Assembly of Kosovo and published in the Official Gazette of the Republic of Kosovo on 1 July 2008.

The law provides the legal framework for the protection of cultural heritage in Kosovo. The ministry has subsequently issued regulations and administrative instructions concerning the inventory, selection, conservation, restoration and protection of cultural heritage.

Regulation No. 11/2022 concerns the inventory and process of selection of cultural heritage for protection.

The ministry also administers legislation concerning the protection zones of cultural heritage assets and conservation and development policies. Regulation No. 04/2024 concerns the perimeter and protective zone of cultural heritage assets and conservation and development policy.

The ministry also publishes and administers lists of protected cultural heritage. The Official Gazette records a List of Cultural Heritage for Permanent Protection under the Ministry of Culture and Tourism.

== Cultural institutions ==
The ministry is responsible for government policy and administration relating to national cultural institutions.

Among the institutions within the cultural sector are the National Museum of Kosovo, the National Library of Kosovo, the National Theatre of Kosovo, the National Gallery of Kosovo and the Kosovo Philharmonic.

The ministry also oversees policies relating to cultural institutions and their governance. A 2026 regulation issued by the ministry establishes procedures and criteria for the selection of directors of art and culture institutions.

== Tourism ==
Tourism became part of the ministry's portfolio following the 2026 reorganization.

The ministry promotes cooperation in tourism and cultural heritage and develops initiatives intended to promote Kosovo's cultural values and tourism destinations. In 2026, the ministry discussed cooperation with foreign governments and international organizations on cultural heritage, tourism and cultural projects.

The ministry has also worked with international partners on sustainable tourism and the development of initiatives connecting cultural heritage with tourism.

== List of Ministers ==
Portrait	Minister	Term of office			Cabinet	Party
Portrait	Minister	From	To	Period	Cabinet	Party
1	Saranda Bogujevci	13 February 2026	Incumbent	224 days	Kurti III; Kurti IV	LVV

== See also ==
- Government of Kosovo
- Cultural heritage of Kosovo
- Monuments of Kosovo
- Third cabinet of Albin Kurti
