= Fitore Pacolli =

Kosovar politician and academic (born 1982)

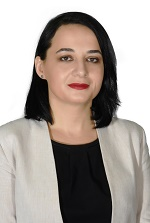
- Official portrait of Fitore Pacolli

Minister of Environment and Spatial Planning of Kosovo
- Incumbent
- Assumed office 11 February 2026
- Prime Minister: Albin Kurti
- Deputy: Avni Zogiani (First); Driton Hyseni (Second)
- Preceded by: Liburn Aliu

Member of the Assembly of Kosovo
- In office 2017 – 11 February 2026

Personal details
- Born: 27 April 1982 (age 44) Pristina, Kosovo, SFR Yugoslavia (now Kosovo)
- Party: Vetëvendosje
- Education: London School of Economics (MSc)
- Occupation: Politician

Fitore Pacolli Dalipi (born 27 April 1982) is a Kosovar Albanian politician who currently serves as the Minister of Environment and Spatial Planning of the Republic of Kosovo. A long-term member of the Vetëvendosje movement and its leadership, she previously served multiple terms as a Member of the Assembly of Kosovo with a focus on environmental protection and agriculture.

== Early life and education ==
Fitore Pacolli was born on 27 April 1982 in Pristina. She pursued higher education with a focus on European integration and public administration. She earned a Master of Science (MSc) degree in European Union Politics and Governance from the London School of Economics.

== Academic and early career ==
From 2012 to 2015, Pacolli was a lecturer at Universum College in the Department of Administration and Political Sciences. She also lectured in the joint academic program between Riinvest College and the London School of Economics in Prishtina.

== Political career ==
=== Local government ===
In the 2010s, Pacolli served as chief of cabinet to the Mayor of Prishtina, Shpend Ahmeti.

=== Assembly of Kosovo ===
Pacolli was elected to the Assembly of the Republic of Kosovo, representing the Vetëvendosje movement. She chaired the Committee for Environment, Food, Agriculture, Planning and Development, was deputy chair of the Committee on Foreign Affairs and Diaspora, and was a member of the Committee on Integration She was also elected a member of the presidency of the Vetëvendosje movement.

=== Minister of Environment and Spatial Planning ===
On 11 February 2026, Prime Minister Albin Kurti appointed Pacolli as the Minister of Environment and Spatial Planning of the Republic of Kosovo. She has declared improving waste management and protecting water resources as priorities.

On 13 September 2026, she was sworn in in the same position as part of the fourth Kurti cabinet.
