= Ministry of Communities and Return (Kosovo) =

Government ministry of Kosovo

Ministry of Communities and Returns
- Albanian: Ministria për Komunitete dhe Kthim; Serbian: Министарство за заједнице и повратак Serbian: Ministarstvo za zajednice i povratak
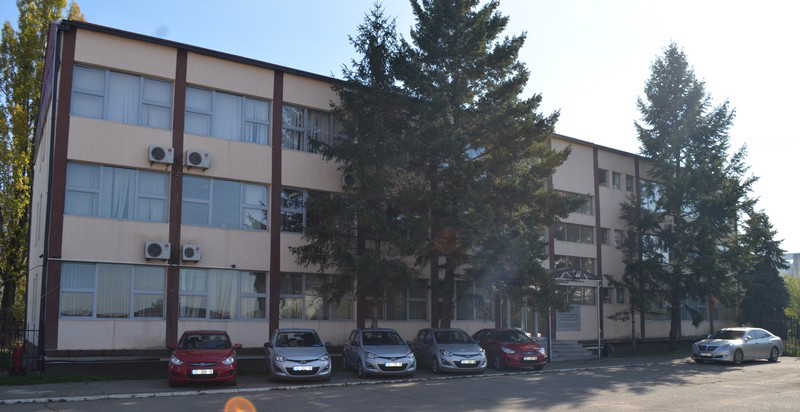
- Headquarters of the Ministry of Communities and Returns

Ministry overview
- Formed: January 2005
- Type: Government ministry
- Jurisdiction: Government of Kosovo
- Status: Active
- Headquarters: Kosovo Polje, Kosovo; 42.635997°N 21.082250°E
- Minister responsible: Nenad Rašić, Minister for Communities and Return
- Parent department: Government of Kosovo
- Website: mkk.rks-gov.net

The Ministry of Communities and Return (Albanian: Ministria për Komunitete dhe Kthim; Serbian: Министарство за заједнице и повратак; Serbian: Ministarstvo za zajednice i povratak; MCR) is a ministry of the Government of Kosovo responsible for policies concerning the rights and interests of communities and their members, as well as the return and integration of displaced people and refugees.

The ministry's responsibilities include the development of policies and legislation concerning community rights, the creation of conditions for the return of displaced people, support for the integration of communities and coordination with central and municipal institutions.

The current Minister for Communities and Return is Nenad Rašić.

== History ==
The ministry was established in January 2005 as part of the development of Kosovo's central institutions dealing with community affairs and the return of displaced people.

The European Commission later described the ministry as a central institution responsible for policy-making, coordination and oversight in the return process.

The ministry's internal organization was subsequently established through government regulations. Regulation No. 40/2012 established the internal organization and systematization of workplaces within the Ministry for Communities and Return.

The ministry's current administrative responsibilities are defined by Regulation (GRK) No. 02/2021 on the Areas of Administrative Responsibility of the Office of the Prime Minister and Ministries.

== Communities ==
The ministry is responsible for government policies concerning the rights and interests of communities and their members in Kosovo. It cooperates with ministries, municipalities and other public institutions on matters concerning community rights and interests.

The ministry also supports municipal mechanisms responsible for community affairs and works with civil society and international organizations on issues concerning communities. Government programs involving the ministry have included assistance for members of non-majority communities through grants and other forms of support.

== Return and reintegration ==
The return of displaced persons and refugees is one of the ministry's main areas of responsibility. The ministry promotes conditions for sustainable return and coordinates the return process with municipalities and other relevant institutions.

Regulation No. 01/2018 on the Return of Displaced Persons and Sustainable Solutions establishes procedures and institutional responsibilities for the return of displaced persons and sustainable reintegration.

The regulation provides for cooperation between the ministry, municipalities, municipal offices for communities and return and other relevant institutions. The ministry has also participated in European Union-supported return and reintegration programs. The European Commission identifies the Ministry for Communities and Return as a central institutional stakeholder in programs supporting return and reintegration in Kosovo.

Return programs have included measures such as house assistance, infrastructure support, in-come generation activities and community development.

== List of Ministers ==
The current Minister for Communities and Return is Nenad Rašić.

Rašić was appointed Minister for Communities and Return on 1 December 2022.

In October 2025, Nenad Vukmirović was appointed acting Minister for Communities and Return.

Rašić subsequently returned to the position of Minister for Communities and Return.

Portrait		Minister	Term of office			Cabinet	Party
Portrait		Minister	From	To	Period	Cabinet	Party
1	---	Slaviša Petković	26 January 2005	November 2006	1 year, 305 days	Haradinaj I Kosumi; Çeku	GIS
2	---	Radojica Tomić	22 February 2011	12 March 2013	2 years, 18 days	Thaçi III	SLS
3		Dalibor Jevtić	15 March 2013	9 December 2014	1 year, 269 days	Thaçi III	SLS
4		Dalibor Jevtić	24 April 2015	22 March 2021	5 years, 332 days	Mustafa cabinet Haradinaj II	SL
5		Goran Rakić	22 March 2021	5 November 2022	1 year, 228 days	Kurti II	SL
6		Nenad Rašić	1 December 2022	Incumbent	3 years, 273 days	Kurti II Kurti III	ZSPO

== See also ==
- Government of Kosovo
- Human rights in Kosovo
- Kosovo War
- United Nations Interim Administration Mission in Kosovo
- Demographics of Kosovo
