= Ali Aliu =

Albanian activist (1924–2010)

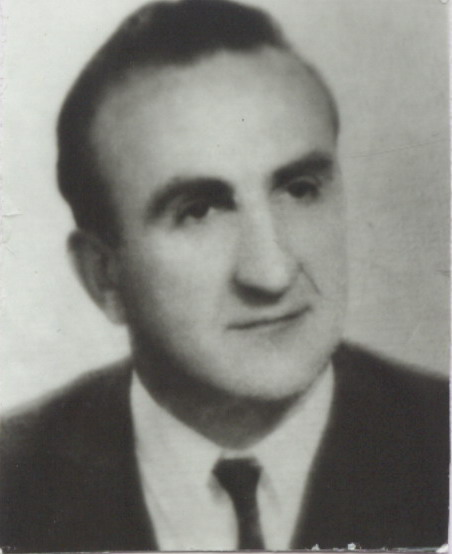
- Born: 22 June 1924; Preševo, Kingdom of Serbs, Croats and Slovenes
- Died: 25 April 2010 (aged 85); Pristina, Kosovo
- Resting place: City Cemetery, Pristina, Kosovo
- Occupations: writer, economist, teacher, politician
- Known for: anti-fascist resistance in World War II, activism for Albanian national unification, over 10 years imprisonment
- Children: Liburn Aliu
- Awards: Jubilee Academy organized by the Society of Political Prisoners of Kosovo to mark the 85th anniversary of the birth of the activist Ali Aliu (2009)

Ali Aliu (22 June 1924 – 25 April 2010) was a Kosovo Albanian writer, economist, teacher, politician and political prisoner who spent more than 10 years in prison for speaking out against the treatment of the ethnic Albanians in Yugoslavia as well as for fighting for Albanian national unification.

He was known as a man of resistance throughout his entire life. Aliu died on 25 April 2010.

== Early life and activism ==
Aliu was born around Lake Prespa. He attended school in Bitola and Skopje before studying Albanian literature and language at the University of Belgrade. Aliu would complete his doctorate in philology from the University of Pristina.

Aliu was an activist in the Second World War from 1941 onwards. As a member of the anti-fascist movement, he worked in Albania and in Kosovo.

After the Second World War, he continued his activism in liberation movements in Kosovo against the Yugoslav regime, aiming to separate Albanian territories occupied by Yugoslavia and to unite them with the mother state of Albania.

He was arrested three times and spent ten years in Yugoslav prisons.

== Aliu in postwar Kosovo ==
Ali Aliu is the father of activist and member of the Assembly of Kosovo, Liburn Aliu, who is also a founding member of Vetëvendosje! (Movement for Self-Determination).

He was known as "Baca Ali" (Uncle Ali) by Albanians and a role model and ideological inspiration to many Albanian anti-fascists and activists for self-determination and Albanian National Unification.

At his burial, on 26 April 2010, the Kosovo Police, under orders from international EULEX police, tried to arrest Albin Kurti, activist of Lëvizja Vetëvendosje (Movement for Self-Determination in Kosovo). The people participating in the burial resisted the police and did not allow them to arrest Albin Kurti. Kurti had been at the burial in order to pay his respects and hold a speech on the role of Baca Ali in shaping Albanian resistance.

== Notes and references ==
References:
