= Saranda Bogujevci =

Kosovar politician (born 1985)

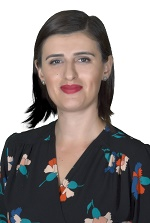
- Bogujevci in 2017

Minister of Culture and Tourism
- Incumbent
- Assumed office 11 February 2026
- Prime Minister: Albin Kurti
- Preceded by: Hajrulla Çeku (as Minister of Culture, Youth and Sports)

Personal details
- Born: 12 June 1985 (age 41)
- Party: Vetëvendosje

Saranda Bogujevci (born 12 June 1985) is a Kosovar politician serving as minister of culture and tourism since 2026. From 2017 to 2026, she was a member of the Assembly of Kosovo. At the age of 13 in 1999, 14 of her family members were killed in the Podujevo massacre, including her mother and two brothers, and she was shot 16 times.
