= Dimal Basha =

Kosovan analyst and politician (born 1979)

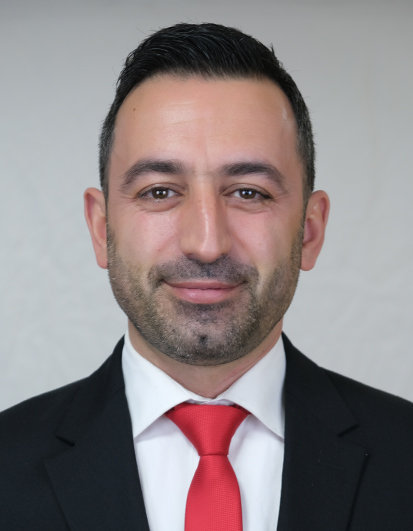
- Basha in 2022

Minister of Infrastructure and Transport
- Incumbent
- Assumed office 11 February 2026
- Preceded by: Liburn Aliu; Hysni Durmishi (acting)

6th Speaker of the Assembly of Kosovo
- In office 26 August 2025 – 11 February 2026
- Preceded by: Avni Dehari (acting)
- Succeeded by: Albulena Haxhiu

Member of the Assembly of the Republic of Kosovo
- In office 7 October 2019 – 11 February 2026

Personal details
- Born: 12 October 1979 (age 46) Ferizaj, SAP Kosovo, SR Serbia, SFR Yugoslavia
- Party: Vetëvendosje
- Education: John Jay College of Criminal Justice; The New School
- Occupation: Politician, analyst, manager

Dimal Basha (born 12 October 1979) is a Kosovan analyst, manager and politician serving as the sixth Speaker of the Assembly of Kosovo, elected on 26 August 2025. He previously served as a Member of the Assembly for three terms representing Vetëvendosje.

== Early life and education ==
Dimal Basha was born on 12 October 1979 in Ferizaj, SAP Kosovo, SR Serbia, SFR Yugoslavia (now Kosovo). He completed his undergraduate studies at the John Jay College of Criminal Justice in New York, graduating Summa Cum Laude in International Criminal Law. He then earned a Master's degree in International Relations, with a focus on Conflict and Security, from The New School in New York.

== Professional career ==
Basha worked in the office of former U.S. Congressman Eliot Engel and later as a Qualitative Data Analyst at a Federal Court in the United States. He also held managerial positions in England, Switzerland, and the U.S.

== Political career ==
Basha was elected as a Member of the Assembly of the Republic of Kosovo for three terms representing Vetëvendosje. During his tenures, he served on several parliamentary committees, including:

- Committee on Foreign Affairs
- Committee on Legislation
- Committee for Oversight of the Kosovo Intelligence Agency (AKI)
- Committee on Stabilization and Association

On 26 August 2025, following the 2025 Assembly deadlock, Basha was elected as Speaker of the Kosovo Assembly with 73 votes in favour, 30 against, and 3 abstentions. He succeeded Glauk Konjufca in this role.
