= Ahmet Haxhiu =

Kosovo Albanian political activist

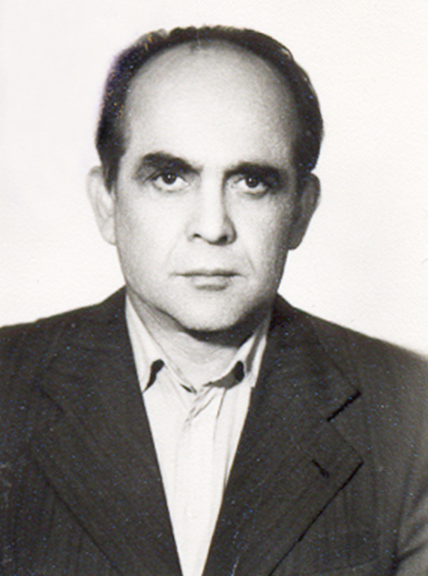
- Born: 6 May 1932; Pristina, Kingdom of Yugoslavia (modern Kosovo)
- Died: 6 July 1994 (aged 62); Pristina, FR Yugoslavia (modern Kosovo)
- Known for: Political activism
- Movement: Revolutionary Movement for Albanian Unification, People's Movement of Kosovo
- Relatives: Albulena Haxhiu (granddaughter)
- Awards: Hero of Kosovo

Ahmet Haxhiu (6 May 1932 – 6 July 1994) was a Kosovo Albanian political activist and one of the main gunrunners for Kosovo Liberation Army in the early 1990s. He was one of the leading figures of the Revolutionary Movement for Albanian Unification, which aimed at uniting various illegal groups who fought against the government of FR Yugoslavia. Haxhiu later joined People's Movement of Kosovo and was considered the right hand of Adem Demaçi.

On 28 November 2012 (Albanian Flag Day), Ahmet Haxhiu was awarded "The Order Hero of Kosovo" by the fourth President of the Republic of Kosovo, Atifete Jahjaga.

He was the grandfather of Kosovar politician and acting president Albulena Haxhiu.
