= Artane Rizvanolli =

Kosovar politician (1984)

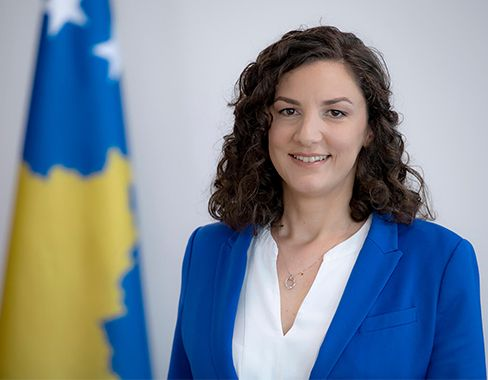
- Official portrait, 2021

Minister of Economy
- Incumbent
- Assumed office 22 March 2021
- President: Glauk Konjufca (acting); Vjosa Osmani; Albulena Haxhiu (acting)
- Prime Minister: Albin Kurti
- Deputy: Mentor Arifaj; Getoar Mjeku; Triera Kasumi Berisha
- Preceded by: Muharrem Nitaj (acting); Blerim Kuçi

Personal details
- Born: 7 May 1984 (age 42)
- Party: Independent (affiliated with Vetëvendosje)
- Children: 1 son
- Education: University of Pristina; University of Staffordshire
- Artane Rizvanolli's voice Discussing ICT at Bled Strategic Forum, Slovenia; Recorded 2 September 2024

Artane Rizvanolli (born 7 May 1984) is a Kosovar economist, currently serving as minister of economy of the Republic of Kosovo.

Rizvanolli studied economics at the University of Pristina, and obtained her master's and PhD from the University of Staffordshire. She worked as a researcher, policy advisor and, and university lecturer for over a decade before her appointment as a government minister.

Her portfolio covers energy, mining, publicly owned enterprises, and ICT. As a minister, she has spearheaded major reforms in the energy sector, including a new energy strategy, capital investments in generation and storage capacities, efficiency measures, and regional integration.

== Early life and education ==
Artane Rizvanolli was born in Pristina, Kosovo, in a family originating from Gjakova. Both her parents are medical doctors.

Rizvanolli completed her bachelor's degree in economics at the University of Pristina. She then obtained her master's in economics for business analysis from University of Staffordshire in the United Kingdom. She received her PhD in economics from Staffordshire University in 2012 with a dissertation on the link between human capital and foreign direct investment in European economies in transition.

== Early career ==
Rizvanolli worked as a researcher at the Riinvest Institute in Pristina for six years and later served as a researcher and policy advisor for domestic and international organizations. Her areas of focus included employment, private sector development, the diaspora, and public finances.

Rizvanolli has authored several policy papers and scholarly articles published in international journals.

She lectured at Riinvest College from 2007 until her appointment to the government in 2021.

== Minister of Economy ==
On 22 March 2021, Rizvanolli was appointed minister of economy in the second Kurti government. Her portfolio covers energy, mining, publicly owned enterprises, and ICT.

=== Energy reforms ===
Rizvanolli took office at the outset of the global energy crisis. Kosovo was particularly threatened because of its outdated generation capacities, high energy intensity, and reliance on high-price imports during the winter months. The Kosovar government responded with several financial packages, which according to the World Bank provided the highest per-capita support in the region. Particular assistance targeted energy savers, families in need, and businesses.

In the meantime, Rizvanolli began to work on a new strategy to reshape Kosovo's energy sector through 2031. A draft of the strategy was presented in June 2022, and adopted by the Kosovo parliament in March 2023, following extensive public consultations. Strategy objectives include decarbonization, supply security and affordability, with at least 35-percent electricity consumption from renewables, 1600 megawatts of renewables capacities, and a 32-percent reduction of greenhouse gas emissions by 2031.

On 27 July 2022, Rizvanolli signed the Compact Program Agreement with Alice P. Albright, CEO of the U.S. Millennium Challenge Corporation, to support the construction of a battery storage facility. As part of the deal, MCC will grant Kosovo 202 million dollars, while the Kosovar government will add 40 million of its funds. The program entered into force in April 2024, to be completed within a five-year deadline.

Under Rizvanolli's leadership, the Ministry of Economy rolled out Kosovo's first renewables auction—a 100-MW solar project on public land. Six international groups competed, with a European consortium led by a Kosovo Swiss diaspora company placing the winning bid of 48.88 euros per MWh in April 2024. A second auction for a 100-wind park was launched in December 2024.

Rizvanolli implemented subsidy schemes for energy efficiency. A 5-million euro scheme targeted households purchasing efficient heating appliances for the first time in 2022. The Ministry of Economy and the Kosovo Energy Efficiency Fund spent 35 million euros donated by the European Union to support households and businesses through 2023 and 2024. Over 30.000 households have benefited from the schemes, with energy savings at around 20 percent.

=== ICT ===
Rizvanolli inaugurated the completion of the "Last Village" project, which secured broadband internet connection for all inhabited settlements in Kosovo. The Kosovo Digital Economy (KODE) project established the National Research and Education Network (KREN) to serve education institutions and link them with the European network GÉANT. KODE also secured free high-speed connection for 107 schools and 43 healthcare providers.

Rizvanolli completed the construction of a tech park in Pristina, which now serves ICT startups and professionals.

=== February 2025 elections ===
Rizvanolli ran for a seat in the February 2025 Kosovan parliamentary election as part of the Vetëvendosje list.

== Personal life ==
In addition to her native Albanian, she speaks English and Serbian. She is married with one child.
