= ICITAP =

ICITAP is the acronym referring to the International Criminal Investigative Training Assistance Program, of the United States Department of Justice.

ICITAP was established in 1986, in response to a need the US State Department identified in the training and development of foreign police forces, at that time in Latin America. Since its inception, ICITAP has developed into a broad Department of Justice program that has at its core the fostering of International Stability and Rule of Law. Mostly serving in post-conflict countries, ICITAP adds to the stability and development of not only the country it is in but the region.

Although commonly confused as a portion of the International Police, the two are separate entities. Similarities between the two end at the fact that both require experienced police officers with an extensive background in certain fields of expertise. ICITAP is different in that it offers a holistic approach to regional stability and Rule of Law that incorporates the experience, history and influence the Department of Justice enjoys.

ICITAP has served in East Timor, Kosovo, Iraq, Afghanistan, Haiti, Croatia, Macedonia, Jordan, Albania, and Serbia. All total, ICITAP has developed training, provided support, developed law enforcement infrastructure to more than sixty countries worldwide.

== Background ==
US assistance to foreign police began in the 1950s, and increased in the early 1960s when the Kennedy administration became concerned about growing communist insurgent activities and established a public safety program within the Agency for International Development (AID) to train foreign police. By 1968 the United States was spending $60 million a year to train police in 34 countries in areas such as criminal investigation, patrolling, interrogation and counterinsurgency techniques, riot control, weapon use, and bomb disposal The United States also provided weapons, telecommunications, transportation, and other equipment. In the early 1970s, the Congress became concerned over the apparent absence of clear policy guidelines and the use of program funds to support repressive regimes that committed human rights' abuses. As a result, "the Congress determined that it was inadvisable for the United States to continue supporting any foreign police organizations".

== History ==
It was created in 1986 to help gain prosecution in key human rights cases in El Salvador and to bolster the criminal investigative capacity of Latin American security forces. Beginning with Panama in 1990, however, ICITAP became the principal U.S. agency involved in filling the "institutional gap," restructuring of the entire law enforcement apparatus of countries in transition. "The Criminal Division's International Criminal Investigative Training Assistance Program (ICITAP) and Overseas Prosecutorial Development Assistance and Training (OPDAT) office foster, support, and strengthen democratic principles and structures of law enforcement in foreign countries. Particularly in those countries that have recently embraced democracy, ICITAP and OPDAT provide training for police, prosecutors, and the judiciary and advice on American laws and programs to combat crime within a democratic framework."

As the U.N. role in police monitoring and training during peacekeeping operations has expanded over the past several years, ICITAP collaboration with U.N.-sponsored police monitors (CIVPOL) from around the world has grown as well. Although the ICITAP mandate prevents it from doing actual policing in postintervention scenarios, its capacity to build local police forces is increasingly viewed as the ticket to quick military withdrawal following interventions or peacekeeping missions. As the scope of ICITAP activities has widened, so has its geographic reach. In 1996 alone, ICITAP initiated new projects in Rwanda, Bosnia, Kazakhstan, Kyrgyzstan, Belarus, Ukraine, Uzbekistan, and the Croatian province of Eastern Slavonia, with new projects set for Brazil, Albania, Belize, and Liberia.

The judiciary in particular presents a major problem, because judges and magistrates cannot be trained and employed within the same time frame as a police force. This aspect must be addressed, however, as a functioning police force cannot exist without a judiciary to serve.

=== National Police Force Development ===
After the U.S. invasion of Panama in December 1989, ICITAP implemented a program to help develop the newly formed Panamanian Public Force using $13.2 million in fiscal years 1990 and 1991 foreign assistance funds. This effort intended a professional, civilian national police force that is fully integrated into Panamanian society, capable of protecting its people, and dedicated to supporting the Panamanian constitution, laws, and human rights. Since the program began, ICITAP has trained about 5,500 police officers and provided institutional development assistance, such as help in starting the National Police Academy, improved recruitment procedures, and creating an in-house self-monitoring organization. In addition, ICITAP has worked closely with U.S. Embassy and Panamanian government officials to develop plans and policies appropriate for a police force in a democracy.

== International Programs ==
Currently, the I.C.I.T.A.P. is in 44 countries and maintains 16 field offices all over the globe. Through its assistance and quality training it has made a difference in the countries they partnered with.

=== Africa and Middle East ===
- Benin
- Gabon
- Gambia
- Ghana
- Kenya
- Madagascar
- Mozambique
- Nigeria
- Senegal
- SouthAfrica
- Sudan
- Tanzania
- Uganda
- Zambia

=== Asia and Pacific ===
- Bangladesh
- Indonesia
- Nepal
- Pakistan
- Philippines
- Thailand

=== Latin America and Caribbean ===
- Colombia
  - Justice System Development
  - Identification of Victims and Recovery of Evidence from Mass Graves
  - Sexual Assault Investigations
  - Crime Scene Analysis and Processing

=== Europe and Eurasia ===
- Albania
- Armenia
- Azerbaijan
- Bosnia-Herzegovina
- Bulgaria
- Croatia
- Georgia
- Kazakhstan
- Kosovo
- Kyrgyzstan
- Macedonia
- Moldova
- Montenegro
- Serbia
- Tajikistan
- Ukraine
- U.S.–GUAM
