= Arbër Aliu =

Albanian footballer (1988–2019)

Personal information
- Full name: Arbër Aliu
- Date of birth: 13 January 1988
- Place of birth: Durrës
- Date of death: 29 June 2019 (aged 31)
- Position: Defender

Youth career
- –2006: KF Partizani Tirana

Senior career*
Years	Team	Apps	(Gls)
2006–2007	Partizani		
2007–2009	Kamza		
2009–2010	Turbina Cërrik		
2010	Skënderbeu	4	(0)
2011–2012	Tërbuni Pukë		
2013–2019	Erzeni		
- * Club domestic league appearances and goals

Arbër Aliu (13 January 1988 – 29 June 2019) was an Albanian footballer. He last played as a defender for KF Erzeni. He died on 29 June 2019 after a personal watercraft accident.

== Club career ==
Before joining KF Erzeni, he was playing for KF Tërbuni Pukë in the Albanian Superliga, and was previously on the books of Partizani Tirana.
