= Ministry of Justice (Kosovo) =

Government ministry of Kosovo

- Ministria e Drejtësisë

Ministry overview
- Jurisdiction: Government of Kosovo
- Headquarters: Rilindja Tower, Kosta Novakoviq, 10000, Pristina, Kosovo; 42.659567°N 21.15637°E
- Minister responsible: Donika Gërvalla-Schwarz
- Deputy Minister responsible: Vigan Qorrolli
- Website: md.rks-gov.net

The Ministry of Justice (Albanian: Ministria e Drejtësisë) is a department of the government of Kosovo responsible for the administration of justice in Kosovo. The ministry has its headquarters in Pristina, and its acting current minister is Blerim Sallahu.

== Responsibilities ==
Established in 2005, the Ministry of Justice of Kosovo has responsibilities such as the following:

- Develop policies that help with the preparing and implementing of legislation in the field of justice
- Ensure the effective functioning of the prosecutorial system without hindering the Office of the Public Prosecutor and the conducting of criminal investigations
- Train prosecutors in cooperation with the Kosovo Judicial Institute, as well as organize examinations for the qualification of prosecutors, lawyers and other legal professionals
- Ensure coordination on matters pertaining to the correctional service
- Develop and implement policies to ensure fair and effective access of members of all communities to the justice system;
- Provide assistance to victims of crime (e.g., domestic violence and human trafficking victims) and oversee the Office of the Victims Assistance Coordinator

Although the ministry was created in 2005, it would not be until 2006 that the first minister was appointed.

== Officeholders (2008–present) ==
- Nekibe Kelmendi (2008-2010) [1st female]
- Haki Demolli (2010-2011)
- Hajredin Kuçi (2011-2016)
- Dhurata Hoxha (2016) [2nd female]
- Abelard Tahiri (2016–2020)
- Albulena Haxhiu (2020) [3rd female]
- Selim Selimi (2020–2021)
- Albulena Haxhiu (2021–2025)
- Blerim Sallahu (2025-2026) (Acting)
- Donika Gërvalla-Schwarz (2026–)

== See also ==
- Justice ministry
- Politics of Kosovo
