= Arbërie Nagavci =

Kosovar politician

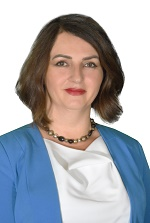

Minister of Education, Science and Technology
- In office 22 March 2021 (Note: Caretaker since 23 March 2025) – 11 February 2026
- President: Vjosa Osmani
- Prime Minister: Albin Kurti
- Preceded by: Ramë Likaj
- Succeeded by: Hajrulla Çeku

Personal details
- Born: 29 March 1970 (age 56) Đakovica, Yugoslavia (now Gjakova, Kosovo)
- Party: Vetëvendosje

Arbërie Nagavci (born 29 March 1970) is a Kosovar politician, Vetëvendosje member and current Minister of Education, Science and Technology.

== Career ==
Nagavci completed Law studies at the University of Pristina. She also completed her Master of International Law studies at the same university. Nagavci has a long experience in the field of education and upbringing. Since 2010 she has been engaged as a consultant, trainer and advisor for education in various programs in local and international institutions such as: USAID, GIZ, Council of Europe, MEST. From 2014 to 2017 she was the director of the Municipal Directorate of Education in Prishtina.

In the elections of October 6, 2019, Arbërie Nagavci was elected a member of the Assembly of Kosovo and on December 26 of the same year she was nominated and voted for the First Deputy Speaker of the Assembly of Kosovo. Arbërie Nagavci has become part of the Vetëvendosje party in 2013 and is currently a member of the Presidency.

Nagavci was named on 22 March 2021 from the prime minister Albin Kurti as the new Minister of Education, Science and Technology.

== Personal life ==
Nagavci is married and has two children.
