= Garentina Kraja =

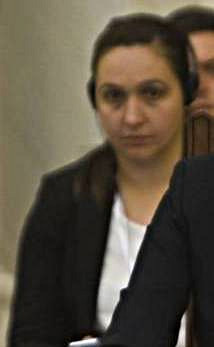
Garentina Kraja takes notes at 2014 SEECP Summit in Bucharest

Garentina Kraja was Political Adviser to President of the Republic of Kosovo Atifete Jahjaga.

Kraja advised the President on a large portfolio of national security issues, including countering violent extremism, as well as domestic politics, such as during the political impasse following 2014 general elections and in addressing the plight of survivors of wartime rape. As the President's representative, Kraja took part in the Strategic Security Sector Review that includes the creation of Kosovo's Armed Forces. Kraja is also a speechwriter for the President.

== Education ==
Garentina graduated with a BA and MA degree in Political Science at Yale University. Her thesis on the recruitment practices of guerrilla movements - which highlights the role of counterinsurgency tactics and social networks as catalysts of successful recruitment - won her Yale University's prize for best comparative essay in 2011. Prior to her enrollment in university, Kraja attended the prestigious four-month leadership program Yale World Fellows, selected from over 600 candidates worldwide in 2006.

== Professional career ==
Before her studies, she was part of the first generation of journalists with the founding of the Kosovar daily Koha Ditore. During 1997 and 1998 she covered and reported widely on the war in Kosovo. From 2001 to 2007 Kraja was The Associated Press correspondent in Prishtina, where she reported on the aftermath of the war, Kosovo's institution-building, the international protectorate, the security arrangements, human rights and birth of the new nation through the internationally mediated negotiations between Kosovo and Serbia on the future status of Kosovo.

Kraja also occasionally lectures at the American University in Kosovo on comparative politics and the role of religion and its interaction with globalization.
