= Ministry of Education, Science and Technology (Kosovo) =

Government ministry of Kosovo

Ministry of Education, Science, Technology and innovation
- Ministria e Arsimit, Shkencës, Teknologjisë dhe Inovacionit
- Coat of arms of Kosovo

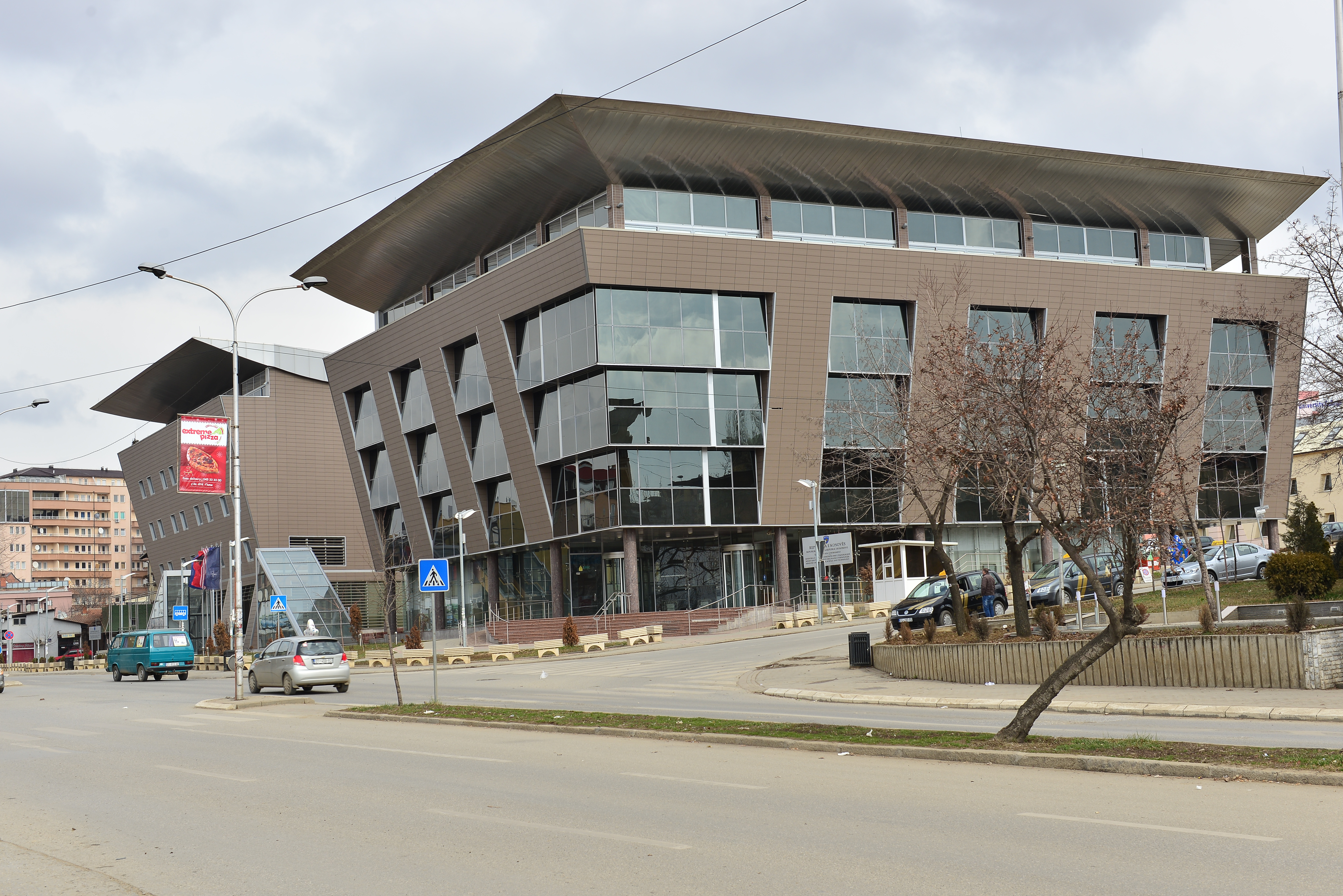
- Headquarters of the Ministry of Education, Science and Technology

Ministry overview
- Jurisdiction: Government of Kosovo
- Headquarters: Rruga Agim Ramadani, 10000, Pristina, Kosovo; 42°39′47″N 21°9′59″E
- Minister of Education, Science and Technology responsible: Hajrulla Çeku
- Deputy Minister of Foreign Affairs responsible: Taulant Kelmendi
- Website: masht.rks-gov.net

The Ministry of Education, Science, Technology and Innovation (Albanian: Ministria e Arsimit, Shkencës, Teknologjisë dhe Inovacionit) is a department of the government of Kosovo responsible for the policy on education, science and technology of Kosovo.

== List of ministers ==
Portrait	Minister	Term of office			Cabinet	Party
Portrait	Minister	From	To	Period	Cabinet	Party
7	Arbërie Nagavci	22 March 2021	11 February 2026	4 years, 326 days	Albin Kurti	LVV
8	Hajrulla Çeku	11 February 2026	Incumbent	21 days	Albin Kurti	LVV
