= Ministry of Economy (Kosovo) =

Government ministry of Kosovo

- Ministria e Ekonomisë
- Coat of arms of Kosovo

Ministry overview
- Jurisdiction: Government of Kosovo
- Headquarters: Sheshi Zahir Pajaziti, 10000, Pristina, Kosovo; 42°39′40.81″N 21°9′39.89″E
- Minister responsible: Artane Rizvanolli
- Deputy Minister responsible: Getoar Mjeku; Nenad Stanojević
- Website: me.rks-gov.net

The Ministry of Economy (Albanian: Ministria e Ekonomisë) is a department of the government of Kosovo responsible for the economic policy of Kosovo. The ministry has its headquarters in Pristina, with Artane Rizvanolli as the incumbent economic minister in the second cabinet of Albin Kurti.

== List of ministers ==
Portrait	Minister	Term of office			Cabinet	Party
Portrait	Minister	From	To	Period	Cabinet	Party
7	Artane Rizvanolli	22 March 2021	Incumbent	4 years, 24 days	Kurti II	Independent

== See also ==
- Economy of Kosovo
