= Human rights in Kosovo =

Human Rights in Kosovo has been a controversial subject due to the country's history of ethnic tension and its struggle for independence. This was highlighted during the onset of the Kosovo War and the subsequent intervention of the North Atlantic Treaty Organization (NATO). Particularly, this war and the other conflicts in the Balkans were the focus of the European human rights instruments such as the Council of Europe, the Organization for Security and Co-operation in Europe, and the European Union.

After it achieved independence in 2009, Kosovo has posted several milestones in upholding and the protection of human rights.

== Ethnic conflict ==
Kosovo has multiple ethnic minorities that include the Serbs, Kosovar Albanians, Roma Turks, Muslim Slav, and other minorities. The war that transpired from 1998 to 1999 was the third conflict involving the former Yugoslavia and came after the wars in Bosnia and Croatia. All of these were orchestrated by the Serbian strongman Slobodan Milosevic, the leader of Serbia and Montenegro (Federal Republic of Yugoslavia), which controlled Kosovo as a province before the war.

Milosevic's 1987 campaign promise to defend the Serbs in Kosovo catapulted him to power. The Serbs have strong emotional ties to Kosovo as they consider the region as the cradle of their nation. Before Milosevic's regime, Kosovo enjoyed an autonomous status that gave ethnic Albanians rights, guaranteed by the 1974 Yugoslav constitution. When Milosevic eventually became president of Serbia, he terminated Kosovo's special status and suppressed the Albanian language and culture. These led to the emergence of non-violent opposition and the rise of parallel state structures such as the Democratic League of Kosovo (LDK). This also led to the establishment on the Kosovo Liberation Army (KLA), an ethnic Albanian separatist militia that aimed to liberate Kosovo.

By 1997, Serbian authorities began a campaign against Albanians as part of its crackdown of KLA and its increasingly aggressive and violent guerilla campaigns. Two years later, the Serbian authorities had forcibly displaced thousands of predominantly Muslim Kosovar Albanians, who constituted the majority of the province's population. This was carried out in response to the uprising by the insurgent nationalist group. Speaking before the UN Security Council, then-UN Secretary-General Kofi Annan reported:

Fighting in Kosovo has resulted in a mass displacement of civilian populations, the extensive destruction of villages and means of livelihood and the deep trauma and despair of displaced populations. Many of the villages have been destroyed by shelling and burning following operations conducted by federal and Serbian government forces.

Annan cited the disproportionate use of force and actions of security forces, which were carried out for the purpose of terrorizing and subjugating the civilian population. In total, the war has displaced and cast out nearly one million Albanians out of the country on forced marches. In addition, Serbian security forces pursued a campaign of terror in communities. According to available data from 10,000 to 15,000 Albanians were killed and 80 percent of the population of Kosovo was displaced. Due to the predominantly Muslim Albanians constituting the majority of the population of Kosovo, the international community claimed Milosevic's campaign was designed to depopulate the province.

NATO launched Operation Allied Force in 1999 as a response to the ongoing ethnic cleansing and human rights abuses perpetrated by the Serbian forces. The goal was to compel the Milosevic government to cease its actions in Kosovo. After this was achieved and the establishment of the UN Mission in Kosovo (UNMIK), waves of violence against ethnic minorities persisted. For instance, as authorities were preparing to accommodate the arrival of incoming NATO troops, the diocesan reports to the Serbian Orthodox Church revealed harrowing retaliatory abuses were still being committed. An account covering Pristina for instance, stated that “a wave of unprecedented violence, looting, murders, and abductions spread throughout the Province, especially in the cities, where the main victims were the remaining Serbs, Roma, Gorani, and Muslim Bosniacs.” Official data confirmed by both Serbian authorities and UNMIK cited that by January 1, 1998, there were 1,303 missing individuals, which include 944 Serbs, 210 Muslim Roma, and 149 ethnic Albanians.

It was reported that UNMIK officials were baffled and frustrated by the relentless attacks against minorities even after the war and cited one particular problem – that the UN's involvement in Kosovo through the UNMIK lacked legislative support. The UN Security Council resolution 1244, which established this mission, did not have any provision that stipulated the protection of minorities and the promotion of multi-ethnicity. Observers, including UNMIK officials, maintained that this lack of explicit commitment to a multi-ethnic Kosovo sent the wrong signals to extremist who perpetrated violence. Later international response to the ethnic conflict in Kosovo addressed the issues of cultural rights. This, for instance, became one of NATO's strategies during its temporary administration of Kosovo to pacify the area and establish a path toward long-term peace.

One of the measures that Kosovo has taken in response to its history of human rights abuses was the creation of the Truth and Reconciliation Commission. This agency is mandated to investigate human rights violations that were committed during the Kosovo War. Organizations were also established to prosecute war criminals. An example is the Humanitarian Law Center HLC, which was founded by the Serbian sociologist and human rights advocate Nataša Kandić. After the war, it opened an office in Pristina and worked with government officials, victims, and witnesses to prosecute war criminals.

== Human trafficking ==
One of the critical human rights concerns in Kosovo involves human trafficking. In the early 2000s, the country was viewed as one of the centers of human trafficking in the Balkans. For instance, according to Amnesty International, trafficked women, who came from the poorest countries of Europe, were sold in transit to clients in Western Europe such as Italy, Netherlands, and the United Kingdom. Aside from the violation of their freedom, about 36 percent of these women were denied any form of medical care and the majority were forced into unprotected sex. By 2023, Kosovo has made significant inroads in addressing the human trafficking problem. The Kosovo Police (KP) now has a Trafficking in Human Beings Directorate, which investigates all trafficking cases through its eight regional units. There is also a special coordinator assigned within the Office of the State Prosecutor to handle trafficking cases.

== Other issues ==
In 2022, the United States Department of State cited persisting human rights-related problems such as corruption and impunity on the part of the government of Kosovo. These abuses also include politically motivated killings. Other issues involve different forms of abuse and violence as well as the harassment of ethnic minorities. It is noted that while authorities have made significant strides in addressing human rights violations and abuses, punishment and enforcement of laws sometimes lacked consistency.
