= Selim Selimi =

Minister of Justice, Rule of Law Expert

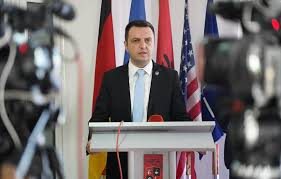

Minister of Justice
- In office 3 June 2020 – 22 March 2021
- President: Hashim Thaci
- Prime Minister: Avdullah Hoti
- Preceded by: Albulena Haxhiu
- Succeeded by: Albulena Haxhiu

Personal details
- Born: 28 October 1980 (age 45)
- Citizenship: Kosovo
- Education: Duke University
- Profession: Lawyer and Rule of Law Specialist
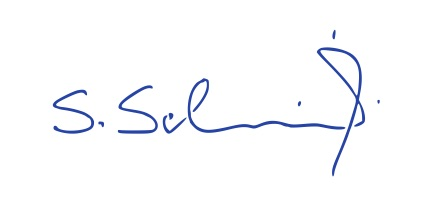
- Signature

Selim Selimi (born 28 October 1980) is a Kosovar lawyer and rule of law specialist, who served as the Minister of Justice of the Republic of Kosovo. He also worked as the Rule of Law Advisor and Chief of Staff to the Prime Minister of Kosovo and as Rule of Law Advisor to the President of Kosovo.

Selimi has extensive experience working for international organizations including OSCE, UNDP, UNOPS, U.S. Department of Justice - ICITAP and U.S. State Department's Bureau of International Narcotics and Law Enforcement Affairs - INL covering mainly rule of law, justice and governance. He is a certified Attorney at Law and holds a master's degree in International Development Policy - Law and Development from Sanford School of Public Policy at Duke University in the United States and a Master's Degree in Political Sciences - Management of Development, from University of Turin in Italy.

== Early life ==
Selim Selimi was born on 28 October 1980 in Gjilan (Kosovo). He lived in Presevo where he attended elementary and secondary school.

== Education ==
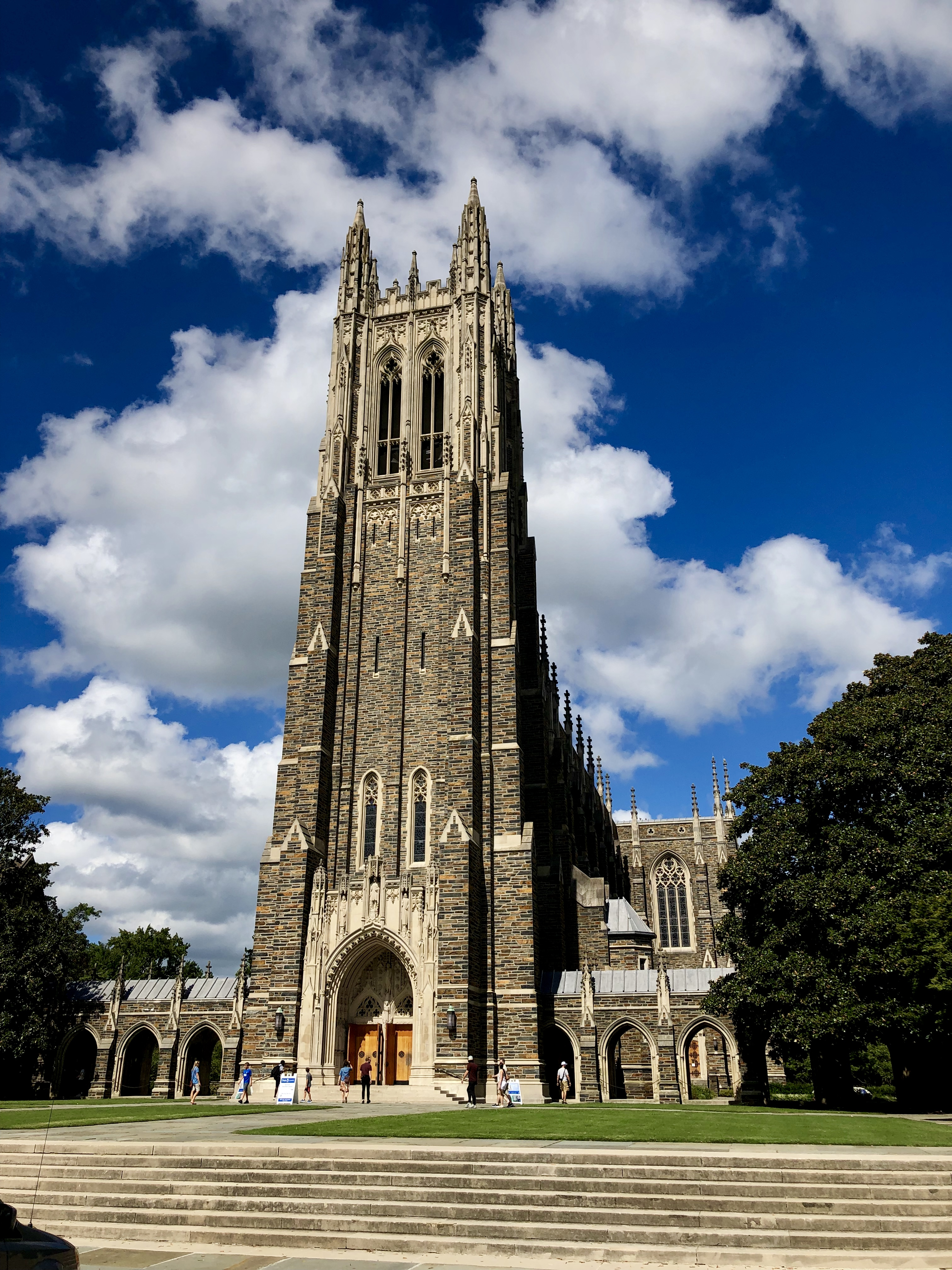
Duke University

Selimi holds a law degree from the University of Prishtina and is a certified Attorney at Law by the Kosovo Bar Association.

He has a master's degree in Political Sciences - Management of Development, from University of Turin in Italy and a master's degree in International Development Policy - Law and Development from Sanford School of Public Policy at Duke University in the United States on a Kosovo American Education Fund (KAEF) Scholarship.

While at Duke, Selim was the MIDP class representative for Sanford School of Public Policy's Board of Visitors. He was also the graduation speaker for the Masters in International Development Policy class of 2010. Selimi was featured in 50 Years of Public Policy at Duke

== Career ==
Selim Selimi started his career at OSCE, Kosovo Police School in March 2000. He held various positions in Police Field Training Office, Criminal Investigation Department and was appointed Chief of Curriculum Development Section. Selimi has also worked for OSCE Mission in Kosovo's Implementation Team at the Police Inspectorate from 2006 to 2008 as a Criminal Code and Criminal Procedure Code Expert. Selimi worked for the U.S. Department of Justice - ICITAP as a Rule of Law Advisor, based in the office of Kosovo Chief State Prosecutor.

For UNDP Selimi worked in Geneva, Switzerland for Bureau for Crisis Prevention and Recovery and in Pristina, Kosovo as a Project Manager for Parliamentary Affairs

Selimi was appointed a Rule of Law Advisor to the 4th President of Kosovo, Atifete Jahjaga in 2012. He was the Coordinator of The National Anti-Corruption Council that was established by the President of Kosovo, to increase cooperation and coordination among the Kosovo institutions in the forefront of the fight against corruption. In 2013 Selimi was appointed Special Envoy to Initiative for RECOM, a regional commission for the establishment of facts about war crimes and other serious violations of human rights committed in the former Yugoslavia.

Selim Selimi was appointed the Rule of Law Advisor to Prime Minister Ramush Haradinaj in 2018. He was also the Coordinator of the High Level Council on Rule of Law, Chaired by the Prime Minister. In 2019 he assumed the duties of the Chief of Staff to the Prime Minister. In this position he was a member of the Kosovo Security Council and head of the technical dialogue between Kosovo and Serbia.

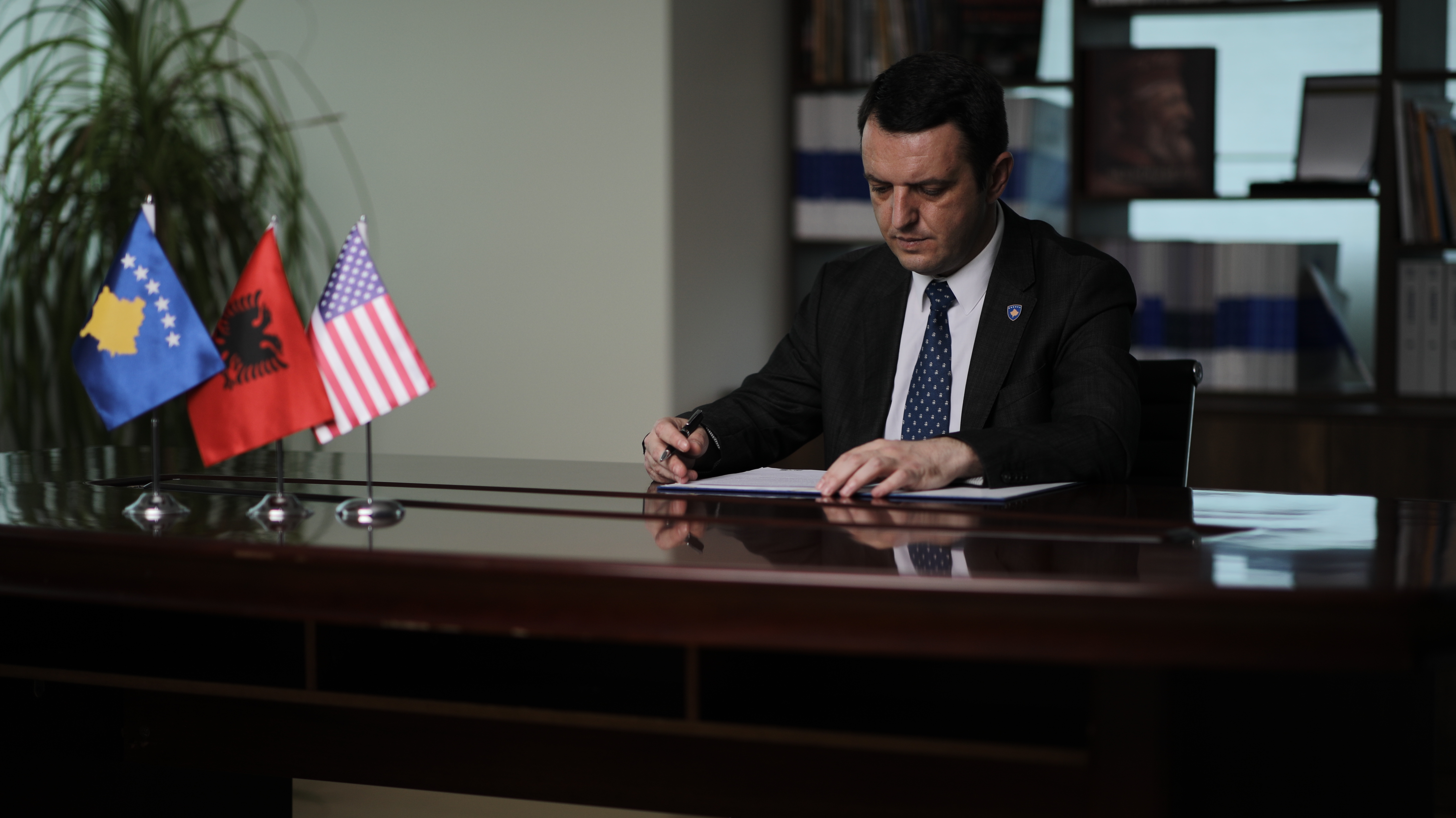
Selim Selimi - Minister of Justice

Selim Selimi served as Minister of Justice of the Republic of Kosovo from 3 June 2020 to 22 March 2021. During his tenure as the Minister of Justice he concluded the Functional Review of the Kosovo Rule of Law System and presented to the Parliament various pieces of legislation, among others, the Civil Code of Kosovo, Draft Law on the Anti-Corruption Agency, Draft Law on Criminal Procedure, Draft Law on Establishing the Commercial Court of Kosovo, Draft Law on the Disciplinary Responsibility of Judges and Prosecutors, Draft Law on Execution of Criminal Sanctions, Draft Law on Correctional Service, etc. Selimi formed the Inclusive Working Group that produced the first document for the process of Vetting of Judges and Prosecutors. During Minister's Selimi tenure in coordination with USAID, Kosovo was for the first time included in the “World Justice Project Rule of Law Index”, which ranked Kosovo first in the Western Balkans and second in the Eastern Europe and Central Asia region for respecting the rule of law in 2020 and 2021.

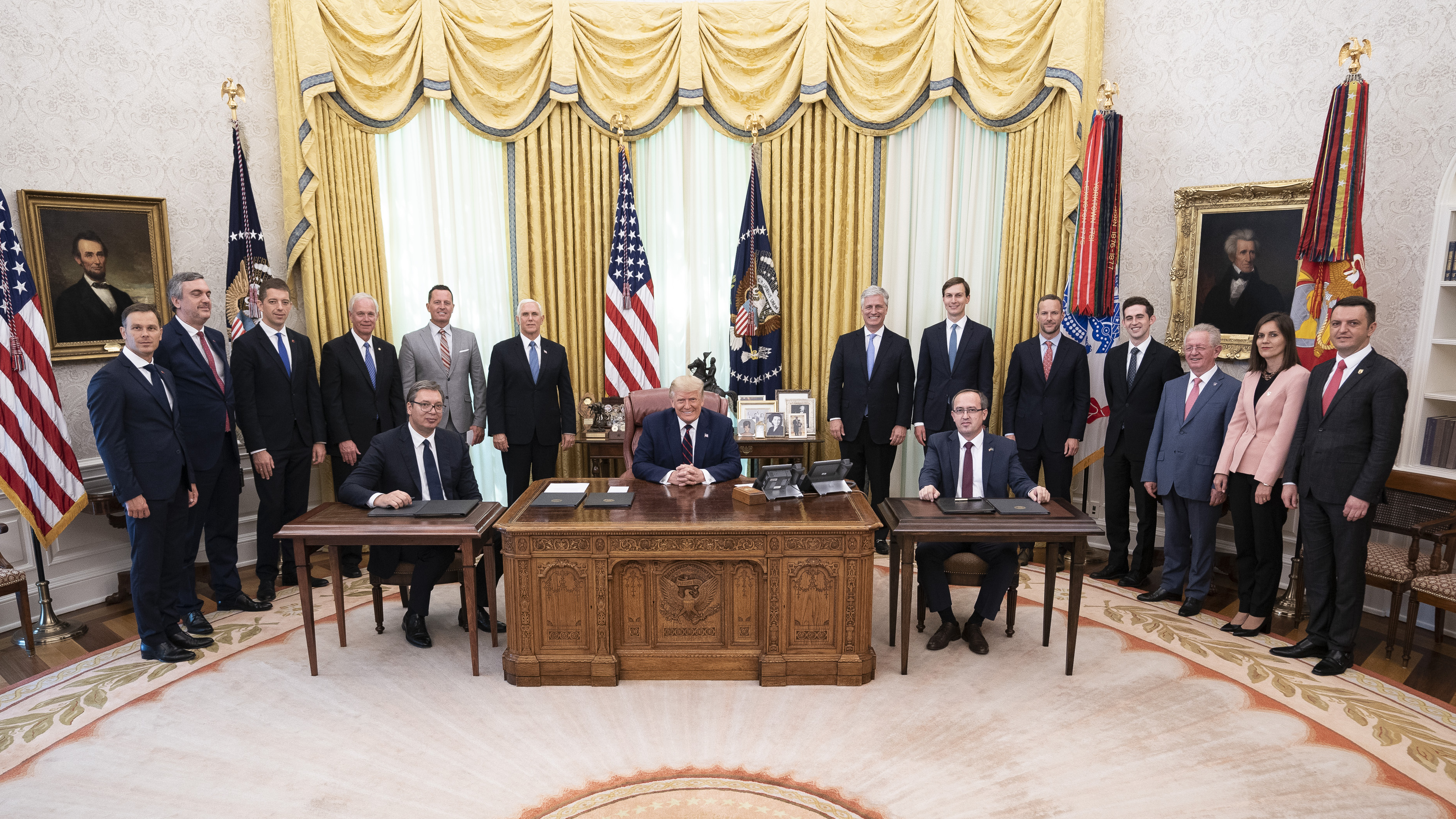
Kosovo Serbia Normalization Agreement - Oval Office - White House

Minister Selimi was part of the delegation led by Kosovo Prime Minister Avdullah Hoti that negotiated and signed the Kosovo and Serbia Economic Normalization agreements on September 4, 2020, at the Oval Office of the White House in the presence of Donald Trump, President of the United States. The deal encompassed freer transit, including by rail and road, while both parties agreed to work with the Export–Import Bank of the United States and the U.S. International Development Finance Corporation and to join the Mini Schengen Zone. The agreement also included mutual recognition between Israel and Kosovo.

After serving as Minister, he continued working as an Attorney at Law in Prishtina, Kosovo.

Selim Selimi also worked as Rule of Law Advisor for a US State Department - Bureau of International Narcotics and Law Enforcement Affairs (INL) funded project in East Africa implemented by UNOPS, based in Port Louis, Mauritius. The project is designed to provide advice and expertise to INL East Africa Transnational Organized Crime program (EA - TOC) and national-level institutions on rule of law matters and assist the law enforcements and prosecutions offices of Western Indian Ocean Islands of Mauritius, Seychelles, Madagascar and Comoros with advice and training to improve the interdiction, investigation, and prosecution of crimes.
