= Glauk Konjufca =

Kosovan politician

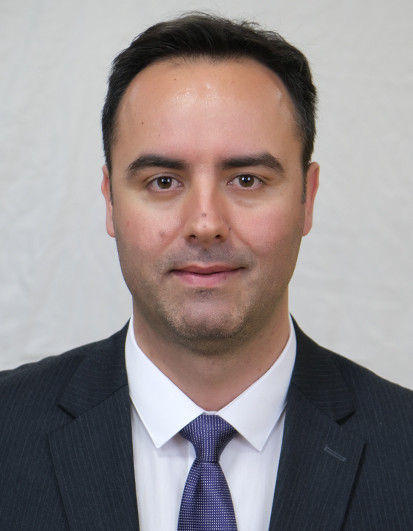
- Official portrait, 2021

Minister of Foreign Affairs
- Incumbent
- Assumed office 11 February 2026
- Prime Minister: Albin Kurti
- Preceded by: Donika Gërvalla-Schwarz
- In office 3 February 2020 – 3 June 2020
- Prime Minister: Albin Kurti
- Preceded by: Behgjet Pacolli
- Succeeded by: Meliza Haradinaj-Stublla

5th Speaker of the Assembly of Kosovo
- In office 22 March 2021 – 15 April 2025
- Preceded by: Vjosa Osmani
- Succeeded by: Avni Dehari (acting)
- In office 26 December 2019 – 3 February 2020
- Preceded by: Kadri Veseli
- Succeeded by: Vjosa Osmani

Acting President of Kosovo
- In office 22 March 2021 – 4 April 2021
- Prime Minister: Albin Kurti
- Preceded by: Vjosa Osmani (acting)
- Succeeded by: Vjosa Osmani

Personal details
- Born: 25 July 1981 (age 45) Pristina, SFR Yugoslavia (modern-day Kosovo)
- Party: Vetëvendosje

Glauk Konjufca (born 25 July 1981) is a Kosovar activist, journalist, and politician who served as the Speaker of the Assembly of Kosovo from 22 March 2021 to 26 August 2025. Before being elected speaker of the National Assembly of the Republic of Kosovo, he served as a deputy of the National Assembly, leader of the Vetëvendosje parliamentary group, Minister of Foreign Affairs of the Republic of Kosovo, and acting president of Kosovo until the election of his successor, Vjosa Osmani.

== Early life and education ==
Konjufca was born in Pristina. He studied philosophy at the University of Pristina. During his studies, he served as deputy director of the Center for Rights student organization.

Konjufca is the author of a book on Georg Wilhelm Friedrich Hegel and several other publications on philosophy.

== Political career ==
Konjufca has been an activist of the Vetëvendosje Movement since its founding in 2005, and was, among others, active as the editor of the movement's weekly newspaper. In 2010, when Vetëvendosje first ran for elected office, he was elected to the Assembly of Kosovo.

=== Member of Parliament ===
He served as deputy speaker of the Assembly from 2011 to 2014 and again from 2015 to 2017, and led the Vetëvendosje parliamentary group from 2014 to 2019.

In 2012, Konjufca told Deutsche Welle that he supported the unification of Albania and Kosovo to form a Greater Albania, saying, "The national union of Kosovo and Albania is an indisputable right of the Albanian people, who were unjustly divided by history.” At the time, it was reported that Vetëvendosje would seek a referendum on unification.

=== Speaker of the Assembly ===
After Vetëvendosje's victory in the 2019 Kosovan parliamentary election, Konjufca was appointed speaker of the Assembly on 26 December 2019 by a vote of 75 to 27. He resigned on 3 February 2020, taking office as the Minister of Foreign Affairs of Kosovo. He served in this position until 3 June 2020, when the new government led by the then-opposition parties was established.

Konjufca was the second most voted candidate in the 2021 Kosovan parliamentary election, which Vetëvendosje won by a landslide. On 22 March 2021, he was elected speaker of the Assembly by a vote of 69 to 33. With a vacant presidency, Konjufca was also serving as acting president until the election of Vjosa Osmani.

As Speaker of the Assembly of Kosovo, Glauk Konjufca has been an outspoken advocate for Kosovo’s sovereignty and has taken a critical stance on the EU-led dialogue with Serbia. He publicly supported Prime Minister Albin Kurti's claims of bias and partisanship by the European Union Special Representative for the Serbia-Kosovo dialogue, Miroslav Lajcak, arguing that Lajčák’s positions have been continuously closely aligned with the interests of Serbia, while being clearly unfavorable to Kosovo’s national interests or statehood.

Following the February 2025 Kosovan parliamentary elections, Glauk Konjufca did not seek re-election as Speaker of the Assembly of Kosovo. His party, Vetevendosje, nominated then-Minister of Justice Albulena Haxhiu for the position; however, the Assembly has failed to elect a new speaker after multiple attempts, resulting in a National Assembly deadlock and a political stalemate that has eventually delayed the formation of a new government. Konjufca was subsequently declared as prime minister-designate as part of a compromise agreement, but failed to win a majority in the Assembly on 19 November.

Political offices
Preceded by Kadri Veseli	Speaker of the Assembly of Kosovo; 2019–2020	Succeeded by Vjosa Osmani
Preceded by Vjosa Osmani	Speaker of the Assembly of Kosovo; 2021–2025	Succeeded by Dimal Basha
Preceded by Vjosa Osmani; Acting	President of Kosovo; Acting; 2021	Succeeded by Vjosa Osmani
