= Hajrulla Çeku =

Kosovar politician; Minister of Culture, Youth and Sports

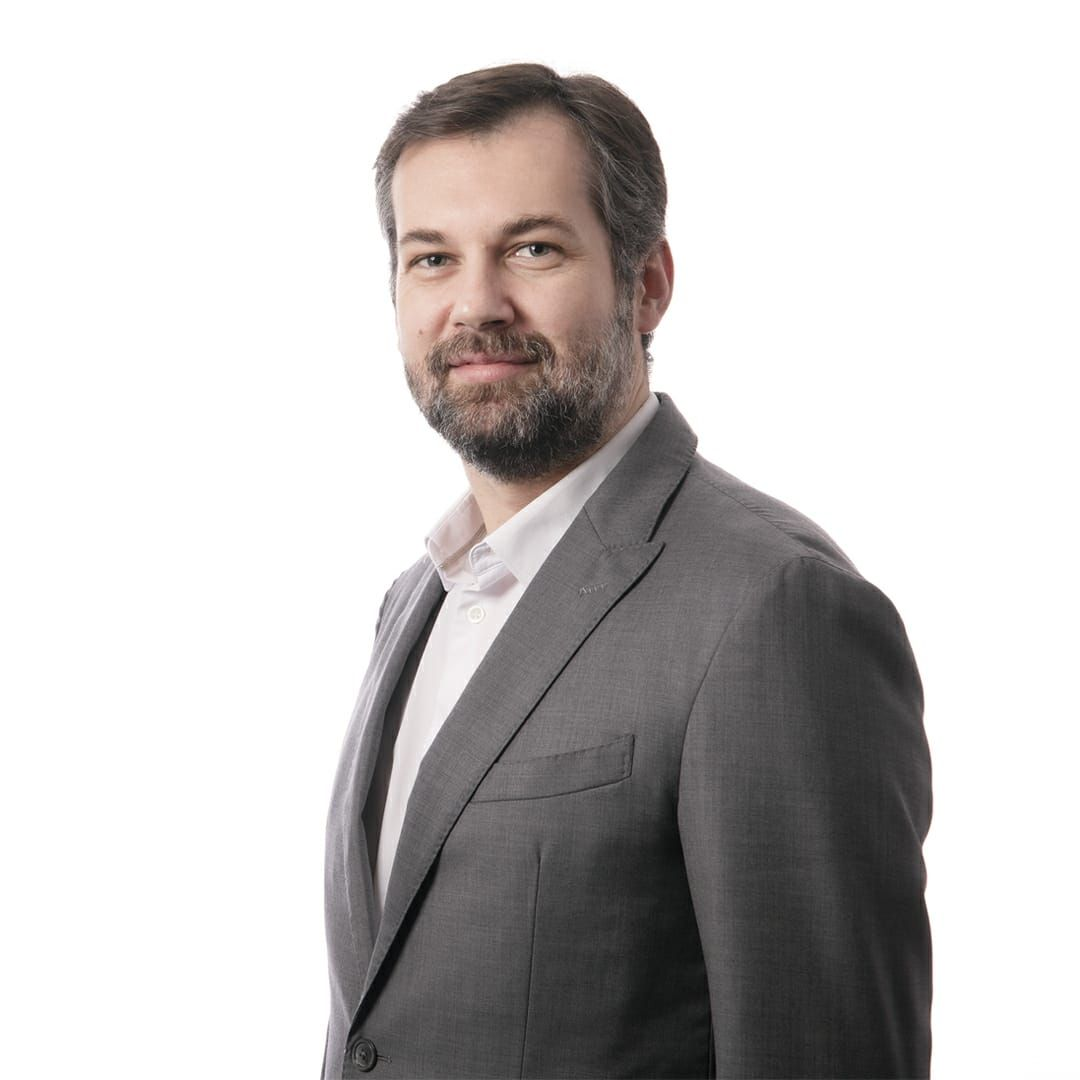
- Official portrait, 2021

Minister of Education, Science and Technology
- Incumbent
- Assumed office 11 February 2026
- Prime Minister: Albin Kurti
- Deputy: Përparim Kryeziu
- Preceded by: Arbërie Nagavci

Minister of Culture, Youth and Sports of the Republic of Kosovo
- In office 22 March 2021 (Note: Caretaker since 23 March 2025) – 11 February 2026
- President: Glauk Konjufca (acting); Vjosa Osmani
- Prime Minister: Albin Kurti
- Preceded by: Vlora Dumoshi
- Succeeded by: Saranda Bogujevci (Note: As Minister of Culture and Tourism); Blerim Gashani (Note: As Minister of Youth and Sports)

Deputy Minister of Tourism and Environment of Albania
- In office September 2017 – October 2018
- President: Ilir Meta
- Prime Minister: Edi Rama
- Minister: Blendi Klosi

Personal details
- Born: 7 July 1983 (age 43) Prizren, SAP Kosovo, Yugoslavia (now Kosovo)
- Party: Vetëvendosje
- Spouse: Eli Gashi
- Children: Mia
- Education: University of Prishtina; University of Trento; University of Regensburg

Hajrulla Çeku is a Kosovar politician, currently serving as minister of culture, youth and sports of the Republic of Kosovo. Prior to politics, Çeku was a civil society activist in matters of culture, tourism, urban planning and environment. He also served as deputy minister of tourism and environment of the Republic of Albania.

== Career ==
Çeku studies political science at the University of Prishtina and received his master's degree in governance and local development from the University of Trento, Italy, and the University of Regensburg, Germany.

Çeku was part of civic initiatives to protect the urban structure of Kosovo cities and worked to improve community access and empower vulnerable groups. Over the years he was involved in many local and international organizations. He also served as a member of the Kosovo Tourism Council, and as an external expert supported the drafting of a national policy for integrated conservation of cultural heritage in Kosovo.

He has completed several international training programs in cultural heritage protection, human rights, tourism management, leadership skills in the United States, Malta, Germany, Belgium, Croatia and France.

Çeku joined the Vetëvendosje Movement prior to the 2019 parliamentary elections. He successfully ran for a seat in the Assembly of Kosovo, serving in the 7th legislature from 2019 to 2021. He served as Chairman of the Parliamentary Inquiry Committee regarding the privatization process in Kosovo, member of the Committee on Agriculture, Forestry, Rural Development, Infrastructure and Environment and member of the Committee on the Rights and Interests of Communities and Returns. He was also the chairman of the Forum for Parliamentary Transparency, and part of the Group of Green Deputies.

Çeku was elected to parliament again in the 2021 elections, but gave up his seat to become minister of culture, youth and sports in the Second Kurti cabinet.

In addition to his mother tongue, he speaks fluent English, Turkish and Serbian. He is married and has a daughter.
