= Armend Muja =

Kosovar politician (born 1981)

- Armend Muja

Member of the Assembly of the Republic of Kosovo

Personal details
- Born: 20 November 1981 (age 44) Mitrovica, FPR Yugoslavia (now Kosovo)
- Party: Vetëvendosje

Armend Muja (born 20 November 1981) is a Kosovar Albanian politician and member of the Assembly of the Republic of Kosovo. A member of the Vetëvendosje caucus, he serves as chairman of the budget and finance committee and sits on the economy committee.

== Biography ==
Muja holds a MSc in political economy from the London School of Economics and studied PhD in international economics at Corvinus University of Budapest, and has taught international economics and Riinvest College.

A well-known pundit with frequent appearances on political talk shows, Muja joined the Vetëvendosje movement before the 2021 general election. With 43 982 votes, he became one of the most-voted members of parliament.

He is married with two children.
