= Liburn Aliu =

Albanian politician

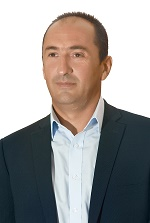

Minister of Environment, Spatial Planning and Infrastructure
- In office 22 March 2021 (Note: Caretaker since 23 March 2025) – 27 August 2025
- President: Vjosa Osmani
- Prime Minister: Albin Kurti

Personal details
- Born: 10 April 1975 (age 51) Pristina, Yugoslavia (now Pristina, Kosovo)
- Party: Vetëvendosje

Liburn Aliu (born 10 April 1975;) is a Kosovar politician, Vetëvendosje member and former Minister of Environment, Spatial Planning and Infrastructure.

== Career ==
Liburn Aliu was born on April 10, 1975, in Prishtina, to activist Ali Aliu. He attended primary school in the school "Hasan Prishtina", secondary school in the gymnasium "Xhevdet Doda" in Prishtina and the University of Prishtina, where he graduated from the Faculty of Civil Engineering and Architecture, Department of Architecture.

Aliu has worked as an architect in high design and construction, and has been involved in the restoration of cultural heritage monuments, where he has overseen the restoration work.

Liburn Aliu's political activities began in 1994 with the National Movement for the Liberation of Kosovo.
