= Albulena Haxhiu =

Kosovar politician (born 1987)

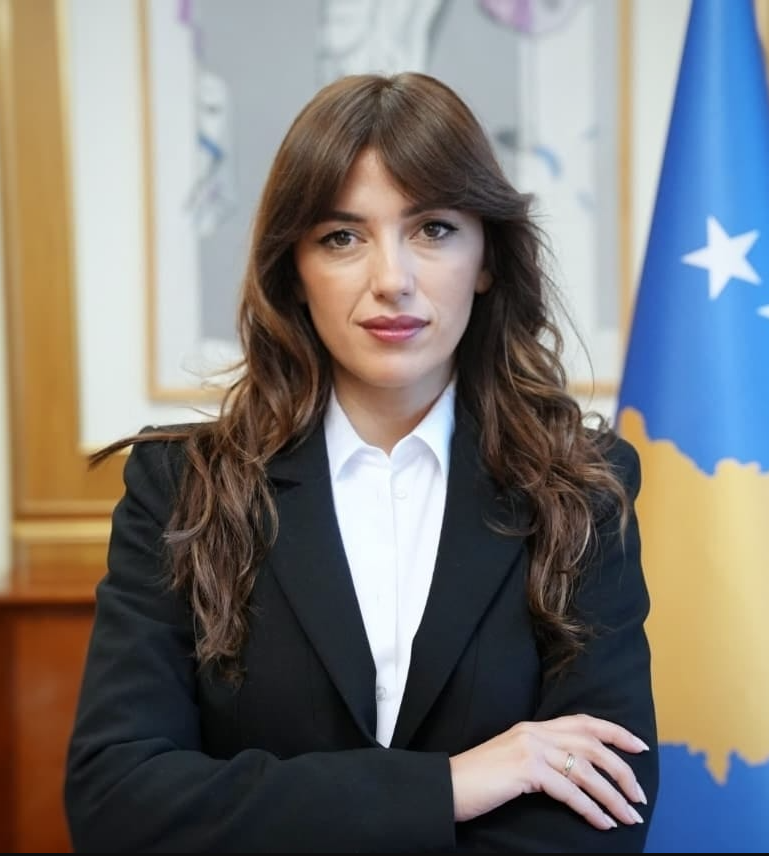
- Haxhiu in 2026

Speaker of the Assembly of Kosovo
- Incumbent
- Assumed office 9 September 2026
- Preceded by: Avni Dehari (acting)
- In office 11 February 2026 – 6 August 2026
- Preceded by: Dimal Basha
- Succeeded by: Avni Dehari (acting)

Acting President of Kosovo
- In office 4 April 2026 – 7 October 2026
- Prime Minister: Albin Kurti
- Preceded by: Vjosa Osmani
- Succeeded by: Justina Pula

Minister of Justice
- In office 22 March 2021 – 26 August 2025 (Note: Caretaker: 23 March – 26 August 2025)
- Prime Minister: Albin Kurti
- Preceded by: Selim Selimi
- Succeeded by: Blerim Sallahu (acting)
- In office 3 February 2020 – 3 June 2020
- Prime Minister: Albin Kurti
- Preceded by: Abelard Tahiri
- Succeeded by: Selim Selimi

Personal details
- Born: 11 May 1987 (age 39) Pristina, Kosovo, Yugoslavia (now Pristina, Republic of Kosovo)
- Party: Vetëvendosje
- Spouse: Alban Krasniqi
- Relations: Ahmet Haxhiu (grandfather)
- Children: 3
- Profession: Jurist

Albulena Haxhiu (Note: Albanian: ['albuleˈna haˈdʒiu]) (born 11 May 1987) is a Kosovar politician who served as the acting president of Kosovo from April 2026 until October 2026. She has previously served as the Minister of Justice of Kosovo, and as a member of parliament for Vetëvendosje in the Assembly of Kosovo.

== Biography ==
=== Early life and education ===
Albulena Haxhiu was born on 11 May 1987 in Pristina what was then the Socialist Federal Republic of Yugoslavia (now Pristina, Kosovo). Her grandfather was Kosovar political activist Ahmet Haxhiu. Haxhiu studied law and finance at the University of Pristina. She then studied criminal law at the South East European University in Tetovo.

=== Early political career ===
A member of Vetëvendosje (LVV), Haxhiu was elected as a member of the Assembly of the Republic of Kosovo in 2010. She was re-elected in 2014, 2017, and 2019. In the Assembly, she sat on or chaired several committees, including Committee on Legislation and the Subcommittee on Mandates, Immunities and Rules of Procedure.

After LVV became the largest party in the Assembly in 2019, Haxhiu was appointed as Minister of Justice in February 2020 by Prime Minister Albin Kurti in his first cabinet, but only served until June 2020 after the government lost a no-confidence vote. After LVV won an even larger share of the vote in the 2021 Kosovan local elections, Haxhiu was re-appointed as Minister of Justice in the second Kurti cabinet. As Minister of Justice, she faced criticism for failing to enact judicial reform and violating judicial independence.

=== Assembly Speaker ===
Despite LVV losing seats in the February 2025 Kosovan parliamentary election, Haxhiu was selected as the party's candidate for Assembly speaker. Other factions in the Assembly repeatedly blocked her candidacy, and in August 2025 Dimal Basha was elected instead. After the December 2025 Kosovan parliamentary election, Haxhiu was elected as speaker by a vote of 66-44, with eight abstentions.

=== Acting presidency ===
After President Vjosa Osmani's term expired in April 2026 without a new president having been elected, Haxhiu automatically became acting president as speaker of the Assembly. On 28 April, the Assembly again failed to elect a president. As a result, it was dissolved and new elections held.On 7 October 2026 Justina Shiroka Pula assumed office as President, thus terminating Haxhiu's acting presidency.

=== Personal life ===
She is married and has three children. Haxhiu's husband, Alban Krasniqi, was a candidate for mayor of Malishevë in 2013, 2021 and 2025.
