= Albin Kurti =

Prime Minister of Kosovo (2020; since 2021)

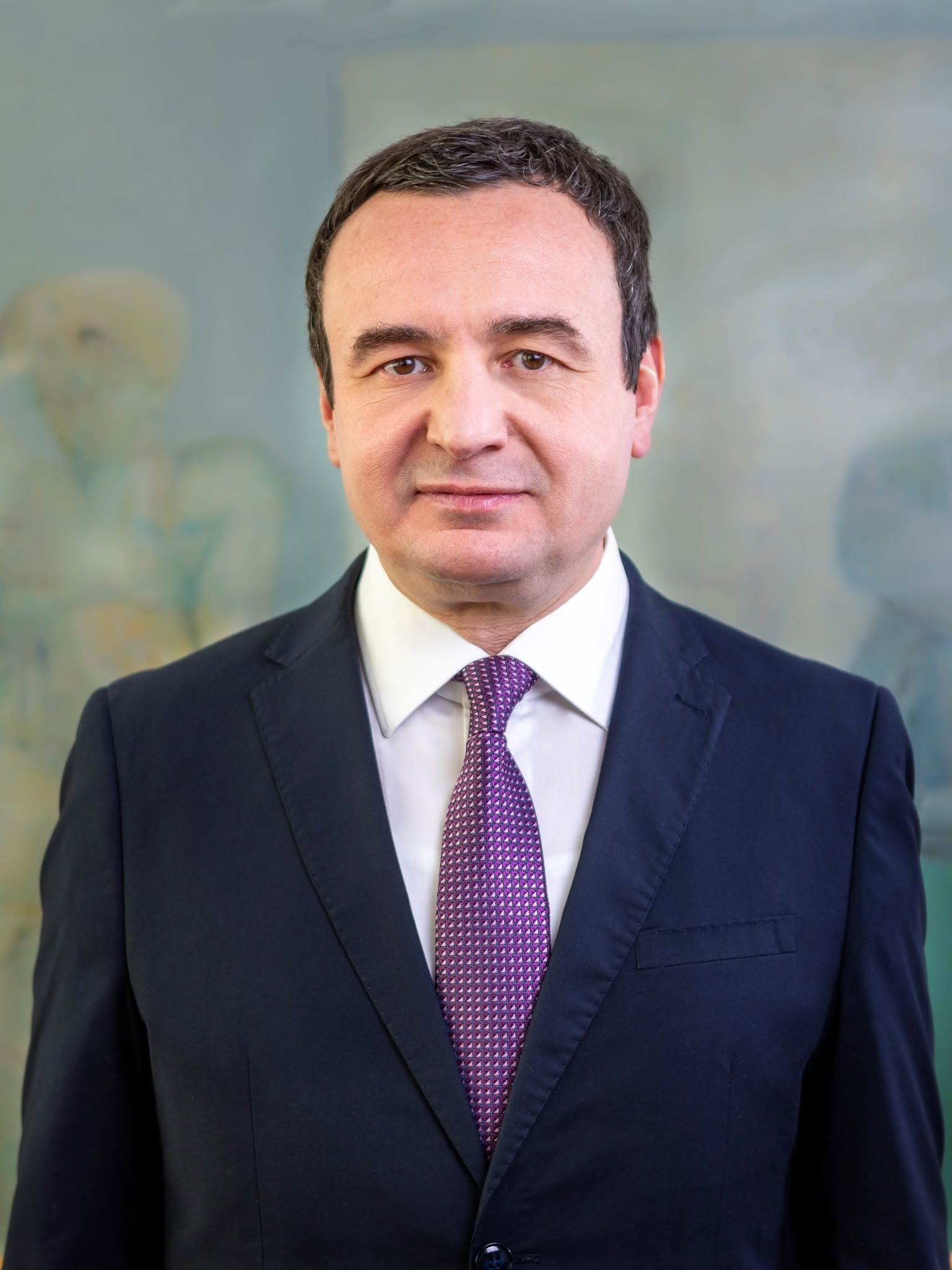
- Kurti in 2022

Prime Minister of Kosovo
- Incumbent
- Assumed office 22 March 2021
- President: Glauk Konjufca (acting); Vjosa Osmani; Albulena Haxhiu (acting); Justina Pula
- Deputy: Besnik Bislimi; Donika Gërvalla-Schwarz; Emilija Redžepi; Glauk Konjufca; Fikrim Damka
- Preceded by: Avdullah Hoti
- In office 3 February 2020 – 3 June 2020
- President: Hashim Thaçi
- Deputy: Avdullah Hoti; Haki Abazi
- Preceded by: Ramush Haradinaj
- Succeeded by: Avdullah Hoti

Leader of the Opposition
- In office 3 June 2020 – 22 March 2021
- Preceded by: Kadri Veseli
- Succeeded by: Enver Hoxhaj
- In office 9 December 2014 – 3 February 2020
- Preceded by: Isa Mustafa
- Succeeded by: Kadri Veseli

Leader of Vetëvendosje
- Incumbent
- Assumed office 21 January 2018
- Preceded by: Visar Ymeri
- In office 12 June 2005 – 28 February 2015
- Preceded by: Position established
- Succeeded by: Visar Ymeri

Member of the Assembly of the Republic of Kosovo
- In office 2010 – 3 February 2020

Personal details
- Born: 24 March 1975 (age 51) Pristina, SAP Kosovo, SFR Yugoslavia
- Party: Vetëvendosje
- Spouse: Rita Augestad Knudsen
- Children: 1
- Education: University of Pristina
- Albin Kurti's voice Speaking at Leaders' Panel, Bled Strategic Forum, Slovenia; Recorded 28 August 2023

Albin Kurti (Albanian: ['albin 'kuɾti]; born 24 March 1975) is a Kosovar politician and legislator who has been the Prime Minister of Kosovo since 2021, having previously held the office from February to June 2020. He came to prominence in 1997 as the vice-president of the University of Pristina student union, and a main organiser of non-violent student demonstrations of 1997 and 1998. Kurti then worked in Adem Demaçi's office when the latter became the political representative of the Kosovo Liberation Army (KLA). Kurti has been a member of the Assembly of the Republic of Kosovo since 2010 in three consecutive legislatures.

== Life and career ==
=== Early life ===
Albin Kurti was born on 24 March 1975 in Pristina, Kosovo of SFR Yugoslavia. Kurti's father, Zaim Kurti originates from an ethnic-Albanian family from the village of Sukobin in Ulcinj Municipality, Montenegro; an engineer, he moved to Pristina in search of employment. Kurti's mother, Arife Kurti is a retired elementary school teacher, born and educated in Pristina. Kurti also has two brothers, Arianit and Taulant. Kurti finished his elementary and middle education in Pristina. He graduated university in 2003 in Telecommunications and Computer Engineering at the Faculty of Engineering at the University of Pristina.

=== Kosovo War ===
Kurti first came to prominence in October 1997, as one of the leaders of the student protests in Kosovo. Albanian students protested against the occupation of the University of Pristina campus by the Yugoslav police. The occupation had started in 1991 and had led to ethnic Albanian academic staff and students having to use alternative locations for their classes due to them being barred from using university premises by Serbian law. The protests were crushed violently, but the students and Kurti did not stop the resistance and they organised other protests in the following months. In July 1998, Kurti was the assistant of the political representative of the UÇK, Adem Demaçi. These actions made him a target of the Yugoslav police.

In April 1999, during the NATO bombing of Yugoslavia, Kurti was arrested and severely beaten by Yugoslav forces. He was first sent to the Dubrava Prison, but as the Serbian army withdrew from Kosovo, they transferred him to a prison in Požarevac on 10 June 1999. Later that year, he was charged with "jeopardising Yugoslavia's territorial integrity and conspiring to commit an enemy activity linked to terrorism" and was sentenced to 15 years in prison.

Kurti was released in December 2001 by Yugoslavia's post-Milošević government after being pardoned by President Vojislav Koštunica amid international pressure. Since his release, he worked outside party politics in Kosovo but was a severe critic of the United Nations Interim Administration Mission in Kosovo (UNMIK) and of corruption. He organised non-violent protests in support of the families of those whose relatives disappeared in the war, and in favour of Kosovo's self-determination. On 23 April 2003 Kurti graduated with a degree in Computer and Telecommunications Sciences from the University of Pristina. He was an activist for the Action for Kosovo Network (AKN), which was formed in 1997 as a movement focused on human rights and social justice, education, culture and art.

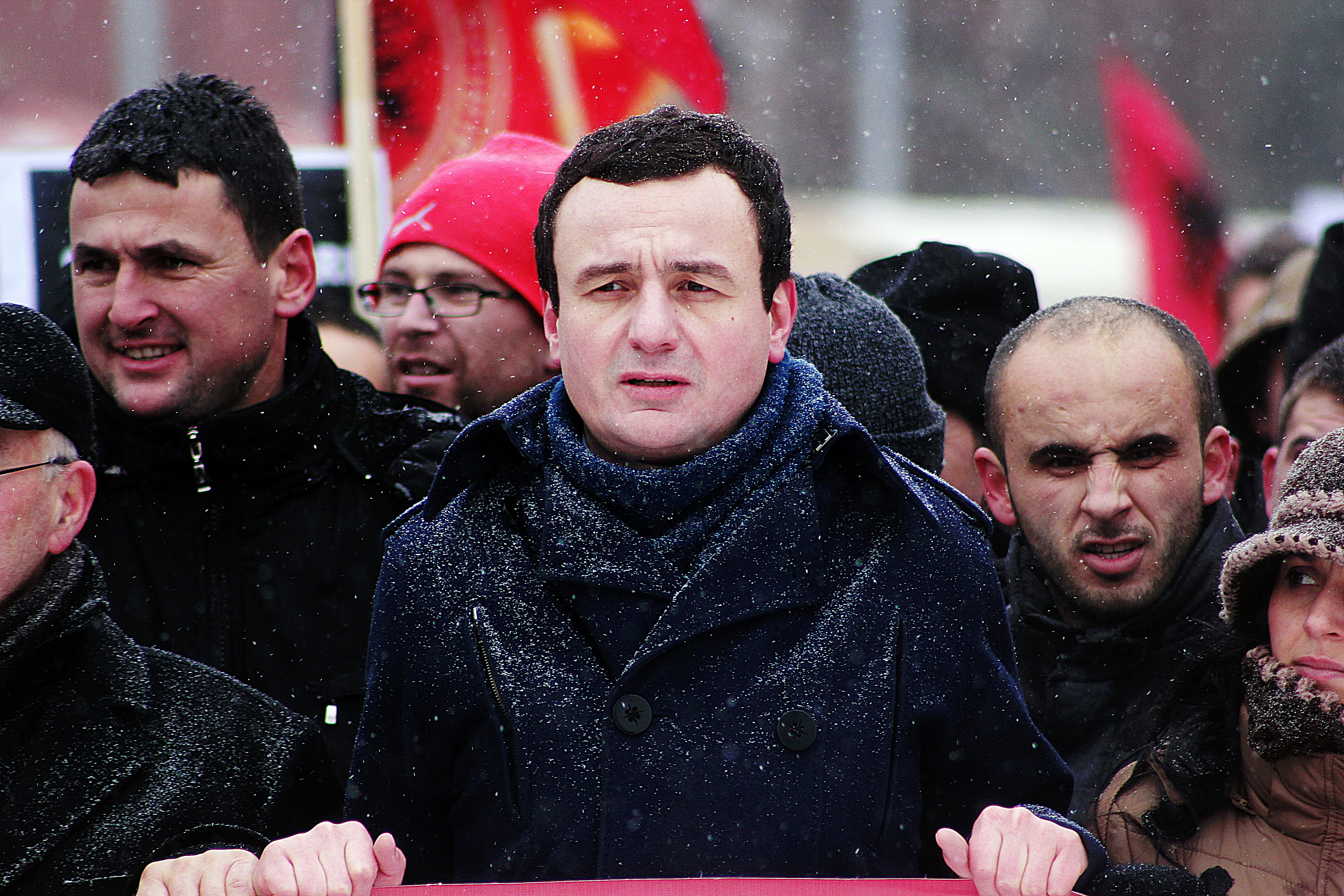
Albin Kurti in a Vetëvendosje demonstration, 2013

=== Vetëvendosje ===
On 12 June 2005 AKN activists wrote the slogan "No negotiations, Self-Determination" on the walls of UNMIK buildings. The police, with the help of UN Police, arrested, jailed, and convicted hundreds of activists, including Kurti. AKN then changed its name to the Self-Determination Movement (Vetëvendosje). Vetëvendosje demanded a referendum on the status of Kosovo, stating "only with a referendum as a use of international right for self-determination, can we realise a democratic solution for Kosovo, instead of negotiations which compromise freedom".

In February 2007 Vetëvendosje organised a protest against the Ahtisaari Plan, which according to them divided Kosovo along ethnic lines and did not give the people of Kosovo what they were striving for. The protest turned violent and the Romanian UN Police killed two unarmed protesters and injured 80 others with plastic and rubber bullets. Kurti was arrested. He was detained until July 2007 and then kept under house arrest. Amnesty International criticised the irregularities in his prosecution. He was eventually sentenced to nine months. Kurti was an advocate of "active nonviolent resistance".

Vetëvendosje joined the political spectrum of Kosovo by running in the elections of 2010 for the first time. Albin Kurti was the candidate for prime minister, though Vetëvendosje only scored 12.69% and won 14 out of 120 seats in the assembly, becoming the third political force in the country. Vetëvendosje criticised the Brussels Agreement between Kosovo and Serbia. The Vetëvendosje MPs, including Kurti, were escorted out of the parliament by police for disrupting the session of the assembly.

Kurti ran for prime minister again in the following elections in 2014, but Vetëvendosje was third again, only gaining 16 seats. Vetëvendosje and Kurti personally were involved in the protests within the parliament that earned international attention by setting off tear gas in the parliament on multiple cases.

In the 2017 election Vetëvendosje doubled in size, becoming the biggest political party in Kosovo and winning 32 seats (the most as an individual party compared to other parties in that election); his party took 200.135 votes (27,49%). They were still defeated by the big PANA coalition that took 245.627 (33,74%). Albin Kurti became the most-voted politician in Kosovo. During this term, Kurti was the leader of the opposition and Vetëvendosje managed to put strong pressure on the government in co-ordination with the other opposition party, LDK. On 3 January 2018, Kurti was sentenced to 1 year and 6 months in prison on probation for his role in setting off the tear-gas in 2015.

Prime Minister Ramush Haradinaj resigned in July 2019, taking Kosovo to early elections in October 2019. In the elections that followed, Kurti's Vetëvendosje won the largest share of the electorate with 221.001 (26,27% or 29 seats) and remained the primary political force in Kosovo, with Kurti's share of votes increasing further in comparison to 2017. He became Prime Minister of Kosovo in early February 2020.

Following the 2019 Albania earthquake, Kurti visited Durrës to survey the damage and stressed the importance for institutional co-operation between both Kosovo and Albania.

On 18 March 2020, Kurti sacked Interior Minister Agim Veliu (LDK) due to his support for declaring a state of emergency to handle the coronavirus pandemic, which would have given power to the Kosovo Security Council chaired by Hashim Thaçi (PDK). The Democratic League of Kosovo, the junior partner leader of the coalition, filed a no-confidence vote motion in retaliation for the sacking, and on 25 March 82 members of the Kosovo Assembly voted in favour of the motion, and Kurti's cabinet becoming the first government to be voted out of power due to disagreements regarding the coronavirus pandemic.

The Kurti cabinet continued as a caretaker government, until 3 June 2020, when Avdullah Hoti was elected as the next Prime Minister.

On 26 January 2021, Kurti was barred from running in the 2021 Kosovan parliamentary election by Kosovo's election complaints panel, as he had been convicted of a crime less than three years prior to the election. In spite of this, the party went on to win by a landslide with 50.28% of the vote.

Kurti's party won a plurality of seats following the February 2025 parliamentary election, leading to political deadlock in the Assembly. Another election was held in December 2025, where his Vetëvendosje won a third term by winning more seats.

Despite his party winning the December 2025 parliamentary election with 51.10% of the vote, he was unable to reach an political agreement with opposition parties on the election of a new President of Kosovo. Because the Assembly of Kosovo failed to elect a president within the constitutional deadline, the Assembly was dissolved, leading to the calling of new parliamentary elections.

In October 2026, the Vetëvendosje Movement and the Democratic Party of Kosovo managed to break the political deadlock in Kosovo by reaching a compromise on the appointment of the president. They selected Justina Shiroka Pula as the compromise candidate for the presidency. Both parties considered her a suitable, non-partisan choice, given her extensive academic career as well as her experience in politics. Following the agreement, elections were averted, and Kurti secured his four-year governing mandate for the second time.

== Premiership ==
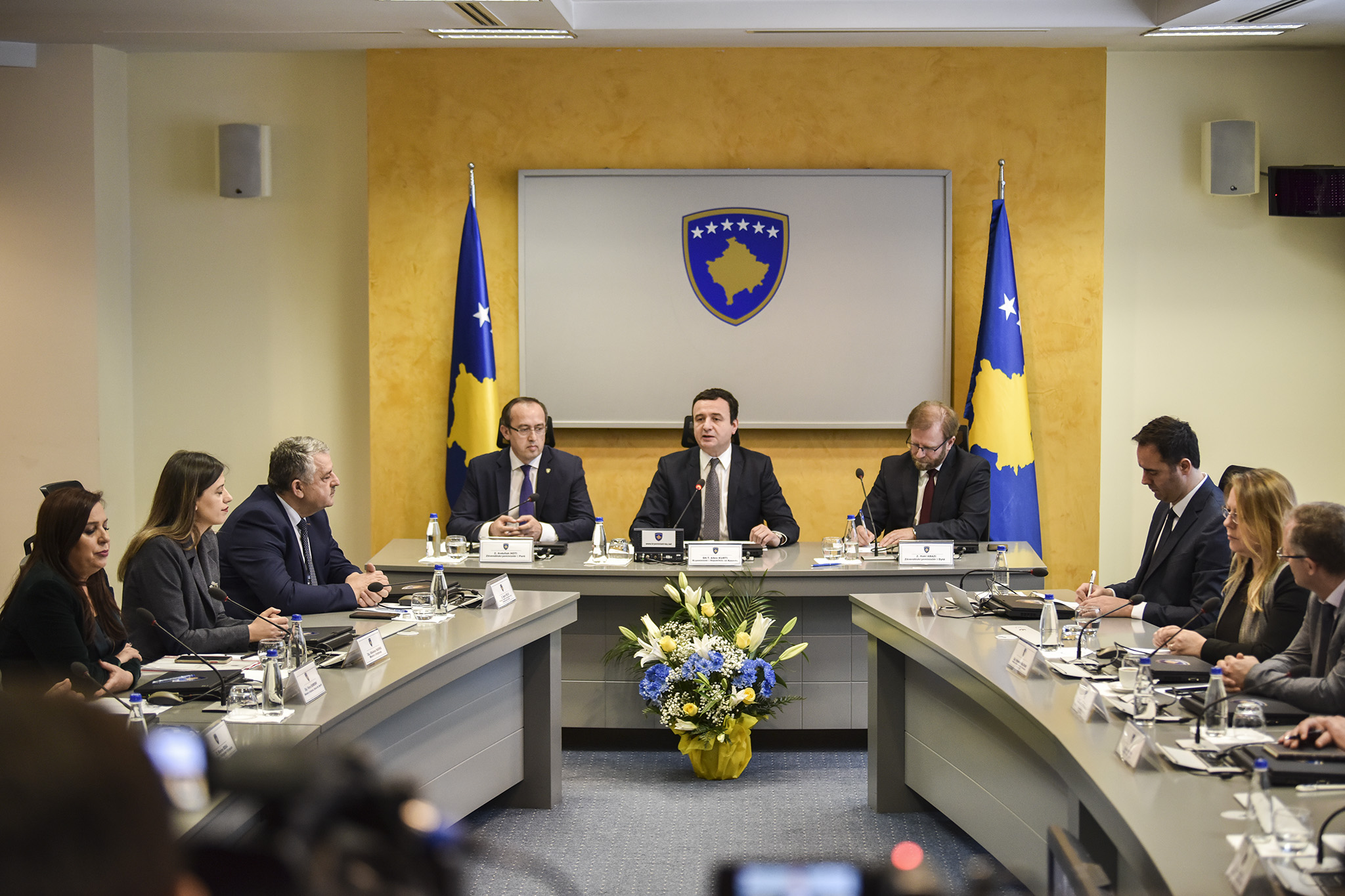
First Kurti cabinet

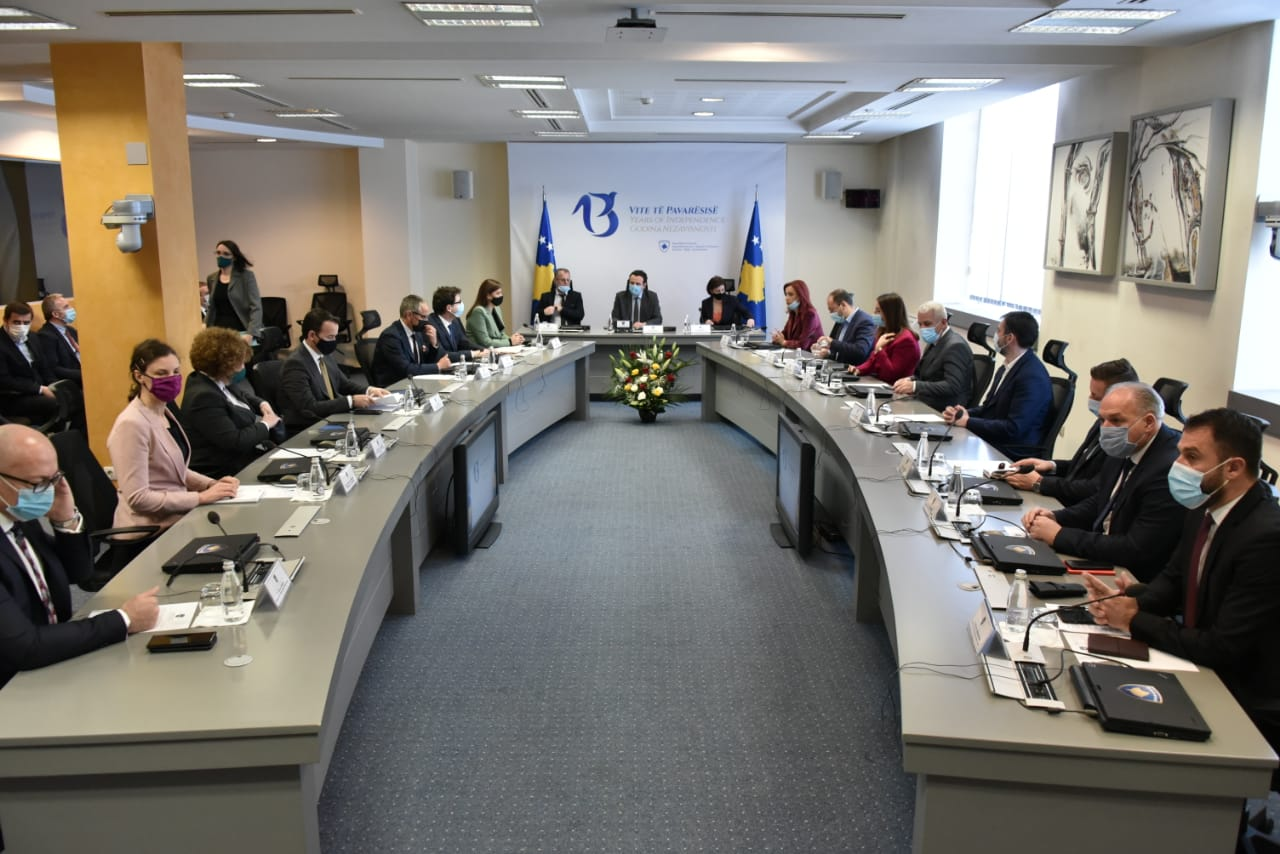
Second Kurti cabinet

On 3 February 2020, Albin Kurti was elected Prime Minister of Kosovo with 66 votes in favour and 10 abstains, 34 opposition MPs boycotted the vote and left the Kosovo assembly building.

One of the first decisions by Kurti and his cabinet was to repeal the unpopular pay raise awarded to ministers by the preceding Haradinaj government and return salaries to their previous amount. As a result, the Prime Minister's monthly wage set at €2,950 will return to €1,500 for Kurti.

As part of his government's policy platform, Kurti seeks to introduce a three-month period of military conscription service in Kosovo, viewing it important to the country's defence.

Kurti was elected Prime Minister of Kosovo for a second time on 22 March 2021 with 67 members of the assembly voting in favour and 30 members against.

=== Policies ===
==== Economy ====
According to the 2024 report by the International Monetary Fund (IMF), Kosovo's economy remained "resilient" during Kurti's term, recording real GDP growth of 3.3% in 2023 and a projected 3.8% in 2024. The Swiss Federal Department for Foreign Affairs' economic report noted that, although the GDP growth had slowed down from 4.3% in 2022 largely due to weaker net exports, increased public investment and a further rise in remittances (14% of GDP) provided "positive momentum". After peaking at 11.6% in 2022, inflation averaged 4.9% in 2023. To mitigate the impact of high costs, Kurti's government introduced a fiscal support package worth 4.3% of GDP, including energy subsidies and price controls on petroleum products. Revenues grew by 9% to €2.86 billion (29.6% of GDP), while capital expenditures expanded by 40.8%. As a result, Kosovo recorded the strongest pace of fiscal consolidation among the emerging European economies, reducing the deficit to 0.2% of GDP and public debt to 17.5% of GDP, the lowest level in the Western Balkans. Under Kurti's administration, ICT services exports grew by nearly 36%, travel services grew by 17.7% and the agriculture sector grew by 3.3% in 2023.

Inflation decelerated further to 2% year-on-year in early 2024, while Kurti's fiscal policy was described as "prudent". The IMF noted that all program targets and structural reforms under Kosovo's Stand-By Arrangement were met, including improvements in tax compliance, public investment management and financial sector governance. Kosovo also received its first sovereign credit rating in 2023.

According to the IMF's 2025 report and the World Bank's 2025 report, Kosovo's economy actually grew by 4.4% in 2024, which was higher than the projected growth given a year earlier. Growth in 2025 was projected at 4% by the IMF and 3.8% by the World Bank, while inflation fell to 1.6% in 2024 before stabilising at around 2%. The fiscal deficit and public debt remained low due to the government's economic policies, supported by higher tax revenues and improved fiscal management.

In March 2025, Kosovo became an official donor to the World Bank's International Development Association (IDA) with a $1.4 million contribution, joining the community of 78 countries that both borrow from and contribute to the fund. This contribution was made possible by Kosovo's steady economic progress since its independence.

In September 2026, Kosovo’s annual inflation rate reached 7.8%, the highest since 2023.

==== Energy ====
In 2021, Kurti's government faced Kosovo's biggest energy crisis since 2010, leading to the declaration of a 60-day state of emergency for electricity supply on 24 December. In July 2022, the United States granted Kosovo 236 million dollars for an energy project that would reinforce Kosovo's energy reserves through high capacity batteries of 170 megawatts (MWh), which would provide about 340 MWh of reserves.

In 2023, the government signed a €56 million agreement to modernise turbines at TC Kosova B, extending its lifetime and adding 30 MWh of production capacity without raising emissions and reducing the need for constant repairs. That same year, Kurti announced a 950 MWh renewable investment package, including plans for a 150 MWh wind farm and a 100 MWh solar farm. Climate-related damages in 2023 cost the state €28.9 million and affected 21,500 people, prompting commitments from Kurti's government to cut greenhouse-gas emissions by 36% by 2030.

However, one of the most controversial aspects of the Kurti's administrations on the energy sector was the opposition of the Kosova e Re power plant project, a major coal-fired power station, whose plan was first presented in 2009 in order to address Kosovo's energy needs in the long term. The Kosova e Re project had been negotiated by the previous government under former Prime Minister Ramush Haradinaj with the British company, ContourGlobal, and would have been the largest foreign direct investment in Kosovo's history. It also announced by ContourGlobal that the power plant would create around 10,000 jobs during the construction phase and greatly improve the air quality by reducing the harmful emissions coming from the old coal-fired power plants into the atmosphere. In March 2020, one month after the formation of the government under Kurti's leadership, ContourGlobal announced the abandonment of the Kosova e Re project, citing a lack of political support. While this was praised by environmental groups and civil society groups fearing a raise of energy bills by up to 50 percent, energy analysts criticised the cancellation, arguing that it eliminated an important future source of electrical energy capacity and increased Kosovo's dependence on electrical energy imports. In addition, the government of Kosovo also lost the arbitration case to ContourGlobal over the cancelled project and was ordered to pay compensation for the cancellation of over 20 million euros.

Despite the cancellation of the Kosova e Re project, electricity prices still rose during Kurti's administration. In April 2025, Kosovo experienced a 16.1% increase in electricity tariffs as it is forced to import more power to meet domestic demand. Prior to this general rise, households consuming over 800 kWh per month, had already faced a sharp increase, with tariffs above this threshold being raised by approximately 103 percent.

In 2024, at the Summit on the Green Agenda for the Western Balkans, Kurti announced that his government's comprehensive energy strategy was aimed towards making Kosovo carbon neutral by 2050, and that this strategy was supported by the government's recent laws on climate change and renewable energy sources. However, substantial investments would be required for energy transition, waste management and transport decarbonisation. In that same year, the International Monetary Fund (IMF) noted that Kosovo's Resilience and Sustainability Facility (RSF) has supported the government's green agenda, including the first competitive auctions for solar and wind generation, as well as preparations for carbon pricing and measures to enhance energy efficiency, air quality and energy security. Additionally, in January 2025, Kurti announced the launch of battery-based energy storage systems – 125 MWh under the Kosovo Energy Corporation and 45 MWh under KOSTT. These facilities, to be built in Ferizaj and Istog, would stabilise the power grid, reduce import costs, improve supply reliability and enable greater integration of renewable sources.

==== Justice reforms and corruption ====
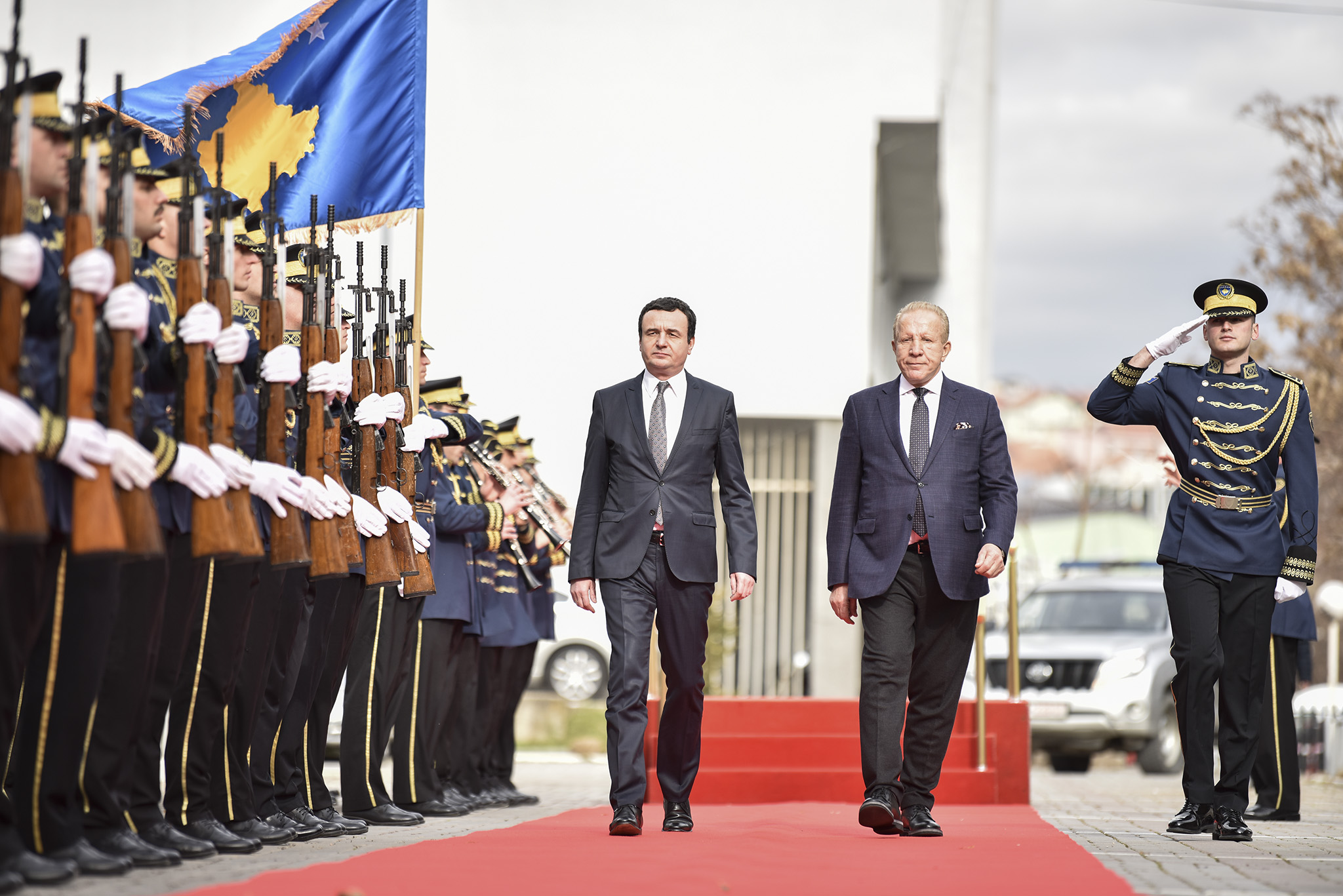
Kurti and outgoing Deputy Prime Minister Behgjet Pacolli during the handover ceremony of Government, 4 February 2020

During the 2021 election campaign, Kurti had promised vetting and the reform of the justice system. After his victory in the elections, the Kurti government brought the file on vetting and justice reform to the Assembly of Kosovo on 4 September 2022. In 2023, the Assembly of Kosovo approved Kurti's Law on the State Bureau for the Verification and Confiscation of Unjustified Assets, following a positive opinion from the Venice Commission in 2022. The law foresaw that public officials, their family members and related third parties may have their assets reviewed, and in cases where a discrepancy of more than €25,000 is found between legal income and property, the Bureau can refer cases to the courts for confiscation. The Bureau was to be led by a director elected by the assembly for a five-year term, with confiscated assets to be managed by the Agency for the Administration of Seized or Confiscated Property. While the law was supported by the Democratic League of Kosovo (LDK), the Democratic Party of Kosovo (PDK) announced it would challenge it and send it to the Constitutional Court.

As Prime Minister, Kurti reformed Kosovo's Agency for Prevention of Corruption (APK), which has now provided the Ministry of Justice with the means to investigate corruption and prosecute criminals. Since Kurti first became Prime Minister, Kosovo's Corruption Perceptions Index (CPI) score has progressively increased from 36 in 2020 to 44 in 2024, meaning that corruption has declined during his term, and Kosovo currently ranks as the 73rd least corrupt country in the world. According to a survey carried out by the GAP Institute in 2023, 62% of Kosovo's citizens believe that corruption has decreased since Kurti came to power.

According to a 2024 analysis by the Group for Legal and Political Studies (GLPS), Kurti's second government demonstrated stronger political will to tackle corruption than previous administrations, and introduced numerous reforms to this end. It also promoted greater transparency through digitalisation of procurement and administrative processes. However, GLPS noted that progress has been slow, with implementation hampered by institutional resistance, weak enforcement capacities and political obstacles, particularly in the judiciary. According to the GLPS, while Kurti has set an ambitious anti-corruption agenda, its impact has been limited, reflecting both the constraints of Kosovo's institutions and the lack of broad parliamentary consensus necessary to push through deeper reforms.

In June 2024, the OSCE published a trial-monitoring report on organised crime and corruption cases in Kosovo, based on 52 cases and 670 hearings held between July 2021 and March 2024. The report acknowledged several positive developments under Kurti's government, including the adoption of the 2021–2026 Strategy on Rule of Law, the 2022–2024 Strategic Plan for the Effective Solution of Cases of Corruption and Organised Crime, and the March 2023 signing of a Joint Statement of Commitment by key stakeholders. At the same time, it highlighted persistent problems, such as high acquittal rates, delays, poor case management and inconsistent judicial practices. Minister of Justice Albulena Haxhiu stated at the report's launch that the government had completed the anti-corruption legal package, approved the Law on the State Bureau for the Verification and Confiscation of Assets and established new regulations on whistleblower protection, while also preparing an anti-corruption task force and joint investigation team. The OSCE report concluded that while the government has advanced the legal framework, the judiciary still faces serious challenges in effectively adjudicating high-level corruption cases.

In early 2025, Kurti repeatedly ignored summons from the Special Prosecution in Pristina to testify as a witness in a case concerning the alleged misuse of €600,000 worth of state reserves by other politicians, of which Kurti was not personally involved in. While prosecutors insisted he appear in person, Kurti stated that he was willing to testify only from his office, accusing the prosecution of politicisation and stated that, if his testimony was that important, the prosecution would have approached him at his office. Kurti believed that the Special Prosecution was, in his words, more interested in filling the front pages of news articles rather than actually bringing about justice.

==== Social reforms ====
Kurti has doubled Kosovo's minimum wage since he first took office. After remaining unchanged for 13 years, Kosovo's minimum wage was raised to €350 gross per month, effective from 1 October 2024 onwards. Until then, Kosovo had the lowest minimum wage in the Balkans, set at €130 for workers under 35 and €170 for those over 35. The increase was enabled by a new law adopted in July 2023 and upheld by the Constitutional Court in June 2024, which allowed the government to set the minimum wage without mandatory consultation with social partners. The government initially proposed an increase to €264 in 2022, but that proposal was blocked for more than one year by the opposition and was then sent to the Constitutional Court, where it was delayed for another 11 months. Kurti's government considered that amount to be inadequate considering the time lapsed, and subsequently decided on €350. The Ministry of Finance estimated that the rise would benefit around 150,000 workers, particularly in the private sector and low-wage sectors such as gastronomy and construction, while the GAP Institute calculated that employers would collectively pay an additional €12 million monthly. Tax rates were also changed alongside the increase in minimum wage; previously, monthly incomes from €80 onwards were taxed, but Kurti's new law legislated that no tax would be imposed on monthly salaries of up to €250. The tax rate for salaries ranging from €251 to €450 is now 8 per cent, whilst for salaries over €450, it is 10 percent.

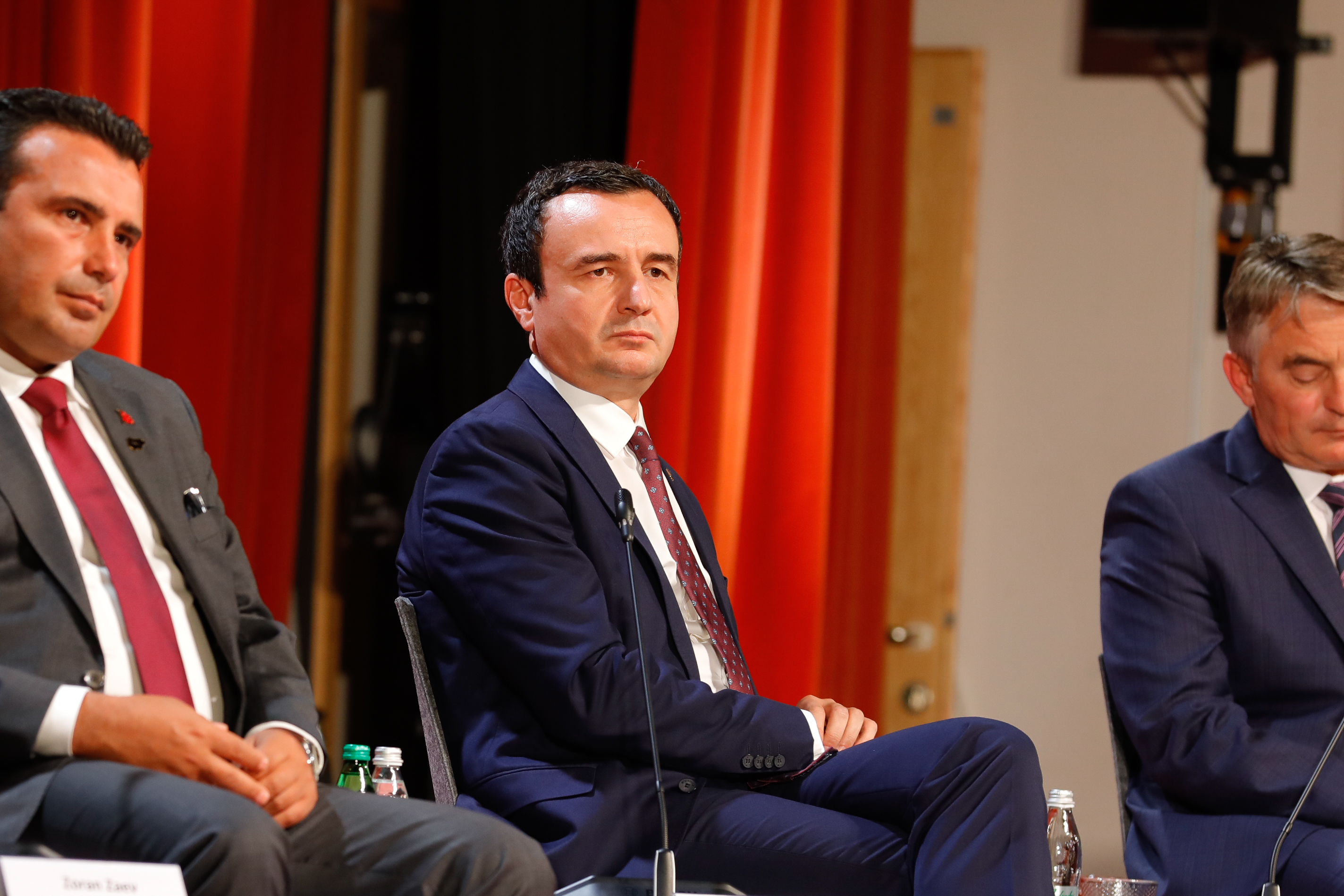
Zoran Zaev, Kurti and Željko Komšić at the Bled Strategic Forum, 1 September 2021

In September 2021, around six months after taking office, Kurti's government introduced Kosovo's first universal child benefit and extended maternity support to unemployed women. Under the scheme, all children aged 0–2 became entitled to €20 per month, while a phased plan gradually expanded a €10 benefit to children aged 2–16, reaching those aged 2–7 as early as November 2021. By that point, 68% of eligible infants and 58% of children aged 2–7 were already receiving payments. Unemployed mothers became eligible for six months of maternity benefits at €170 per month, equivalent to the minimum wage, though the requirement of at least one year of prior unemployment drew some criticism. Although critics raised concerns about potential "productivist" goals and risks of incentivising long-term unemployment, the measures were widely regarded as a significant improvement in Kosovo's social protection system, particularly for lower-income households. In 2024, the government increased the universal child benefit. Each child would now benefit from €20 per month until the age of 16, whereas if a family has 3 children or more, they will benefit from €30 a month for each child.

In May 2024, Kurti's government launched a pilot of a reformed social assistance scheme, developed with support from the World Bank. The new program replaces the old model, which had excluded families once their children turned five or if any member earned even minimal income. Under the reform, eligibility is based on a poverty test, ensuring support for households with less than €100 per member per month, while also introducing incentives for beneficiaries to seek formal employment. Alongside this, the government reported that since the beginning of their term in 2021, over 400,000 children and 55,000 mothers had benefited from child and maternity allowances, around 100,000 women opened bank accounts for the first time, and over €100 million had been allocated to support pensioners and vulnerable families, including subsidies for electricity bills for more than 60,000 households.

In October 2024, Kurti's government raised all pensions by 20%, covering more than 300,000 beneficiaries. This included raising the basic social pension from €100 to €120, contributory pensions ranging from €182–€265 to €218–€318 depending on category, and targeted increases for blind and paraplegic/tetraplegic beneficiaries. A further 20% rise for war-related categories was scheduled for January 2025.

In late 2024, Kurti's government adopted the 2025–2030 Health Sector Strategy, which was formally approved in February 2025, which pledged universal and equal access to healthcare for Kosovo's citizens. This was also packaged with a new health security action plan, developed with WHO and co-financed by the EU, which sets out long-term measures for public health emergency preparedness and response.

==== Organised crime ====
Kurti has stated that they have made progress in the fight against organised crime during his first two years in power, from 2021 to 2023. According to the figures published by the government, Kosovo Police have arrested over 3800 people for serious criminal offences, including over 300 public officials. 16 drug laboratories have been broken up, nine of them in North Mitrovica. In co-operation with Montenegro and North Macedonia, illegal roads have been closed along the respective borders. 24 illegal roads have also been closed in North Mitrovica which were used for smuggling, trafficking and illegal border crossing by organised crime structures.

==== Kosovo Security Force ====
The Kurti government has increased the budget for the Ministry of Defence. In 2017, the budget for the Kosovo Security Force was 51 million euros.

In 2022, the budget increased to 102 million euros and in 2023, it increased to 123 million. 153 million euros have been allocated for 2024. The Security Force has purchased six drones from Turkey, known as Bayraktar, and has concluded several other agreements for the purchase of armaments. New recruits have also been added to the Kosovo Security Force, increasing the number of soldiers.

The U.S. government approved a potential sale of hundreds of Javelin anti-tank missiles to Kosovo for an estimated cost of $75 million. Kosovo has requested to buy 246 Javelin missiles and 24 lightweight command launch units, among other items. Meanwhile, Serbia says it is disappointed with possible US sale of anti-tank missiles to Kosovo. President Aleksandar Vučić, said that Kosovo should not have an army because this violates international law. Serbia continues to consider that Kosovo is part of its territory.

On 27 November 2024, Prime Minister Kurti signed the decision to initiate procedures for the establishment of the defence industry of the Republic of Kosovo. Later, on 16 December 2024, Kurti announced that he had signed an agreement with the state-owned Turkish defence industry producer MKEK for the operation of a factory in Kosovo for the production of ammunition and unmanned aerial vehicles.

=== Foreign policy ===
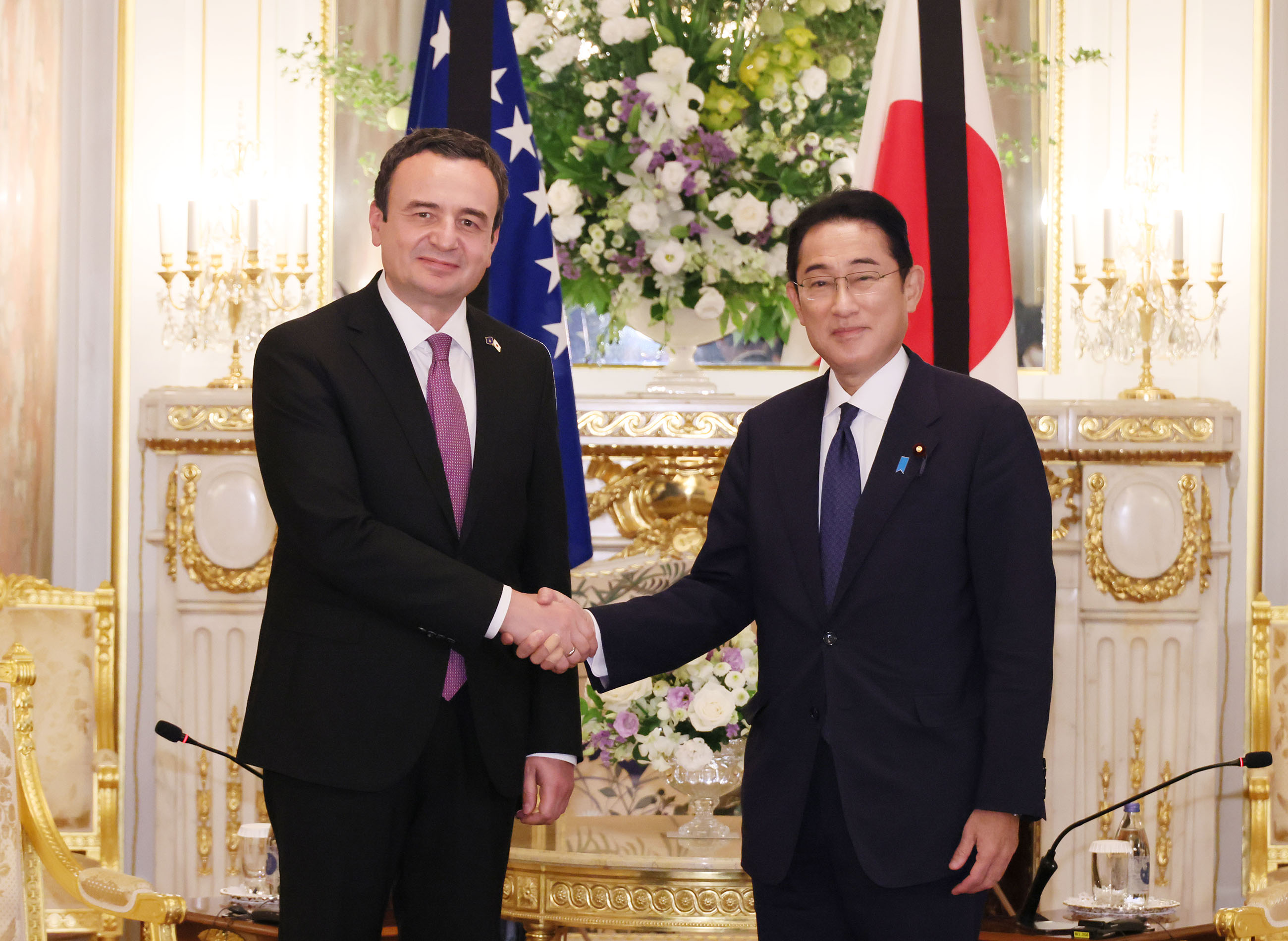
Kurti with Japanese Prime Minister Fumio Kishida on 28 September 2022

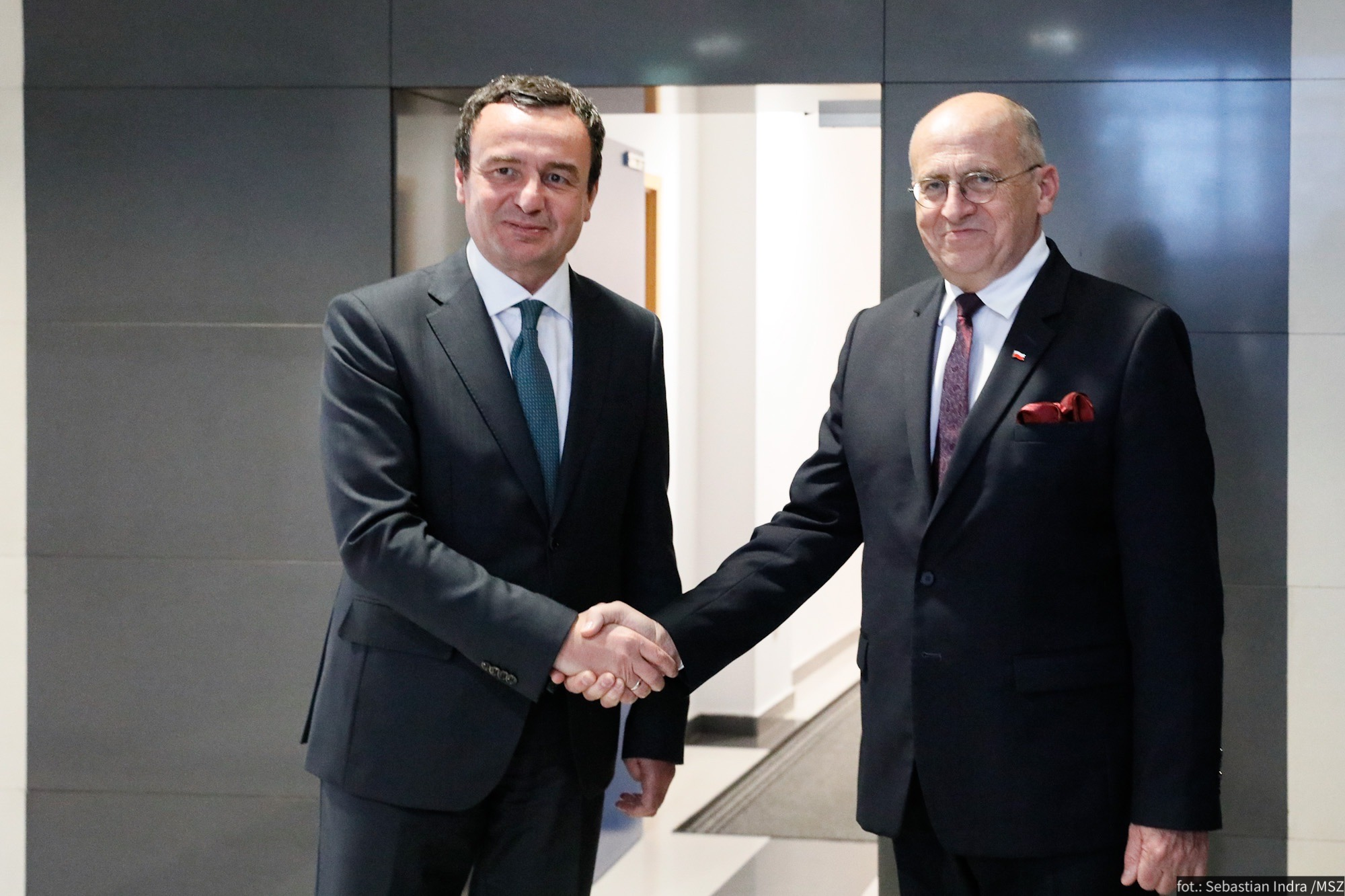
Kurti with Polish Foreign Minister Zbigniew Rau on 15 July 2022

==== Relations with Albania ====
Kurti had opposed the "Open Balkan" project which consisted of the three countries Albania, Serbia and North Macedonia. Kurti had estimated that Serbia was the largest regional producer and opening borders for their goods would harm the economy of Albania and Kosovo.

During a visit to Tirana in 2020, Kurti held a press conference with Albanian Prime Minister Edi Rama where he argued that the economic project should be based on the interest of the Albanians and that it was necessary to increase commercial co-operation between Albania and Kosovo. Rama opposed Kurti, saying that opening the borders was in the interest of the region.

The European Union has held a neutral stance regarding the initiative. They have stated that the initiative would be successful if other countries such as Kosovo, Montenegro and Bosnia and Herzegovina were also integrated.

In June 2023, Rama announced that his country had withdrawn from this initiative because "Open Balkan" had fulfilled its mission and that it was time to focus on the processes for integration into the European Union.

The Serbian government were surprised by the decision, with Serbian Prime Minister Ana Brnabić stating that she would talk with the Albanian Prime Minister, adding that she did not think that the "Open Balkans" project was dead because, according to her, this initiative was in the best interests of their nations.

===== Unification of Kosovo and Albania =====
Albin Kurti is a strong supporter of direct-democracy and he has often criticised the Constitution of Kosovo for not allowing direct referendums. One topic that he has stated should be decided on through a referendum is the potential unification of Kosovo and Albania. Kurti has continuously criticised the third article of the constitution for not allowing the referendum to happen. In a rally with Vetëvendosje supporters in 2018, Kurti stated that "We want to have the right of Kosovo to join Albania, but we would not start the third Balkan war for this goal." Following the 2019 election and LVV's electoral success, Kurti stated that Kosovo Albanians were not after territorial and political unification with Albania but instead seek "integration with Albania and the EU, through the success of Kosovo as a state." Kurti has however stated that if a referendum would be held on possible unification, he would vote in favour of it.

==== Relations with Serbia ====
Kurti has claimed that Serbia is threatening Kosovo's security because it has allegedly built 48 military bases along the border with Kosovo. The government of Kosovo has requested that the United States turn Camp Bondsteel, where KFOR troops are stationed, into a permanent American base.

In June 2023, the Government of Kosovo declared the "Civil Defence" and "North Brigade" organisations as terrorist organisations as they allege that they have been responsible for attacks against Kosovo Police and KFOR members in North Mitrovica and have support from the state of Serbia. Kosovo's allies have stated that the Government did not consult with them before taking this decision.

On 24 September 2023, a group of armed Serbs attacked the Kosovo Police in the village of Banjska, Zvečan, killing a Kosovo policeman. The Kosovo police killed three of the attackers, while the rest of the group managed to escape and enter Serbia. The European Union described the attack on the Kosovo Police as a terrorist attack and asked that Serbia bring the perpetrators who were in Serbia to justice. The United States has also requested that Serbia extradite the alleged mastermind of the incident, Milan Radoičić, to Kosovo. Serbian Aleksandar Vučić, stated the justice system in Serbia will deal with Milan Radoičić and that he would not be extradited to Kosovo as Serbia does not recognise Kosovo as an independent state.

Kurti has accused Russia of encouraging attacks by Serbs against institutions in Kosovo with the aim of destabilising the region.

While he was a member of the political opposition, Kurti was known for his strong opinions on the dialogue between the governments of Kosovo and Serbia. He has criticised Kosovo's stance in its negotiations with Serbia, saying that dialogue should be based on conditions and reciprocity. He had further criticised the government for not conditioning the dialogue with Serbia on a return of the bodies of missing persons from the Kosovo War buried in mass graves in Serbia, Serbia paying war reparations to Kosovo, along with the return of allegedly stolen pension funds and artifacts.

Following the 2019 election, Kurti said that "solid dialogue" and "reciprocity" were needed in the process of normalising relations with Serbia. Kurti stated that Kosovo needed first to negotiate with its Serb minority and the European Union before negotiating with Serbia. He considers future dialogue with Kosovo's minorities and the EU "a top priority".

During his second term as prime minister in 2023, Kurti participated in a series of talks mediated by the European Union with Serbian President Aleksandar Vučić, leading to the Ohrid Agreement. Based on Kurti's policy of reciprocity in dialogue with Serbia, the agreement obliges both parties to recognise the national symbols and official documents of the other party (among other clauses). However, it stops short of mandating the formal recognition of Kosovo as a sovereign state. The implementation framework for this accord is still pending.

In 2023 the European Union announced sanctions on Kosovo for what the bloc said was Albin Kurti government role in stoking ethnic tensions in northern Kosovo, which has a Serb majority, including restrictions on funding and participation.

==== Relations with the United States ====
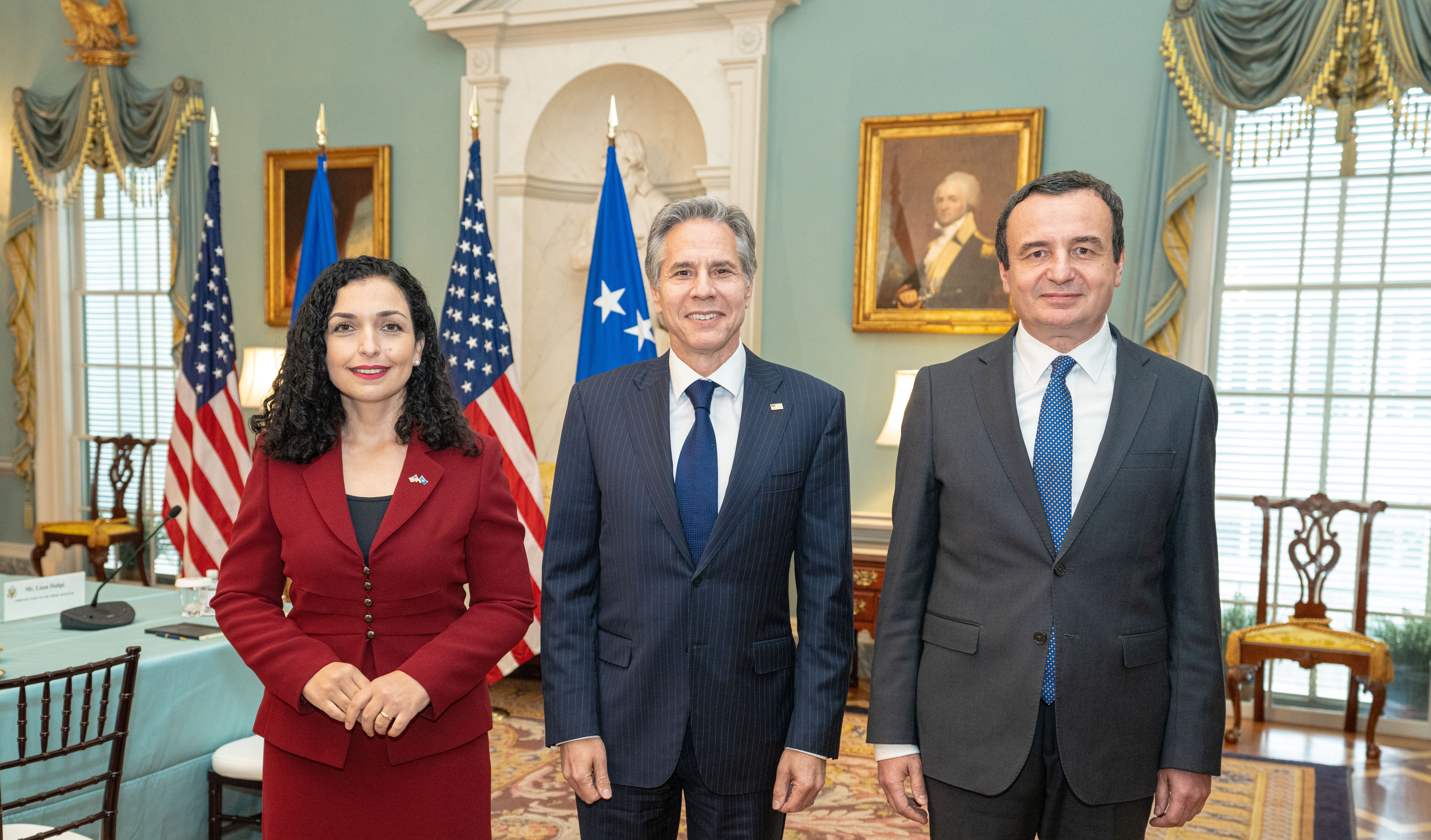
Kurti alongside U.S. Secretary of State Antony Blinken and Kosovo President Vjosa Osmani, 26 July 2022

During his first term as prime minister, Kurti had a poor relationship with Donald Trump and his administration. Kurti accused the special envoy sent by Trump, Richard Grenell, of discussing the Kosovo–Serbia land swap.

Kurti's opponent Hashim Thaçi had been supported by Grenell who demanded that Kosovo must unconditionally lift punitive tariffs imposed on imports from Serbia so that a "deal" he has championed, namely the establishment of direct rail and air connections between Kosovo and Serbia, could have been enforced as soon as possible. Kurti countered by saying that Kosovo could only lift the tariffs if Serbia, for its part, also abolished trade restrictions.

In October 2020, Kurti endorsed the Democratic nominee Joe Biden for U.S. president.

The government of Kosovo had accepted the request of the US to shelter the refugees from Afghanistan in Kosovo. Kosovo has sheltered only Afghan citizens who were at risk due to their collaboration with the United States and NATO. An agreement between the United States and Kosovo allowed the U.S. to temporarily shelter a limited number of Afghan citizens whose applications (for visas in the US) required additional processing. About 700 refugees were sheltered in Camp Bondsteel, located in Ferizaj.

In early January 2026, Kurti publicly supported the U.S. military operation in Venezuela, led by President Donald Trump, which resulted in the capture of Nicolás Maduro.

==== Relations with Albanian political parties in North Macedonia ====
Albanian parties in Kosovo co-operate with Albanian political parties in Macedonia. The political class in Kosovo has continuously supported the Albanian party in Macedonia, the Democratic Union for Integration (BDI) led by Ali Ahmeti. Ahmeti was in the Government as a coalition partner with the Macedonian parties.

However, the new Government led by Albin Kurti informed the public that relations with Ali Ahmeti had deteriorated. Kurti was against the "Open Balkan" initiative, which included Serbia, North Macedonia and Albania. He had stated that the economic initiative was in favour of Serbia and harmed the economies of neighbouring countries. For this reason, he had disagreements with the chairman of DUI, Ali Ahmeti, who was part of the Government of North Macedonia.

He had accused Ali Ahmet of flirting with the idea of the president of Kosovo, Hashim Thaçi, about the possibility of exchanging territories between Serbia and Kosovo. Kurti was against the exchange of territories. In the 2024 elections in North Macedonia, an Albanian party known as "VLEN" was created within the Albanian population. Kurti met with the representatives of this political entity, giving them support in these elections. The leader of the Albanian political entity VLEN is Arben Taravari, who was also the mayor of the municipality of Gostivar.

The highest official of the Democratic Union for Integration, Bujar Osmani, accused Kurti of interfering in the elections with his actions, but according to him, these interventions will not have an impact on Albanian voters. Osmani had declared that they would win the mandates and would be part of the Government again.

==== Relations with Greece ====
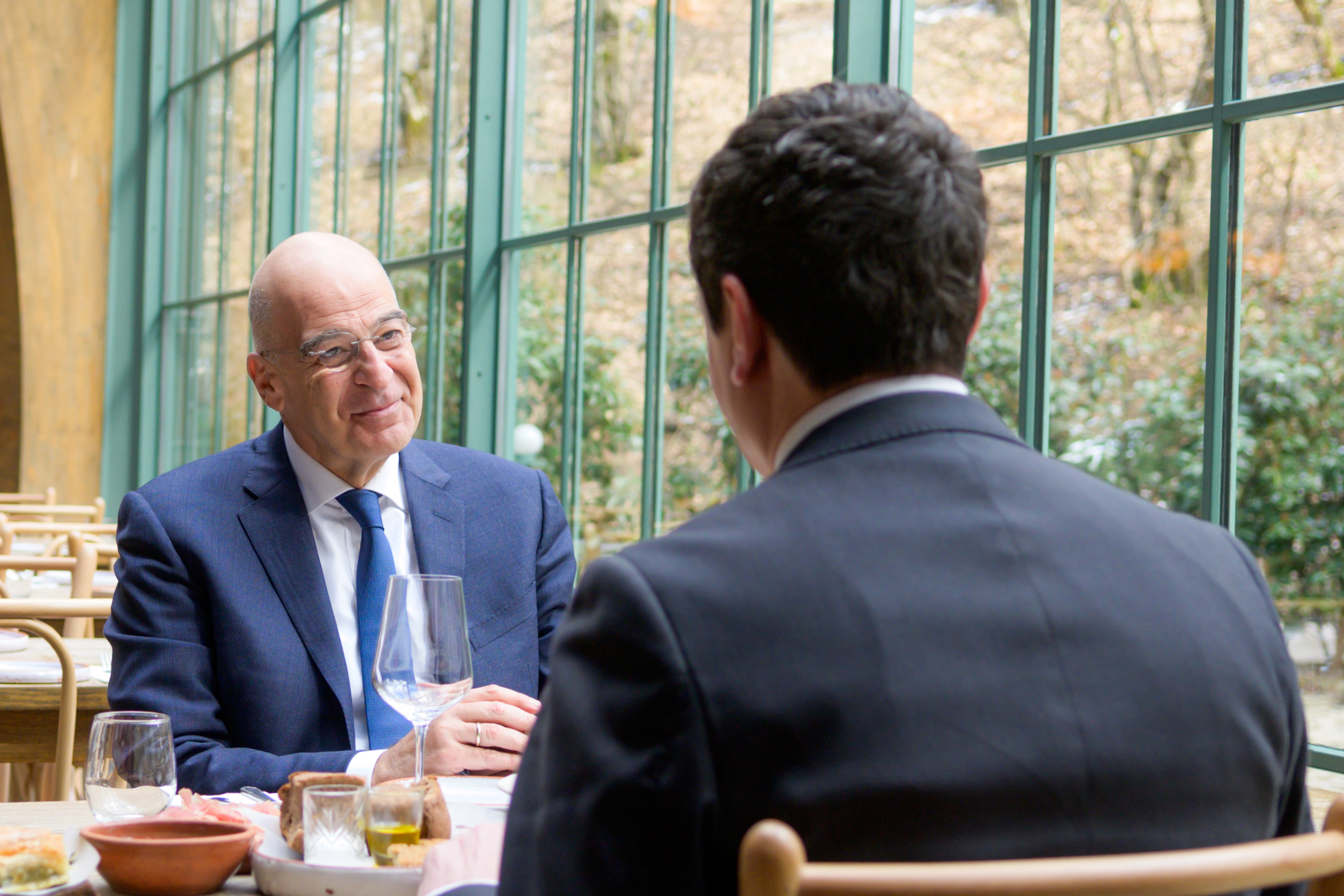
Kurti during a lunch meeting with Greek Foreign Minister Nikos Dendias, 12 March 2023

As Prime Minister of Kosovo, Albin Kurti, has visited the state of Greece several times, where he has also participated in various forums. Kurti participated in the "Delphi" economic forum in 2022. Also, the Foreign Minister of Greece, Nikos Dendias, visited Pristina where he met with Prime Minister Kurti where they also expressed their views regarding the co-operation between these countries.

The report assigned by the Council of Europe, Dora Bakoyannis, who is a Greek politician, prepared the report for Kosovo, where she underlined that Kosovo meets the conditions to be a member of the Council of Europe Her report was voted by the majority of votes in the Council of Europe, which provoked the reaction of Serbia. According to the Government of Serbia, Dora Bakoyannis had damaged the "fraternal" relations between Serbia and Greece with her recommendation that Kosovo become part of the Council of Europe.

The good relations with Kosovo has influenced Greece to increase the trade volume by exporting their goods to this country. According to the GAP institute, Greece has exported goods worth 330 million euros to Kosovo. Greece recognises the documents of the state of Kosovo and has its office in Pristina

==== Relations with the United Kingdom ====
In October 2025, Kurti announced that Kosovo would be willing to take in asylum seekers who had their applications rejected by the United Kingdom, in return for security guarantees from the UK government. This made Kosovo the first west-Balkan country to agree to such an arrangement with the United Kingdom, after similar plans had been rejected by Albanian and Bosnian governments.

==== Relations with Montenegro ====
On 1 September 2024, Kurti met with Boris Bojović, the disputed metropolitan of the non-canonical Montenegrin Orthodox Church. Together with several other notable figures, they discussed regional politics and Russian influence.

== EFTA Agreement ==
Kosovo signed an agreement with the European Free Trade Association (EFTA) on 22 January 2025, after negotiations that lasted more than two and a half years.

The removal of tariffs is one of the facilities that will be enjoyed by Kosovo companies that export or want to export to EFTA member countries, with which Kosovo has trade agreements.

EFTA members, in addition to Switzerland, also include Iceland, Liechtenstein and Norway. Bilateral trade between Kosovo and EFTA began in 2008, after the country's independence. Since then, it has been growing steadily, reaching its highest level in 2023: 176 million euros, according to data on the organisation's website.

Kosovo exports to EFTA countries mainly goods such as furniture, plastics, iron and steel, as well as wood products, while importing from them mainly vehicles, pharmaceutical products, tobacco and machinery.

== Controversies ==
=== Economic policies and cost of living ===
Kurti's administration faced criticism over increases in living costs and electricity prices. A November 2023 study by the United Nations Development Programme (UNDP), based on a survey of 1,500 households, found that the proportion of households spending at least €200 per month on groceries rose from 38.8% in 2021 to 59.5% in 2023. The study reported increased expenditure on essential needs and changes to household spending patterns in response to inflation. In April 2025, Kosovo's Energy Regulatory Office approved a 16.1% increase in regulated electricity tariffs, effective from 1 May. The European Commission subsequently attributed renewed inflationary pressures in 2025 partly to higher electricity and food prices. The government introduced energy subsidies and other assistance measures to mitigate the effects of price increases. According to the Kosovo Agency of Statistics, consumer prices in September 2026 were 7.8% higher than in September 2025.

=== Energy-sector corruption investigations ===
In April 2023, Nagip Krasniqi, the chief executive of the state-owned Kosovo Energy Corporation (KEK), was arrested on suspicion of abuse of official position. In December 2024, the Special Prosecution filed an indictment against Krasniqi and two other individuals, alleging that actions connected to KEK contracts between 2021 and 2023 had caused approximately €37 million in financial damage. The alleged offences included abuse of official position, disclosure of official secrets and assistance in abuse of office.

A separate investigation concerned Martin Berishaj, Kosovo's ambassador to Croatia, following reporting on financial transactions involving companies associated with the Slovenian electricity trader GEN-I. In June 2025, the Special Prosecution questioned Berishaj as a suspect in connection with alleged money laundering, tax evasion and failures in financial declarations. Media investigations had raised questions over transactions reportedly amounting to approximately €1.5 million. Berishaj and his legal representatives denied wrongdoing.

=== Prosecutorial independence and discontinued investigations ===
In July 2026, acting president Albulena Haxhiu, a member of Vetëvendosje, appointed Zejnulla Gashi as Chief State Prosecutor following his nomination by the Kosovo Prosecutorial Council. On 2 October, the Council removed Blerim Isufaj as chief prosecutor of the Special Prosecution Office at an extraordinary closed-door meeting and appointed Dren Paca acting chief prosecutor. The Council cited mismanagement, inadequate performance and failures in fulfilling official duties. Kurti had publicly criticized Isufaj earlier that year and called for a change in the prosecutorial leadership. The Kosovo Law Institute criticized the procedure used for Isufaj's removal as hurried and lacking transparency, and raised concerns about perceptions of political interference.

==== Discontinuation of investigations against Kurti's ministers following the removal of Isufaj as chief prosecutor ====
On 26 October 2026, the Special Prosecution discontinued investigations involving former agriculture minister Faton Peci and Vetëvendosje parliamentarian Fitore Pacolli concerning alleged irregularities in the award of agricultural grants. Because the decisions followed the change in prosecutorial leadership, their timing drew media and political scrutiny.

On 3 November, opposition parliamentarian Paris Guri announced that he had challenged the discontinuation of the Peci and Pacolli investigations. Isufaj also challenged his dismissal, but the Supreme Court rejected his appeal on procedural grounds on 27 October, without deciding the merits of the dismissal.

=== Constitutional Court rulings ===
Legislation adopted under the parliamentary majority supporting Kurti was the subject of several Constitutional Court judgments. In March 2023, the Court invalidated amendments to the Law on the Kosovo Prosecutorial Council, finding that provisions infringed constitutional requirements relating to prosecutorial independence and the separation of powers. In January 2024, it found several provisions of the Law on Salaries in the Public Sector unconstitutional. In January 2026, the Court annulled parliamentary decisions through which 13 laws had been adopted on 5 December 2024, including legislation concerning unjustified assets, compulsory health insurance and the Special Prosecution Office. The Court found that required parliamentary procedures had not been followed, including the prescribed interval between readings. According to a January 2026 analysis by Koha Ditore, 17 laws adopted during the 2021–2025 legislature had been invalidated in their entirety, while provisions of five other laws had been struck down.

== Personal life ==
Kurti is married to Norwegian researcher Rita Augestad Knudsen and they have a daughter together. He speaks Albanian, Serbian and English. Besides his Kosovo citizenship, Kurti also holds Albanian citizenship and has voted in Albanian elections. Kurti's wife and daughter reside in Norway rather than Kosovo.

== Notes and references ==
=== References ===
Political offices
Preceded by Ramush Haradinaj	Prime Minister of Kosovo; 2020	Succeeded by Avdullah Hoti
Preceded by Avdullah Hoti	Prime Minister of Kosovo; 2021–present	Incumbent
