= Theranda (disambiguation) =

Theranda is an old Roman settlement in Kosovo.

Theranda may also refer to:

== Places ==
=== Kosovo ===
- Therandë, alternate name of Suva Reka

=== Albania ===
- Tirana was called by this name in antiquity, named after a castle called Theranda inside the city
