= Reçan, Suhareka =

Reçan: Reçan or Reqan (Albanian) Rečane or Речане (Serbian)
- Village
- Location in Kosovo
- Location: Kosovo
- District: Prizren
- Municipality: Suharekë

Population (2024)
  - Total: 732
- Time zone: UTC+1 (CET)
  - Summer (DST): UTC+2 (CEST)

Reçan (Serbian Cyrillic: Речане, Albanian: Reçan) is a settlement in the Suva Reka (Suhareka) municipality in Kosovo. The rural settlement lies 483 m above sea level in a cadastral area of the same name, covering 679 hectares. It has an ethnic Albanian majority. In the last census of the population, it had over 1,600 residents.

== History ==
Rečane is mentioned for the first time in the "Saint Archangels charter" (Svetoarhanđelska povelja) of Emperor Stephen Uroš IV Dušan, dating to 1348; Rečane was granted (metochion) to the Saint Archangels Monastery, the Emperor's foundation, in Prizren. The boundaries that were marked in detail at that time have remained their names unchanged to this day. It is believed that the Church of St. George, an endowment of an unknown voivode who was buried there in 1370, lied at the outskirts of the boundaries, which is testified on a tombstone in the church floor. In the mid-19th-century, the church was dilapidated, abandoned and the dome was half destroyed. Muslim shepherds wintered in it and held their goats, in the summer it was used as a restplace for cattle. At the beginning of the 20th century, it was partially restored. A little over half of the church's original paintings are preserved. Of the ten pieces from the series dedicated to the patron, St. George, six scenes have survived, which have a great iconographical and cultural importance. The first three scenes were made according to the Serbian translations of "The Life of St. George", while the lower zone is occupied by depictions of individual saints and the Adoration of the Lamb in the apse. On the south wall of the west aisle, in a series of standing figures, five female martyrs are depicted, and on the west wall four holy warriors. All inscriptions are in Slavic. The frescoes were painted in the 1360s, a work of two zographs of the Prizren School of painting. Between 1956 and 1960, there was conservation work carried out on the frescoes of the church.

Demographic history
Ethnic group	1948	1953	1961	1971	1981	1991
Albanians					730	
Serbs					188	
Total	363	421	524	706	896	1065
