= Popolan =

Popolan: Popolan (Albanian); Поповљане/Popovljane (Serbian)
- Village
- Location in Kosovo
- Location: Kosovo
- District: Prizren
- Municipality: Suharekë

Population (2024)
  - Total: 219
- Time zone: UTC+1 (CET)
  - Summer (DST): UTC+2 (CEST)

Popolan or Popovlanje (Serbian Cyrillic: Поповљане, Albanian: Popolan) is a settlement in the Suharekë/Therandë municipality in Kosovo. The rural settlement lies on a cadastral area with the same name, with 259 hectares. It lies 796 m above sea level. It has 274 inhabitants who are all Albanians.

The first mention of this village is from 1465. At the end of the 19th century, the Russian consul in Prizren mentioned this village and its rural church, which was inhabited by Serbs. The Russian consulate tried to prevent the violence by Albanians from a neighbouring village who did not allow the Popovljanians to have their Orthodox ceremonies in that church. In the Popovljane cemetery there is a Church dedicated to St. Nicholas, founded in 1626.

There is a primary school in the village.

Demographic history
Ethnic group	1948	1953	1961	1971	1981	1991
Serbs					236	
Albanians					6	
Total	290	331	385	330	242	161
