= Church of the Holy Apostles Peter and Paul, Suva Reka =

Serbian Orthodox church in Prizren, Kosovo

Coordinates: 42°21′41.5″N 20°49′51.5″E

Church of Holy Apostles Peter and Paul, Suva Reka Црква Светих Апостола Петра и Павла у Сувој Реци Kisha e Apostull Pjetrit dhe Palit

Religion
- Affiliation: Serbian Orthodox
- Year consecrated: 1938

Location
- Location: Suva Reka, Kosovo
- Interactive map of Church of Holy Apostles Peter and Paul, Suva Reka; Црква Светих Апостола Петра и Павла у Сувој Реци; Kisha e Apostull Pjetrit dhe Palit

Church of Holy Apostles Peter and Paul was a Serbian Orthodox church located in Suva Reka, Kosovo. The church was built in 1938, and it belonged to the Diocese of Raška and Prizren of the Serbian Orthodox Church.

Upon arrival of the German KFOR troops in the area of Suva Reka in June 1999, and when Albanians took over administration of the town, the church was vandalized and looted. In the early morning on 19 July 1999 the church was destroyed by powerful explosives. Local Albanians built a parking lot in the courtyard of the former church.
