= Foreign direct investment in Kosovo =

Economic activity

Foreign direct investments in Kosovo play an important role in the region's economy. However, this type of investment has historically been limited. Foreign sovereign investors in Kosovo primarily include regional European countries such as Germany, Turkey, Albania, Croatia, and North Macedonia. A majority of foreign investment is concentrated in Pristina, with particular focus in the areas of banking, construction, and transportation.

== Importance of investments in Kosovo ==
Although there are foreign investments in Kosovo, the current amounts are not sufficient to fully meet the region's economic needs. Kosovo faces a number of social and economic problems, including:

- Volatile political situation, which has made it difficult for Kosovo to borrow from international financial institutions
- Foreign financial assistance, known as donations for capital investment, have slowed since 2003
- Limited banking system in Kosovo that lacks the ability to issue long term debt to support serious investment
- Lack of financial and securities market
- Financial remittances from immigrants to their families are declining as more family members immigrate
- Poor public infrastructure
- High rate of unemployment

These facts suggest that Kosovo faces limited resource availability coupled with a poor infrastructure and high unemployment rate, estimated at 45-50%. The situation in the energy, telecommunications and transport sectors are also factors limiting development. Investment activity of private businesses in the postwar period has generated significant economic growth and employment, but overall the outlook remains negative in terms of declining average traffic volume for enterprise and employment growth. In these conditions, economic policy makers are challenged with the need to promote new investments. Foreign direct investment (FDI) alone can not accelerate appropriate activities. The goal should be to make FDI an important resource but complementary to other funding sources. Experience of economic development in recent decades, particularly when it comes to developing countries, has pointed out that private FDI is considered important because of their positive and multilateral effects.

== Investments in Kosovo ==
During the 90s, Kosovo benefited from global trends towards steady increase of investment. This growth has been significantly more stable and sustainable compared to other financial instruments (capital flows) in developing countries such as the international financial market, intergovernmental loans, bank loans, government funds and investment portfolios. FDI in developing countries increased from about $1 billion in 1990 to about US$12 billion in 1998.

Region	Investment in the region	Investment from the region
Latin America	71	15
Asia	85	36
Central and North Europe	19	2
Africa	8	0.5
North America	193	110
West Europe	237	406

From the table above, it is clear that the biggest beneficiaries of the net flow of FDI are Latin America, Asia Pacific, North America, Central and Eastern Europe, and Africa. The negative FDI is only in Western Europe which invests more in other regions rather than accepting investments. Generally it can be concluded that 92% of investment originating from developed countries and 72% of them come back again in these countries.

== Impact of foreign investments in Kosovo ==
On the other hand, taking into consideration the favorable business climate, stable macroeconomic environment and the excellent opportunities across different business sectors, Kosovo, even though at a very slow pace, is increasingly becoming a very attractive place for doing business. As result, the interest of foreign investors has been increasing steadily during the past years and with it the inflow of FDI. Kosovo has so far attracted over 1 billion Euro of FDI. Apart from investment pioneers such as the Raiffeisen Bank and Procredit, which entered the Kosovar market at the beginning of the transition phase, there are many other foreign companies engaged in a wide range of business sectors. According to the Business Registry data, there are over 2,000 companies of foreign and mixed ownership that have already used the opportunity to invest in Kosovo. The large number of foreign companies operating in Kosovo is a living proof of the opportunities and benefits that the country offers, and also represents a base of quality products and a sufficient service-providing community.

Even though it is a developing country, it seems that Kosovo surprisingly does have large number of investors and foreign businessmen. According to Investment Promotion Agency which operates under the Ministry of Trade and Industry, shows that in Kosovo are registered 3906 foreign investors. The majority of these investors are individuals who have their own companies in the respective countries and have started their branches in Kosovo.

From Switzerland, there are 112 investors focused mostly in the cities of Pristina, Peja, Gjakova, Suva Reka, Ferizaj and others. Though the number of investors is surprising, even more impressive is the employment generated by these investors. While some investors are employing people in thousands, others are hiring in lower numbers. Among foreign companies who have invested in Kosovo, the highest number of employees work in Feronikel in Drenas with 1,000 persons.

Next to Feronikel, another company into smoke production in Gjilan appears to have a large number of employees (400) followed by Turkey with 370 persons. The fields that have attracted maximum foreign investors is the banking sector, transportation, tourism, education, telecommunication, and marketing.

According to the statistics, the elementary total sum of the capital of all foreign direct investments in Kosovo, covering all the fields they invested in, is 3,648,949,859 euro. The places where the foreign investors in Kosovo come from, are different, but the Investors map does not continue further than Turkey. Except for regions like Albania, Turkey, Croatia or Macedonia, Kosovo is supported the most by western Europe. The number of Investors from western Europe to choose Kosovo as a place to invest in is relatively high and they mostly are from Switzerland, Germany, France, Great Britain, even the United States.

These foreign Investors take place almost in all the cities of Kosovo, but they are more noticeable in the capital, Pristina. Investors from Germany contribute in construction companies, Serbia in market, while other businesses that investors like France and Bosnia & Herzegovina lead, contain milk preparation and market. According to Kosovo Central Bank's official data, it is shown that Germany holds the highest number of Investors in Kosovo. Right after Germany, with direct foreign investment comes Albania with 23.32%, then Switzerland with 22.71% and Austria with 15.50%. However the level of unemployment and poverty in Kosovo still stands high.

== See also ==
- Economy of Kosovo
