= Camp Casablanca =

Military base in Kosovo

Coordinates: 42°20′53″N 20°49′23″E

- Kampi Casablanka/Njësia Damper
- Suhareka, Kosovo
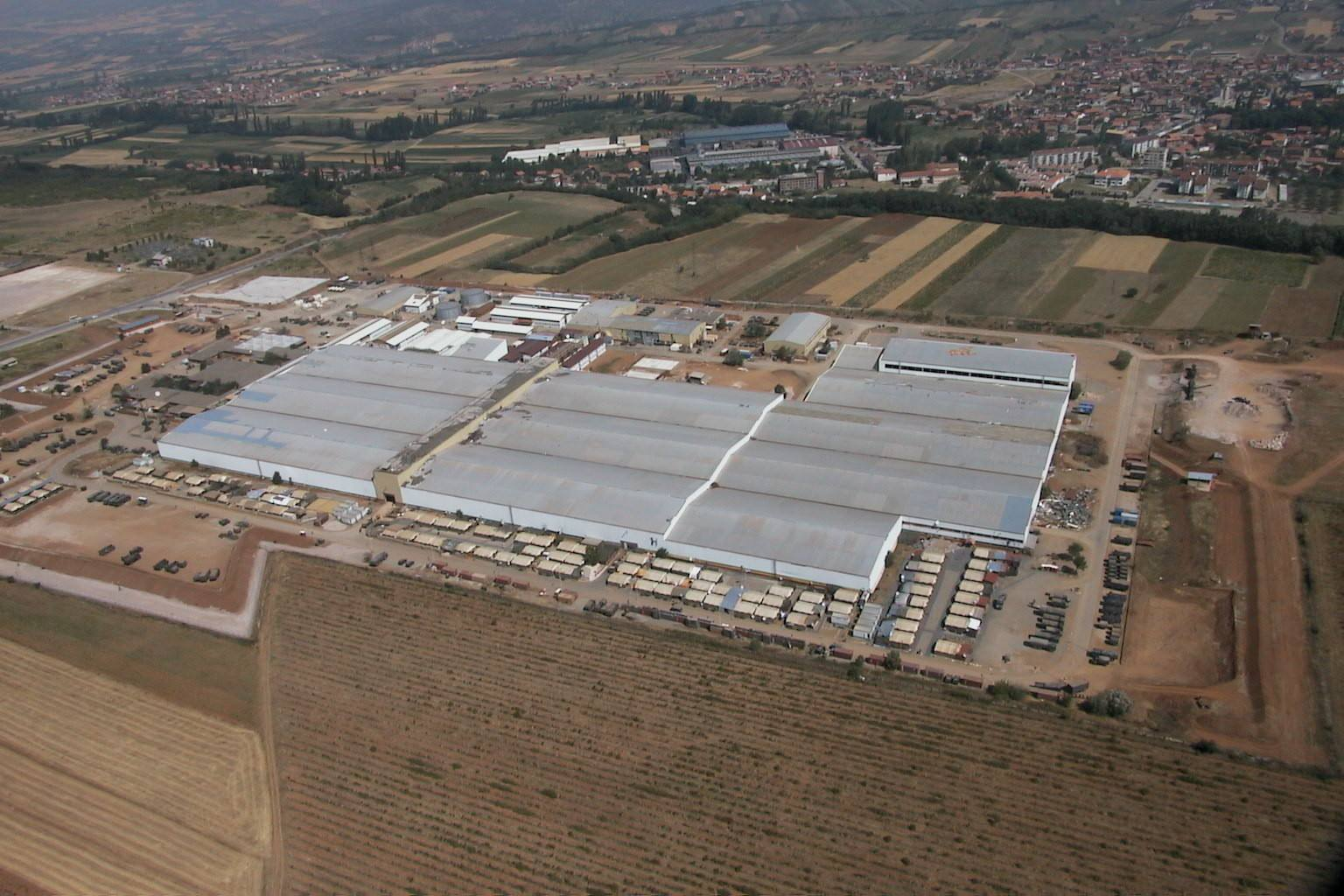
- Aerial photo of Camp Casablanca

Site information
- Type: Military base
- Owner: Ministry of Defence of Kosovo
- Operator: Kosovo Security Force

Location
- Location of the military base Camp Casablanca within Kosovo

Site history
- In use: 1999–present

Camp Casablanca (Albanian: Kampi Casablanka), also known as The Damper Unit (Albanian: Njësia Damper) is a military base located in the city of Suhareka, Kosovo.

== History ==
From 1999 to 2012 it has been home to many foreign NATO troops, including German forces, and it occasionally houses U.S. troops as well. Austrian and Swiss troops were also located here. The camp was originally established by the German Army to maintain a NATO peacekeeping presence after the Kosovo War of 1999. The base was operational until 17 March 2012, when the premises were transferred to Suva Reka municipality for development.
