= Bled Strategic Forum =

International conference

- Abbreviation: BSF
- Formation: 27 August 2006
- Founder: Government of the Republic of Slovenia
- Type: International Conference
- Location: Bled, Slovenia
- Region served: Central and Southeastern Europe
- Secretary General: Peter Grk
- Subsidiaries: Young BSF
- Website: bledstrategicforum.org

The Bled Strategic Forum is a global ideas platform founded in August 2006 by the government of the Republic of Slovenia on initiative of Dimitrij Rupel, then Slovenian Minister of Foreign Affairs. Ever since it is held in Bled Congress Centre next to Lake Bled.

It produces events, discussions, roundtables, projects, analyses and publications.

== Bled Strategic Forum International Conference ==
The annual Bled Strategic Forum International Conference, hosted in Bled, Slovenia, is a gathering of participants from various fields to exchange views and ideas. It is an intragovernmental project of the Republic of Slovenia that focuses on areas that align with Slovenian foreign policy priorities. The event traditionally takes place at the end of the summer (usually just before the UN General Assembly in September), each year under a different title that guides the content of the sessions.

=== History ===
The Bled Strategic Forum was launched in 2006, at a time when Slovenia was embarking on its path of European and Euro-Atlantic integration after joining the EU and NATO in 2004. The event was created on the basis of the successful Slovenian Chairmanship of the OSCE. The venue – Bled – was chosen for its picturesque Alpine setting and prominence.

In 2011, the Young Bled Strategic Forum was added. Since then, the Young BSF has grown from a one-day side event into a standalone three-day international conference for young participants. From 2012 to 2019, the programme also featured Business BSF, which has later been integrated into its main part.

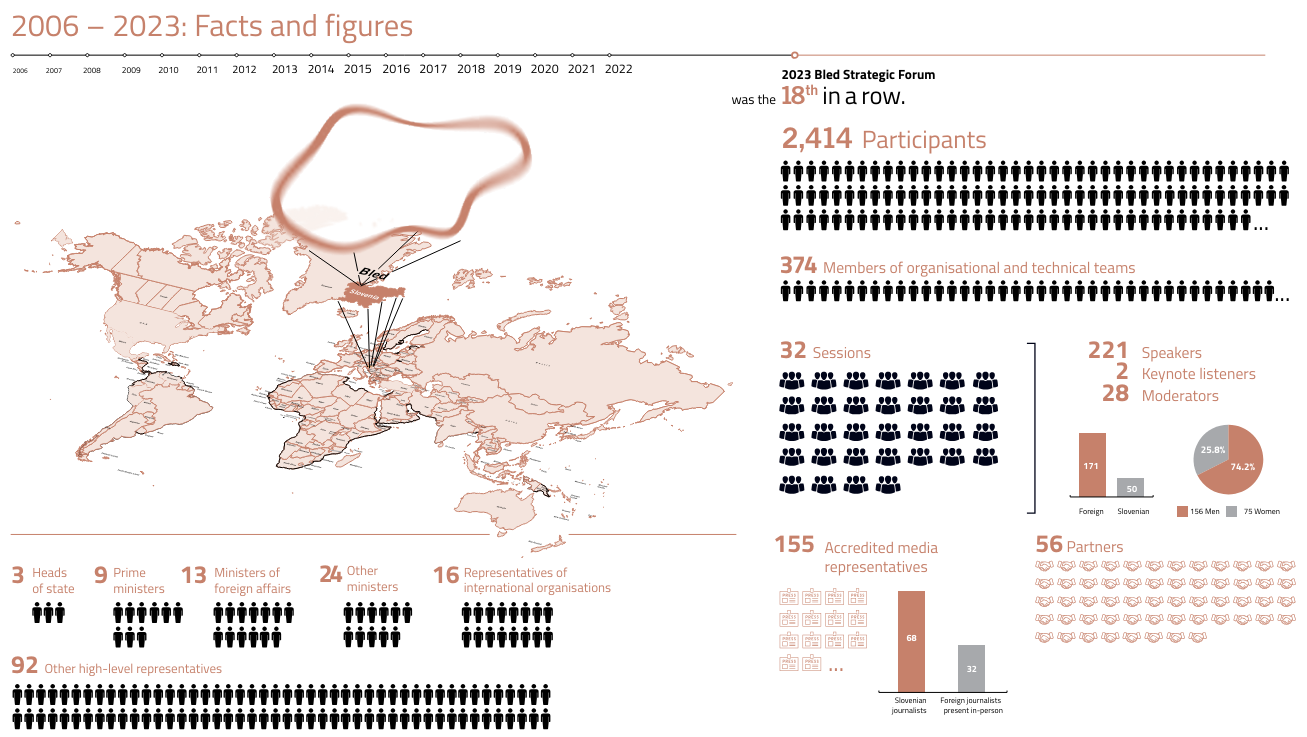
Bled Strategic Forum Facts and Figures 2023

Over the years, the event has hosted some 60 heads of state and government, 380 ministers and 150 representatives of international organisations, as well as over 250 think-tank representatives and 1500 media representatives.

=== Notable speakers ===
Bled Congress Centre

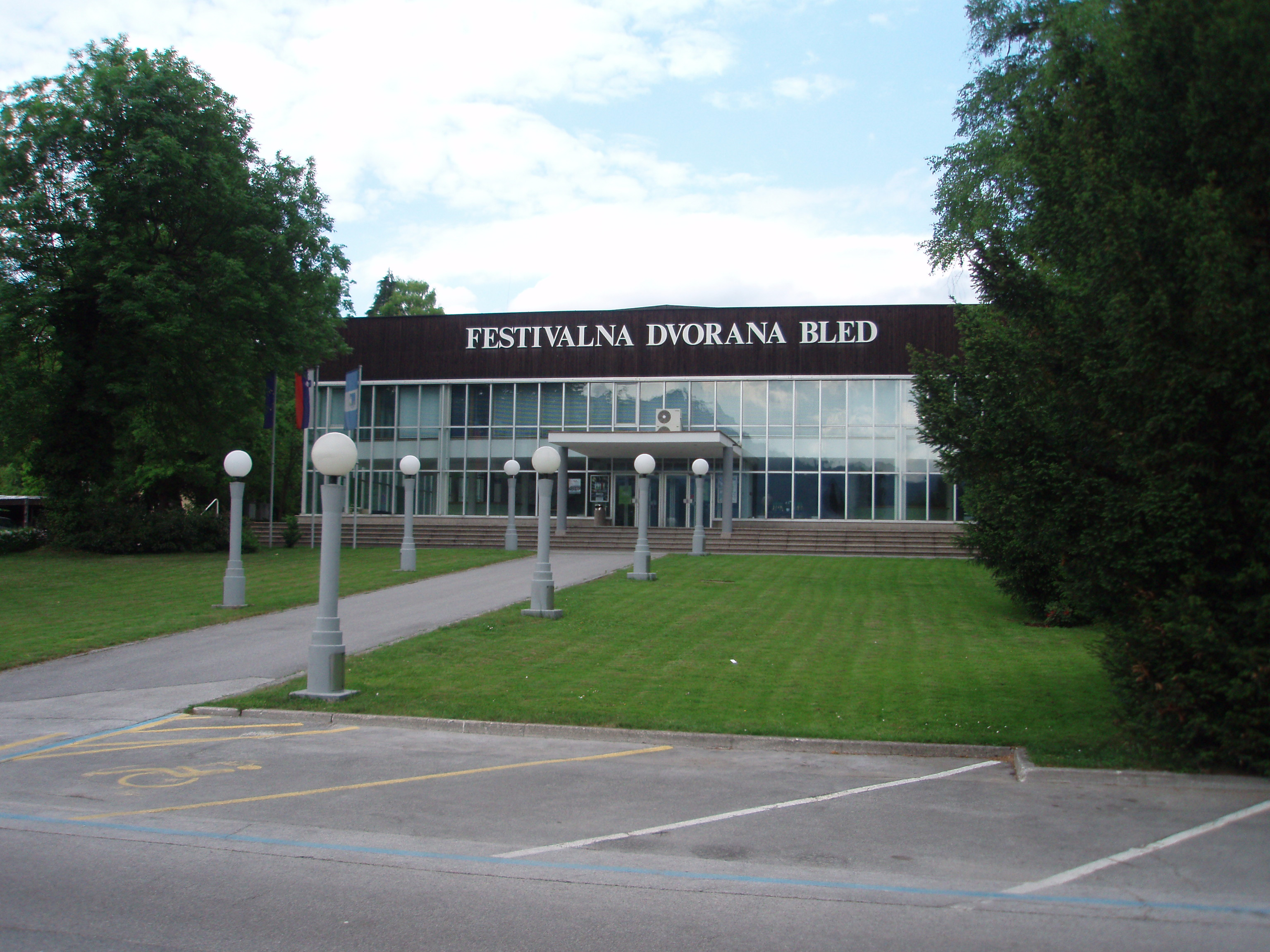
... is host since the beginning

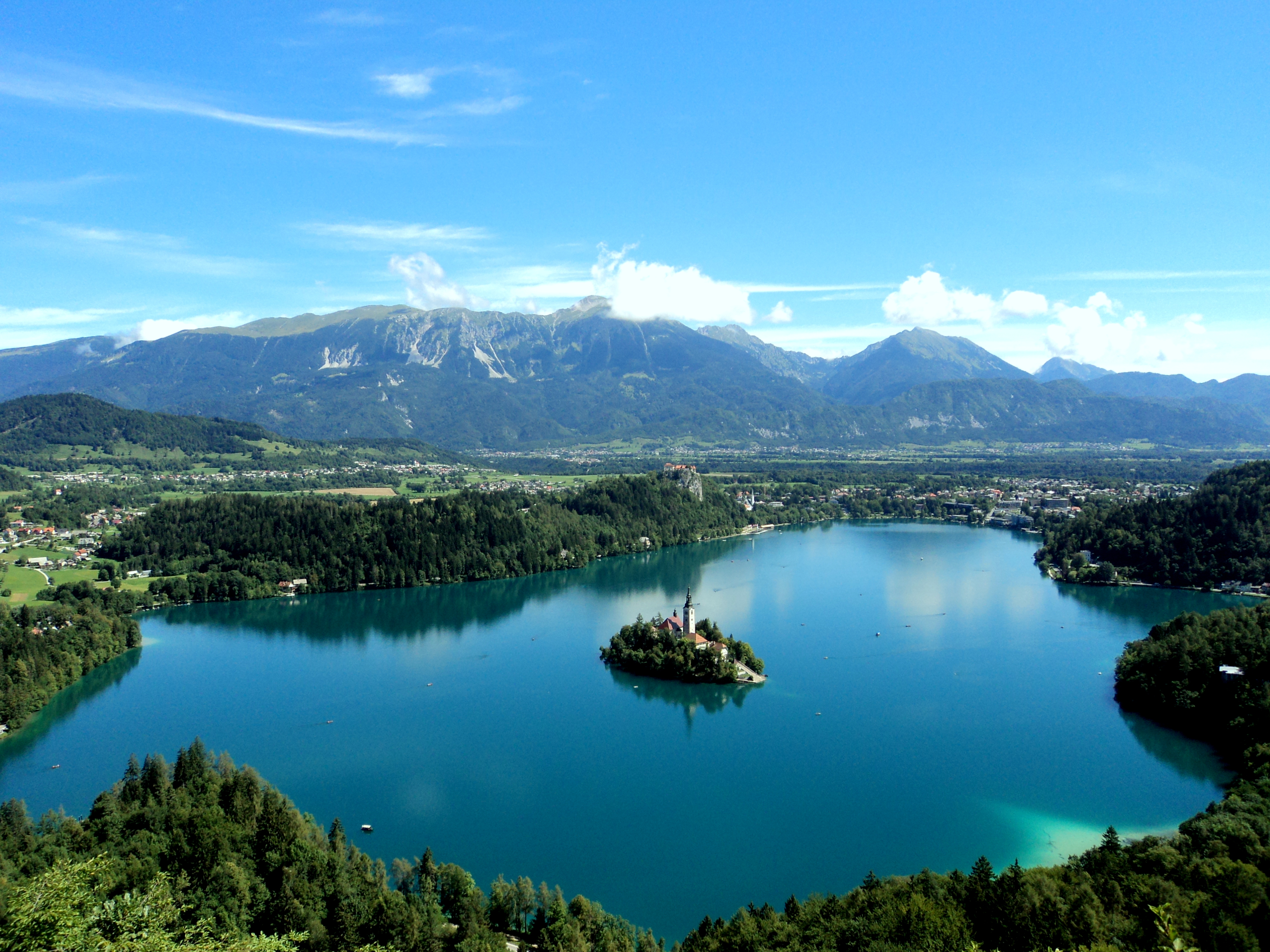
and located next to Lake Bled

- Charles Michel, President of the European Council
- Ursula von der Leyen, President of the European Commission
- Josep Borrell, High Representative of the European Union, Europe's great responsibility, 2020
- Michelle Bachelet, United Nations High Commissioner for Human Rights
- María Fernanda Espinosa, President of the 73rd United Nations General Assembly
- Miroslav Lajčák, President of the 72nd United Nations General Assembly
- Slavoj Žižek, Slovenian philosopher
- Volodymyr Zelenskyy, President of Ukraine
- Tony Blair, Prime Minister of the United Kingdom
- Katarina Čas, Slovenian actor
- Enrico Letta, Member of the Chamber of Deputies of Italy
- Sebastian Cavazza, Slovenian actor

==== The Bled Pledge ====
In his speech to the attendees of the Bled Strategic Forum International Conference in 2023, Charles Michel, the President of the European Council, set the goal for the EU and the Western Balkans to be ready for Enlargement by 2030. The speech is known as the Bled Pledge.

=== Past editions ===
- 2023: Solidarity for Global Security
- 2022: The Rule of Power or the Power of Rules?
- 2021: Future of Europe
- 2020: Challenges and Opportunities in the Post-COVID–19 World; Neighbours – Regions – Global World: Partners or Rivals?
- 2019: (Re)sources of (In)stability
- 2018: Bridging the Divide
- 2017: New Reality
- 2016: Safeguarding the Future
- 2015: Visions of New Partnerships
- 2014: Power of Trust
- 2013: A Changing Europe in a Changing World
- 2012: Europe and the Reshaped Global Order
- 2011: The Power of Future
- 2010: Global Outlook for the Next Decade
- 2009: The Politics of Economic Crisis: Redefining Economic and Geopolitical Landscapes in Europe and Eurasia
- 2008: Energy and Climate Change: Si.nergy for the Future
- 2007: European Union 2020: Enlarging and Integrating
- 2006: Political Reform and Sustainable Development in the South Caucasus

== Partnerships ==
In order to expand the Bled Strategic Forum into a year-round platform, the organisation collaborates with other conferences and organisations, usually through joint sessions.

In 2024, the Bled Strategic Forum co-organised a debate at the Munich Security Conference. The Bled Strategic Forum team attended the Raisina Dialogue in New Delhi. In the same year, it also partnered with the Center for China and Globalization for a roundtable on Climate Change and Global Resilience in Beijing.

The Bled Strategic Forum's close partners also include Interpeace, the BMW Foundation, the Global Diplomacy Lab, etc.

== Secretaries general ==
The secretary general of the Bled Strategic Forum is responsible for steering the development and preparing events throughout the year.

List of the secretaries general of the Bled Strategic Forum
Start	End	Name
2016	current	Peter Grk
2013	2015	Alain Brian Bergant
2010	2012	Miriam Možgan
2009	2009	Melita Gabrič
2006	2008	Darja Bavdaž Kuret

== Young Bled Strategic Forum ==
The first Young BSF took place in 2011 under the title 'The Power of the Future'. It was established with the aim of bringing together students and prospective young professionals from the diplomatic, academic and think-thank fields in both Europe and the Mediterranean region.

Since then, the Young BSF has developed from a one-day side event with a couple of the discussions happening on the margins of the Bled Strategic Forum into a three-day separate international conference for young participants from all over the world. Young BSF is now a separate event, yet connected with the Bled Strategic Forum.

=== Past editions ===
- 2026: Shaping the Unknown: Order, Fragility, and Trust
- 2025: A World in Flux: Navigating the Next Era
- 2024: A World of Parallel Realities
- 2023: Mitigating our Butterfly Effect
- 2022: Democracy fit for the new age
- 2021: Future of Europe: Youth at the Centre
- 2020: Reinventing the Role of Youth in Society
- 2019: Youth as a (Future) (Re)source
- 2018: Sustainable Security: The Role of Youth in Bridging the Divide
- 2017: The (Dis)connected Reality
- 2016: Generation of Global Citizens
- 2015: Building the Future
- 2014: Potential of Trust
- 2013: The Clash of Generations
- 2012: Young BSF
- 2011: The Power of the Future
