= Suva Reka =

Suva Reka: Suharekë or Therandë (Albanian) Sevce or Севце (Serbian)
- Town and municipality
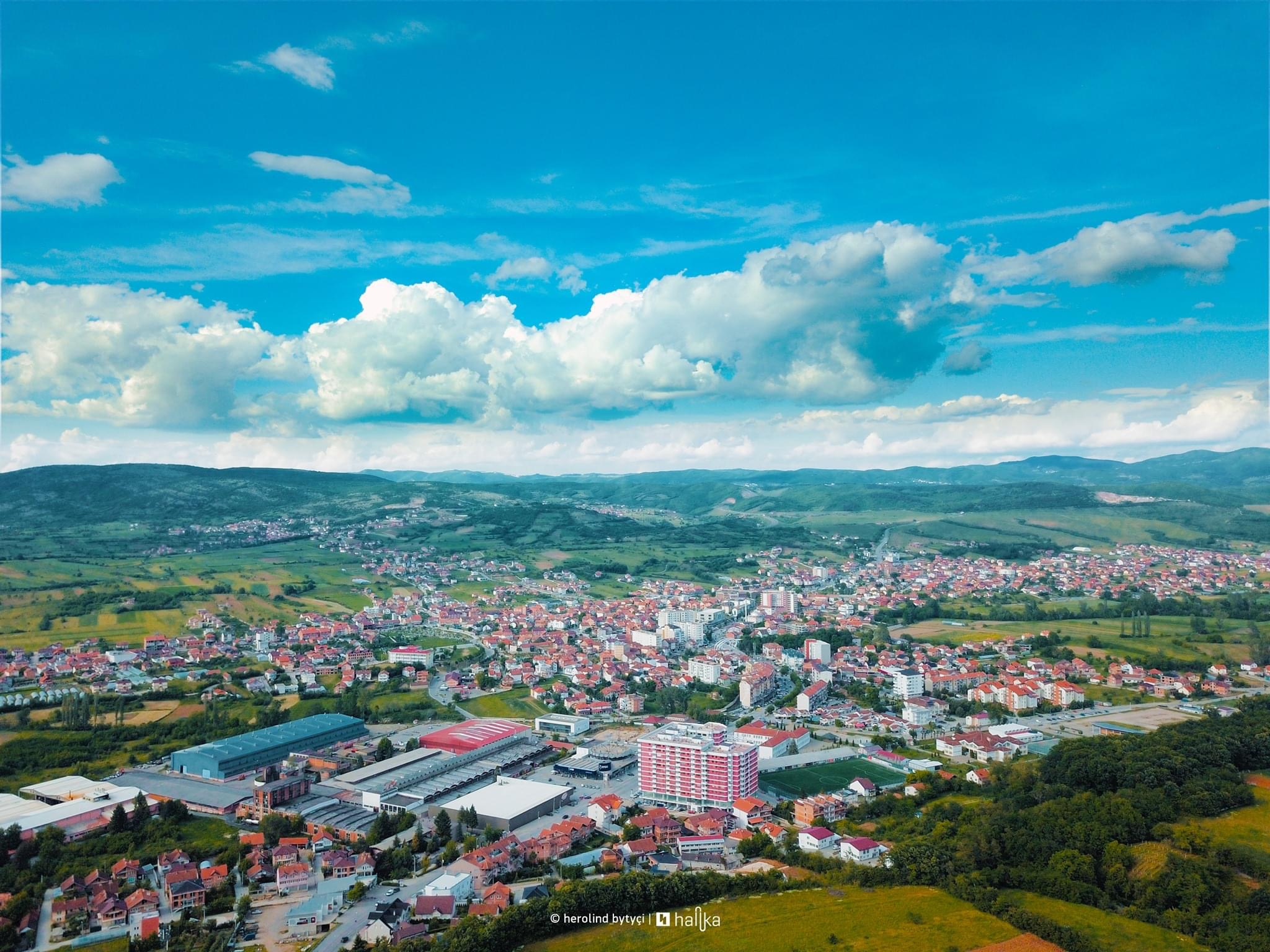
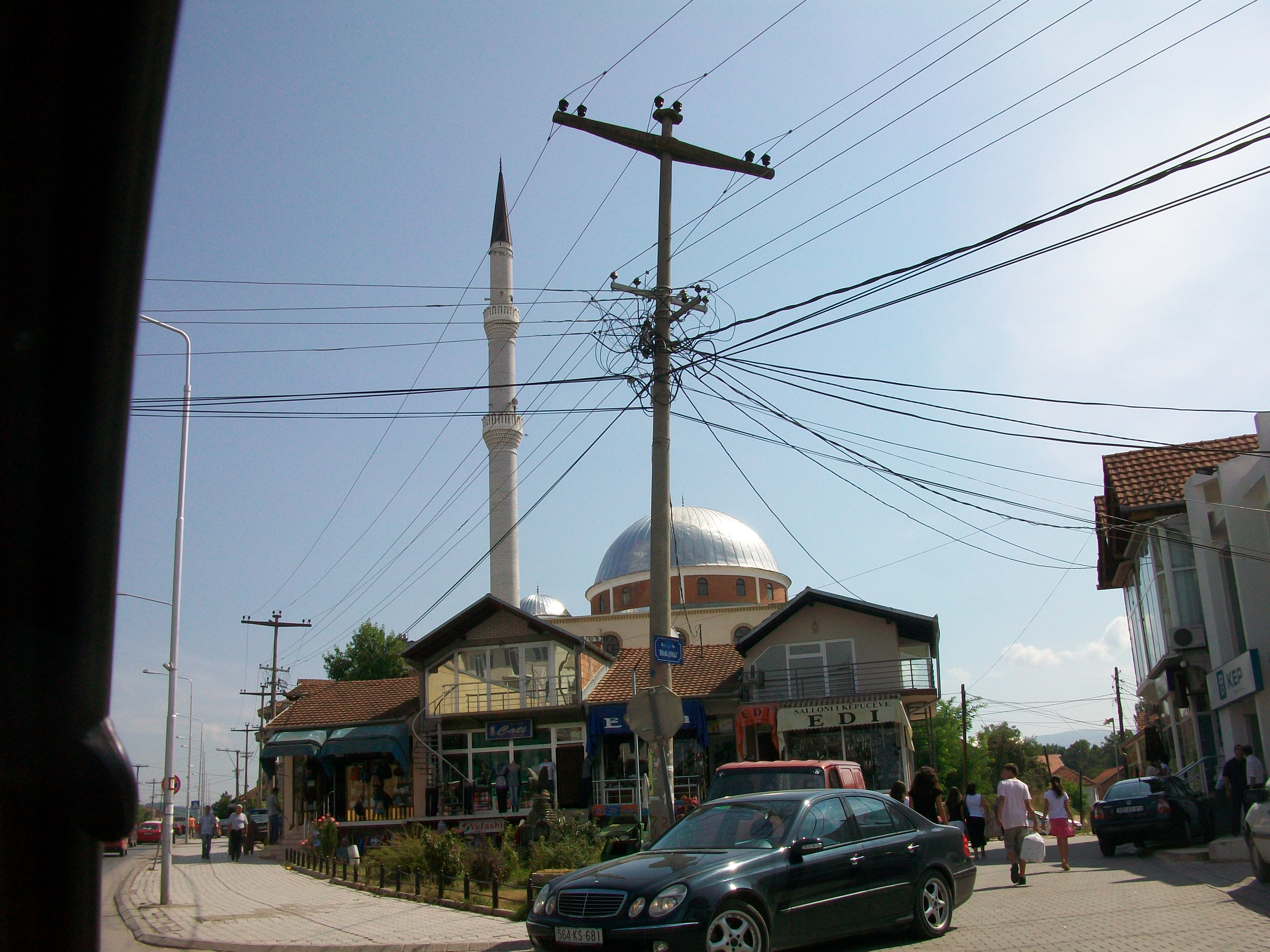
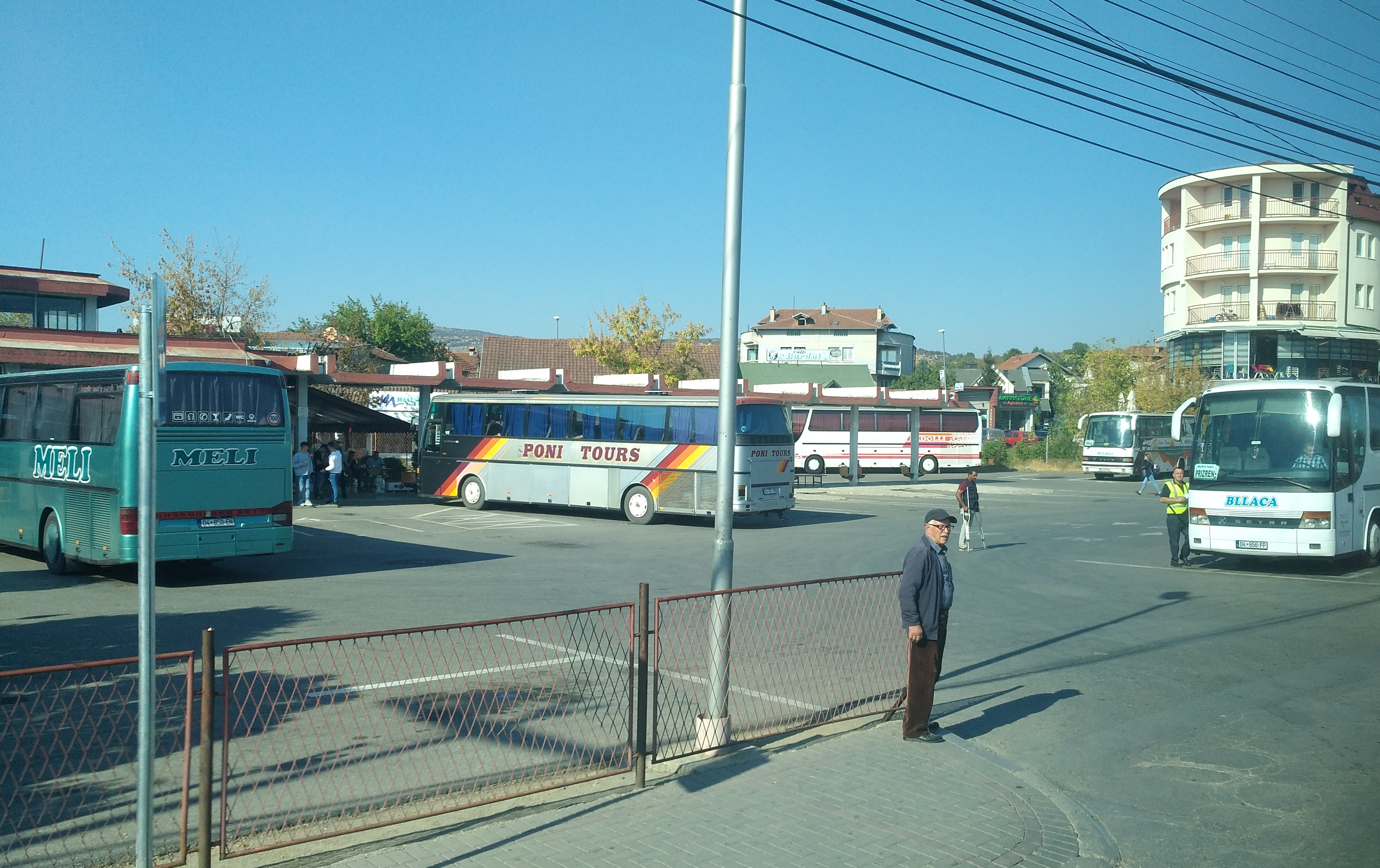
- From the top, View of Suhareka, Suva Reka's mosque, Suva Reka Bus station

- Flag Seal
- Interactive map of Suva Reka
- Location within Kosovo
- Coordinates: 42°22′48″N 20°49′19″E
- Country: Kosovo
- District: Prizren

Government
  - Mayor: Bali Muharremaj (AAK)

Area
  - Municipality: 361 km^{2} (139 sq mi)
  - Rank: 12th in Kosovo
- Elevation: 389 m (1,276 ft)

Population (2024)
  - Municipality: 45,713
- Demonym(s): Albanian: Therandas (m), Therandase (f)
- Time zone: UTC+1 (CET)
  - Summer (DST): UTC+2 (CEST)
- Postal code: 23000
- Area code: +383 29
- Vehicle registration: 04
- Climate: Cfb
- Website: kk.rks-gov.net/suhareke

Suva Reka (Serbian Cyrillic: Сува Река) or Suharekë (Albanian definite form: Suhareka) or Therandë (Albanian definite form: Theranda) is a town and municipality located in the Prizren district of central-southern Kosovo. According to the 2011 census, the town has 10,422 inhabitants, while the municipality has 59,722 inhabitants mostly Kosovo Albanians.

Suva Reka is located 18 km (11 mi) from the city of Prizren, and 57 km (35 mi) from Kosovo's capital, Pristina.

== Name ==
Suva Reka means "dry river" in the Serbian language. The Albanian spellings are Suharekë or Suhareka (derived from the Slavic form), while an alternative Therandë, was adopted from an unlocated ancient site (possibly in Suhareka or Lubizhdë in the Mirusha valley.

== History ==
=== Ancient History ===
The municipality includes several medieval sites and old settlements, such as the villages of Banjë, Duhël, Mushtishtë, Popolan, Reçan, and churches of Virgin Hodegetria, St. George, Holy Trinity, St. Nicholas, among others. The settlement of Theranda itself was first mentioned in 1465 and is thought to date back to the 2nd century BC. Theranda was an important roman commercial city and also served as a military outpost with an amphitheater, public baths, stone walls and a gate.

=== Ottoman period ===
In 1651, an Albanian Catholic priest, Gregor Mazrreku reported that all the men in Suharekë (Suva Reka), where there had previously been 160 Catholic households, had converted to Islam. However, approximately 36 or 37 of their wives remained Catholic.

=== Yugoslav period ===
From 1929 to 1941, Suva Reka was administratively part of the Vardar Banovina within the Kingdom of Yugoslavia. Between 1918 and 1941, the demographic composition of the Suva Reka municipality was influenced by settlement and colonization efforts, notably the Serbian colonization, with most settlers originating from the Toplica District.

During World War II, Albanians destroyed the Serbian church in Trnje in Suva Reka. On the night of 9–10 June 1984, ethnic Albanians desecrated 29 tombstones of the Church of the Holy Saviour.

=== Kosovo War and aftermath ===
During the Kosovo War (1998–99), the Kosovo Liberation Army (KLA) operated in the region and it was reported that it had killed and wounded several Serbian policemen and civilians. Among KLA attacks against police officers recorded in 1998 in the municipality were: on 16 August in Bllacë (one badly wounded), on 23 August in Duhël (three badly, four lightly wounded) and in Reshtan (one badly wounded), on 25 August in Duhël (one badly wounded), on 28 September in Budakovë (three badly wounded) and in Vraniq (one lightly wounded). KLA shot at an OSCE vehicle driving behind a FR Yugoslav military convoy between Suva Reka and Shtime on 5 November 1998. On 8 January 1999, KLA members ambushed a MUP convoy near Suva Reka, killing three Serbian policemen. In 10–16 January 1999, FR Yugoslav forces conducted counter-insurgency operations in Suva Reka.

The UNHCR estimated on 18 March 1999 that the Suva Reka municipality had 6,100 displaced and 5,600 returnees. On 25 March, the town was surrounded by the Yugoslav army and police, and 48 Albanians were massacred. 46 of the victims were members of the Berisha family, 14 of whom were under 15 years old. There were reports that Serb forces extorted Albanians in Belanica on 27 March. In April and May 1999, Serb paramilitary repeatedly attacked the villages in the municipality, forcing the population to leave and gather in KLA territory. Human Rights Watch also reported the killing of 11 Albanian men in one village, 24 killed in Trnje, and 12 killed in the village of Belanica. According to the Suva Reka office of the Council for the Defense of Human Rights and Freedoms, 430 people were killed in the Suva Reka municipality during the NATO bombing campaign (24 March-11 June). On 11–12 June 1999, a Serb family of four was kidnapped in Dvorane and never located. On 12 June 1999, KLA attacked Mushtisht and kidnapped eighteen Serb civilians.

After the war, Serbian heritage was destroyed all over Kosovo. The churches (including cemeteries) of Virgin Hodegetria, St. George, Holy Trinity, St. Nicholas and others were completely destroyed in 1999 after the arrival of KFOR and the end of the war.

NATO set up a military base in the municipality, Camp Casablanca.

== Culture ==
=== Churches ===
- Church of the Virgin Hodegetria, Mušutište, built 1315, destroyed 1999
- Church of St. George (Rečane), built in the 14th century, destroyed 1999
- Church of the Holy Trinity, Mušutište, built before 1465, destroyed 1999
- Church of the Holy Saviour, Mušutište, built in 1465, destroyed 1999
- Church of St. Nicholas, Popovljane, built in 1626, destroyed 1999
- Church of Archangel Michael, Dvorane, built in the 19th century, destroyed 1999
- Church of the Holy Saviour, Dvorane, built in the 19th century, destroyed 1999
- Church of the Holy Apostles Peter and Paul, Suva Reka, built 1938, destroyed 1999
- Church of St. Parasčeva, Mušutište, built 1973, destroyed 1999

=== Mosques ===
- Xhamia e Bardhë
- Peçan Mosque
- Semetisht Mosque
- Gjinoc Mosque
- Sopinë Mosque

== Demographics ==
Municipal historical population
Year	Pop.	±% p.a.
1948	27,044	—
1953	30,184	+2.22%
1961	34,729	+1.77%
1971	45,316	+2.70%
1981	59,434	+2.75%
1991	72,229	+1.97%
2011	59,722	−0.95%
2024	45,713	−2.04%
Source: Division of Kosovo

According to the 2011 census done by the Government of Kosovo, the municipality of Suva Reka had 59,722 inhabitants of which 98.9% were Kosovo Albanians. According to OSCE, the whereabouts of the displaced Serb and Roma communities is unknown.

== Twin towns – Sister cities ==
Suva Reka is twinned with:

- Sarandë, Albania
- Fellbach, Germany
- Lilburn, United States

== Sources ==
- Krieger, Heike, ed. (2001). The Kosovo Conflict and International Law: An Analytical Documentation 1974–1999. Cambridge University Press. ISBN 978-0521800716.
