= Church of St. George, Rečane =

Serbian Orthodox Church in Rečane, Kosovo

Church of St. George (Rečane) Црква Светог Ђорђa (Речане) Kisha e Shën Gjergjit në Reçan

Religion
- Affiliation: Serbian Orthodox
- Year consecrated: Unknown, pre 1370

Location
- Location: Rečane, Suva Reka, Kosovo
- Interactive map of Church of St. George (Rečane); Црква Светог Ђорђa (Речане); Kisha e Shën Gjergjit në Reçan

Architecture
- Cultural Heritage of Serbia
- Official name: Crkva svetog Đorđa u Rečanima
- Type: Monument of Culture
- Designated: 11 September 1953

The Church of St. George (Rečane) was a small Serbian Orthodox Church, located in the village of Rečane, Kosovo. It belonged to the Diocese of Raška and Prizren of the Serbian Orthodox Church.

== History ==
It is unknown exactly when the church was built, however a tombstone inscription on the floor of the church suggests that the church was built before 1370. The church plan and building method were built in line with the Serbo-Byzantine style of architecture, a style common in the 14th century. It is purported that the church was commissioned in the name of an unknown Serbian military vojvoda who was buried on the church grounds. This is further supported by the fact that the church was consecrated in the name of Saint George, a highly venerated saint among the Serbian military nobility at the time. Two restoration works were completed in the 20th century, one in 1926 and another from 1956 to 1960. In 1953, the church was classified as a cultural monument and placed under state protection.

== Structure ==
The church was small in size, consisting of a reduced cross-in-square layout with three bays and a dome. The façade was rendered in stone with added brickwork and ceramoplastic elements in the upper sections.

== Frescoes ==
Despite being small in size, the church was notable for its frescoes and architecture. The frescoes had a recurring theme of military saints. However, the placement of frescoes and choice of saints were in line with those depicted in other churches from the same time period. The life of St George was depicted in the second zone of the western bay. This included his life before martyrdom, discussions with his father, the destruction of gold and silver idols and, him giving his wealth away. The frescoes were painted by two painters in the 14th century, however evidence of fire damage was noted which impacted the visual appearance of the frescoes to a minor degree.

== Destruction ==
In 1999, following the arrival of KFOR troops after the end of the Kosovo War, the church was burned and later completely demolished with explosives by extremist Kosovo Albanians. A collection of both black and white and colour photographs of the church frescoes and building was collected in the 1980s. The collection serves as the only evidence of the church existing.
