= Special Representative of the Secretary-General for Kosovo =

United Nations position

The special representative of the secretary-general for Kosovo (SRSG) is appointed by the secretary-general to lead the United Nations Interim Administration Mission in Kosovo (UNMIK). During the United Nations rule between 1999 and 2008, the Joint Interim Administrative Structure and then the Provisional Institutions of Self-Government were accountable to the special representative.

== List of special representatives ==
No.	Name	Lifespan	Term of office		State
Act.	Sérgio Vieira de Mello	1948–2003	11 June 1999	14 July 1999	Brazil
1	Bernard Kouchner	1939–	15 July 1999	12 January 2001	France
2	Hans Hækkerup	1945–2013	13 January 2001	31 December 2001	Denmark
Act.	Charles H. Brayshaw	1942–	1 January 2002	14 February 2002	United States
3	Michael Steiner	1949–	14 February 2002	8 July 2003	Germany
Act.	Charles H. Brayshaw	1942–	8 July 2003	25 August 2003	United States
4	Harri Holkeri	1937–2011	25 August 2003	11 June 2004	Finland
Act.	Charles H. Brayshaw	1942–	11 June 2004	16 August 2004	United States
5	Søren Jessen-Petersen	1945–	16 August 2004	30 June 2006	Denmark
Act.	Steven P. Schook	1953–	30 June 2006	31 August 2006	United States
6	Joachim Rücker	1951–	1 September 2006	20 June 2008	Germany
7	Lamberto Zannier	1954–	20 June 2008	30 June 2011	Italy
Act.	Robert E. Sorenson	—N/a	1 July 2011	3 August 2011	United States
8	Farid Zarif	1951–	3 August 2011	31 August 2015	Afghanistan
Act.	Simona Miculescu	1959–	1 September 2015	9 October 2015	Romania
9	Zahir Tanin	1956–	9 October 2015	4 November 2021	Afghanistan
Act.	Barrie Lynne Freeman	—N/a	4 November 2021	19 January 2022	United States
10	Caroline Ziadeh	1974–	19 January 2022	20 August 2025	Lebanon
Act.	Milbert Dongjoon Shin	—N/a	20 August 2025	10 November 2025	United States
11	Peter N. Due	—N/a	10 November 2025	Incumbent	Denmark

== See also ==
- Special Representative of the Secretary-General
- High Representative for Bosnia and Herzegovina
