= Steven P. Schook =

United States Army general

- Born: 1953 (age 72–73); Mount Clemens, Michigan
- Military career
- Allegiance: United States
- Branch: United States Army
- Rank: Brigadier General
- Commands: Stabilisation Force in Bosnia and Herzegovina; 3rd Brigade, 3rd Infantry Division (Mechanized); 2nd Battalion, 7th Cavalry Regiment
- Awards: Defense Superior Service Medal; Legion of Merit (3); Gold Cross of Honour of the Bundeswehr (Germany)
- Other work: Technology executive Principal Deputy Special Representative of the Secretary-General for Kosovo

Steven P. Schook (born 1953) is a retired United States Army brigadier general and former United Nations diplomat.

== Career ==
Schook was born and raised in Mount Clemens, Michigan. He graduated from the United States Military Academy as a Regular Army Infantry officer and, later, from the United States Naval War College.

After several assignments as an operations and executive officer, he assumed command of the 2nd Battalion, 7th Cavalry Regiment, 1st Cavalry Division, the, after attending the Naval War College, assumed command of the 3rd Brigade, 3rd Infantry Division (Mechanized).

From 1997 to 2002, Schook served on the Joint Staff and in the United States Army Forces Command. His general officer assignments include Chief of Staff, III Corps, and Assistant Division Commander, 1st Cavalry Division. He also served as director at the Human Resources Policy Directorate, Headquarters, Department of the Army. In 2003, he was appointed as the Chief of Staff, Kosovo Force (Main), Camp Bondsteel, and in 2004 he was given command of the SFOR in Bosnia and Herzegovina, then Commander and Senior Military Representative of NATO headquarters.

He left the Army in 2005 and began working as a senior vice president of New Technology Management Inc.

== Diplomatic assignments ==
On April 19, 2006, United Nations Secretary General Kofi Annan appointed Schook the Principal Deputy Special Representative of the UN Secretary General (PDSRSG) in Kosovo. Schook succeeded Lawrence Rossin in that position and worked under SRSG Søren Jessen-Petersen and Joachim Rücker.

Schook was investigated by the United Nations Office of Internal Oversight Services (OIOS) in 2007; his contract with the OIOS was not subsequently renewed and he was succeeded by Lawrence Rossin. In May 2008, Schook was cleared of all wrongdoing as OIOS concluded that there was no evidence of misconduct on his part. Schook now works in Kosovo as an advisor for Ramush Haradinaj.
