= United Nations Interim Administration Mission in Kosovo =

Officially mandated mission of the United Nations in Kosovo

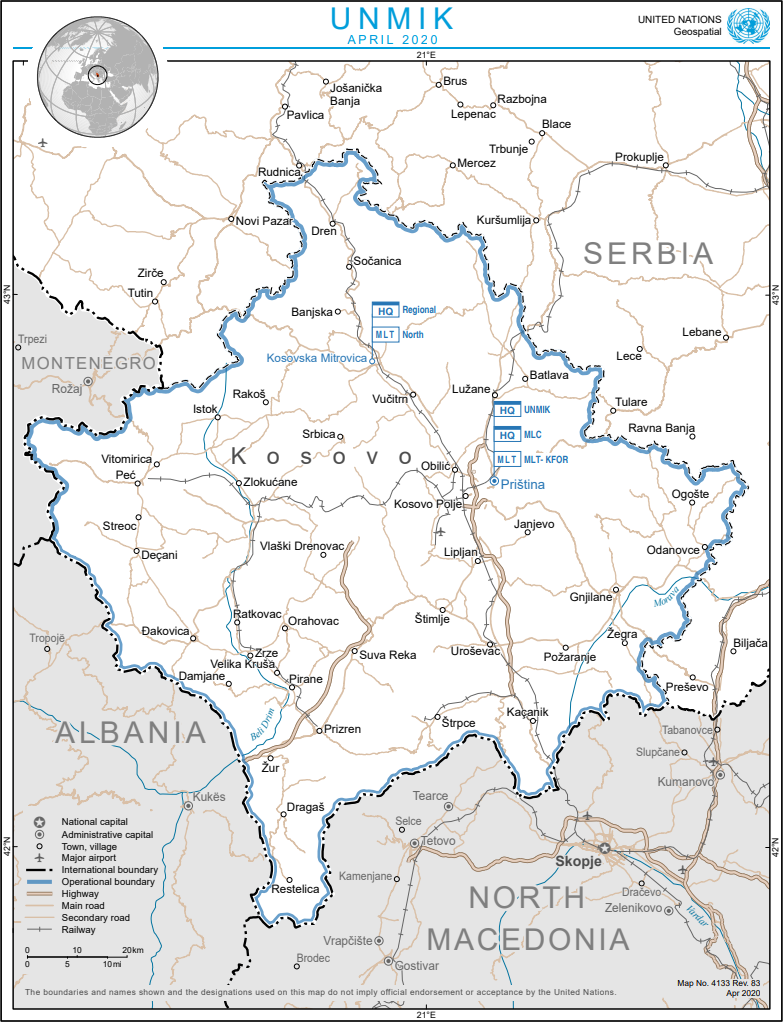
- Map of UNMIK infrastructure in Kosovo
- Abbreviation: UNMIK
- Formation: 10 June 1999; 27 years ago
- Type: Special observational mission
- Legal status: Active
- Headquarters: Pristina
- Special Representative: Peter N. Due
- Parent organization: United Nations Security Council
- Website: unmik.unmissions.org

The United Nations Interim Administration Mission in Kosovo (UNMIK) (Note: Albanian: Misioni i Administratës së Përkohshme të Kombeve të Bashkuara në Kosovë, Serbian: Привремена административна мисија Уједињених нација на Косову, romanized: Privremena administrativna misija Ujedinjenih nacija na Kosovu) is an officially mandated United Nations mission in Kosovo. UNMIK describes its mandate as being to "help the United Nations Security Council achieve an overall objective, namely, to ensure conditions for a peaceful and normal life for all inhabitants of Kosovo and advance regional stability in the Western Balkans."

The UNMIK was established pursuant to Security Council Resolution 1244, which was passed on 10 June 1999. The Resolution authorised an international civil and military presence in the Federal Republic of Yugoslavia. In that Resolution, the UN decided to "[deploy] in Kosovo, under United Nations auspices, [an] international civil and security [presence]". From 2003 to 2013, the Office of Political Affairs was headed by Jolyon Naegele.

The Assembly of Kosovo adopted the declaration of independence on 17 February 2008; Kosovo Serb parliamentarians boycotted the session. Serbia considers the declaration to be illegal under its constitutional law as it violates the eighth article of the Constitution of Serbia. However, the International Court of Justice rendered an advisory opinion holding that Kosovo's declaration of independence was not in violation of international law nor of Security Council Resolution 1244. However, this judgement only adjudicated the question of if issuing a document declaring independence was inherently illegal, not if the declaration itself is valid and results in Kosovo being a sovereign state.

The UNMIK still exists today, but its day-to-day functions are relatively minor since Kosovo declared independence and adopted a new constitution, and following the creation of the European Union Rule of Law Mission in Kosovo (EULEX), which itself operates within the framework of Security Council Resolution 1244. EULEX assists and supports the Kosovo authorities in the rule of law area, specifically in the police, judiciary and customs areas. In September 2012, international supervision ended, and Kosovo became responsible for its own governance.

Kosovo is the subject of a long-running political and territorial dispute between the Serbian (and previously, the Yugoslav) government and Kosovo's largely ethnic Albanian population. Public opinion polls indicate that a clear majority of Kosovo's population support Kosovo's independence. Internationally, a majority of the United Nations' member states (118 of 193) and a majority of European countries have recognized Kosovo's independence (although some countries have later been reported to have revoked their recognition).

The head of the UNMIK is the special representative of the secretary-general for Kosovo ('SRSG' for Kosovo) and is appointed by the secretary-general under the advice of UN member states. Caroline Ziadeh was appointed SRSG in November 2021 and arrived in Kosovo in January 2022.

== Structure ==
The UNMIK had been divided into four sections which it calls "pillars". These originally were:

- Pillar I: Humanitarian Affairs (United Nations-led)
- Pillar II: Civil administration (United Nations-led)
- Pillar III: Democratization and institution building (led by the Organization for Security and Co-operation in Europe, OSCE Mission in Kosovo)
- Pillar IV: Reconstruction and economic development (European Union-led)

Following a major internal restructuring of its activities in 2001, this Pillar structure underwent a change. Pillar II was split into two different pillars, the Pillar of Civil administration was retained. However, the Pillar of Humanitarian Affairs was dissolved and a new pillar, the Pillar of Police and justice replaced it having previously being under the jurisdiction of Pillar II. The Dissolution of the Pillar of Humanitarian Affairs caused the Police Commissioner and the Director of the Department of Justice to report to SRSG instead of DSRSG as previously. Pillar II was reduced to a Department of Civil Administration and its Director also reporting directly to the SRSG.

Following the internal restructuring, the Pillar system retained much of its original structure:

- Pillar I: Police and justice (United Nations-led)
- Pillar II: Civil administration (United Nations-led)
- Pillar III: Democratization and institution building (led by the Organization for Security and Co-operation in Europe, OSCE Mission in Kosovo)
- Pillar IV: Reconstruction and economic development (European Union-led)

Responsibility for enforcement of Pillars I and II had been transferred to the Provisional Institutions of Self-Government in Kosovo upon their creation in 2002. The UN, however, still monitored this enforcement.

A NATO-led force called the Kosovo Force (KFOR) provides an international security presence in support of UNMIK's work, but is not subordinate to the UN.

The European Union led economic development includes the privatisation of former government enterprises. This policy has been opposed by Belgrade. This was formerly carried out by the KTA (Kosovo Trust Agency) an EU organisation with Jasper Dick as Managing Director. Since 2008 this role of the KTA has been taken over by The Privatisation Agency of Kosovo.

=== Current institutions ===
- United Nations Security Council Resolution 1244 – legal basis
  - United Nations Interim Administration Mission in Kosovo (UNMIK)
    - Special Representative of the Secretary-General for Kosovo (SRSG)
  - European Union Rule of Law Mission in Kosovo (EULEX)
  - Kosovo Force (KFOR)
  - OSCE Mission in Kosovo (OMiK)

=== List of Special Representatives of the Secretary-General ===
Special Representative	Country	Years
Sérgio Vieira de Mello	Brazil	June–July 1999
Bernard Kouchner	France	July 1999–2001
Hans Hækkerup	Denmark	2001–2002
Michael Steiner	Germany	2002–2003
Harri Holkeri	Finland	2003–2004
Søren Jessen-Petersen	Denmark	2004–2006
Joachim Rücker	Germany	2006–2008
Lamberto Zannier	Italy	2008–2011
Farid Zarif	(Islamic Republic of Afghanistan) Afghanistan	2011–2015
Zahir Tanin	(Islamic Republic of Afghanistan) Afghanistan	2015–2021
Caroline Ziadeh	Lebanon	2021–2025
Peter N. Due	Denmark	2025–

== Duties ==
Resolution 1244 directed the UNMIK to:

- perform basic civilian administrative functions;
- promote the establishment of substantial autonomy and self-government in Kosovo;
- facilitate a political process to determine Kosovo's future status;
- coordinate humanitarian and disaster relief of all international agencies;
- support the reconstruction of key infrastructure;
- maintain civil law and order;
- promote human rights; and
- assure the safe and unimpeded return of all refugees and displaced persons to their homes in Kosovo.

As described above, the UNMIK no longer performs all of these functions.

== History ==
=== 1999 ===
On 25 July (1999), UNMIK issued its first regulation, defining the structure of the UN Interim Administration in Kosovo, and also announcing that laws applicable prior to 24 March 1999 shall continue to be applied in Kosovo, insofar as they do not conflict with UN standards.

Those legal frames were redefined already on 12 December (1999), when UNMIK announced that only laws applicable prior to 22 March 1989 shall continue to be generally applied in Kosovo, but also allowing the possibility for application of later laws - in exceptional situations.

By the autumn of 1999, UNMIK appointed five regional administrators, one for each of the five administrative regions in the UN-administered Kosovo (centered in: Gnjilane, Mitrovica, Peć, Priština, Prizren), and for the lower (municipal) level, municipal administrators were also appointed.

=== 2000 ===
On 14 January (2000), UNMIK created the Joint Interim Administrative Structure (JIAS), and also appointed members for the Kosovo Transitional Council and the Interim Administrative Council.

On 27 July (2000), UNMIK issued regulation on territorial scopes of municipalities in the UN-administered Kosovo, and in cooperation with the OSCE Mission in Kosovo made other preparations for the first local elections, that were held on 28 October (2000).

=== 2001 ===
In 2001, UNMIK promulgated a Constitutional Framework for Kosovo that established the Provisional Institutions of Self-Government (PISG), including an elected Kosovo Assembly, Presidency and office of Prime Minister. Kosovo held its first free, Kosovo-wide elections in late 2001 (municipal elections had been held the previous year). UNMIK oversaw the establishment of a professional, multi-ethnic Kosovo Police Service.

=== 2004 ===
In March 2004, Kosovo experienced its worst inter-ethnic violence since the Kosovo War. The unrest in 2004 was sparked by a series of minor events that soon cascaded into large-scale riots. This event was the motive for protests since no one was ever arrested nor personally accused in the case. Protesting, the Kosovo Albanians mobs burned hundreds of Serbian houses, Serbian Orthodox Church sites (including some medieval churches and monasteries) and UN facilities. Kosovo Police established a special investigation team to handle cases related to the 2004 unrest and according to Kosovo Judicial Council by the end of 2006 the 326 charges filed by municipal and district prosecutors for criminal offenses in connection with the unrest had resulted in 200 indictments: convictions in 134 cases, and courts acquitted eight and dismissed 28; 30 cases were pending. International prosecutors and judges handled the most sensitive cases.

=== 2005 ===
A UN-led political process began in late 2005 to determine Kosovo's future status. Belgrade proposed that Kosovo be highly autonomous and remain a part of Serbia — Belgrade officials repeatedly said that Kosovo's formal independence would be a violation of Serbia's "sovereignty" and therefore contrary to international law and the UN Charter. Representatives of Kosovo's ethnic-Albanian majority asserted that Kosovo must become independent, arguing that the violence of the Milošević years made continued union between Kosovo and Serbia impossible.

UN Special Envoy Martti Ahtisaari, a former president of Finland, led the status process with Austrian diplomat Albert Rohan as his deputy. Ahtisaari's office — the UN Office of the Special Envoy for Kosovo (UNOSEK) — was located in Vienna and includes liaison staff from the NATO, the European Union and the United States.

=== 2006 ===
The initial status negotiations focused on technical issues important for Kosovo's long-term stability, particularly the rights and protection of Kosovo's minorities (and especially the Kosovo Serbs). Ahtisaari brought the parties together for the first direct dialogue in February 2006 to discuss decentralization of local government, an important measure in the protection of Kosovo Serb communities. Subsequent meetings addressed economic issues, property rights, protection of Serbian Orthodox Church heritage and institutional guarantees for the rights of Kosovo's minorities.

On 24 July 2006, Ahtisaari brought the parties together in Vienna for the first high-level talks on the status outcome itself, where the parties presented their respective platforms for Kosovo's future status. Serbia was represented by its President, Boris Tadić and Prime Minister, Vojislav Koštunica, while Kosovo was represented by its President, Fatmir Sejdiu and Prime Minister, Agim Çeku. Ahtisaari later told the press that the meeting resulted in no breakthroughs, but added that the discussion was "frank and candid" and the atmosphere was better than he could have expected.

Ahtisaari briefed Contact Group foreign ministers on 20 September 2006, in New York City at a meeting chaired by U.S. Secretary of state Condoleezza Rice. At that meeting, the Contact Group released a press statement that reaffirmed its desire to work towards a negotiated settlement in the course of 2006 and also endorsed Ahtisaari's plans to develop a comprehensive proposal for a status settlement.

As the end of 2006 neared, and despite progress on technical matters, both parties remained diametrically opposed on the question of status itself.

=== 2007 ===
On 2 February 2007, Ahtisaari delivered to representatives in Belgrade and Pristina a draft status settlement proposal. The proposal covered a wide range of issues related to Kosovo's future, in particular measures to protect Kosovo's non-Albanian communities such as decentralization of government, protection of Serbian Orthodox Church heritage and institutional protections for non-Albanian communities, which would remain in place for at least three years. Whilst not mentioning the word "independence," the draft included several provisions that were widely interpreted as implying statehood for Kosovo. In particular, the draft Settlement would give Kosovo the right to apply for membership in international organizations, to create a Kosovo Security Force and adopt national symbols. Ahtisaari conducted several weeks of consultations with the parties in Vienna to finalize the Settlement, including a high-level meeting on 10 March 2007 that brought together the Presidents and Prime Ministers of both sides. After this meeting, leaders from both sides signalled a total unwillingness to compromise on their central demands (Kosovo Albanians for Kosovo's independence; Belgrade for continued sovereignty over Kosovo). Concluding that there was little hope of the two sides reconciling their positions independently, Ahtisaari said he would submit to the UN Security Council his own proposed status arrangements, including an explicit recommendation for the status outcome itself, by the end of March.

Most international observers believed that these negotiations would lead to Kosovo's independence, subject to a period of international supervision. Nevertheless, Russian President Vladimir Putin stated in September 2006 that Russia might veto a UN Security Council proposal on Kosovo's final status that applied different standards than those applied to the separatist Georgian regions of South Ossetia and Abkhazia. The Russian ambassador to Serbia asserted that Russia will use its veto power unless the solution is acceptable to both Belgrade and Kosovo Albanians.

In a survey carried out by the UNDP and published in March 2007, 96% of Kosovo Albanians and 77% of non-Serb minorities in Kosovo wanted Kosovo to become independent within present borders. Some 78% of the Serb minority wanted Kosovo to remain an autonomous province within Serbia. Just 2.5% of the ethnic-Albanians wanted unification with Albania. Separately, the UN refugee agency made contingency plans for up to 70,000 further Serbian refugees in the wake of any successful independence claim by Kosovo Albanians.

In early May 2007, European members of the UN Security Council, Germany and the United States circulated a draft UN Security Council resolution that would replace UN Security Council Resolution 1244, endorse Ahtisaari's proposals and end the UN administration of Kosovo after a transition period of 120 days. The US Permanent Representative to the UN said that the European/US draft had enough support in the Security Council to be adopted unless Russia chose to object. Whilst most observers had, at the beginning of the talks, anticipated independence as the most likely outcome, others suggested that a rapid resolution might not be preferable.

The Contact Group said that, regardless of the outcome of the present negotiations, a new International Civilian Office (ICO) will be established in Kosovo to take up the civil administration provided for under UNSCR 1244, supervise the implementation of any status settlement and safeguard minority rights. NATO leaders said that the presence of KFOR will be maintained in Kosovo after any status settlement. The EU will establish a European Security and Defense Policy Rule of Law mission to focus on the policing and justice sectors.

As of early July 2007 the draft resolution, backed by the United States, the United Kingdom and other European members of the United Nations Security Council, was rewritten four times to try to accommodate Russian concerns, and despite talks between the Presidents of Russia and the United States. Russia stated that it would not support any resolution which was not acceptable to both parties. Representatives of the states backing independence expressed hope that agreement can be found amongst the Security Council. One Western diplomat, quoted by a British newspaper, offered an opinion on the state of negotiations: "I wouldn’t say it was game, set and match to the Russians but it is game and set".

Whilst the draft resolution on Kosovo's status had yet to be endorsed by the Security Council, senior US officials had been suggesting that an agreement might be reached by 2008. The US assistant secretary of state for European affairs told delegates at a NATO conference in Croatia that he hoped that Kosovo's future could be resolved in the months leading up to the alliance's next summit meeting in Romania in April of that year. Were the draft resolution to fail, observers had been speculating that fresh talks between the parties might follow.

On Monday, 16 July 2007, after many weeks of discussions at the Security Council, Russia rejected a fifth draft of a Security Council resolution based on the Ahtisaari proposals. British and European Union officials suggested on 17 July 2007 that a final draft would be presented 'within days' in an effort to secure Russian support. European Union foreign policy chief proposed new talks between Belgrade and Kosovo Albanians if this final draft failed, lasting for a period of four months and under the guidance of the Contact Group of leading nations.

Concerns remain that a failure to secure a resolution favourable to Kosovo Albanian opinion might lead to violence in Kosovo, including in the period up to a possible election in November 2007. Kosovo newspaper Zeri suggested, Reuters reported, that Contact Group nations might be considering an international conference on Kosovo in September in Paris.

The United States, United Kingdom and other European members of the Security Council formally 'discarded' a draft resolution backing Ahtisaari's proposal on 20 July 2007, having failed to secure Russian backing. Kosovo Albanian leaders reacted by proposing unilateral independence for 28 November 2007, though the UN would be required to overrule any such action.

Recognition of any unilateral declaration of independence would likely be of central importance; though US officials have indicated that they might support such a move, European nations have argued against unilateral moves by either side. French foreign minister and former UN Kosovo chief, Bernard Kouchner, warned that a unilateral declaration would split the European Union over recognition of the independence, whilst US State Department spokesman Sean McCormack commented that, 'There is nothing to be gained by short-circuiting the diplomatic process that is under way.' Violence is feared in Kosovo should Kosovo Albanian demands for independence not be met.

Despite the deadlock, the European Union has already drawn-up plans to admit the province. A 72-member European Union delegation with 200 local support staff would have a mandate to oversee implementation of the UN plan. An EU chief representative would continue to perform the same duties as the SRSG, with veto power over government decisions and the authority to fire officials found obstructing the implementation of the UN Security Council resolution.

After being posted to the UN Kosovo Mission as a corruption fighter, James Wasserstrom was later dismissed after reporting misconduct of UN personnel in Kosovo.

=== 2008 ===
After the war ended, the UN Security Council passed Resolution 1244 that placed Kosovo under transitional UN administration (UNMIK) and authorized the KFOR, a NATO-led peacekeeping force. Almost immediately, returning Kosovo Albanians attacked Kosovo Serbs, causing some 200,000-280,000 Serbs and other non-Albanians to flee (note: the current number of internally displaced persons is disputed, with estimates ranging from 65,000 to 250,000).

According to Amnesty International, the presence of peacekeepers in Kosovo led to an increase in the trafficking of women for sexual exploitation.

On 17 February 2008, Kosovo declared independence; Kosovo Serb parliamentarians, boycotted the session. Serbian Prime Minister Vojislav Koštunica responded by stating, "Today, this policy of force thinks that it has triumphed by establishing a false state."

In August 2008 after the Kosovan Constitution came into play, the UN decided to cut staff levels by 70% during a UN reconfiguration in the country. Much of the UN powers in Kosovo were transferred to the Kosovan Government and the EU policing mission in Kosovo called the European Union Rule of Law Mission in Kosovo (EULEX).

=== Post-declaration of independence ===
Plans for the UNMIK to hand authority over to the EULEX mission after Kosovo's constitution was approved faltered as a result of Russian opposition to Kosovo's unilateral declaration of independence. The UN Secretary-General Ban Ki-moon decided to reconfigure the mission for a temporary period. Reportedly the UN will give way to the EU mission in Albanian areas, but retain control over police in Serb-inhabited areas and set up local and district courts serving minority Serbs. The move is in response to opposition to the EU presence in North Kosovo and other Serb-dominated areas.

In December 2008, the European Union Rule of Law Mission in Kosovo (EULEX) assumed most of UNMIK's roles, assisting and supporting the Kosovo authorities in the rule of law area, specifically in the police, judiciary and customs areas. As of March 2011, UNMIK's recent work includes the overseeing the liquidation and privatization of failed businesses.

Two United Nations Specialized Agencies, The World Bank and the International Monetary Fund, granted membership to Kosovo in July 2009. Membership with the World Bank, under the aegis of Ranjit Nayak, the World Bank Representative in Kosovo (since February 2007), has resulted in Kosovo being treated by the World Bank as its 186th member country instead of being under United Nations Security Council Resolution 1244.

== Criticism ==
The UNMIK has been criticized for failing to achieve many of its stated objectives and is widely resented by both Kosovo Serbs and Kosovo Albanians. After seven years of work (as of 2006):

- Key infrastructure is not reconstructed; specifically, electric distribution is still very problematic;
- The UNMIK created constitutional framework for Kosovo, while authorised to create only legal framework;
- The UNMIK has been slow to transfer competencies to the provisional Kosovo institutions;
- Ethnic violence has occasionally flared (most notably in March 2004);
- Corruption, including allegations of corruption within UNMIK, remains endemic;
- Human rights have been problematic, especially with Kosovo's minority communities;
- There has been a failure to eliminate parallel structures, insofar as health and education within the Kosovo Serbian community remain dependent on Serbian budgets;
- UNMIK has been accused of failing to implement an economic development strategy;
- The government of Serbia claims there are around 250,000 refugees and internally displaced persons (IDPs) from Kosovo, the vast majority of whom are Serbs, who still do not feel safe returning to their homes.
- Amongst other things, according to SC Resolution 1244, Serbia is authorised to send a specific amount of its troops back into Kosovo. The UNMIK so far has prevented Serbia from doing so, thus in fact breaching the resolution.
- Since the establishment of the United Nations Mission in Kosovo (UNMIK) in 1999, according to some international organizations Kosovo has become a major destination country for women and young girls trafficked into forced prostitution. There have also been allegations that the presence of UN/NATO peacekeeping troops helps "fuel the sex trafficking trade." According to Amnesty International, most of these women are trafficked from Moldova, Bulgaria and Ukraine.
- On 10 February 2007 UN police fired rubber bullets at unarmed demonstrators in Pristina, killing two and injuring 82. The Chief Constable resigned; however, the police unit that fired the rubber bullets returned to Romania, where it has not been investigated. Meanwhile, in Pristina, UNMIK arrested and detained the demonstration organiser, Albin Kurti of VETËVENDOSJE! (Albanian for self-determination). He remained in detention without trial until July 2007 and was subsequently placed under house arrest. Amnesty International has criticised UNMIK's conduct of his prosecution.

In June 2005, a BBC article suggested that the European Roma Rights Centre were to sue UNMIK over the treatment of Roma refugees.

In July 2006, a book, Peace at Any Price: How the World Failed Kosovo, written by two former senior staffers at UNMIK, outlined errors made by the institution between 1999 and 2006.

== See also ==
- United Nations Administered Kosovo
- Autonomous Province of Kosovo and Metohija
- European Union Rule of Law Mission in Kosovo
- International Civilian Representative for Kosovo
- Kosovo Force (KFOR)
- Kosovo Property Agency
- Kosovo War
- List of territories governed by the United Nations
- Provisional Institutions of Self-Government
- Republic of Kosovo
- Republic of Serbia
- Special Team Six – UNMIK's multinational police tactical unit
- Standards for Kosovo
- United Nations Security Council Resolution 1244
- United Nations Transitional Administration in East Timor, a similar mission that administered East Timor between 1999 and 2002
- UNMIK Travel Document
