= Lamberto Zannier =

Italian diplomat

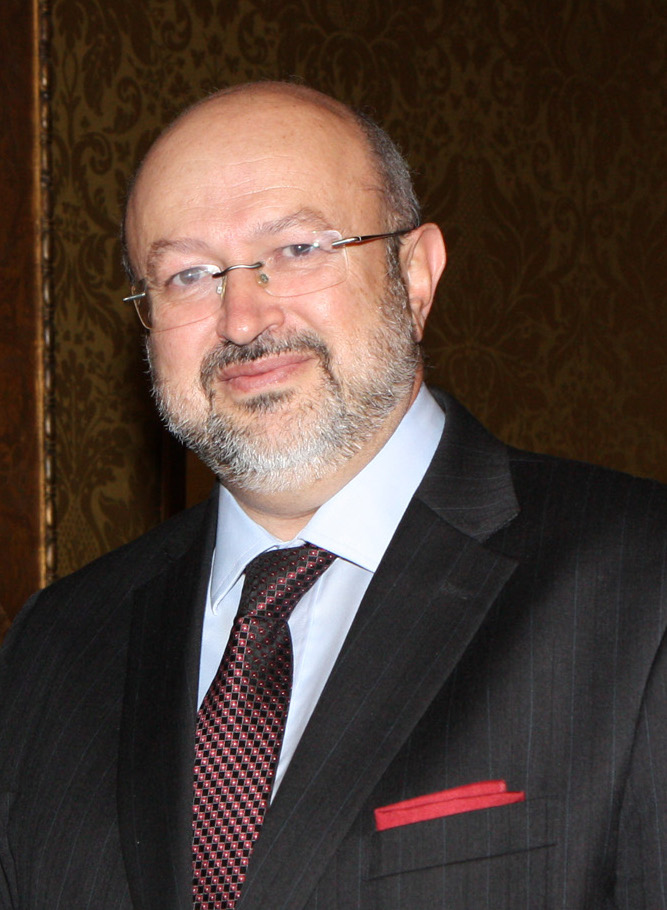

High Commissioner on National Minorities at the Organization for Security and Co-operation in Europe
- In office 19 July 2017 – 18 July 2020
- Preceded by: Astrid Thors
- Succeeded by: Kairat Abdrakhmanov

Secretary General of the Organization for Security and Co-operation in Europe
- In office 1 July 2011 – 1 July 2017
- Preceded by: Marc Perrin de Brichambaut
- Succeeded by: Thomas Greminger

7th Special Representative of the Secretary-General for Kosovo
- In office 20 June 2008 – 30 June 2011
- Preceded by: Joachim Rücker
- Succeeded by: Farid Zarif

Personal details
- Born: 15 June 1954 (age 72) Fagagna, Italy

Lamberto Zannier (born 15 June 1954) is an Italian diplomat with rank of Ambassador and lawyer.

== Biography ==
He was OSCE High Commissioner on National Minorities in The Hague and earlier served as the Secretary General of the OSCE in Vienna for two terms from July 2011 to July 2017 (Organization for Security and Co-operation in Europe). In this capacity, among numerous other activities, he initiated the deployment of the OSCE Special Monitoring Mission to Ukraine, the largest civilian monitoring operation in the OSCE history, in March 2014. He also initiated a process of informal dialogue through the so-called OSCE Security Days and established a Network of Academic Institutions focusing on the role of the OSCE in promoting security and stability in Europe. From 2020 he served as a High-Level Expert with the OSCE Parliamentary Assembly, facilitating a parliamentary dialogue on current issues, with the aim of relaunching the role of the Organization in view of the 50th Anniversary of the establishment of the CSCE, and with a strong focus on the implications of the conflict in Ukraine after February 2022.

Previously, from June 2008 to June 2011, Zannier was the United Nations Special Representative for Kosovo and Head of the United Nations Interim Administration Mission in Kosovo (UNMIK), with the rank of UN Undersecretary-General. He was appointed to this position by UN Secretary-General Ban Ki-moon in June 2008. In this capacity, he held, on behalf of the Secretary General, a negotiation between Belgrade and Pristina, which resulted in an agreement on Kosovo (unanimously endorsed, for the first time in a decade, by the UN Security Council) which opened the door for the deployment of a EU rule of law mission (EULEX). Between 2002 and 2006, he was Director of the Conflict Prevention Centre of the Organization for Security and Cooperation in Europe in Vienna. In this capacity, he managed more than 20 civilian field operations in Europe and Central Asia.

Zannier has served for the Foreign Service of Italy for almost 40 years. Before his appointment as Special Representative of the UN Secretary-General for Kosovo, he played a leading role at the Italian Ministry of Foreign Affairs as a coordinator for EU Foreign Policy and as a Coordinator for EU Security and Defence issues.

From 2000 to 2002, he was Representative of Italy to the Executive Council of the Organisation for the Prohibition of Chemical Weapons in The Hague. From 1997 to 1999, he was chairperson of the negotiations on the adaptation of the Treaty on Conventional Armed Forces in Europe, which led to the signing of the adapted Treaty by the Heads of State and Government of all Treaty Parties at the 1999 OSCE Istanbul Summit From 1991 to 1997, he served as Head of Disarmament, Arms Control and Cooperative Security at the North Atlantic Treaty Organization. Previously, he had postings in Rome, Abu Dhabi and Vienna, mainly specializing in multilateral and security affairs. He has authored several publications on security, conflict prevention and crisis management issues. He routinely holds lessons and conferences on international relations and international security. In 2021 he was appointed Director for Euro-Mediterranean Diplomacy and Intercultural Affairs at the International Institute for Middle East and Balkan Studies (IFIMES), focusing on regional stability and cooperation. From 2021 to 2023 he was a visiting professor at the University of Trento (Italy), teaching at a Master Course on Conflict Human Rights and Natural Resources under International Law at the School of International Studies (IMSISS and MEIS).

Zannier obtained a law degree and an honorary degree in international and diplomatic sciences from the University of Trieste.

In 2024 he was appointed by the OSCE to head its long-term observer team for the 2024 2 June Serbian local elections and in 2025 for the 11 May Albanian parliamentary election.

== Honors ==
Grand Officer of the Order of Merit of the Italian Republic – October 10, 2016

Grand Officer of the Order of Orange-Nassau of the Kingdom of the Netherlands

Großes Goldenes Ehrenzeichen mit dem Stern (Grand Officer 1st Class) of the Republic of Austria
