= Standards for Kosovo =

National standards and technical regulations of Kosovo

The Standards for Kosovo are a set of UN-endorsed benchmarks for the democratic development of Kosovo. They cover eight key areas of development and include a particular focus on the protection of Kosovo non-Albanian ethnic communities. The Standards address issues of related to functioning democratic institutions, rule of law, rights of communities, returns of displaced persons, the economy, dialogue with Belgrade, property rights and the Kosovo Protection Corps.

In 2003, the international community articulated a policy of "Standards before status," whereby it was decided that Kosovo's status would not be addressed until it had met these Standards of good governance. To meet these goals, Kosovo's Provisional Institutions of Self-Government (PISG) created a series of working groups that met regularly to speed progress on the Standards. In 2005, a UN-commissioned report by Norwegian diplomat Kai Eide assessed that further progress on the Standards would not be possible until Kosovo had clarity about its future status.

In 2006, as the Kosovo Status Process was underway, the government of Kosovo (part of the PISG) began to transition its work on the Standards into the more demanding process of meeting standards for European integration as part of the Stabilization and Association Process Tracking Mechanism (STM).
