= Farid Zarif =

UN special representative (born 1951)

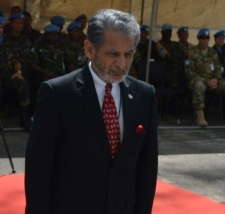
- Farid Zarif in 2016 in Liberia.

8th Special Representative of the Secretary-General for Kosovo
- In office 3 August 2011 – 31 August 2015
- Preceded by: Lamberto Zannier
- Succeeded by: Zahir Tanin

Personal details
- Born: 1951 Kabul, Kingdom of Afghanistan

Farid Zarif (Persian: فرید ظریف; born 1951, in Kabul, Afghanistan) was United Nations Secretary-General Ban Ki-moon’s Special Representative and head of the United Nations Interim Administration Mission in Kosovo (UNMIK). In August 2015, he was promoted to the level of United Nations Under-Secretary-General and appointed as Special Representative of the United Nations Secretary-General to Liberia and Coordinator of the United Nations Operations in Liberia (UNMIL).

== Career ==
Zarif has extensive experience in diplomatic, international and United Nations affairs. During his diplomatic service, he served in various positions inside and outside Afghanistan, including as Permanent Representative to the United Nations in New York from 1981 to 1987; Deputy Foreign Minister from 1987 to 1989; and Presidential Adviser on International Affairs from 1989 to 1991.

Having joined the United Nations in 1993, Mr. Zarif has since served at Headquarters in New York as well as in political, humanitarian and peacekeeping operations in Eritrea, Liberia, South Africa, Iraq and Sudan in various capacities, including Chief of Section, Director of Division, Deputy Humanitarian Coordinator and Chief of Staff. He was appointed Director of the Europe and Latin America Division in the Office of Operations, Department of Peacekeeping Operations, in August 2010, and served as Acting Special Representative of the Secretary-General in Kosovo since August 2011.

Mr. Zarif graduated from Kabul University's Faculty of Law and Political Science in 1973, and entered the Ministry of Foreign Affairs the following year. After graduating with honours from the Afghan Institute of Diplomacy, he studied international relations and diplomacy at Oxford University in the United Kingdom.
