= Political status of Kosovo =

Political status of a disputed territory in the Balkans

The political status of Kosovo, also known as the Kosovo question, is the subject of a long-running political and territorial dispute between the Serbian government and the Government of Kosovo, stemming from the breakup of Yugoslavia (1991–92) and the ensuing Kosovo War (1998–99). In 1999, the administration of the Autonomous Province of Kosovo and Metohija was handed on an interim basis to the United Nations under the terms of UNSCR 1244, which ended the Kosovo conflict of that year. That resolution reaffirmed Serbia's territorial integrity over Kosovo but required the UN administration to promote the establishment of 'substantial autonomy and self-government' for Kosovo, pending a 'final settlement' for negotiation between the parties.

The UN-sponsored talks began in February 2006, and though no agreement was reached between the parties, a proposal from UN Special Envoy Martti Ahtisaari was presented in May 2007, which recommended 'supervised independence' for the province. After several weeks of discussions at the United Nations General Assembly in New York, the representatives of the United States, the United Kingdom, and other European members of the United Nations Security Council formally 'discarded' a draft resolution backing the Ahtisaari Plan on 20 July 2007, as they had failed to secure Russian backing.

On 17 February 2008, representatives of the people of Kosovo, acting outside the frameworks of the Provisional Institutions of Self-Government (PISG) established by the UN governance mission, issued a declaration of independence, formally establishing the Republic of Kosovo as a sovereign and independent country. While Kosovo's declaration of independence was subsequently brought before the International Court of Justice, the latter eventually ruled that the declaration did not violate international law, arguing that the signatory authors represented the expression of the nationwide will of the People of Kosovo, rather than the Assembly of Kosovo under the umbrella of UN resolution 1244.

== Background ==
=== Status in the Kingdom of Yugoslavia ===
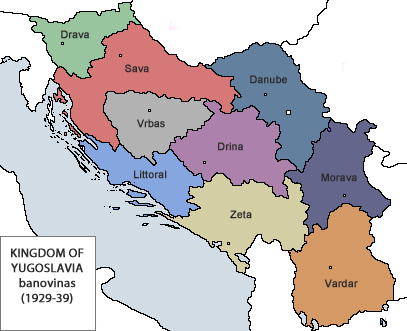
Map showing banovinas (Yugoslav provinces) in 1929. Kosovo is shown as part of the Zeta and Vardar banovinas.

Following the Balkan Wars (1912–13) and the Treaties of London and Bucharest, which led to the Ottoman Empire's loss of most of the Balkans, Kosovo was governed as an integral part of the Kingdom of Serbia, while the Kingdom of Montenegro governed its western part, known as Metohija. In 1918, Montenegro was united with Serbia, first becoming an integral part of the Kingdom of Serbia, and shortly thereafter, under Serbian rule, joined the Kingdom of Serbs, Croats and Slovenes (KSHS), recognized in 1919 and 1920 at the Paris Peace Conference and the League of Nations, and gaining a Constitution in 1921. Demonstrations from Kosovo Albanians demanding union with the Principality of Albania were suppressed by the Royal Yugoslav Army. In 1922, the historical entities were abolished by a state commission, and 33 new administrative oblasts (regions) ruled from the centre were instituted. In 1926, the border dispute with the Albanian Republic was resolved with most of the Gora region remaining within the Kingdom of Yugoslavia.

In 1929, the Kingdom (renamed formally to "Yugoslavia") was restructured into nine large provinces called banovinas (banates), formalized by a new Constitution in 1931. Their borders were intentionally drawn so that they would not correspond either to boundaries between ethnic groups or to pre-World War I state borders. Most of Kosovo was allocated to the Zeta Banate and smaller bits to the Moravian and Vardar Banates.

=== Status in Communist Yugoslavia ===
The first Constitution of the Federative People's Republic of Yugoslavia (later renamed the Socialist Federal Republic of Yugoslavia, SFRY) established Kosovo-Metohija and the northern region of Vojvodina as autonomous provinces within the People's Republic of Serbia. It also promoted the Vardar region of southern Serbia to the status of a separate republic, the People's Republic of Macedonia. The constitution, adopted on 31 January 1946, stated that "The People's Republic of Serbia includes the autonomous province of Vojvodina and the autonomous Kosovo-Metohijan region." It did not spell out the rights and scope of the autonomous provinces, instead stating that this was a matter to be "determined by the constitution of the [parent] republic."

The later Constitution of the SFRY, adopted on 7 April 1963, again provided for republics to "found autonomous provinces in accordance with the constitution in areas with distinctive national characteristics or in areas with other distinguishing features, on the basis of the express will of the population of this area." Within the Socialist Republic of Serbia, "there are the autonomous provinces of Vojvodina and Kosovo and Metohija, established in 1945 by the decision of the People's Assembly of the People's Republic of Serbia in accordance with the express will of the population of these areas." The details of the rights and scope of the provinces were, again, reserved to the republics' constitutions.

The 1974 Yugoslav Constitution, at the time the world's longest, greatly changed the constitutional setup within Yugoslavia. It increased the autonomy of Kosovo and Vojvodina, and gave both autonomous provinces de facto veto power in the Serbian and Yugoslav parliaments, as changes to their status could not be made without the consent of the two Provincial Assemblies. It also granted equal status to the Serbian, Albanian, and Turkish languages and alphabets within Kosovo.

The 1974 Serbian constitution, adopted at the same time, reiterated that "the Socialist Republic of Serbia comprises the Socialist Autonomous Province of Vojvodina and the Socialist Autonomous Province of Kosovo, which originated in the common struggle of nations and nationalities of Yugoslavia in the National Liberation War [the Second World War] and socialist revolution...." The separately promulgated Constitution of the Socialist Autonomous Province of Kosovo declared that:

The Socialist Autonomous Province of Kosovo is an autonomous, socialist, democratic, socio-political, and self-managing community of working people and citizens, equal Albanians, Montenegrins, Serbs, Turks, and members of other nations and nationalities and ethnic groups, based on the power of and self-management by the working class and all working people. The Socialist Autonomous Province of Kosovo is a part of the Socialist Republic of Serbia and the Socialist Federal Republic of Yugoslavia.

During the 1980s, the moderate Serbian communist politician Ivan Stambolić, who became President of Serbia, urged the other republics to agree to a reduction in provincial autonomy.

Stambolić managed to win over the League of Communists of Yugoslavia (SKJ) to his position on this matter at the 13th Congress of the SKJ, held in 1986, and then established a commission to work out the details of constitutional reforms. However, Stambolić was deposed by his erstwhile protégé, Slobodan Milošević, in 1987, who had used the issue of Kosovo to boost his political support.

=== Under Slobodan Milošević ===
The much harder-line Milošević pushed for a tougher policy towards the Kosovo Albanians. On 28 March 1989, he had the Serbian Constitution amended to give the Serbian Assembly exclusive rights to decide on the constitutional structure of the country, overturning the veto right of Kosovo and Vojvodina. According to a disproven claim in the ICTY indictment of Milošević, when the proposed amendments were put before the Kosovo Assembly, the majority of the Assembly's members abstained in protest, and the vote failed to reach the necessary two-thirds supermajority. The speaker of the Assembly nonetheless declared that the amendments had passed and they were duly enacted. The ICTY indictment was refuted in court by Vukašin Jokanović, who was the president of the Kosovo Assembly at the time during the trial. He provided the court with a video recording of the vote along with the stenographic notes of the assembly session, which clearly showed the assembly members voting in favour of the constitutional amendments by the required majority.

The following year, a new Serbian Constitution was enacted, drastically reducing the powers of the autonomous provinces, while reserving many formerly autonomous rights to the central authorities in Belgrade. Furthermore, it also changed back the name of Kosovo from the Socialist Autonomous Province of Kosovo to the Autonomous Province of Kosovo and Metohija, returning the province to the status predating the 1970s and using the Serbian name for the western part of the region.

The 1990 constitution was strongly resisted by Kosovo's Albanians, who set up a "shadow" government to parallel the official Serb-dominated establishment. The Albanian-dominated Kosovo Assembly passed an unofficial resolution declaring Kosovo an independent entity within Yugoslavia, equivalent in status to the existing republics. However, a few days later, on 5 July 1990, the Serbian parliament formally dissolved the Kosovo Assembly, alongside declaring all its laws invalid, and transferring its legislative functions back to the Belgrade legislature. On 22 September 1991, the deposed Albanian members of the Kosovo Assembly held a secret meeting in Pristina, where they proclaimed Kosovo as a sovereign and independent state, officially named the "Republic of Kosova." Despite their efforts, the country failed to achieve diplomatic recognition by the international community, with the neighboring Albania being the only country to recognize the Republic of Kosovo's independence.

Additionally, despite formally recognizing Croatia and Slovenia's declarations of independence, which took place in 1991, in the aftermath of both countries' independence referendums, the international community nevertheless refused to extend diplomatic support to Kosovo's independence, arguing in favor of upholding the existing borders of the individual republics of Yugoslavia. On 10 October 1991, the CSCE (now the Organization for Security and Co-operation in Europe) warned that member states would "never ... recognize any changes of borders, whether external or internal, brought about by force." The United States, the European Community, and the Soviet Union issued a joint statement on 18 October 1991 reaffirming these principles.

The same set of principles remained the cornerstone of international policy towards the former Yugoslavia throughout the Yugoslav wars. Thus, for instance, the international community insisted on retaining Bosnia and Herzegovina and Croatia as unified states, denying recognition to the breakaway Republika Srpska and Republic of Serbian Krajina.

Following the breakup of Yugoslavia, Serbia and Montenegro formed the Federal Republic of Yugoslavia.

== Status and the Kosovo War ==
Kosovo's status was a key issue in the political violence that presaged the Kosovo War of 1999. The ethnic Albanian Kosovo Liberation Army was formed in the early 1990s, and began targeting Serbian Police and Yugoslav Army in 1996.

The international community also did not support independence for Kosovo at this stage. The United Nations Security Council passed UN Security Council Resolution 1160 on 31 March 1998 urging the parties to reach a peaceful settlement and rejecting any unilateral attempts to redraw borders, instead "affirming the commitment of all Member States to the sovereignty and territorial integrity of the Federal Republic of Yugoslavia." The same principles were reaffirmed in a high-level meeting during the 1999 NATO bombing campaign when the G8 foreign ministers adopted a policy of establishing "an interim administration for Kosovo ... under which the people of Kosovo can enjoy substantial autonomy within the Federal Republic of Yugoslavia".

On 2 June 1999, a joint Finnish-Russian team headed by then Finnish president Martti Ahtisaari presented a set of proposals to President Milošević. These included a commitment to establish "an interim political framework agreement providing for substantial self-government for Kosovo, taking full account of the Rambouillet accords and the principles of sovereignty and territorial integrity of the Federal Republic of Yugoslavia and the other countries of the region." Under severe pressure from the ongoing NATO bombing, Milošević agreed to withdraw Yugoslav forces from Kosovo and permit the establishment of an UN-led administration in the province, with security to be provided by a NATO-led force (KFOR).

=== Interim United Nations administration of Kosovo ===
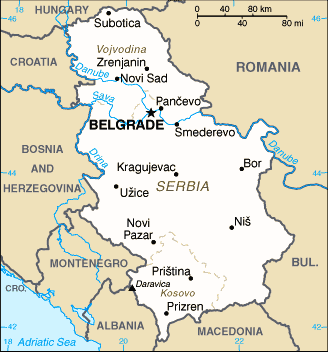
US Central Intelligence Agency map of Serbia as of June 2006, including the autonomous provinces of Vojvodina (north) and Kosovo (south)

Kosovo's constitutional status of the period June 1999-February 2008 was established by the United Nations in UN Security Council Resolution (UNSCR) 1244, adopted on 10 June 1999. The Security Council placed Kosovo under the temporary administration of the United Nations Mission in Kosovo (UNMIK), under the leadership of a Special Representative of the Secretary General. It also explicitly upheld the existing sovereignty of Serbia over Kosovo, "reaffirming the commitment of all Member States to the sovereignty and territorial integrity of the Federal Republic of Yugoslavia and the other States of the region, as set out in the Helsinki Final Act and annex 2 [the Finnish-Russian proposals]." It also established a requirement that the post-conflict status process must take full account of "the principles of sovereignty and territorial integrity of the Federal Republic of Yugoslavia."

In a public speech on 9 June 1999, President Slobodan Milošević declared:

We have not given up Kosovo. The Group of Eight most developed countries of the world and the United Nations guarantee the sovereignty and territorial integrity of our country. This guarantee is also contained in the draft resolution. The Belgrade agreement has closed the open issues of the possible independence of Kosovo at the time prior to the aggression. The territorial entirety of our country cannot be threatened ... the political process, which will be based on the principles which stem from previously conducted discussions [is] also equally based on the sovereignty and territorial integrity of our country. This means that only autonomy, and nothing else outside that, can be mentioned in this political process.

The reality on the ground was rather different, as Ylber Hysa has noted. Although "Resolution 1244 respects the sovereignty and territorial integrity of the Federal Republic of Yugoslavia, including Kosovo", and even provided for Serbian troops to be stationed in the province, on the ground "certain territories are under the full control of KFOR and the international administration" without any Serbian involvement. However, this part of the resolution was never implemented. The severely circumscribed control exercised by Serbia in Kosovo has led many commentators to describe the nature of its sovereignty as purely "nominal".

William G. O'Neill comments that the resolution's wording was also intended "to reassure Republic of Macedonia, which has a substantial Albanian minority, that its territorial borders were not at risk. It also can be seen as a warning to Albania not even to think about any territorial expansion to create a 'greater Albania'."

On 15 May 2001, UNMIK enacted a "Constitutional Framework for Provisional Self-Government." Although it provides a constitutional framework, it is not a constitution, and is deliberately nonjudgmental on the question of sovereignty, as UNMIK itself does not have a role in the determination of Kosovo's final status. It defines Kosovo as "an entity under interim international administration" and "an undivided territory."

Crucially, Kosovo's own institutions were specifically barred from making any unilateral decisions about the province's status. The Constitutional Framework states that the Provisional Institutions of Self-Government (PISG) "shall not in any way affect or diminish the ultimate authority of the SRSG [Special Representative of the Secretary General] for the implementation of UNSCR 1244". The Kosovo Assembly is in effect prohibited to make any decisions or declarations on the future status of Kosovo There are no Ministers for Foreign Affairs or Defence as these functions are reserved to the authority of the SRSG. UNMIK eventually approved the creation of Ministries of Justice and Internal Affairs in late 2005, but noted that the establishment of the ministries was not linked to the question of Kosovo's final status.

The 2003 Constitution of the newly created state of Serbia and Montenegro officially acknowledged Kosovo's new interim status, describing Serbia and Montenegro as "the state of Montenegro and the state of Serbia which includes the Autonomous Province of Vojvodina and the Autonomous Province of Kosovo and Metohija, the latter currently under international administration in accordance with UN SC resolution 1244." In 2006, Serbia drafted a new constitution that again referred to Kosovo as an integral part of Serbia.

UNMIK was given exclusive rights to manage Kosovo's economic affairs and stated its intent in the Constitutional Framework to establish a market economy. Prior to 1999, much of Kosovo's economy had been controlled by the state. All publicly owned enterprises were owned by the Yugoslav government or the Serbian state, both governed from Belgrade. When UNMIK began implementing privatization of assets that it did not own, Serbs with interests in the companies subject to privatization sued first UNMIK and then the UN in New York.

=== Resolution 1244 ===
United Nations Security Council Resolution 1244, passed in 1999, reaffirmed in its preamble the "commitment of all Member States to the sovereignty and territorial integrity of the Federal Republic of Yugoslavia" and authorised "an international civil presence in Kosovo in order to provide an interim administration for Kosovo under which the people of Kosovo can enjoy substantial autonomy within the Federal Republic of Yugoslavia", i.e. the United Nations Interim Administration Mission in Kosovo (UNMIK), with security provided by a NATO-led Kosovo Force (KFOR). The Resolution also authorised a process to determine Kosovo's final status. Concerning the latter, Annex 1 to the Resolution states that the "political solution to the Kosovo crisis" should take "full account of ... the principles of sovereignty and territorial integrity of the Federal Republic of Yugoslavia".

== Status process (2006–2008) ==
=== Initial UN-backed talks (2006) ===
The UN-facilitated Kosovo future status process was led by UN Special Envoy Martti Ahtisaari, former president of Finland; Austrian diplomat Albert Rohan is his deputy. Ahtisaari's office — the UN Office of the Special Envoy for Kosovo (UNOSEK) — is located in Vienna, Austria, and includes liaison staff from NATO, the EU and the United States. Ahtisaari is supported in his efforts by Ambassador Frank G. Wisner, the U.S. Representative to the Kosovo Status Talks. Ahtisaari holds regular meetings with representatives of the Contact Group.

The initial status negotiations focused on technical issues important for Kosovo's long-term stability, particularly the rights and protection of Kosovo's minorities (especially the Kosovo Serbs). Ahtisaari brought the parties together for the first direct dialogue in February 2006 to discuss decentralization of local government, which is an important measure to protect Kosovo Serb communities. Subsequent meetings addressed economic issues, property rights, protection of Serbian Orthodox Church heritage and institutional guarantees for the rights of Kosovo's minorities.

On 24 July 2006, Ahtisaari brought the parties together in Vienna for the first high-level talks on the status outcome itself. Serbian President Boris Tadić, Prime Minister Vojislav Koštunica, Kosovo President Fatmir Sejdiu and Prime Minister Agim Çeku attended and presented their respective platforms for Kosovo's future status. Ahtisaari later told the press that the meeting resulted in no breakthroughs, but added that the discussion was "frank and candid" and the atmosphere was better than he could have expected.

Ahtisaari briefed Contact Group foreign ministers on 20 September 2006, in New York City at a meeting chaired by U.S. Secretary of State Condoleezza Rice. At that meeting, the Contact Group released a press statement that reaffirmed its desire to work towards a negotiated settlement in the course of 2006 and also endorsed Ahtisaari's plans to develop a comprehensive proposal for a status settlement. After consultations with the Contact Group in Vienna on 10 November, Ahtisaari decided to delay sharing his proposal with the parties until after Serbia held parliamentary elections on 21 January 2007. He said he would take his proposal to the parties "without delay" after these elections.

=== Continued discussions ===
On 3 April, Ahtisaari presented to the UN Security Council his final package of proposals, which included a clear recommendation that Kosovo should become independent subject to a period of international supervision.

Pristina accepted Ahtisaari's final Settlement, while Belgrade rejected it. Immediately after the proposals became public, the United States and Germany (in its capacity as EU Presidency) issued strong statements of support. The European Parliament also declared its full support to Ahtisaari's plan. Russia, however, called for new rounds of negotiations, possibly with a new special envoy. At least one other member of the Security Council, South Africa, a non-permanent member, has expressed agreement with Russian concerns.

On 11 May, European members of the UN Security Council, Germany and the United States circulated a draft UN Security Council resolution that would replace UN Security Council Resolution 1244, endorse Ahtisaari's Settlement and end the UN administration after a transition period of 120 days. The U.S. Permanent Representative to the UN said that the European/U.S. draft had enough support in the Security Council to be adopted unless Russia chooses to use its Security Council veto, which Russia has stated at numerous occasions that it might use unless the resolution is acceptable by both sides.

Russia rejected a UN Security Council resolution based on the Ahtisaari Plan. As discussions progressed in the week of 16 July, seemingly with little hope of agreement, EU foreign policy chief Javier Solana was quoted as saying that the European Union would cease supporting efforts to agree a resolution backing the Ahtisaari plan 'within days' if Russian concerns could not be met. Russia had rejected another draft resolution on Monday 16 July which had called for further talks between Serbia and Kosovo Albanians, describing the draft as 'permeated with the concept of the independence of Kosovo'. British Deputy Head of Mission in New York, Karen Pierce, told reporters on 17 July that a final draft of the resolution would be introduced 'within 36 hours'.

According to news service Reuters, Solana had said that a further, four-month period of talks would be conducted under the authority of the Contact Group, though did not discount that a resolution might still be agreed in the coming days. German Chancellor Angela Merkel appeared to support renewed talks between the parties after discussions with Serbian Prime Minister Vojislav Koštunica, 'We are now thinking about whether it would be possible to support a phase of negotiations between Belgrade and Pristina to try once again to find a solution,' Merkel was quoted as saying.

The United States, United Kingdom and other European members of the Security Council formally 'discarded' a draft resolution backing Ahtisaari's proposal on 20 July 2007, having failed to secure Russian backing.

The UN Secretary-General later endorsed another time-limited round of negotiations led by a U.S./EU/Russian Troika of negotiators. The Troika completed its work on 10 December 2007, without having achieved an agreement between the parties on Kosovo's status.

On 22 January 2008 the Parliamentary Assembly of the Council of Europe (PACE) adopted a resolution calling for the continuation of talks on the basis of UNSC Resolution 1244.

=== Ahtisaari Plan ===
UN-backed talks on the status of Kosovo, led by UN Special Envoy Martti Ahtisaari, began in February 2006 with the aim of completing them by the end of that year. Whilst progress was made on technical matters, both Kosovo and Serbia remain diametrically opposed on the question of status itself. Prime Minister of Kosovo's Provisional Institutions, Agim Çeku stated that his government would accept nothing less than independence and would not contemplate partition. On the part of Serbia, Prime Minister Vojislav Koštunica stated Serbia would give Kosovo full autonomy but could not accept independence. The position of the Contact Group of leading nations is that Kosovo "must remain multi-ethnic and the settlement must be acceptable to the people of Kosovo. Additionally, there will be no return of Kosovo to the pre-1999 situation, no partition of Kosovo and no union of Kosovo with any other, or part of another, country." While not yet mentioning the word "independence," the draft Settlement included several provisions that were widely interpreted as implying statehood for Kosovo. For example, the draft Settlement would give Kosovo the right to apply for membership in international organizations, create a Kosovo Security Force and adopt national symbols. Ahtisaari said that after a period of consultations with the parties he would finalize his Settlement proposal for submission to the UN Security Council and at that stage he would also elaborate on the status issue itself.

In February 2007, Ahtisaari delivered a draft status settlement proposal to leaders in Belgrade and Pristina, the basis for a draft UN Security Council Resolution which proposes 'supervised independence' for the province. As of early July 2007 the draft resolution, which is backed by the United States, United Kingdom and other European members of the Security Council, had been rewritten four times to try to accommodate Russian concerns that such a resolution would undermine the principle of state sovereignty. The United States called the proposal "fair and balanced," while the EU Presidency noted that Ahtisaari's proposals "build on almost twelve months of direct talks between Belgrade and Pristina." Russia, which holds a veto in the Security Council as one of five permanent members, stated that it will not support any resolution which is not acceptable to both Belgrade and Pristina.

In Belgrade, Serbian Prime Minister Vojislav Koštunica refused to receive Ahtisaari. Koštunica claimed that because Serbia had still not formed a new government after the 21 January parliamentary elections he had no mandate to discuss Kosovo and therefore could not meet Ahtisaari. Nevertheless, he later denounced the proposal as "illegitimate and unacceptable" because he alleged it "violates the U.N. Charter ... by undermining the sovereignty of U.N. member Serbia." President Boris Tadić did receive Ahtisaari, after which he reaffirmed his vow to never accept an independent Kosovo. Foreign Minister Vuk Drašković warned that it was "necessary to avoid an imposed solution that could cause Serbia to become a factor of instability."

After many weeks of discussions at the UN, the United States, United Kingdom and other European members of the Security Council formally 'discarded' a draft resolution backing Ahtisaari's proposal on 20 July 2007, having failed to secure Russian backing. Kosovo Albanian leaders reacted by proposing unilateral independence for 28 November 2007, though the UN would be required to overrule any such action. In November 2008, the EU accepted the demand of Serbia not to implement the plan of Ahtisaari through EULEX.

=== Serbian constitutional referendum ===
A referendum on a proposed draft of the new Serbian constitution was held on 28 October and 29 October 2006 and has resulted in the draft constitution being approved by the Serbian electorate. The constitution is Serbia's first as an independent state since the Kingdom of Serbia's 1903 constitution. Over 6.6 million people were entitled to vote in the national referendum. Kosovo did not vote. During the nearly one-century of Serbian rule in Kosovo, this is the only attempt to legally incorporate Kosovo into Serbia, and it was seen by Albanians as an attempt to prejudge the result of the negotiations. In the preamble to the constitution it states that "Kosovo is an autonomous province of Serbia with significant autonomy". Serbian legal scholars found that this unambiguous statement means it would be unconstitutional for Kosovo to secede from Serbia.

=== Positions of the parties ===
- Serbia's position on the status of Kosovo is that Kosovo should enjoy substantial autonomy, but not be granted independence. Frequently dubbed "more than autonomy, less than independence," Belgrade's vision for Kosovo includes expanding autonomy in which Kosovo is largely free to govern itself, although Kosovo would not be permitted an independent role in international relations or defence and would remain nominally within the state of Serbia. The Serbian side has also proposed the One Country Two Systems formula, i.e. the "Hong Kong model" as a solution, but it was rejected by the Albanian politicians. Serbia argues that Kosovo's independence would be a violation of Serbia's sovereignty and territorial integrity and therefore contrary to the UN Charter and principles of international law. Belgrade also asserts the UNMIK has allowed widespread discrimination against Kosovo's Serb minority and has not facilitated the return of about 200,000 of internally displaced persons who fled Kosovo during and immediately after the conflict. Serbia insists that UNSCR 1244, which envisioned an UN-facilitated political process to determine status, precludes independence through a preambular reference to the sovereignty and territorial integrity of the Federal Republic of Yugoslavia (now Serbia). Serbian Prime Minister Vojislav Koštunica has said that '...any imposed solution that would seize part of our territory would be a violation of international law.'
- Kosovo Albanians generally assert that they could not remain within a Serbian state citing the repression by the Milošević government in the 1990s. Kosovo Prime Minister Agim Çeku claimed that "recognizing Kosovo's independence would close the dark chapters of Balkan history, and create the opportunity for a new and sustainable regional stability."
- In November 2005, the Contact Group countries released a set of "Guiding Principles" for the resolution of Kosovo's status. These principles notably included the requirement that there be no return to the situation prior to 1999 and that there be no change in Kosovo's borders (i.e., no partition of Kosovo) and no union of Kosovo with any neighbouring state. The same statement includes a call for all parties to refrain from unilateral steps and reject any form of violence. The Contact Group affirms that the final decision on the status of Kosovo should be endorsed by the UN Security Council. At a January 2006 meeting of foreign ministers, the Contact Group further declared that a settlement "needs, inter alia, to be acceptable to the people of Kosovo" and emphasized the need for the settlement to address the concerns of Kosovo's ethnic minorities. Russian President Vladimir Putin stated in September 2006 that the world must apply the same standards to the separatist Georgian regions of South Ossetia and Abkhazia as it does to the Serbian province of Kosovo, where many are seeking independence. He also added that Russia would not endorse any UN Security Council resolution which it felt compromised these rights.
- A NATO report on the question of Kosovo's status states that a region may have the right of secession in the case of foreign occupation or if the region is a colony of another nation. The NATO report claims, while mentioning disagreement on the interpretation, that a third condition exists when "a people whose right to internal self-determination has been thoroughly violated by a Government that does not represent the people" and suggests Kosovo qualifies under this condition. It concludes, while there is a case in favor of a right to secession for Kosovo, it rejects the right to secession in cases where regions are open to democratic mechanisms.

== Declaration of independence ==
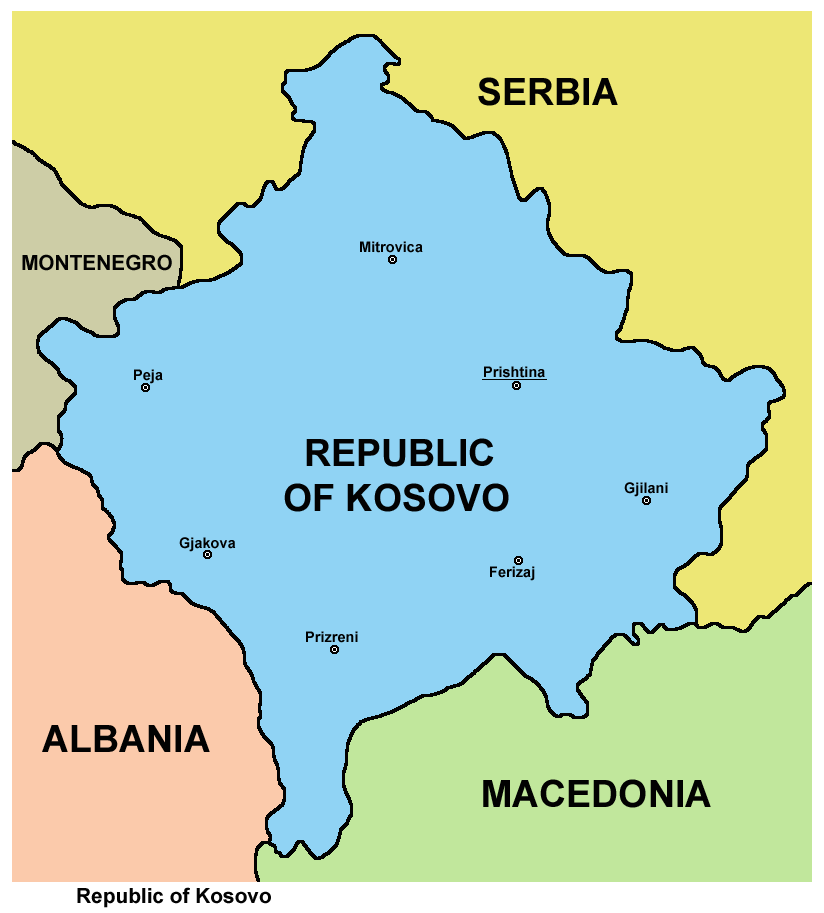
Map of the Republic of Kosovo, as proclaimed in 2008

Despite official UN and Russian disapproval, the US, UK, and France appeared likely to recognize Kosovar independence if it had been declared on 28 November 2007 or on 10 December 2007, the deadline for an agreement between Kosovo and Serbia set by UN Secretary General Ban Ki-moon. In February 2008, Hashim Thaçi said that about 100 countries were ready to immediately recognise Kosovo's independence after declaration.

On 17 February 2008, Kosovo declared independence. The Constitutional Court of the Republic of Serbia deemed this act illegal arguing it was not in coordination with the UN Charter, the Constitution of Serbia, the Helsinki Final Act, UN Security Council Resolution 1244 (including the previous resolutions) and the Badinter Commission. On 18 February 2008, the National Assembly of the Republic of Serbia declared Kosovo's declaration of independence as null and void per the suggestion of the Government of the Republic of Serbia.

The Constitution of Kosovo was proclaimed on 15 June 2008, and immediately denounced as illegal by Serbia.

=== International Court of Justice review ===
On 27 March 2008 Serbian Foreign Minister Vuk Jeremić said Serbia would request the International Court of Justice to review the legality of Kosovo's declaration of independence. On 8 October 2008 the UN General Assembly adopted Serbia's resolution requesting the International Court of Justice to assess the legality of Kosovo's declaration of independence. The United Nations General Assembly adopted this proposal on 8 October 2008 with 77 votes in favor, 6 votes against and 74 abstentions. On 22 July 2010 the court ruled that the declaration did not breach international law, because in general international law does not deal with declarations of independence and because in this specific case the declaration was not issued by the Assembly of Kosovo, Provisional Institutions of Self-Government, or any other official body and thus the authors, who named themselves "representatives of the people of Kosovo" were not bound by the Constitutional Framework (promulgated by United Nations Interim Administration Mission in Kosovo (UNMIK)) or by UNSCR 1244 that is addressed only to United Nations Member States and organs of the United Nations. Prior to the announcement Hashim Thaçi said there would be no "winners or losers" and that "I expect this to be a correct decision, according to the will of Kosovo's citizens. Kosovo will respect the advisory opinion." For his part, Serbia's President, Boris Tadić, warned that "If the International Court of Justice sets a new principle, it would trigger a process that would create several new countries and destabilise numerous regions in the world."

== Belgrade–Pristina negotiations ==
=== 2013 Brussels Agreement ===
After six months of negotiations between Serbia and Kosovo, led by the European Union a deal was reached on 19 April 2013. In exchange for limited autonomous powers for the Serb north, Serbia agreed not to block Kosovo's path to eventual membership of the EU.

== See also ==
- Kosovo–Serbia relations
- Administrative Boundary Line
- International recognition of Kosovo
- Partition of Kosovo
