= Zahir Tanin =

Afghan diplomat

H.E. Zahir Tanin
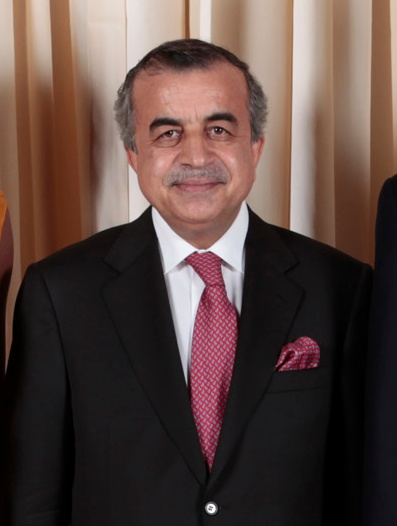

9th Special Representative of the Secretary-General for Kosovo
- In office 9 October 2015 – 19 November 2021
- Preceded by: Farid Zarif
- Succeeded by: Caroline Ziadeh

Permanent Representative to the United Nations for Afghanistan
- In office December 2006 – 5 October 2015
- Preceded by: Ravan A. G. Farhâdi
- Succeeded by: Mahmoud Saikal

Vice President to the United Nations General Assembly
- In office September 2008 – September 2009

Personal details
- Born: 1 May 1956 (age 70)
- Children: 2
- Education: Kabul Medical University

Abdul Zahir Tanin (Pashto: ظاهر طنين, Dari: ظاهر طنین; born 1 May 1956) is an Afghan diplomat who served as the Special Representative of the Secretary-General for Kosovo, and thus head of the UN Interim Administration Mission in Kosovo (UNMIK), from October 2015 to November 2021.

== Early career ==
Tanin graduated from Kabul Medical University in 1980. The same year, he began working as a journalist in Kabul. Since he was a member of the Afghan socialist/communist party, the People's Democratic Party of Afghanistan's Parcham faction, he joined the Haqiqat-e Inquilab-e Saur newspaper as the assistant editor-in-chief. Later, when the same Newspaper was rebranded as Akhbar-e-Haftah he became the editor-in-chief of the paper until 1992, co-editing Sabawoon Magazine until 1992 as well. During the same period, he also became the vice president of the Journalists' Union of Afghanistan from 1987 to 1992. From 1992 to 1993, he was a freelance writer in France.

He became a research fellow in international relations at the London School of Economics, working there from 1994 to 1996. He then worked for eleven years at the BBC World Service. He was a producer from 1995 to 2001, and then an editor until 2006; for Afghanistan and Central Asia until 2003, and then for Afghanistan in the Persian/Pashto section until 2006.

== United Nations ==
In December 2006, Tanin was appointed as the Permanent Representative to the United Nations for the Islamic Republic of Afghanistan. As Permanent Representative of Afghanistan, Tanin participated in meetings of the UN General Assembly as a member of his country's delegation and delivered statements on behalf of the Government of Afghanistan in the UN Security Council, UN General Assembly, and other events and panels both within and outside of the UN.

Tanin traveled to meetings around the world to represent his country, including the Rio +20 conference in June 2012, the 4th UN Conference on Least Developed Countries in Istanbul in June 2011, and as head of delegation in LDC conferences in Lisbon in 2010, in Delhi in 2011, and the Non-Aligned Movement Ministerial Meeting in Cuba in 2009. Tanin also served as vice president of the 63rd and 65th Sessions of the General Assembly, and during the 67th session on behalf of the Asian Group as acting president.

Tanin was appointed Vice-Chair of the Open-ended Working Group and Chair of the Intergovernmental Negotiations (IGN) on Security Council Reform during the 63rd General Assembly in 2008. He was reappointed to chair the ongoing negotiations during the 64th, 65th, 66th, 67th and 68th sessions. In this capacity he spoke at conferences, including Brazil and Rome in 2009, the Global Governance and Security Council Reform conference also in Rome, and the Doha Forum in May 2011.

On behalf of Afghanistan, Tanin was Vice Chair of the Committee on the Exercise of the Inalienable Rights of the Palestinian People from 2006 to 2015.

== Publications ==
- The Communist Regime in Afghanistan, published in Europe Asia Studies: a study of the political and social changes in Afghanistan from 1978 to 1992.
- Afghanistan in the Twentieth Century.
- The Oral History of Afghanistan in the 20th Century, a 29-part program broadcast by the BBC.
- Afghanistan on the World Stage, collected articles from December 2006 to September 2009.

== Personal life ==
Tanin is married to Dr Zarghoona Tanin and they have two children.

== See also ==
- List of current permanent representatives to the United Nations
