= United Nations Security Council Resolution 1244 =

1999 resolution establishing Kosovo's UNMIK

UN Security Council Resolution 1244
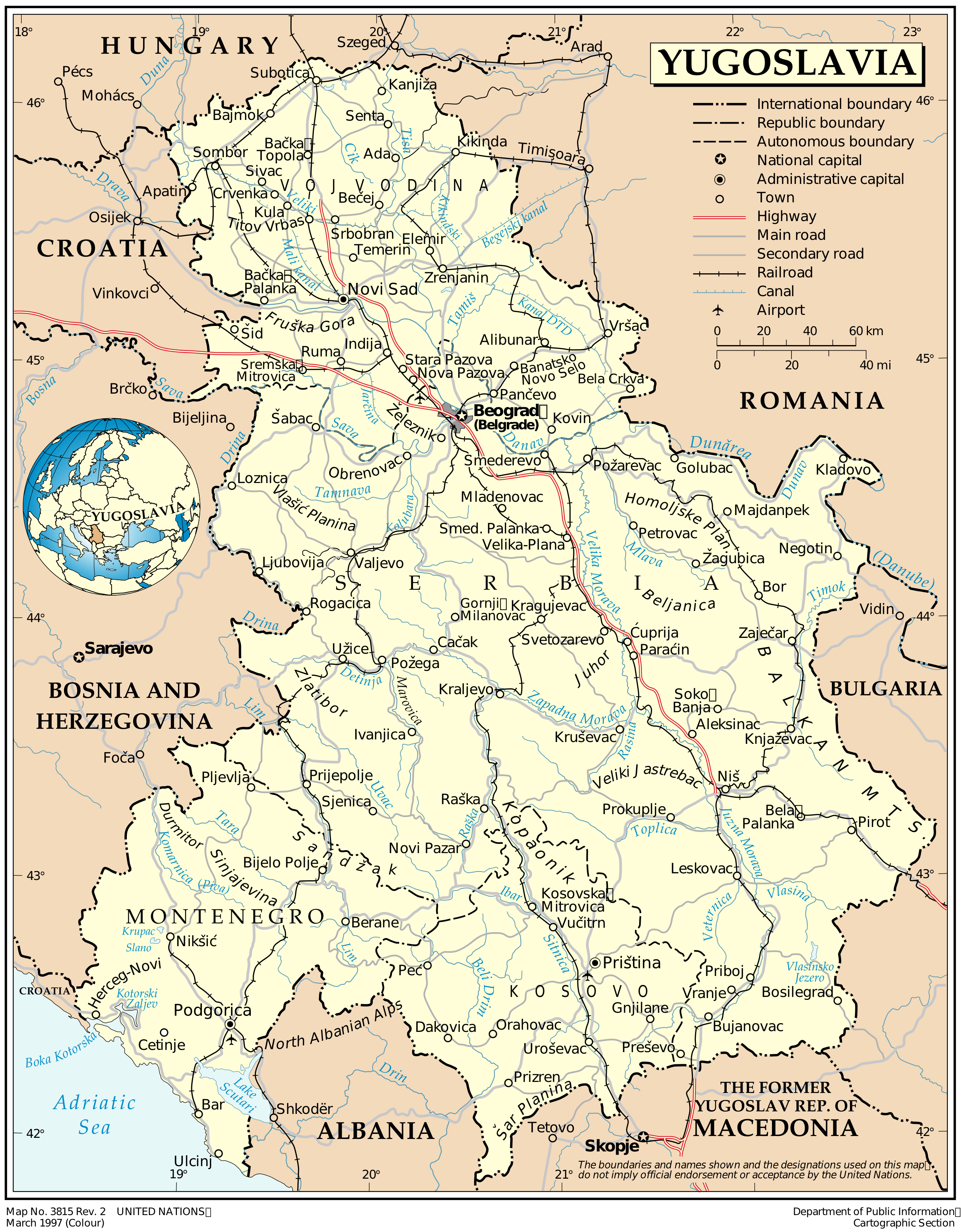
- Official UN map of FR Yugoslavia from 1997.
- Date: 10 June 1999
- Meeting no.: 4,011
- Code: S/RES/1244 (Document)
- Subject: The situation in Kosovo
- Voting summary: 14 voted for; None voted against; 1 abstained
- Result: Adopted

Security Council composition
- Permanent members: China; France; Russia; United Kingdom; United States
- Non-permanent members: Argentina; Bahrain; Brazil; Canada; Gabon; Gambia; Malaysia; Namibia; Netherlands; Slovenia

United Nations Security Council resolution 1244, adopted on 10 June 1999, after recalling resolutions 1160 (1998), 1199 (1998), 1203 (1998) and 1239 (1999), authorised an international civil and military presence in the Federal Republic of Yugoslavia and established the United Nations Interim Administration Mission in Kosovo (UNMIK). It followed an agreement by Yugoslav President Slobodan Milošević to terms proposed by President of Finland Martti Ahtisaari and former Prime Minister of Russia Viktor Chernomyrdin on 8 June, involving withdrawal of all Yugoslav state forces from Kosovo (Annex 2 of the Resolution). Annex 2 also specified that "After withdrawal, an agreed number of Yugoslav and Serbian personnel will be permitted to return to perform the following functions: · Liaison with the international civil mission and the international security presence; · Marking/clearing minefields; · Maintaining a presence at Serb patrimonial sites; · Maintaining a presence at key border crossings."

Resolution 1244 was adopted by 14 votes in favour to none against. China abstained despite being critical of the NATO offensive, particularly the bombing of its embassy. It argued that the conflict should be settled by the Yugoslav government and its people, and was opposed to external intervention. However, as the Federal Republic of Yugoslavia accepted the peace proposal, China did not veto the resolution.

Kosovo unilaterally declared its independence in 2008; Serbia and the majority of UN member states maintain that Resolution 1244 remains legally binding to all parties. In 2010, the International Court of Justice provided an advisory opinion that the declaration of independence did not violate the resolution.

== Resolution ==
=== Observations ===
In the preamble of Resolution 1244, the Security Council regretted that there had not been compliance with previous resolutions. It was determined to resolve the serious humanitarian situation and wanted to ensure that all refugees could safely return. It condemned violence against the civilian population as well as acts of terrorism, and recalled the jurisdiction and mandate of the International Criminal Tribunal for the former Yugoslavia (ICTY).

=== Acts ===
The resolution was enacted under Chapter VII of the United Nations Charter.

The Security Council decided that a solution to the Kosovar crisis was to be based upon the agreed principles contained in the annexes of the resolution. It welcomed Serbia's (then part of the "Federal Republic of Yugoslavia") acceptance of the principles and demanded co-operation in their implementation. At the same time, the Council demanded that Serbia put an end to repression in Kosovo and begin a phased withdrawal; after withdrawal a small number of Yugoslav and Serbian military and police personnel could return to Kosovo, if authorized by the international military presence, to carry out functions contained in the annex of the resolution.

The resolution then authorized an international civil and security presence in Kosovo. The Secretary-General was requested to appoint a Special Representative to co-ordinate the implementation of the international presence. The Council authorized countries and international organisations to establish a security presence in Kosovo, affirming the need for the immediate deployment of the international civil and security presences. The responsibilities of the international security presence included deterring new hostilities, monitoring the withdrawal of the Federal Republic of Yugoslavia, demilitarising the Kosovo Liberation Army and other Kosovo Albanian groups and ensuring a safe environment in which refugees could return.

The Secretary-General was authorized to establish an international civilian presence in Kosovo to provide an interim administration whereby Kosovo could exercise governance – pending a final status solution – through the establishment of provisional institutions of self-government. The main responsibilities of the international civil presence included the promotion of autonomy for Kosovo, performing civilian administrative functions, overseeing the development of the institutions including the holding of elections, maintaining law and order, protecting human rights and ensuring the safe return of refugees.

The Council emphasized the need for humanitarian relief operations and encouraged all states and organisations to contribute towards economic and social reconstruction. All parties, including the international presence, had to co-operate with the ICTY. It demanded that armed Kosovar groups end their offensives.

Finally, it was decided that the international civil and security presences were to be established for an initial period of 12 months, while the Secretary-General was requested to keep the Council informed on developments. Unusually for UN peace-keeping missions, this one was to continue after the initial 12-month period unless the Security Council determined otherwise: normally, the continuing mandate of missions is subject to resolutions after 12 months which allow for revisions to the original mandate.

=== Summary ===
The main features of Resolution 1244 were to:

- Demand in particular that the Federal Republic of Yugoslavia put an immediate and verifiable end to violence and repression in Kosovo;
- Complete verifiable phased withdrawal from Kosovo of all military, police and paramilitary forces according to a rapid timetable, with which the deployment of the international security presence in Kosovo will be synchronized;
- Place Kosovo under interim UN administration (performed by the United Nations Interim Administration Mission in Kosovo, UNMIK);
- Authorize international peacekeeping force with substantial NATO participation in Kosovo (currently performed by the Kosovo Force, KFOR);
- Allow for the return of an agreed number of Yugoslav and Serbian personnel to maintain a presence at Serbian Patrimonial sites and key border crossings;
- Direct UNMIK to establish provisional institutions of local self-government in Kosovo (PISG);
- Reaffirm the commitment of UN member states to the sovereignty and territorial integrity of the Federal Republic of Yugoslavia and the other States of the region, as set out in the Helsinki Final Act and annex 2 of UNSCR 1244 (an annex that both affirms the sovereignty of the Federal Republic of Yugoslavia and envisions, inter alia, a Kosovo status process);
- Require the UN to assure the safe and unimpeded return of all refugees and displaced persons to their homes in Kosovo and to ensure conditions for a peaceful and normal life for all inhabitants of the province;
- Require that the KLA and other armed Kosovo Albanian groups be demilitarized;
- Authorize the United Nations to facilitate a political process to determine Kosovo's future status. Kosovo's future status would take into consideration the Rambouillet Agreement which Serbia refused to sign in 1999, and which calls for the "will of the people of Kosovo" to be one of the guiding principles in defining Kosovo's status, another being the respective compliance of the disputing parties to the Agreement. The resolution reaffirms calls for "substantial autonomy and meaningful self-administration".

== Significance ==
=== Serbian stance ===
Article 1 of the Helsinki Final Act places a high value on the sovereignty and territorial integrity of existing states. In a similar fashion the references to autonomy in 1244 articles indicate a desire by UN Member-States at that time to return Kosovo to a pre-1990 autonomous status, if possible.

Serbia sought international validation for its stance, and in October 2008 requested a judgment from the International Court of Justice. However, the Court ruled that the declaration of independence was not illegal. The Serbian stance is that Resolution 1244 grants the authority to Serbia to have its police and military in the province. Serbia has therefore repeatedly requested from the UN high representatives in the province to allow the return of its police and military. As of 2026 this has not yet been allowed.

=== Kosovar stance ===
On 17 February 2008, representatives of the people of Kosovo, acting independently of the UNMIK's PISG framework (not representing the Assembly of Kosovo or any other of these institutions), issued a declaration of independence establishing the Republic of Kosovo.

== International Court of Justice advisory opinion ==
On 22 July 2010 the International Court of Justice provided advisory opinion on Kosovo's declaration of independence that the declaration of independence from 17 February 2008 did not violate Security Council resolution 1244 (1999) because the authors of the declaration, who named themselves "representatives of the people of Kosovo", were not bound by the document. Also, the ICJ did not rule on whether Kosovo had a right to independence.

== See also ==
- United Nations Administered Kosovo
- United Nations Interim Administration Mission in Kosovo
- Political status of Kosovo
- Kosovo War
- List of United Nations Security Council Resolutions 1201 to 1300 (1998–2000)
- Yugoslav Wars
- List of United Nations Security Council Resolutions related to the conflicts in former Yugoslavia
- List of territories administered by the United Nations
