= Caroline Ziadeh =

Lebanese diplomat

- كارولين زيادة

Special Representative of the UN Secretary-General for Kosovo and Head of UNMIK
- In office 17 January 2022 – 20 August 2025
- Preceded by: Zahir Tanin
- Succeeded by: Peter N. Due

Director of the Department of International Organizations, Conferences and Cultural Services of Lebanon
- In office 2017–2021

Deputy Permanent Representative of Lebanon to the United Nations
- In office 2006–2017

Personal details
- Born: Lebanon
- Education: Lebanese University; Université Libre de Bruxelles; Diplomatic Academy of Vienna
- Profession: Diplomat

Caroline Ziadeh (also spelled Ziadé, or Ziade; Arabic: كارولين زيادة) is a Lebanese diplomat who served as the Special Representative of the United Nations Secretary-General and Head of the United Nations Interim Administration Mission in Kosovo (UNMIK) since January 2022. Ziadeh previously served as Deputy Permanent Representative of Lebanon to the United Nations in New York from 2006 to 2017 and as Director of the Department of International Organizations, Conferences, and Cultural Services in Beirut from 2017 to 2021. Her earlier diplomatic assignments included overseas postings in Brussels, Vienna, and London. She was appointed to UNMIK by UN Secretary-General António Guterres in November 2021.

== Early life and education ==
Ziadeh holds both a Bachelor of Arts and a Master of Arts in Economy and Political Science from the Lebanese University in Beirut. She completed postgraduate diplomas at the Université Libre de Bruxelles in Brussels and the Diplomatic Academy of Vienna in Austria.

== Career ==
Ziadeh joined the diplomatic service of the Lebanese Ministry of Foreign Affairs and Emigrants in the early 1990s. From 1994 to 1999, Ziadeh was posted to Brussels, serving simultaneously at the Embassy of Lebanon in Belgium and the Delegation of Lebanon to the European Union. Following her term in Brussels, she was assigned from 1999 to 2002 to the Permanent Mission of Lebanon in Vienna, with concurrent accreditation to the Embassies of Lebanon in Austria, Croatia, and Slovakia. Between 2004 and 2006, she served as a diplomatic counselor at the Embassy of Lebanon in London.

In 2006, Ziadeh was named Deputy Permanent Representative of Lebanon to the United Nations Headquarters in New York, a post she held for eleven years. During her tenure in New York, Lebanon was elected as a non-permanent member of the United Nations Security Council for the 2010–2011 term. Ziadeh represented Lebanon in UN discussions on women, peace and security, migration, human rights, and sustainable development.

In 2017, Ziadeh was recalled to Beirut to assume the leadership of the Department of International Organizations, Conferences, and Cultural Services within the Lebanese Ministry of Foreign Affairs and Emigrants. She directed Lebanon's multilateral policies, multilateral treaty compliance, and engagement with international specialized agencies until late 2021.

=== Special Representative in Kosovo (2022–2025) ===
On 19 November 2021, UN Secretary-General António Guterres announced Ziadeh's appointment as Special Representative and Head of the United Nations Interim Administration Mission in Kosovo (UNMIK), succeeding Zahir Tanin of Afghanistan. She formally assumed her duties at UNMIK headquarters in Pristina on 17 January 2022. In a 2024 UN profile, Ziadeh described dialogue between communities, human rights and local peacebuilding as priorities of the mission. Ziadeh described peacekeeping as being concerned "not just about presence" but "purpose". Following the September 2023 security incident in Banjska, Ziadeh condemned the violence, called for restraint, and demanded thorough, transparent investigations to establish accountability. In her Security Council briefings, she highlighted the fragile security environment in northern Kosovo, expressing concern over administrative decisions, such as the closure of institutions supplying essential social and economic services, that impacted non-majority communities, particularly Kosovo Serbs.
