= Provisional Institutions of Self-Government =

Local administrative bodies in Kosovo established by the UN

- Institucionet e Përkohshme të Vetëqeverisjes (Albanian); Привремене институције самоуправе (Serbian); Privremene institucije samouprave (Serbian)
- Emblem

Overview
- Established: 4 March 2002
- Polity: Kosovo
- Website: Archived Website

The Provisional Institutions of Self-Government in Kosovo (PISG; Albanian: Institucionet e Përkohshme të Vetëqeverisjes në Kosovë, Serbian: Привремене институције самоуправе на Косову / Privremene institucije samouprave na Kosovu) are administrative bodies in Kosovo that were established by the United Nations Interim Administration Mission in Kosovo (UNMIK) during the period that the United Nations was directly responsible for the governance of Kosovo.

== History ==
Under the terms of UNSCR 1244, Kosovo came under the administration of the United Nations at the conclusion of Kosovo conflict of 1999. Kosovo is the subject of a long-running political and territorial dispute between the Serbian (and previously, the Yugoslav) government versus Kosovo's largely ethnic-Albanian population.

Resolution 1244 permitted the United Nations to establish and oversee the development of "provisional, democratic self-governing institutions" in Kosovo. The United Nations Administration established an internationally supervised Kosovo Police Service in 1999. A Joint Interim Administrative Structure was established in December 1999. In May 2001, UNMIK promulgated a Constitutional Framework which established these Provisional Institutions of Self-Government (PISG). The first elections for these institutions were held in November 2001. Following these elections UNMIK gradually transferred increased administrative competencies to the PISG.

Whilst UNSCR 1244 formerly stated Kosovo remained part of the then FR Yugoslavia (later Serbia), international negotiations began in 2006 to determine the final status of Kosovo.

On February 17, 2008, representatives of the people of Kosovo declared Kosovo's independence and subsequently adopted the Constitution of Republic of Kosovo, which came into effect on 15 June 2008.

== Structure ==
The Provisional Institutions comprised:

- The President of Kosovo, elected by the Assembly of Kosovo.
- The Assembly of Kosovo, made up of 120 members of which 10 seats are reserved for ethnic Serbs and 10 for other ethnic minority groups;
- The Cabinet of Kosovo, with a Prime Minister of Kosovo nominated by the President and endorsed by the Assembly;
- The Judicial System of Kosovo, which is appointed by the SRSG from a list endorsed by the Assembly after being proposed by the Judicial and Prosecutorial Council.

== See also ==
- European Union Rule of Law Mission in Kosovo (EULEX Kosovo)
- Joint Interim Administrative Structure
- Standards for Kosovo
