= Contact Group (Balkans) =

Informal group of governments

The Contact Group is the name for an informal grouping of great powers that have a significant interest in policy developments in the Balkans (an International Contact Group). The Contact Group is composed of United States, United Kingdom, France, Germany, Italy, and Russia.

== History ==
The Contact Group was first created in response to the war and the crisis in Bosnia in the early 1990s. The Contact Group includes four of the five Permanent Members of the UN Security Council and the countries that invest the heaviest in troops and involvement in the Balkans. Representatives of the EU Council, EU Presidency, European Commission and NATO generally attend Contact Group meetings.

The Contact Group has taken a major interest in the UN-led process to determine the future political status of Kosovo (i.e., whether it should be independent or remain a part of Serbia). The Contact Group meets regularly with UN Special Envoy Martti Ahtisaari, who has been charged with running the future status process.

=== 2006 Activity ===
On July 24, 2006, Contact Group representatives observed the first high-level meeting between the prime ministers and presidents of Kosovo and Serbia to discuss Kosovo's future status. A Contact Group statement issued after the meeting praised Kosovo for demonstrating flexibility in the technical talks underway in the Kosovo future status process, but urged Serbia to demonstrate more flexibility than it had so far.

Contact Group foreign ministers met in New York City on September 20, 2006, in New York City on the margins of the UN General Assembly. U.S. Secretary of State Condoleezza Rice chaired the meeting. After the meeting, the Contact Group issued a press statement restating the goal of achieving a negotiated settlement in the course of 2006.

== Structure ==
The Contact Group has no Secretariat or permanent staff—it is simply an informal grouping of countries that meets regularly at various levels to coordinate international policy initiatives in southeast Europe. Contact Group public statements, often negotiated to painstaking detail within the group, are considered to be significant statements of the international community's policy and intentions in the region. The Contact Group usually meets at the level of Balkans director (i.e., the highest-ranking diplomats in charge of the Balkans in each foreign ministry). Occasionally, however, the Contact Group meets at the level of Political Director or even Foreign Minister.

== See also ==
- Yugoslav Wars
- Kosovo status process
