= Joachim Rücker =

German diplomat

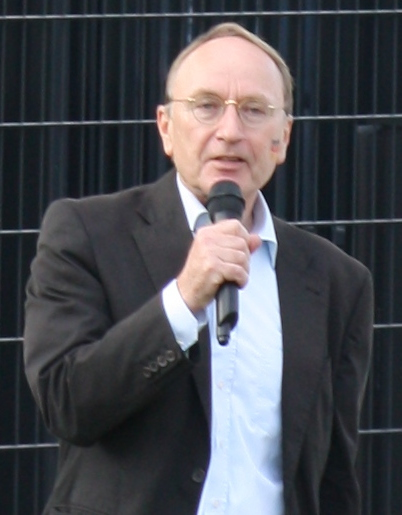

President of the United Nations Human Rights Council
- Preceded by: Søren Jessen-Petersen

Personal details
- Born: 30 May 1951 (age 75) Schwäbisch Hall, West Germany
- Occupation: Diplomat

Joachim Rücker (born 30 May 1951 in Schwäbisch Hall, Baden-Württemberg) is a German diplomat. He was the president of the United Nations Human Rights Council.

== Personal life ==
Rücker was born in 1951 in Schwäbisch Hall, Baden-Württemberg, Germany.

He has a doctoral degree in international economics.

== Career ==
Rücker previously served as a foreign policy adviser to the Social Democratic parliamentary group in the German Bundestag.

He was the Commissioner for Finance and Head of the Budget and Finance Division at the Federal Foreign Office in Berlin. Rücker also held various postings in the Federal Foreign Office in Bonn and German embassies abroad, including Dar es Salaam, Detroit (as Consulate-General) and Vienna. Additionally, he was the Ambassador and Deputy High Representative for Administration and Finance in the Office of the High Representative in Sarajevo, and the Mayor of the city of Sindelfingen in Germany.

From September 2006 to 20 June 2008, Rücker served as the Special Representative of the United Nations Secretary-General for Kosovo and the head of UNMIK. In November of that year, he was named Ambassador of Germany to Sweden.

=== President of the United Nations Human Rights Council, 2015 ===
In January 2015, Rücker was appointed the president of the United Nations Human Rights Council. He was the first German diplomat to be elected to the position.

On 3 July 2015, Rücker over-ruled the election of Katrin Nyman-Metcalf, the Estonian candidate ranked first by a "consultative group" of five ambassadors – from Poland, Chile, Greece, Algeria and chaired by Saudi Arabia – for the office of the United Nations' first special rapporteur on digital privacy after activist groups said she would not be a strong enough critic of U.S. surveillance. Instead, he proposed the second-ranked candidate instead, Joseph Cannataci of Malta. Germany and Brazil, whose governments were targets of U.S. surveillance, were the original initiators of the investigator post, approved unanimously by the 47 Council members in March 2015.
