= Søren Jessen-Petersen =

Danish lawyer and civil servant (born 1945)

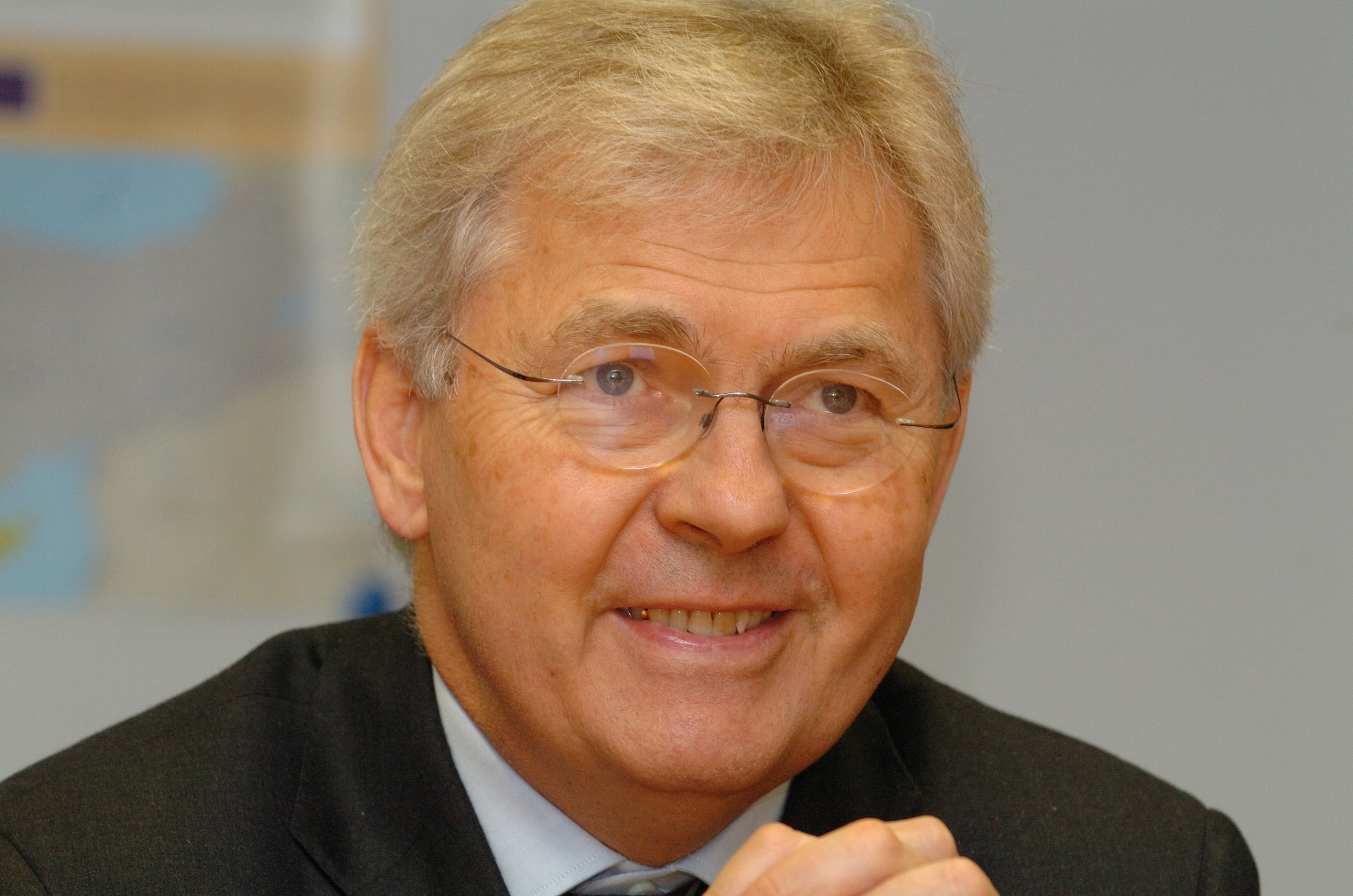
- Søren Jessen-Petersen in 2005
- Born: 1945 (age 80–81); Nørresundby, Denmark
- Occupations: Lawyer, civil servant

Søren Jessen-Petersen (born 1945) is a Danish lawyer and civil servant. He was named Special Representative of the United Nations Secretary-General for Kosovo and head of UNMIK on 16 July 2004. He held the position until the end of June 2006.

Jessen-Petersen is currently an adjunct professor of International Relations at the Johns Hopkins School of Advanced International Studies, where he teaches a course titled, "Economic Migrants, Refugees, and Human Security." He is also a Guest Scholar at the United States Institute of Peace (USIP).

A lawyer and journalist by training, Jessen-Petersen began his service in the United Nations (UN) in 1972 with the office of the UN High Commissioner for Refugees (UNHCR) in Africa. He then held senior positions at UNHCR before opening the UNHCR regional office in Stockholm in 1986. In 1989, he served as Special Adviser to the Under-Secretary-General for Political Affairs, and as a member of the Secretary-General's Task Force on Namibian independence. Between 1990 and 1993, Jessen-Petersen served as Chef de Cabinet of the High Commissioner for Refugees in Geneva while also serving as Director of External Relations (1992–1994). Between August 1994 and January 1998 he was Director of the UNHCR Liaison Office at the UN Headquarters in New York, while serving as the High Commissioner's Special Envoy to the former Yugoslavia, based in Sarajevo (December 1995 and September 1996). Jessen-Petersen served as Assistant UN High Commissioner for Refugees from January 1998 to December 2001.

He then served as the Chairman of the European Union Stability Pact's Migration, Asylum, Refugees Regional Initiative (MARRI), where he initiated and directed a strategy to manage population movements in the Western Balkans. Jessen-Petersen also chaired the MARRI Steering Committee. His most recent UN assignment was that of Special Representative of the UN Secretary-General in Kosovo and head of UNMIK (August 2004 to July 2006) at the level of UN Under Secretary-General.

Jessen-Petersen worked for the diplomatic advisory group Independent Diplomat, founded by Carne Ross, and is the former Director of its Washington office.

He currently resides in Copenhagen, Denmark.
