= 2019 Albania earthquake =

Earthquake in Northwestern Albania

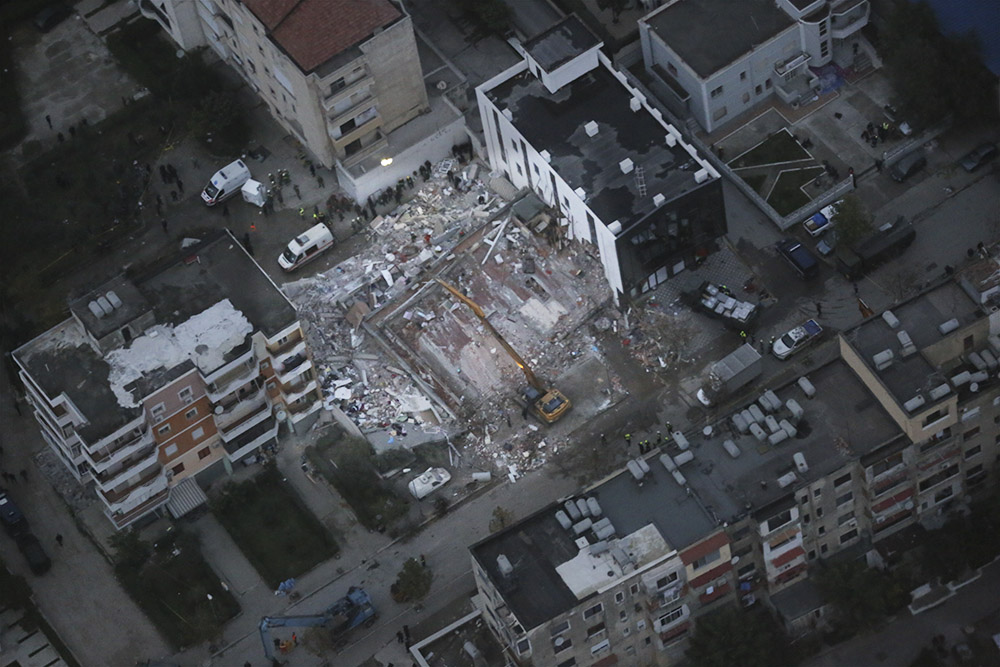
- A partially collapsed apartment in Durrës.

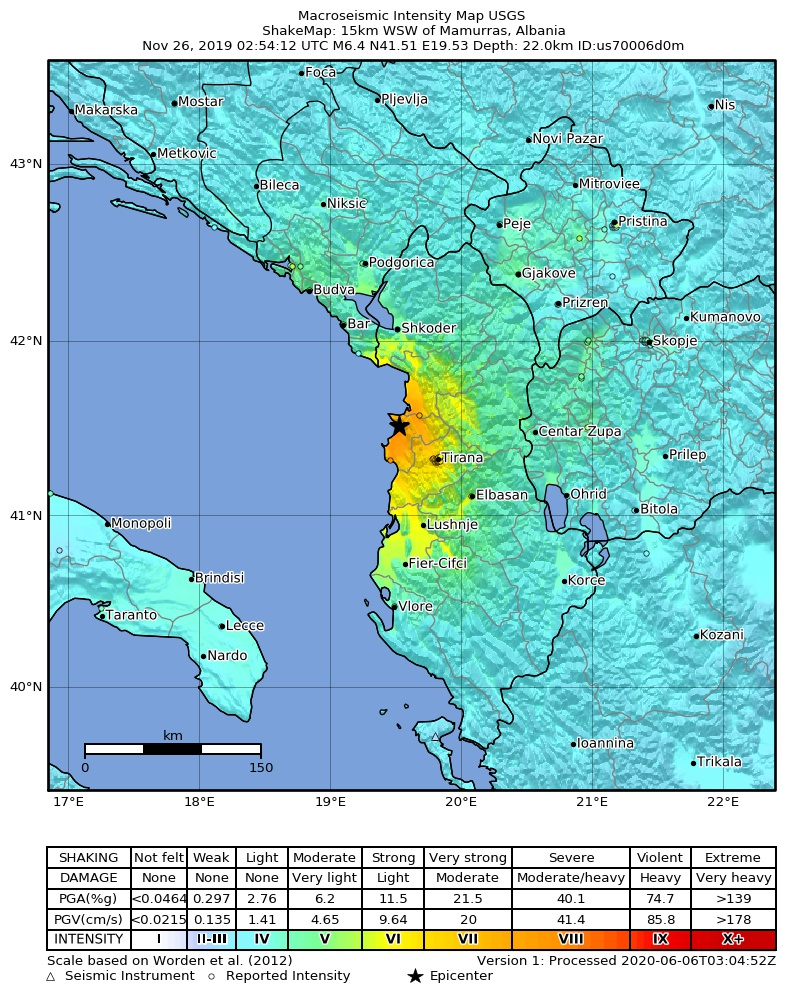
- USGS ShakeMap
- UTC time: 2019-11-26 02:54:12
- ISC event: 616919407
- USGS-ANSS: ComCat
- Local date: 26 November 2019
- Local time: 03:54:12 CET (UTC+1)
- Magnitude: 6.4 M_{w}
- Depth: 20.0 km (12.4 mi)
- Epicentre: 41.514°N 19.526°E
- Fault: Shijak Fault
- Type: Thrust
- Areas affected: Mamurras, Durrës, Kodër-Thumanë
- Total damage: 14,000+ buildings damaged/destroyed; €985 million (US$1.09 billion) in damage
- Max. intensity: MMI VIII (Severe)
- Peak acceleration: 0.5062 g
- Peak velocity: 43.01 cm/s
- Foreshocks: M_{w}5.6, 21 September 2019
- Aftershocks: 1,300 (by 1 December 2019); Five M_{w} ≥ 5.0 (by 27 January 2020); Forty-five M_{w} 4–4.9; (by 27 January 2020)
- Casualties: 51 dead Durrës: 25 dead Thumanë: 25 dead Lezhë: 1 dead; 3,000+ injured

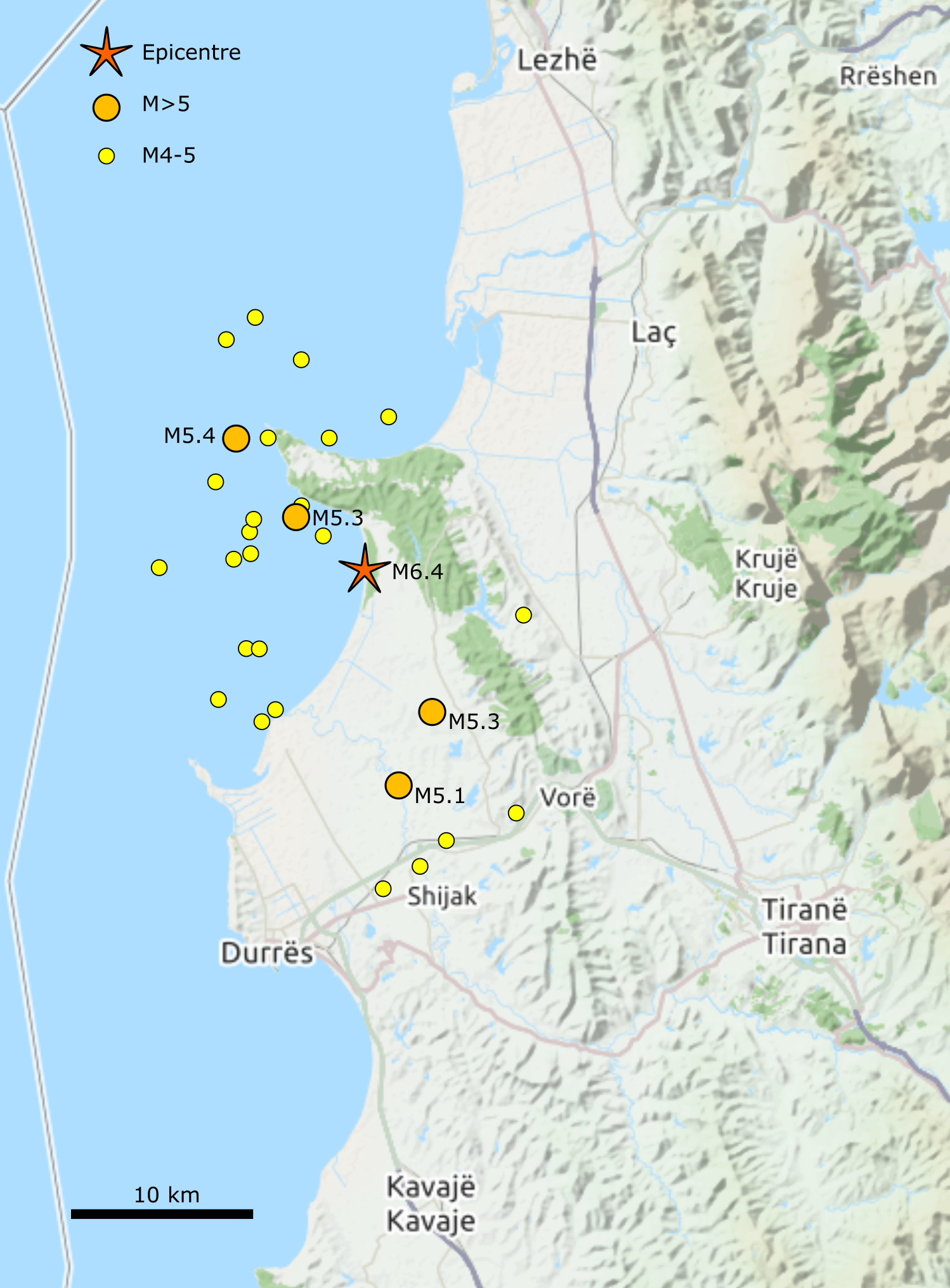
Location of epicentre and aftershocks in the first twenty days

On 26 November 2019 at 03:54 CET (UTC+1), northwestern Albania was struck by a magnitude 6.4 earthquake with an epicentre 16 kilometres (9.9 mi) west-southwest of Mamurras. The earthquake lasted at least 50 seconds and was felt in Albania's capital Tirana, and in places as far away as Bari, Taranto and Belgrade, 370 kilometres (230 mi) northeast of the epicentre. The maximum felt intensity was VIII (Severe) on the Modified Mercalli intensity scale. A total of 51 people were killed in the earthquake, with about 3,000 injured. It was the second earthquake to strike the region within three months. It was the strongest earthquake to hit Albania in more than 40 years, its deadliest earthquake in 99 years and the world's deadliest earthquake in 2019.

== Tectonic setting ==
Albania lies across the convergent boundary between the Eurasian plate and the Adriatic plate, part of the complex collision zone with the African plate. The structure of the western part of Albania is dominated by active thrust tectonics. The region is seismically active, with several M ≥ 6 earthquakes in the last hundred years. In 1979, the largest of these events struck 70 kilometres (43 mi) further north, in Montenegro, killing 136 people (101 in Montenegro and 35 in Albania).

== Earthquake ==
The earthquake had a magnitude of 6.4 M_{ww}, according to the ANSS Comprehensive Catalog. The observed focal mechanism is consistent with reverse movement on a NW-SE trending fault, parallel to the known thrust faults in the area. The maximum perceived intensity was VIII (severe) on the Modified Mercalli intensity scale (MMI). Modelling using a combination of data from the global navigation satellite system (GNSS) and interferometric synthetic-aperture radar (InSAR) provides further constraints on the fault that moved during the earthquake. This suggests that the rupture plane had a dip of 23° to the east-northeast at a depth of about 16.5 km. The estimated displacement on this thrust fault is 0.55 m over a rupture with dimensions 22 km x 13 km. The east-dipping Shirak Fault is considered the structure likely to be responsible for the earthquake. The mainshock was detected also via crowdsourcing by the European-Mediterranean Seismological Centre, where seismologists observed a surge in the LastQuake app launches and lately collected up to 58,125 reports on the event from the earthquake eyewitnesses.

=== Foreshocks ===
The largest foreshock was the M_{w}5.6 earthquake that occurred on 21 September 2019, with an epicenter approximately 20 km south of the mainshock, ENE of Durrës, which was at the time the most powerful in 30 years and damaged 500 houses. Two further foreshocks of M>4, were recorded with epicentres to the south, in the six hours before the mainshock.

=== Aftershocks ===
By 1 December, there had been 1,300 aftershocks. As of 02:00 (UTC) 27 January 2020, there had been five aftershocks that were greater than M 5.0 and a further forty-five between M 4 and 5. The largest aftershock occurred at 07:08 CET (UTC+1), less than four hours after the mainshock, with a magnitude of M 5.4. This event caused shaking of intensity VII (very strong).

Aftershocks of the 2019 Albania earthquake above M_{w} 4.0
Date	Time (UTC)	M	MMI	Depth	Ref.
26 November	02:59:24	5.1	–	10.0 km (6.2 mi)	
26 November	03:03:00	5.3	VII	10.0 km (6.2 mi)	
26 November	06:08:22	5.4	VII	10.0 km (6.2 mi)	
26 November	07:27:02	4.8	V	10.0 km (6.2 mi)	
26 November	12:14:13	4.4	–	10.0 km (6.2 mi)	
26 November	13:05:00	4.9	IV	10.0 km (6.2 mi)	
26 November	15:11:56	4.2	–	10.0 km (6.2 mi)	
26 November	17:19:13	4.7	VI	10.0 km (6.2 mi)	
27 November	11:03:35	4.1	III	10.0 km (6.2 mi)	
27 November	14:45:24	5.3	VI	12.6 km (7.8 mi)	
27 November	17:11:04	4.5	–	10.0 km (6.2 mi)	
27 November	22:19:00	4.3	III	10.0 km (6.2 mi)	
27 November	22:50:15	4.5	–	10.0 km (6.2 mi)	
27 November	22:51:24	4.4	–	10.0 km (6.2 mi)	
27 November	23:02:49	4.2	–	10.0 km (6.2 mi)	
28 November	00:50:09	4.4	–	10.0 km (6.2 mi)	
28 November	10:25:05	4.5	–	10.0 km (6.2 mi)	
28 November	10:52:42	4.9	IV	10.0 km (6.2 mi)	
28 November	20:33:24	4.4	II	10.0 km (6.2 mi)	
28 November	23:00:43	4.6	IV	10.0 km (6.2 mi)	
30 November	20:53:52	4.4	III	10.0 km (6.2 mi)	
1 December	06:04:19	4.2	–	10.0 km (6.2 mi)	
2 December	08:26:24	4.5	II	10.0 km (6.2 mi)	
2 December	23:23:00	4.5	–	10.0 km (6.2 mi)	
7 December	23:14:28	4.1	IV	10.0 km (6.2 mi)	
9 December	14:53:06	4.3	–	10.0 km (6.2 mi)	
9 December	14:58:59	4.4	IV	10.0 km (6.2 mi)	
9 December	15:04:57	4.1	–	10.0 km (6.2 mi)	
9 December	15:10:58	4.5	–	10.0 km (6.2 mi)	
15 December	01:18:36	4.3	IV	10.0 km (6.2 mi)	
17 December	04:14:32	4.4	–	10.0 km (6.2 mi)	
17 December	18:53:45	4.4	IV	15.9 km (9.9 mi)	
19 December	16:03:12	4.4	IV	17.2 km (10.7 mi)	
1 January	02:53:41	4.1	I	16.1 km (10.0 mi)	

=== Intensity ===
Modified Mercalli intensities in selected locations
MMI	Locations
MMI VIII (Severe)	Durrës
MMI VII (Very strong)	Tirana
MMI VI (Strong)	Elbasan
MMI V (Moderate)	Lushnje
MMI IV (Light)	Pristina

The earthquake was felt over a wide area, with intensities reaching VIII (Severe) in Durrës, VII (Very Strong) in the Albanian capital of Tirana and VI (Strong) in Elbasan.

== Damage ==
The damage was mostly in the large port city of Durrës and the village of Kodër-Thumanë, which are near the epicentre of the earthquake. Two hotels and two apartment blocks collapsed in Durrës. Four buildings, including a five-storey apartment block, collapsed in Kodër-Thumanë and the town was the hardest hit by the earthquake. The town of Laç was extensively damaged. A state of emergency lasting 30 days was declared by the Albanian government for Durrës, Thumanë and Tirana and later extended to Lezhë and Laç. In accordance with the Albanian constitution regarding an emergency situation, the Albanian parliament granted Prime Minister Edi Rama state of emergency powers to deal with the earthquake aftermath. Aftershocks followed that shook structures ruined during the earthquake and caused concern among locals. Subsequently, numerous homes were no longer safe to reside in.

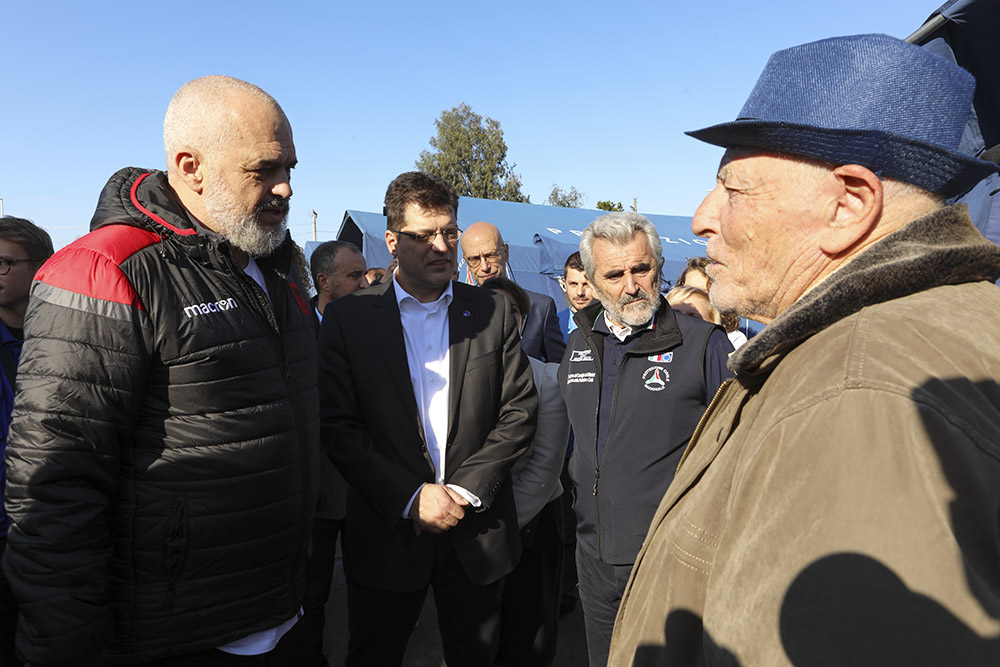
Prime Minister Edi Rama converses with a displaced person

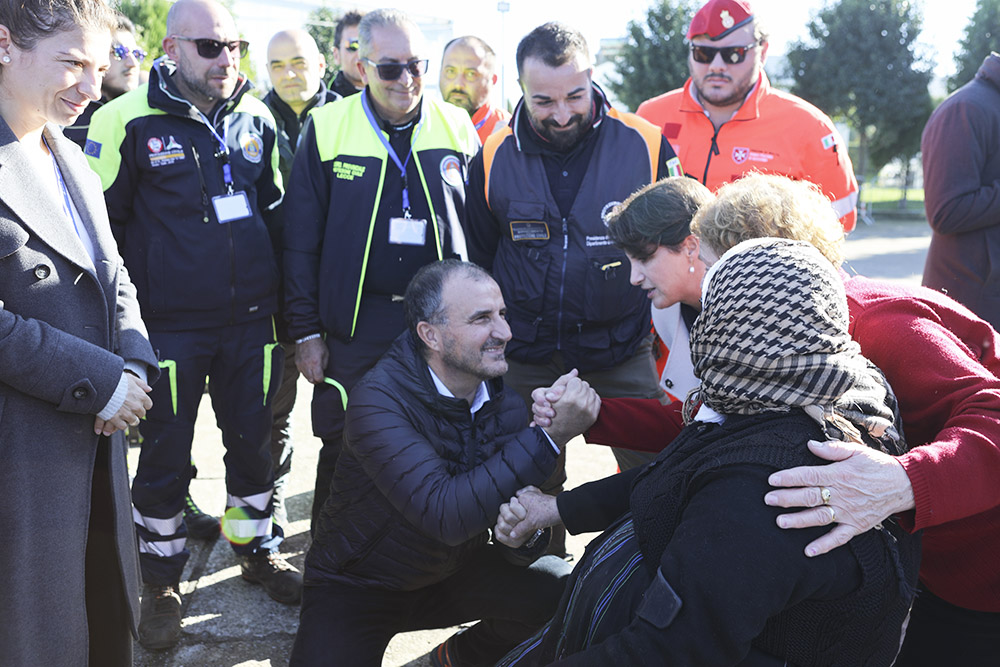
EU officials meeting displaced people

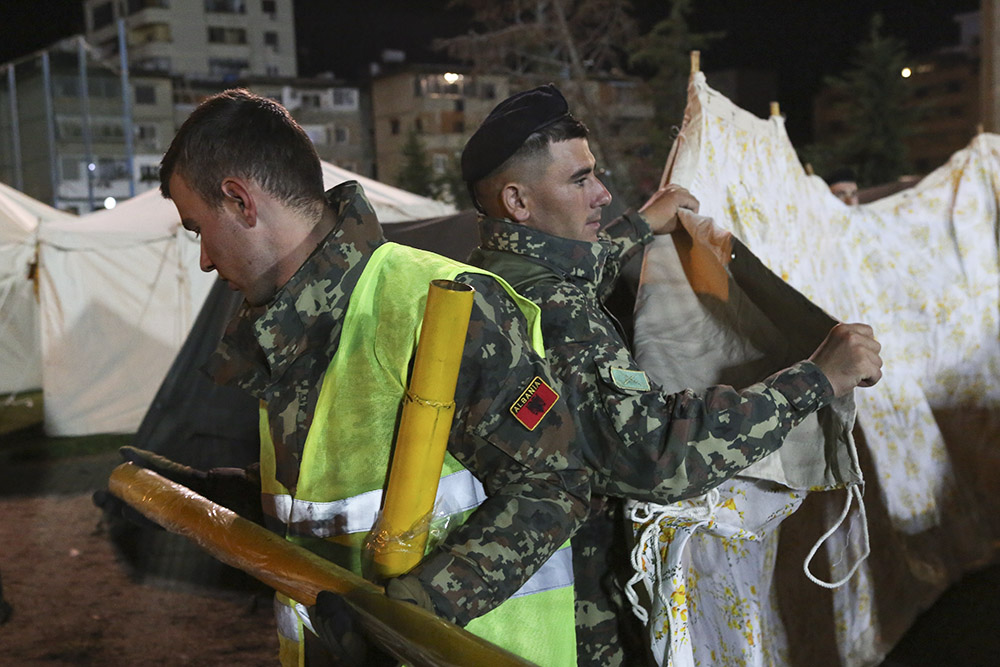
Members of the Albanian army involved in relief work

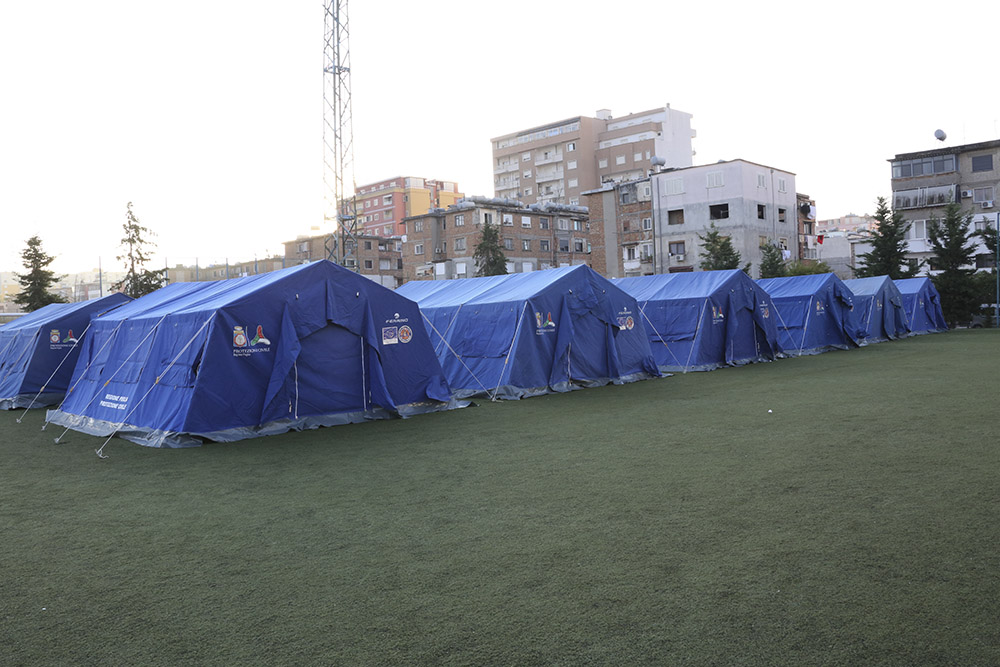
Emergency tents prepared for displaced people at the stadium in Durrës

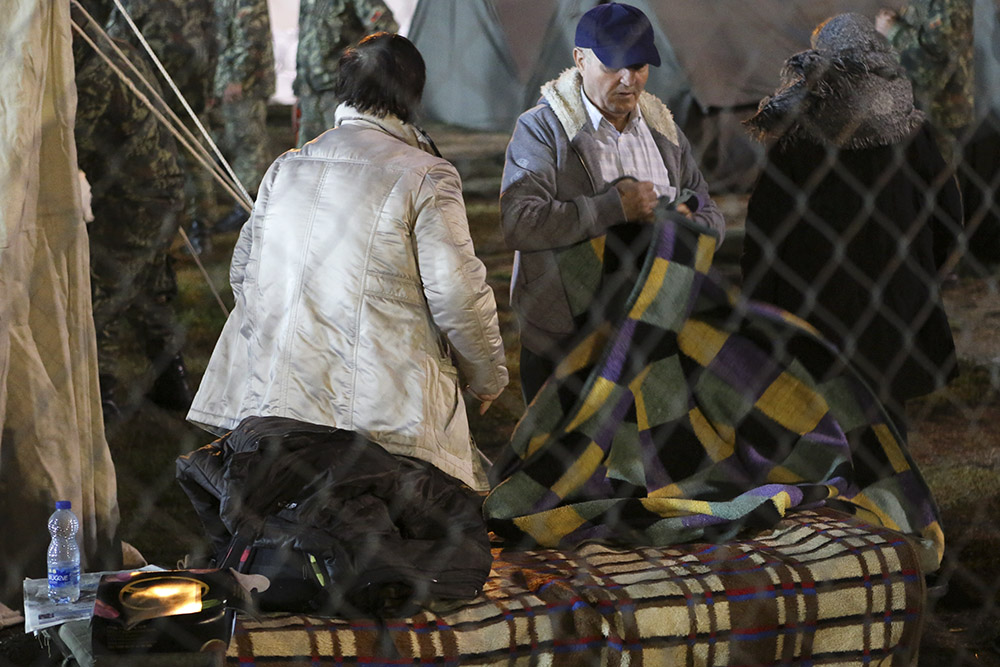
Displaced people housed in emergency tents

Albanian soldiers, numbering in the hundreds, and some 2,000 Albanian police officers were dispatched to the earthquake affected localities of Thumanë, Durrës, and the nearby wider area. They were tasked to assist with the rescue operation and the installation of shelter facilities for displaced people. Three hundred emergency tents to shelter some 1,000 people were erected at a sportsfield within Thumanë and close to a stadium in Durrës. Albanian troops working with limited resources rescued people from the debris of collapsed structures, and they were assisted by 250 troops from the United States and various European countries.

As the last severe earthquake in Albania was in 1979, it lacked expertise in rescue operations. Subsequently, rescue crews with specialised equipment, sniffer dogs and emergency supplies came to Albania from neighbouring countries and other European nations to help in the search efforts and provide for those left homeless. In total, people from foreign countries involved in search and rescue numbered 670. Many homeless people in Kodër-Thumanë spent two nights in tents, refusing to stay in hotels on the Adriatic Sea. Special forces (RENEA) continued searching for several people who were reported missing, and at least 45 individuals were rescued alive from the rubble.

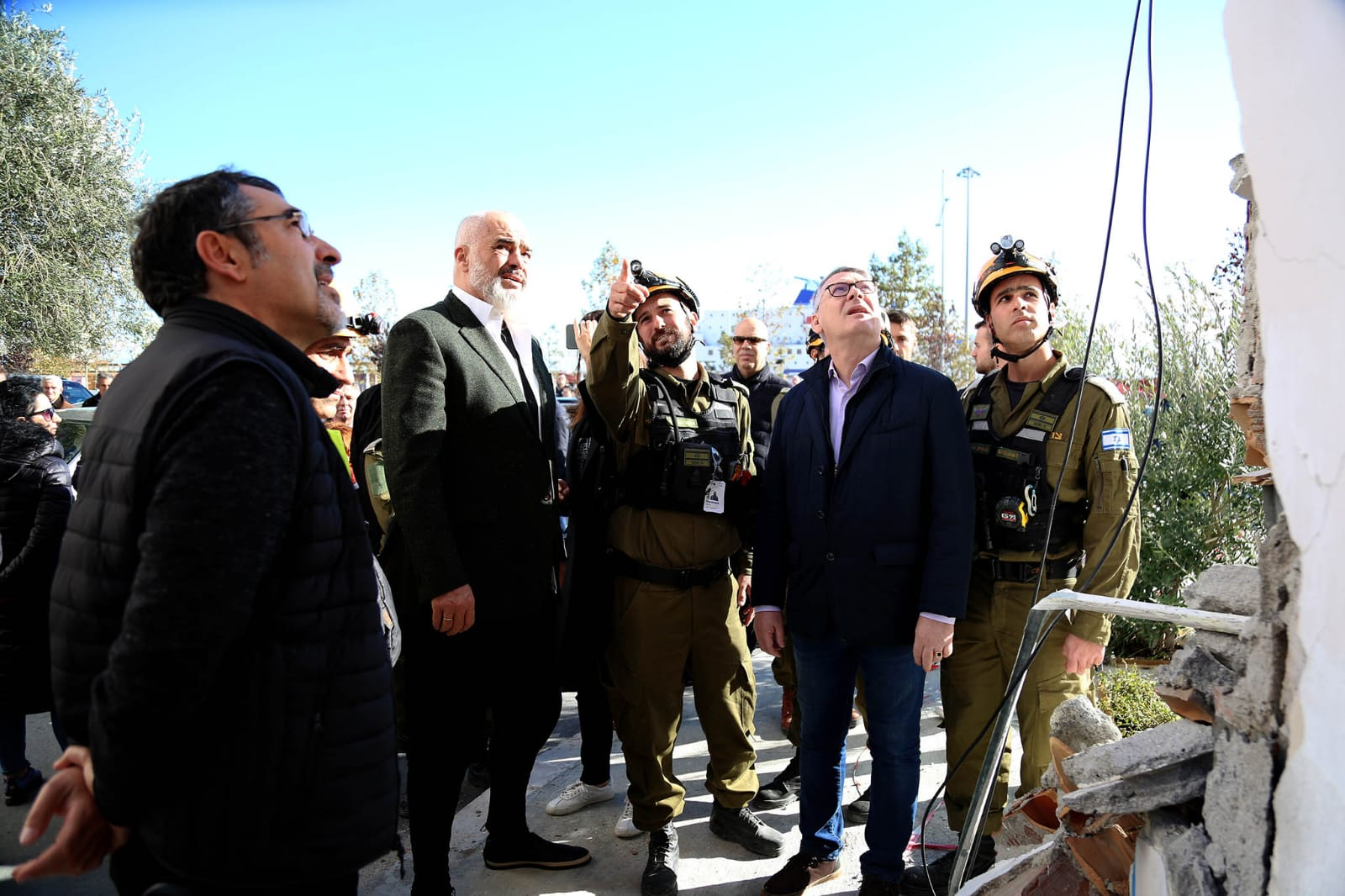
Edi Rama surveying earthquake damage with Israelis military rescue experts.

The aftershocks, some of which were quite large, made it difficult for the search and rescue teams. Albania's Minister of Health Ogerta Manastirliu initially announced over 900 injuries, of which 731 were treated at the hospitals in Tirana and Durrës alone. Reports from the Ministry of Health stated that care was provided for 62 injured people who were in a stable condition, except for 3 people in intensive care. Later, official information from the government confirmed 51 people were killed in the earthquake – 25 in Durrës, 25 in Thumanë, and 1 in Lezhë. Among the deceased were 7 children aged between 2–8. Following the earthquake, an additional 2 people from Kurbin died, one from their injuries in hospital and another through suicide, due to posttraumatic stress. In the aftermath of the event, 5,200 locals were without any shelter. Forty-five people trapped in earthquake debris were rescued.

An Albanian military owned dwelling in Durrës, social centres in Tirana and various privately owned buildings such as 90 gyms in Krujë, Tirana, Lezhë, Durrës and numerous hotels in Vlorë, Durrës and Tirana were adapted and opened to shelter displaced people. Some 2,500 displaced people have been housed in hotels, another 2,100 are in tents, whereas others affected by the earthquake slept in gyms or their cars. In Durrës, authorities distributed food throughout the city and reports of complaints emerged that some people had not yet obtained supplies. Due to safety concerns and aftershocks, some people were not allowed to reenter their own homes and became dependent on food donations until engineers checked buildings. Stemming from concerns caused by the earthquake, there were locals who did not want to return to their homes.

Displaced people have been relocated to Kosovo, with 500 residing in a former German NATO military base in Prizren refitted as a temporary camp by the Kosovo government. Some displaced people are housed in the Kosovan municipalities of Lipjan numbering 3 families, 11 families with 48 members in Podujevë, 70 people in Malishevë, 150 people in Pristina and others in Gjakova. Other people have gone to eastern Albania. Albanian physicians assisted in relief efforts.

Albanian President Ilir Meta, Prime Minister Rama and opposition leader Lulzim Basha visited the earthquake epicentre to see firsthand the situation and damage. The often fraught political rivalry between Meta, Rama and Basha was put aside as all three were involved in relief efforts. National operational centres were established by the Albanian government, along with a phone line for people affected by the earthquake needing clothes or food.

In the immediate aftermath, 2,500 people became displaced by the earthquake and are temporarily being accommodated either in the Niko Dovana Stadium of Durrës in tents or in hotels. Turkey evacuated 23 of its citizens from Albania to a hospital located in Izmir province.

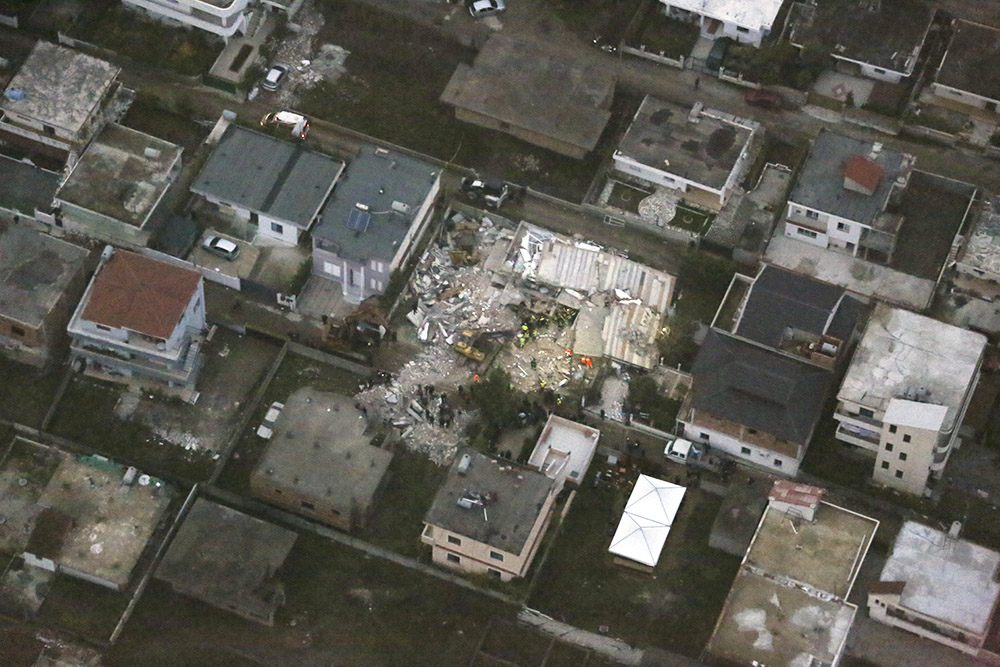
Aerial view of collapsed building in Durrës

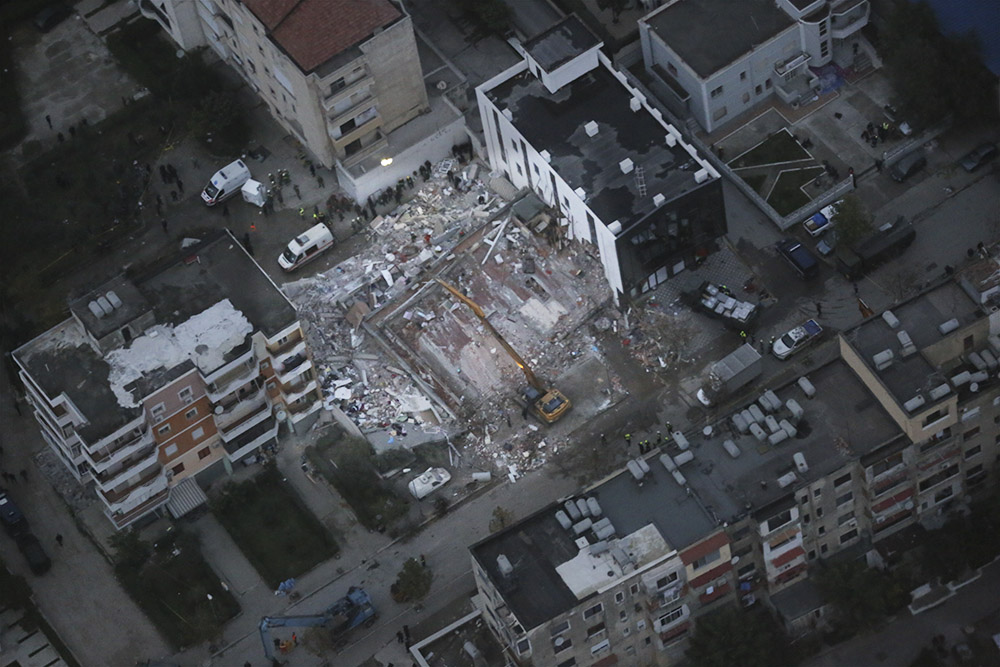
Aerial view of collapsed building in Durrës

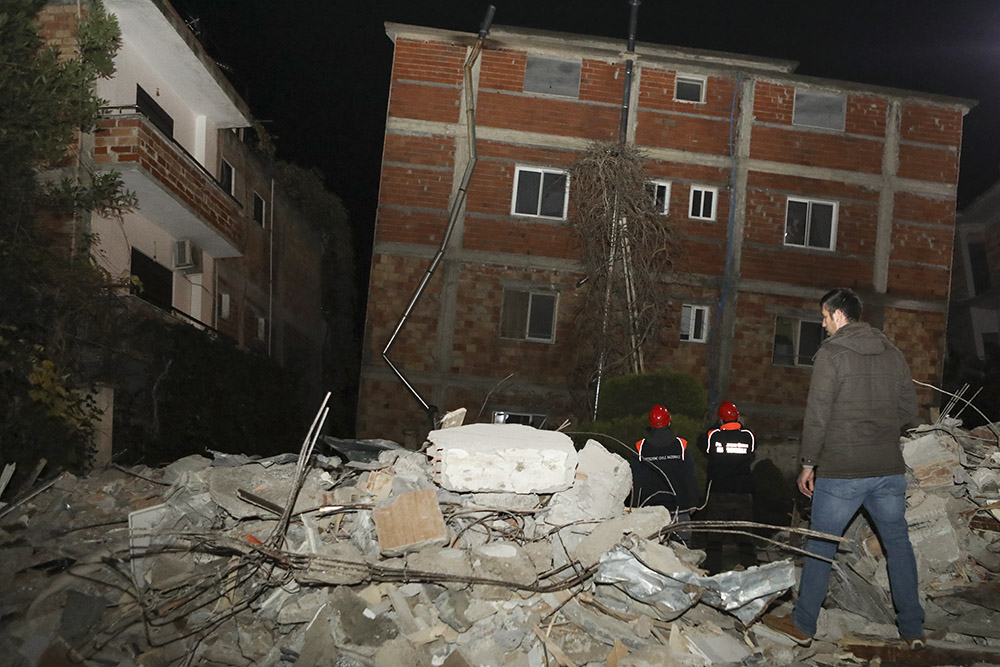
Earthquake damage in Durrës

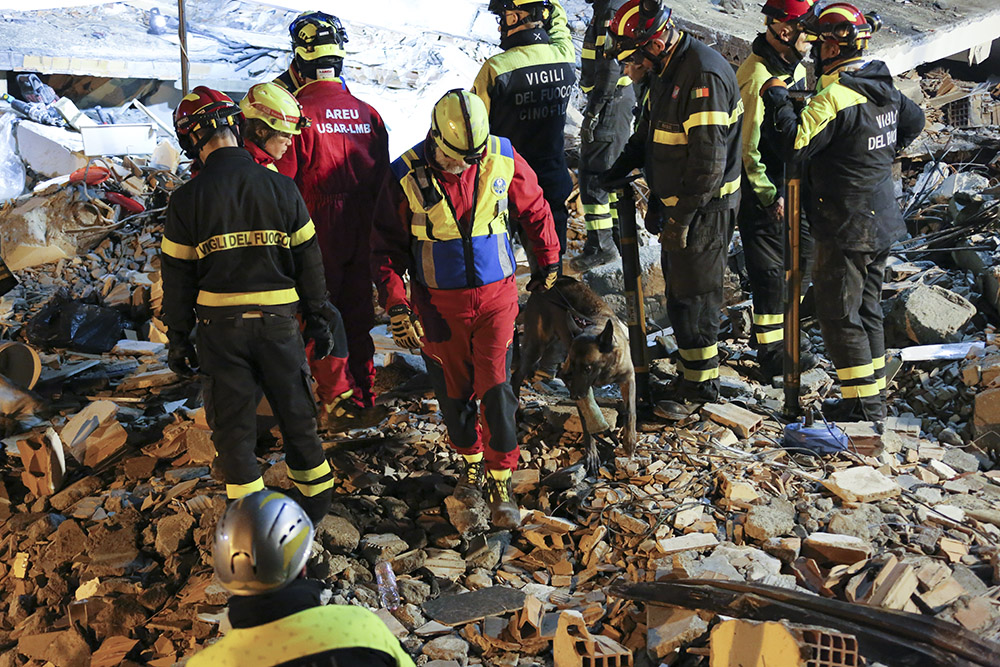
Search and rescue team from Italy working on a collapsed building

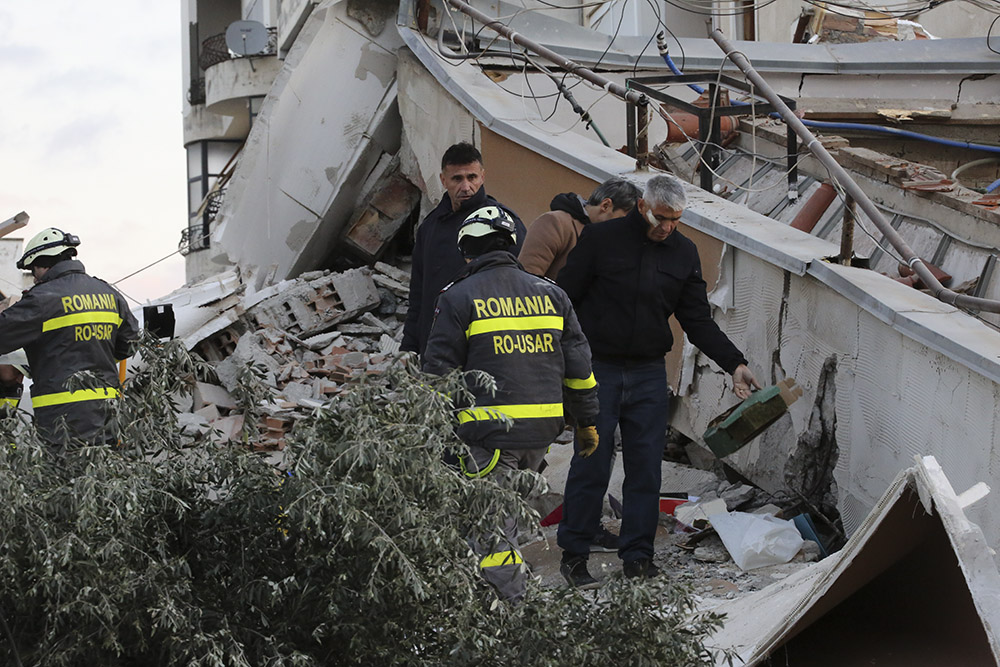
Search and rescue team from Romania working on a collapsed building

On 30 November, Prime Minister Rama announced the end of the search and rescue operation, as no more bodies were expected to be under the rubble. According to his statement, about 2,000 people were injured from the earthquake in total, with more than 4,000 being left homeless in the disaster's aftermath. Preliminary figures indicated that more than 1,465 buildings in the capital Tirana suffered serious damage, in addition to about 900 in nearby Durrës. The first funeral for the deceased was held on Friday, with hundreds of people in attendance, including President Meta and Prime Minister Rama.

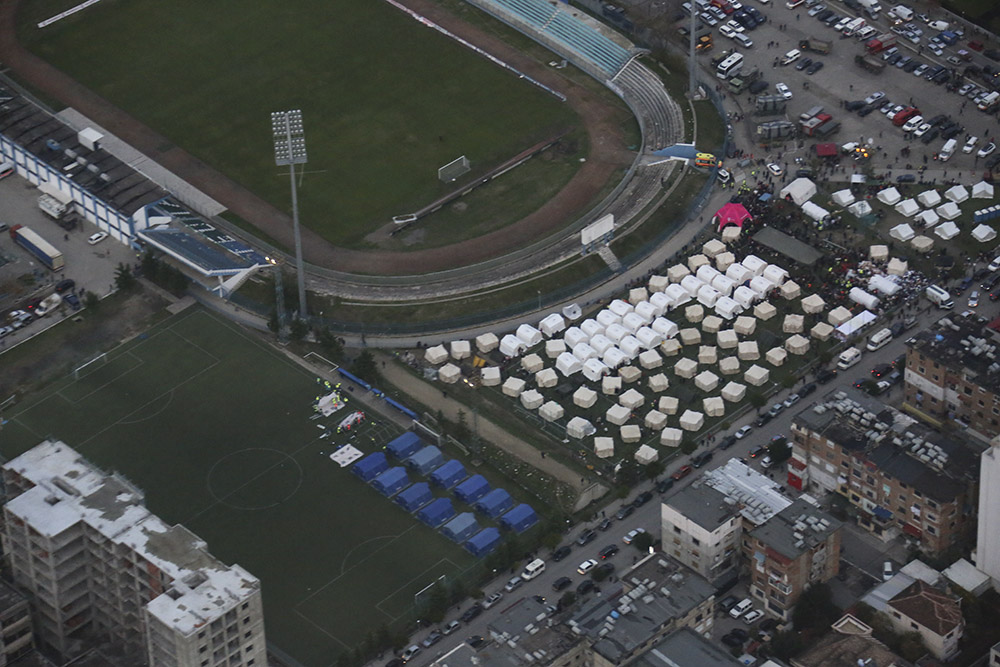
Blue and white coloured emergency tents for displaced people near stadium in Durrës

Earthquake damage is being checked by civil engineers from the European Union, United States and local experts to assess whether buildings are structurally sound, unsafe and required demolition or just needed replastering. Demolition of damaged structures deemed unsafe, some through remote control explosions by the Albanian army, began, with others to follow suit in the future. The Prosecutor's office ordered on 3 December that it needed lists of damaged buildings from police and municipal authorities before permission was granted for demolition, due to pending investigations.

The EU office in Albania estimated that some 1.9 million people out of a total population of 2.8 million have been affected by the earthquake. Of those, more than 3,000 people were injured, 14,000 became homeless and throughout Albania 14,000 buildings were damaged, of which 2,500 are rendered uninhabitable. According to the Albanian government, in mid-December 13,000 people were placed in shelters, of whom 5,000 were placed in hotels. A fortnight after the event, some rural earthquake victims in the impact zone stated that government aid was either inadequate to non-existent and that they were still living in a dire situation. Official data in early January stated that 10,000 people were still sheltering in tents. In late January 2020, 48,000 dwellings and structures have undergone inspection and the government has identified 35 areas in 10 municipalities for future rebuilding work.

In early February 2020, the Albanian government put the damage figure at €985 million (US$1.09 billion). More than 11,000 buildings were destroyed, and 83,000 others were damaged. More than 200,000 people were affected by the earthquake, and the government estimated that about €1.1 billion (US$1.21 billion) is required for post-earthquake reconstruction.

== Aftermath ==
A national day of mourning was declared in Albania and neighbouring Kosovo where two of the victims were from and which has an ethnic Albanian majority population. In North Macedonia, the Albanian majority municipalities of Tetovo, Struga and Čair held days of mourning for the earthquake victims. Albanian Independence Day celebrations, held annually on 28 November, were cancelled in Albania, Kosovo and in majority Albanian municipalities of North Macedonia and Montenegro.

=== Albanian civilian and state response ===
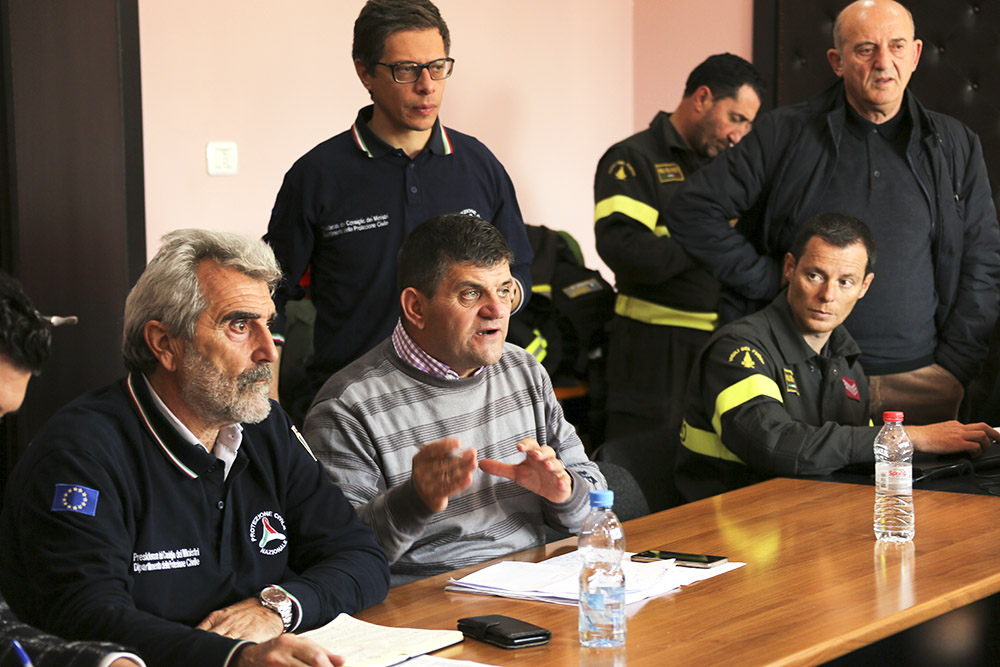
Albanian and EU officials giving a press conference

In Albania, volunteers, along with some small organisations established drop off points for donations of food, clothing, blankets and hygiene products at prominent landmarks throughout Tirana and used social media to mobilise people to provide assistance. Three humanitarian organisations sorted and packed the items and sent them through several truckloads for distribution among displaced people of the earthquake zone. As demand was high, citizens were urged to donate over the coming days. Hundreds of Albanians in Albania and Kosovo opened their homes to people displaced by the earthquake. Some students from Tirana went to assist relief efforts in Durrës and delivered hundreds of meals to earthquake affected people. Residents of Tirana held a candlelight vigil in the city centre in honour of the deceased.

The Albanian state initiated an online fundraising campaign for donations, raising 156 million leks, €1,600,000 and $25,000. The Socialist party in parliament and members of the Albanian government along with 60 mayors donated their November salary to the aid effort. The Muslim Community of Albania organised nationwide fundraising for monetary, food and material supplies and opened its mosques and madrasas as a place of shelter for earthquake victims. The Orthodox Church of Albania under Archbishop Anastasios opened the local monasteries and churches to people displaced by the earthquake. The Catholic Church in Albania held mass in its churches on 27 and 28 November for earthquake victims and coordinated its relief efforts through local branches of the Catholic charity Caritas Albania. Football fan groups such as "Kuq e Zi" of the Albania national football team set up an emergency fund and sent volunteers from throughout the country to assist in relief operations. Fan groups from local teams such as "Tirona Fanatics" KF Tirana, "Guerrils" FK Partizani Tirana, KF Vllaznia Shkodër and players from clubs such as FK Kukësi sent food and clothing supplies and expressed solidarity with victims during matches following the first weekend after the earthquake.

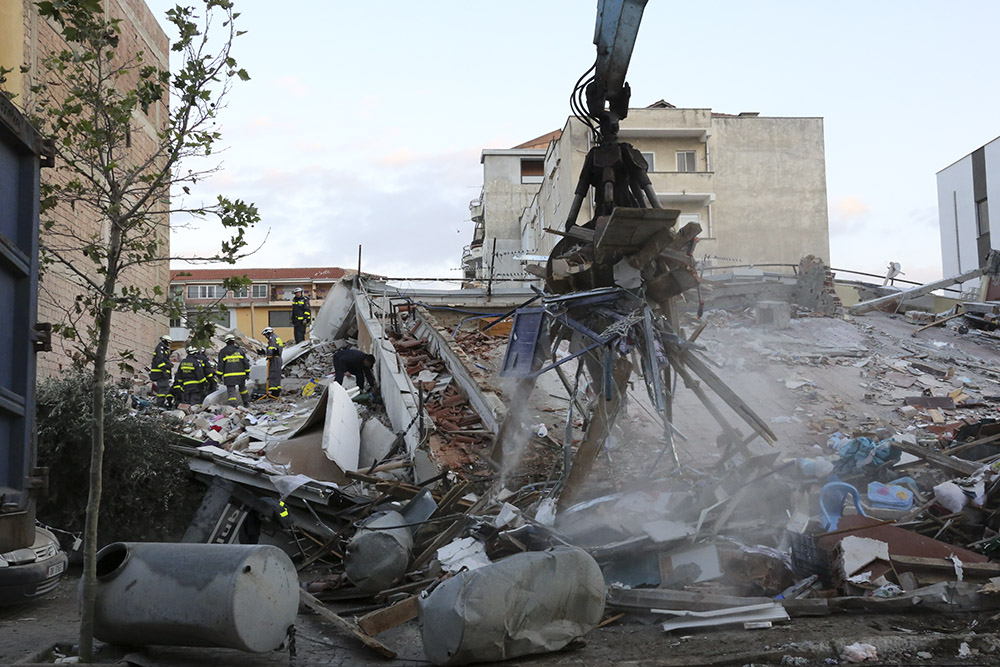
Heavy machinery clearing earthquake debris

The Albanian government established a monetary compensation scheme that would give families of deceased people scholarships to children, pensions for the elderly and 1 million lek ($9,000) for a family. Prime Minister Rama said that the state budget was being reconfigured to manage the situation following the earthquake. Rama stated that the draft budget of 2020 would provide funds for the construction of homes and cost some 7 billion leke ($63.10 million) or 0.4% of Gross Domestic Product (GDP). The exact final amount is unknown and apart from the aim of getting displaced people into homes, Rama wants reconstruction to expand economic growth, jobs and consumption.

Apart from costs and planned projects already factored in, the government committed itself to no new budgetary expenditure except for irrigation, to accumulate funds for reconstruction. Rama has called for additional expert assistance and monetary aid geared toward recovery from the international community, stating that Albania lacks the capacity "to do this [reconstruction] alone." By mid-December, 13 billion leks ($171 million) were allocated for future reconstruction by the Albanian government. In late January 2020, the government budget placed a total of 20 billion Lek in a fund for the future rebuilding process.

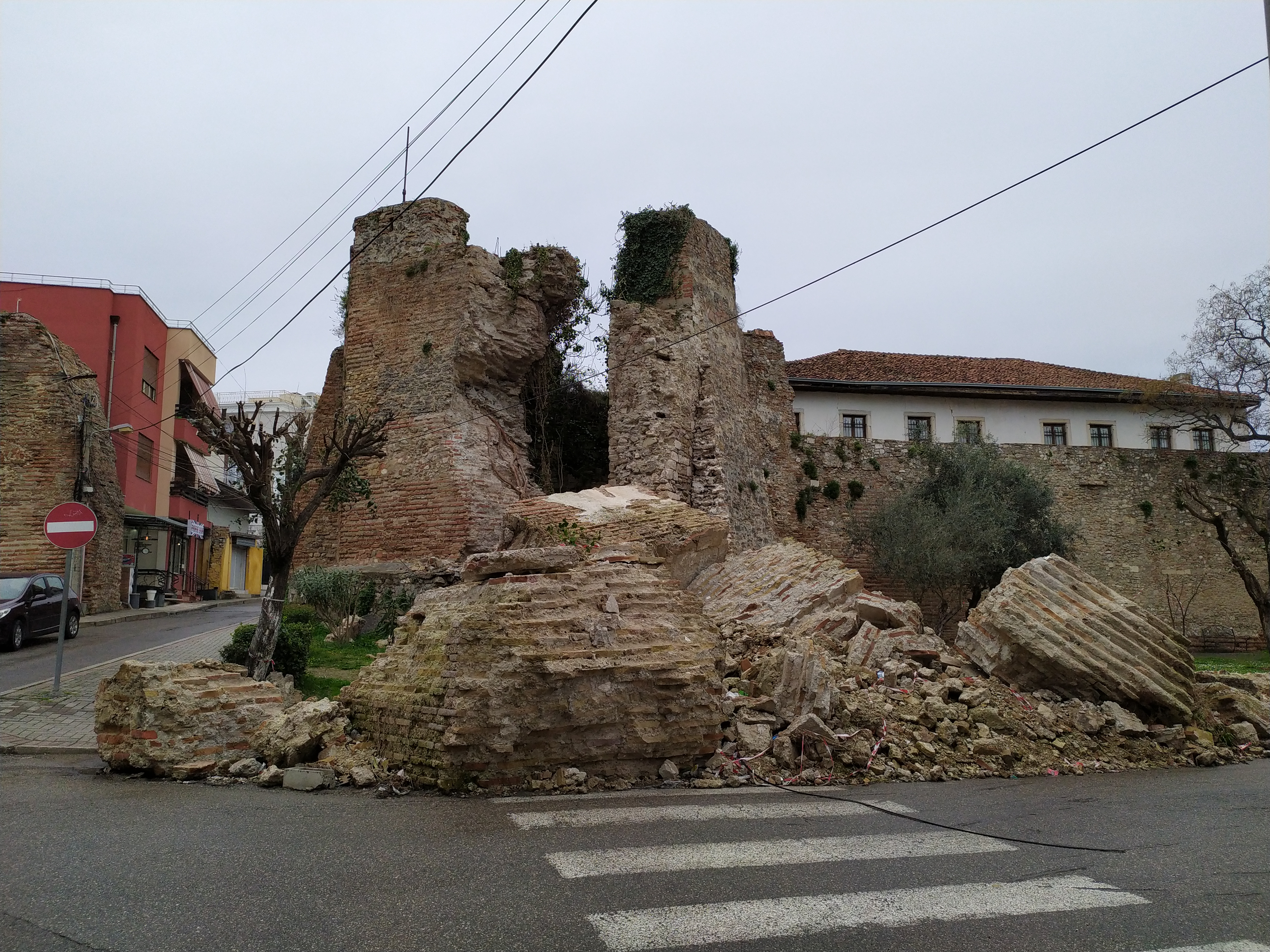
Durrës castle walls damaged by the earthquake

In Albania, a large proportion of the earthquake damage has been blamed on corruption, violations of the building code and substandard construction following the demise of communism during the early 1990s. The Albanian state has drafted a law in the aftermath of the earthquake that would see investors, supervisors and architects go to prison for a period of 7–15 years if proper construction practices are violated. Albanian prosecutors have begun proceedings to investigate violations of regulations and illegal building within the construction industry. On 14 December, Albanian prosecutors and police detained nine people on charges of murder and abuse of power, including two owners of collapsed hotels. A further eight individuals are being sought who are also suspected of failing to follow safety regulations. In mid-December, Prime Minister Rama was criticised by NGOs, human rights organisations and parts of the media of misusing the situation to pass controversial legislation after he sought a three-month extension for his state of emergency powers from parliament. A new government portfolio was established and on 20 December, Arben Ahmetaj became the Minister of State for Reconstruction to oversee the rebuilding process.

=== Kosovo Albanian civilian assistance ===
In Kosovo, its ethnic Albanian population reacted to the earthquake in Albania with sentiments of solidarity, moved in part by memories of solidarity and sanctuary the Albanians of Albania provided them when they fled ethnic cleansing by Serb forces during the 1999 Kosovo war. Kosovo Albanians undertook fundraising initiatives and appeals, collected money, food, clothing and shelter donations. In Pristina, volunteers established a drop-off point in the central square for donations of supplies, and several truckloads were sent to displaced people affected by the earthquake. Volunteers and humanitarian aid in trucks, buses and hundreds of cars from Kosovo traveled to Albania to assist in the situation and people were involved in tasks such as the operation of mobile kitchens and gathering financial aid. Kosovo Albanian school children donated clothes, food, and books. By 29 November, more than 100 tons of supplies donated by Kosovo businesses and civilians reached Albania. Candlelight vigils were held in parts of Kosovo in honour of the deceased. Various football fan groups and their clubs such as"Intelektualët" FC Drita, "Skifterat" SC Gjilani, "Plisat" FC Prishtina, "Stuhia e Kuqe" KF Arbëria, "Tigrat" KF Ulpiana, "Legjendat" FC Llapi, "Gladiatorët" KF Vushtrria and from KF KEK were involved in collecting donations, mobilising and sending busloads of volunteers to assist in relief efforts.

The Islamic Community of Kosovo organised a fundraising effort on 29 November after Friday prayers across all its mosques within the country and sent several convoys of aid to earthquake victims. The Catholic Church in Kosovo sent members from the Catholic charity Caritas Kosova to assist in Albania. In Kosovo, the Catholic Church held mass on 1 December across the country, and it collected charitable donations by parishioners for earthquake victims and their families. President Hashim Thaçi was part of a presidential delegation that visited the earthquake epicentre and expressed his condolences on behalf of Kosovo. On 29 November, outgoing Kosovo Prime Minister Ramush Haradinaj and his successor Albin Kurti visited Durrës to survey the damage and expressed Kosovan commitment to relief efforts and the need for institutional cooperation between both countries. In Serbia, ethnic Albanians of the Preševo valley donated aid and sent it through several convoys to earthquake victims.

=== Albanian civilian assistance from Montenegro and North Macedonia ===
Albanians from North Macedonia responded in large numbers to the Albanian government's appeal for financial assistance through donations to various humanitarian organisations and special bank accounts fundraising for aid. The Islamic Religious Community of Macedonia organised a fundraising effort on 29 November after Friday prayers across all its mosques within North Macedonia. Parliamentary speaker Talat Xhaferi, Deputy Prime Minister Bujar Osmani and leader of DUI Ali Ahmeti were part of a delegation of Albanian politicians from North Macedonia visiting the earthquake epicentre that expressed their condolences to President Meta. The mayor of Čair, Visar Ganiu visited the earthquake epicentre and brought fans known as "Shvercerat" from the football club FK Shkupi to volunteer assistance. Other football fan groups "Ballistët" KF Shkëndija and "Ilirët" KF Bashkimi collected donations and sent busloads of volunteers to assist in relief efforts.

In Montenegro, ethnic Albanians from Ulcinj were involved in a major relief effort sending items such as food, blankets, diapers and baby milk through a local humanitarian organisation Amaneti and in Tuzi through fundraising efforts. A blood donation effort for earthquake victims was organised by the Bosniak Youth Forum of Montenegro, with hundreds of Albanians from Ulcinj partaking in the initiative. In Ulcinj, the Islamic Community of Montenegro collected aid for earthquake victims in all mosques of the city and surrounding area.

=== Local business and International civilian assistance ===
Various prominent businesses owned by ethnic Albanians and charities in Albania and Kosovo, along with notable members of the Albanian community in the Balkans, including businessmen, politicians, journalists, actors and socialites, made large financial contributions to humanitarian aid. Businesses that made large donations include the International Albanian Airport (€1,000,000) and Balfin Group (€1,200,000), the charities Fundjavë Ndryshe ($1,400,000) and Shqiptarët për Shqiptarët ($590,000), along with individuals such as Kosovo politician Behgjet Pacolli (€1,000,000) and Albanian businessman Shefqet Kastrati (€1,500,000).

Globally, the Albanian diaspora expressed its solidarity and held multiple fundraisers to send money to Albania and assist people impacted by the earthquake. In the United States, an Albanian-American organisation named Albanian Roots raised $1,300,000 for earthquake victims. Global celebrities of Albanian descent such as Bebe Rexha, Rita Ora, and Dua Lipa pledged support, sent donations, and made visits to the country's most quake-ravaged regions in hopes to rebuild some of the affected areas' infrastructure. In all, these non-state donations by Albanians from the Balkans and global diaspora totaled some 13 million dollars of humanitarian assistance to Albania.

Individual donations by people from 76 countries were also made through online fundraising on the websites GoFundMe and Facebook totaling $3,600,000. Money from the Albanian diaspora continued to arrive in Albania and Prime Minister Rama tasked a group of fundraisers, that included a Muslim imam experienced in housing the needy, to combine the donations and maintain oversight of their usage. By early December, all donations for humanitarian assistance totaled $92 million.

=== International donors conferences and reconstruction efforts ===
The European Union; the Pope; the Ecumenical Patriarch; the Organisation of Islamic Cooperation Secretary General; presidents of Azerbaijan; China; Armenia; Serbia; Montenegro; United States; Greece; the German Chancellor; the monarchs of Qatar, Jordan and Saudi Arabia; the Bulgarian Prime Minister; the Iranian and Estonian foreign ministers expressed their condolences to the people of Albania.

Turkish President Recep Tayyip Erdoğan expressed his condolences, called for aid from other Muslim countries and stated he will lobby them to provide assistance to Albania for future reconstruction. Prime Minister Rama contacted President Erdoğan and asked for the creation of an international donors' conference, with one involving western countries and the other with states from the east. Rama also wrote to US President Donald Trump and other countries such as Sweden, Malaysia, Japan, Great Britain, Germany and Australia asking for assistance. President Erdoğan, citing close Albanian-Turkish relations, committed Turkey to reconstructing 500 earthquake destroyed homes in Albania. The Turkish reconstruction effort will focus on Laç and Kodër-Thumanë where the homes will be built, along with civic structures such as gardens, parks, shopping centers, parking lots and religious buildings. The Turkish government will administer reconstruction in Laç and cooperate with the Albanian government on building designs and getting earthquake affected people quickly into homes. Qatar committed itself to the future reconstruction effort.

At the NATO 2019 London summit (3–4 December), constructive discussions were held by Prime Minister Rama with French President Emmanuel Macron, President Trump, Canadian Prime Minister Justin Trudeau, British Prime Minister Boris Johnson and other European leaders over establishing an international conference for financial aid. German chancellor Angela Merkel has stated that Germany would provide future assistance. In Istanbul, Turkey held a donor's conference (8 December) for Albania that was organised and attended by President Erdoğan and included Turkish businessmen, investors and Prime Minister Rama.

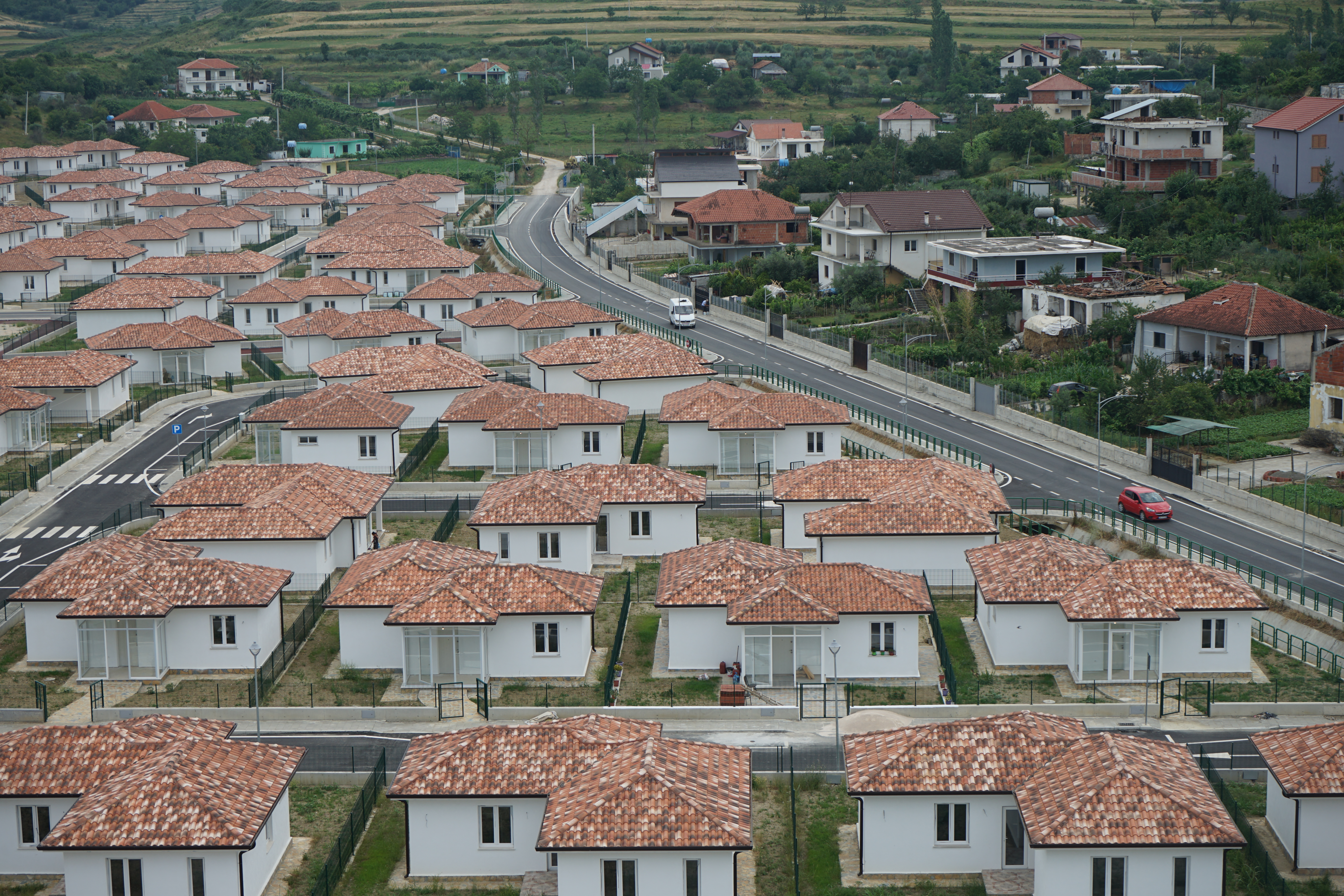
Reconstructed buildings in Thumanë in 2022.

On 12 December, Italian Foreign Minister Luigi Di Maio made calls for the establishment of an international conference for financial aid to Albania. Following the completion of the earthquake damage report by Albanian authorities, the European Council announced on 13 December that the European Union will organise an international donors' conference for January 2020 in Tirana. A Post-Disaster Needs Assessment (PDNA) was established by the United Nations (UN), World Bank and EU to assess the situation and to provide information for the donors' conference regarding efforts toward rehabilitation and reconstruction. On 10 January, the EU announced that it had organised a donors' conference for Albania to take place on 17 February. Apart from the EU and its member countries, delegates from other states, international organisations and financial institutions such as the UN and World Bank are expected to partake in the conference.

== International assistance ==
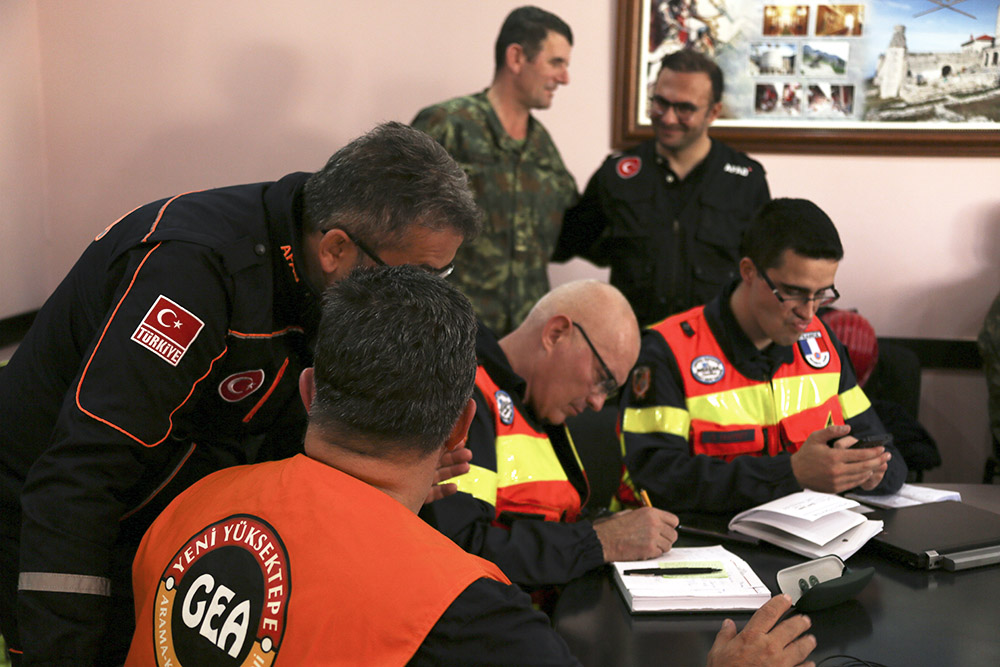
Turkish and French search and rescue teams coordinating efforts

A number of countries and businesses have offered assistance for relief:

- Austria — €600,000 were allocated by the Austrian government for humanitarian aid and future reconstruction to Albania.
- Azerbaijan — €500,000 was allocated by the Azerbaijani government for humanitarian aid to Albania.
- Bosnia and Herzegovina — Some €30,000 (BAM60,000) was collected by one association and 120 tonnes of goods in aid was sent to people in Albania. The Council of Ministers of Bosnia and Herzegovina allocated about €50,000 (BAM100,000) to assist Albania.
- Bulgaria — €100,000 was allocated by the Bulgarian government for humanitarian aid to Albania. An additional €50,000 worth of aid in the form of 1,000 tents, 1,000 blankets plus pillows and other materials were sent as well.
- China — Chinese authorities stated that they will provide future financial assistance. Two Chinese companies raised €2 million for the relief effort. In early December, the Chinese embassy in Albania donated humanitarian supplies and distributed them through the Red Cross to people affected by the earthquake.
- Croatia — A search and rescue team, composed of 15 members of the Directorate for Civil Protection of Ministry of Interior and search and rescue dogs, plus two military helicopters was sent to Albania.
- Czech Republic — Czech Republic offered assistance to Albania shortly after 09:00 AM, depicting the deployment of one medium USAR team, which is composed of the Czech Fire Rescue Service. The central USAR team from the controller consists of 36 persons (cynologists, doctors, technicians, detachment commander, platoon commander, firemen, rescue teams and statics). The Czech Parliament showed solidarity by holding a one-minute silence honoring the victims of the earthquake in Albania.
- Egypt — In late December, Egypt through its organisation the Egyptian Agency of Partnership for Development (EAPD) delivered medical aid to Albania for people affected by the earthquake.
- Estonia — €50,000 was allocated by the Estonian government for future reconstruction in Albania.

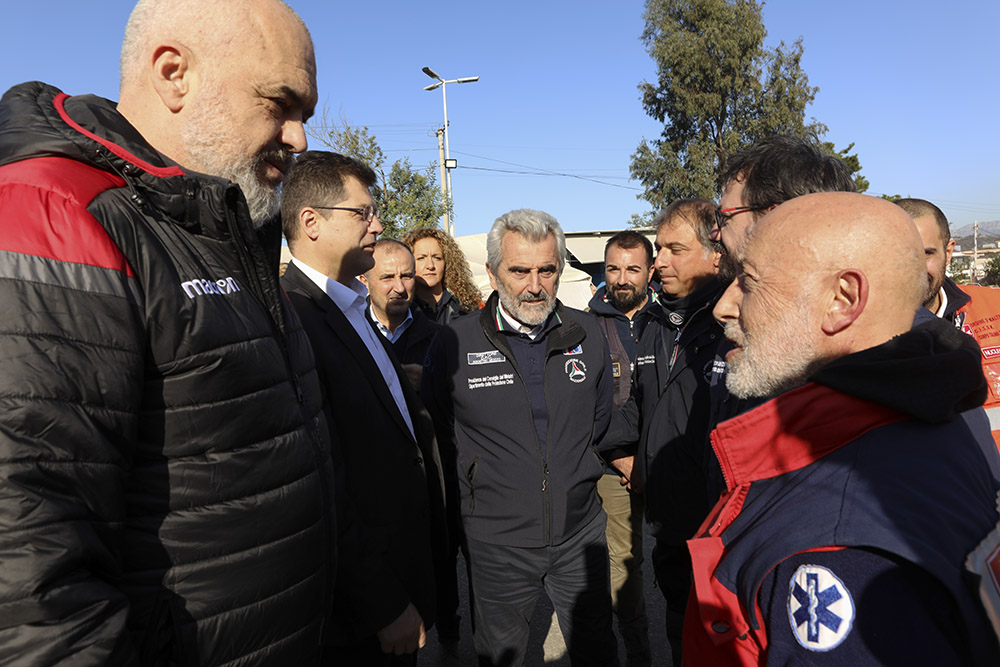
Prime Minister Edi Rama converses with EU officials and members of crisis management team

- European Union — Have donated to Albania €1.15 billion and activated the Civil Protection Mechanism on the day of the earthquake. As such, the EU became involved in the international assistance effort that followed in relation to mobilisation of three teams from Romania, Greece and Italy, aid and structural engineers to evaluate earthquake damage. The EU promised to provide further future assistance to the state and people affected by the earthquake. The EU worked with the United Nations to coordinate earthquake relief assistance. The EU allocated €15 million for earthquake relief in Albania, and it will send 200 individuals to assist with the rebuilding process.
- Finland — Finland sent experts and material assistance to Albania for post-earthquake recovery. Material assistance from Finland contains 48 family tents, 360 blankets and 1,000 sleeping pads.
- France — Three teams representing a total of 100 rescuers belonging to the Sécurité Civile, the Bataillon des Marins-Pompiers de Marseille, and the firefighters of the south of France were deployed. They were backed by two Sécurité Civile's planes: a Beechcraft Super King Air 200 for light transport duties and a cargo Bombardier Dash 8.
- Germany — €4 million was allocated by the German government for the reconstruction effort in Albania.
- Greece — Two earthquake expert ΕΜΑΚ (Special Units for Disaster Management) units consisting of 40 members and search and rescue dogs were deployed, along with trucks, and one C-130 airplane with food parcels. In addition, doctors and medicine were sent to help and support the civilians. Moreover, three military mobile kitchens together with their personnel were sent. Greece also sent a team of civil engineers to assess the damage, and a team of surgeons to operate on the injured. The Greek teams pulled two people alive from the ruins. Greek Red Cross teams assisted with humanitarian needs and issues related to the quake, such as 800 blankets, 800 mattresses, rugs and hundreds of backpacks with various personal items. Furthermore, there were independent initiatives by schools, educational institutes, local governments such as the Municipality of Patras and regional governments such as the Periphery of Central Macedonia, for additional gathering of emergency aid for Albania. Additional aid was gathered by local associations, such as the "Albanians of Zakynthos Association", in response of the local populations to Leonard Petritaj's pleas. Fans of the Greek football team Iraklis announced that members of their association travelled to Albania with emergency supplies for the earthquake victims. On 3 December 2019, a large-scale initiative named "All Together We Can" was completed successfully, in cooperation with the Periphery of Attica, the Greek Red Cross, and the Albanian Embassy in Athens. The response of the Greek people was "huge" and resulted in the gathering of 250 tons of emergency supplies for the affected in Albania. Prime Minister Rama thanked "the Greek people", expressed admiration for the Greek rescuers, and stated that he hoped "we can be like you one day".
- Hungary — In the immediate aftermath of the earthquake, Hungary sent €33,000 worth of aid consisting of self-heating food packages, blankets, camp beds, sleeping beds and tents. Hungary sent a second consignment of similar supplies worth €62,520 to Albania. In early December, a group of seven Hungarian engineers and structural specialists were sent to survey earthquake damaged structures in Albania.

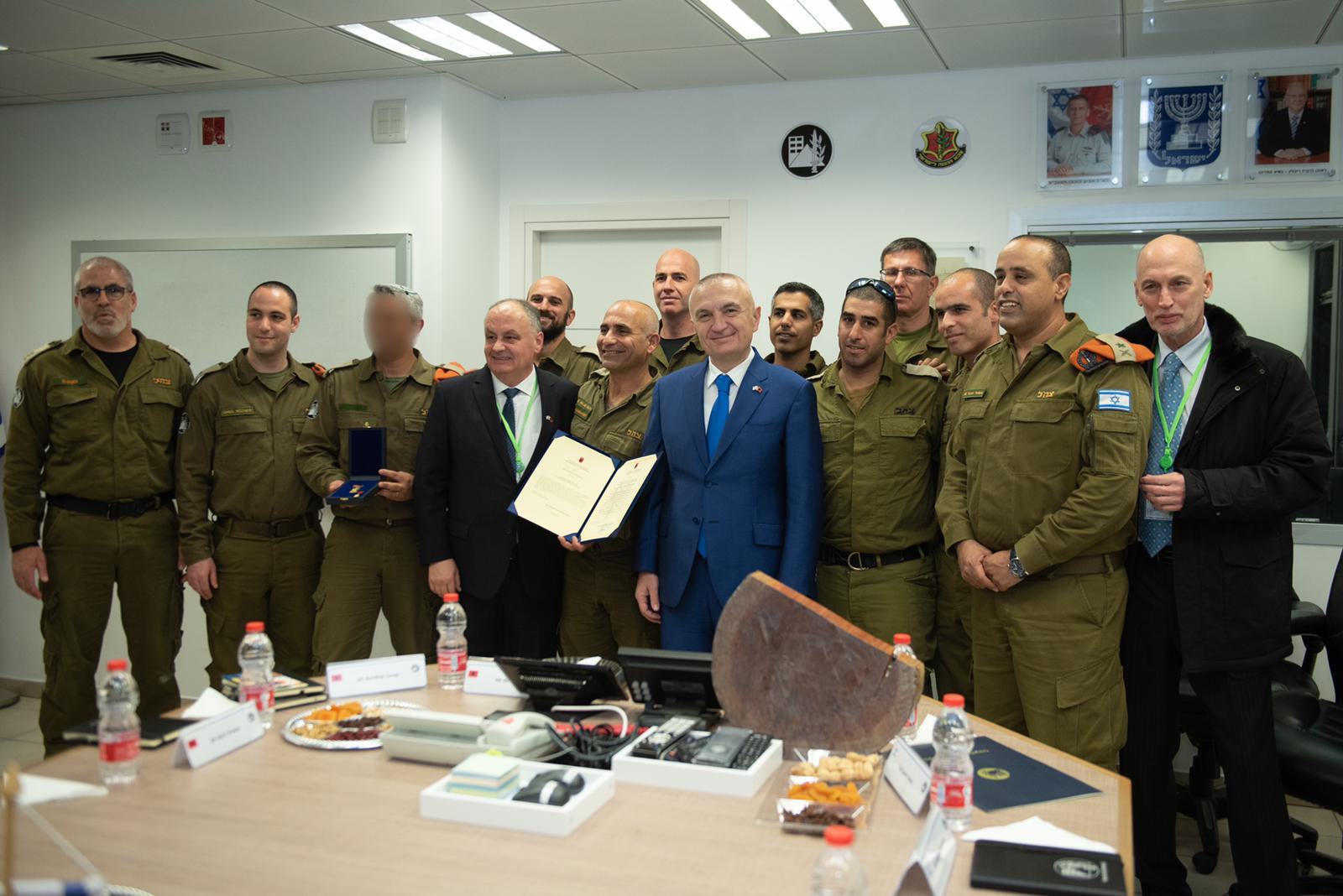
President Ilir Meta awarding the IDF National Rescue Unit the Albanian Golden Medal of the Eagle in Israel.

- Israel — Israel sent a search and rescue team from the regional council of Mevo'ot HaHermon to Albania, as well as Israel Defense Forces (IDF) Home Front Command military engineer troops to search through the rubble for survivors and rescue them, assess whether buildings were structurally sound, and provide Albanians who had been evacuated from their homes with waterproof tents to shelter them. At Ramla military base in Israel, he awarded the Albanian Golden Medal of the Eagle to the National Rescue Unit of the IDF.
- Italy — Italy sent an urban search and rescue team from the National Firefighters Corps composed of more than 20 field specialists in search operations, medical assistance, and engineers. Soon afterwards, 200 trained volunteers from the Civil Protection (Protezione Civile) were dispatched. The Catholic Church in Italy donated €500,000 for relief efforts. Football teams expressed messages of support and in several weekend matches following the earthquake, Italian football fans waved banners with messages of solidarity.
- Kosovo — Outgoing Prime Minister Haradinaj allocated €500,000 on behalf of the Kosovo government to Albania for humanitarian aid and over €3,5 million were sent by the Kosovar population. 110 specialised operators of the Kosovo Police were dispatched, as were 40 members of the Kosovo Security Force's (KSF) Urban Search and Rescue Units. The Kosovo Finance Ministry allocated €10,000 to the families of two earthquake victims from Gjilan, Kosovo. The municipality of Pristina sent €50,000 in humanitarian aid and engineers to assess damaged buildings. The municipalities of Gjakova sent €14,000 while Kaçanik (€10,000), Malishevë (€5,000), Klina (€5,000), Dragash (€5,000), Mitrovica (€20,000) and Obiliq sent €15,000 plus supplies of packaged food. Skënderaj municipality sent €20,000 and an additional €40,000 was raised from local donations, of which €5,000 was allocated to the families of 2 earthquake victims from Kosovo. Gllogoc municipality sent €10,000 and an additional €12,000 was raised from local businesses. Deçan municipality fundraised €20,000 from its citizens for relief efforts and sent 6 trucks with clothing and food to Albania. The Trepça and Artana Mines sent rescuers, and the Kosovo Energy Corporation (KEK) sent a fire brigade unit. The Kosovo Liberation Army War Veterans' Organisation sent €5,000 for humanitarian aid. At an awards ceremony on 4 December in Kosovo, President Meta on behalf of Albania expressed its gratitude and thanked Kosovo for its civilian, business, state and political contributions "to support their Albanian brothers and sisters". Meta awarded all members of the KSF, the Golden Medal of the Eagle and made the Kosovo Police Special Operations Unit part of the National Flag Order to honour their assistance to the relief effort. Meta also awarded the Particular Civil Merits Medal to the KSF K9 unit, the Artana and Trepça Mine rescue units, the team from the Kosovo Energy Corporation and to a team from the Kosovo Fire Brigade. Haradinaj in turn awarded Meta the Gjergj Kastrioti Skanderbeg Medal and stated that "when we are united, no earthquake can weaken us".
- Latvia — €70,000 was allocated by the Latvian government for humanitarian aid to Albania.
- Lithuania — €60,000 were allocated by the Lithuanian government for humanitarian aid to Albania.
- Luxembourg — €100,000 were allocated by the Ministry of Foreign and European Affairs for humanitarian aid to Albania.
- Montenegro — Montenegro sent 18 rescue service specialists. Podgorica and Bar municipalities each donated 20,000 euros for humanitarian aid. Albanian majority municipalities of Montenegro such as Ulcinj sent €10,000 and firefighting teams and newly formed Tuzi sent €3,000.
- Nigeria — A donation of €100,000 for earthquake relief efforts was made by Nigerian-based businessmen Nitin Sandesara and Chetan Sandesara through their company Sterling Oil.
- North Macedonia — North Macedonia sent €100,000 in financial aid as well as drones with thermal cameras to search for survivors under the rubble. Rescue teams were also sent as well as mechanical equipment to clear the rubble. Albanian majority municipalities of North Macedonia such as Tetovo sent humanitarian aid plus 500,000 denars while Struga (1 million denars), Debar (300,000 denars), Kičevo (€12,000), Želino (€5,000) plus did additional fundraising, Čair sent firefighters and Gostivar sent humanitarian aid plus teams of firefighters and doctors. Majority Macedonian municipalities with Albanian minorities such as Jegunovce sent €1,500 and Gazi Baba sent €5,000 for relief efforts.
- Poland — At the request of the Albanian government, Poland in late December sent 4 firefighter teams to the country and 500 field beds in earthquake aid.
- Qatar — Qatar through the Qatar Fund for Development (QFFD) and Qatar Charity sent supplies consisting of food, blankets, beds and clothing.
- Romania — Romania sent one Alenia C-27 J Spartan airplane and one Lockheed C-130 Hercules airplane, one military helicopter, trucks, as well as a RO-USAR team with a total of 52 IGSU firefighters, and SMURD doctors and nurses, plus 12 tons of its own search and rescue materials, including four search and rescue dogs accompanied by two specialised volunteers. The Romanian Orthodox Church launched a fundraiser campaign on 26 November.
- Serbia — The Special Search and Rescue Team, as well as first aid, was sent to Albania. Serbia gave €2 million to Albania.
- South Korea — US$300,000 were allocated by the South Korean government for humanitarian aid and future reconstruction to Albania.
- Sweden — €5.6 million were allocated by the Swedish government for humanitarian aid and future reconstruction to Albania.
- Switzerland — 15 specialists of the Swiss Humanitarian Aid Unit (SHA) were sent to support Albanian emergency forces. The Swiss sent 130 beds and 30 tents for people of the Durrës area and 280 beds and 70 tents for the Kurbin region. Switzerland also sent engineers to assess the structural integrity of earthquake affected buildings.
- Turkey — The day after the earthquake, Turkey through its authority for Disaster and Emergency Management (AFAD) sent one Airbus Atlas airplane with 28 search plus rescue personnel, three vehicles, dozens of hygiene kits plus tents, and a total of 500 blankets plus 500 food packs (flour, sugar, pasta, oil, rice, beans, etc.) to the victims of the earthquake. Turkey sent a convoy of trucks with additional humanitarian aid consisting of 100 hygiene kits, 120 tents and 2,750 blankets. Fifteen AFAD search and rescue personnel operated in Durrës looking for survivors trapped in rubble. Other Turkish rescue teams such as the National Medical Rescue Team (UMKE) from the Turkish Ministry of Health provided medical assistance to quake survivors. Turkey used local branches of its aid agency Turkish Cooperation and Coordination Agency (TIKA) in Albania and Kosovo to coordinate distribution and deliver aid. The AFAD and Turkish Red Crescent (TRC) teams erected tents and assisted with other needs and issues related to the quake. The TRC was involved in providing assistance to the earthquake hit town of Vorë and the village of Bubq. TIKA distributed an additional 1,500 food packages plus 1,500 blankets in Durrës, Thumanë, Kavajë and Fushë Krujë to those affected by the earthquake. On 3 December, a supply of tents were delivered by a Turkish airplane for villagers that preferred to remain near their animals and land during the winter. In Kosovo, Turkey's Kosovo Force (KFOR) contingent provided relief efforts of food, clothing and other assistance to 500 displaced people housed in a camp at Prizren. Prime Minister Rama expressed his "gratitude to Turkey and President Erdoğan" and further stated that the "Albanian people will never forget Turkey's help".
- United Arab Emirates — The UAE in its initial assistance sent shelter, food and medical supplies for 555,000 people. The Emirates Red Crescent distributed additional relief assistance from the UAE worth Dh13 million to people impacted by the earthquake.
- United States — United States Army personnel from the Civil-Military Support Element, Kosovo, arrived in Albania to support relief efforts. The US sent engineers to assess damaged buildings. USAID provided the Albanian Red Cross with a grant for immediate relief efforts and supplies such as hygiene kits and blankets to displaced people. Due to depleting stocks, the United States European Command (EUCOM) sent additional disaster equipment and other material to Albania. Children affected by the earthquake also received psychosocial support services from UNICEF, whose funding comes from USAID. Prime Minister Rama regarded the contribution of aid by the US as "positive". The Soros Open Society Foundations through its branch in Albania donated €500,000 for relief efforts.
- Vatican City — Pope Francis decided to send a first contribution of €100,000 via the Dicastery for Promoting Integral Human Development to support immediate relief efforts.

== See also ==
- List of earthquakes in 2019
- List of earthquakes in Albania
