= Shaqiri =

Shaqiri is an Albanian surname. Notable people with the surname include:

- Ardit Shaqiri (born 1985), Albanian footballer from North Macedonia
- Artim Shaqiri (born 1973), footballer from North Macedonia
- Ilir Shaqiri (born 1973), Albanian-born naturalized Italian dancer and choreographer
- Ilir Shaqiri (singer) (born 1960), Kosovo Albanian singer, songwriter and author
- Xherdan Shaqiri (born 1991), Swiss footballer
- Xhevdet Shaqiri (1923–1997), Albanian footballer
- Xhezair Shaqiri (born 1965), Macedonian politician
