= Haliti =

Haliti is a surname. Notable people with the surname include:

- Ahmet Haliti (born 1988), Albanian footballer
- Bajram Haliti (1955–2022), Kosovar writer and journalist
- Eusebio Haliti (born 1991), Italian sprinter and hurdler
- Labinot Haliti (born 1985), Australian soccer player
- Xhavit Haliti (born 1956), Kosovar Albanian politician
