= Adem Grabovci =

Kosovar activist, military commander, and politician

- Born: 9 April 1960 (age 65); Staradran, Istog, SFR Yugoslavia now Kosovo
- Occupations: politician, lawyer, lector
- Known for: Deputy of the Assembly of Republic of Kosovo, at present Head of Parliamentary Group of PDK
- Children: 2

Adem Grabovci (born 9 April 1960) is a Kosovan politician and a secretary of the Democratic Party of Kosovo.

== Early activity ==
Adem Grabovci was born in the village of Staradran, Istog. He was a political prisoner from 1984 to 1989 and pioneered the reconciliation of blood feuds in 1990. After fleeing to Switzerland, he served as chairman of the People's Movement of Kosovo branch in Switzerland and was a member of the Popular Movement for the diaspora. He was one of the founders of the fund "Homeland Calling" (Albanian: Vendlindja therret) which collected financial contribution from Albanian diaspora during the war. He was one of the founders of the KLA, and a member of the General Staff of the KLA.

== Political career ==
In the elections of 17 November 2007, Grabovci was elected member of the Parliament of the Republic of Kosovo. He is currently a member, and also member of the Commission for the Supervision of Public Finances. Grabovci serves as chairman of the parliamentary group of the Democratic Party of Kosovo where he was a co-founder in 1999, and also chairman of the Democratic Party of Kosovo in Peja since 2005. He previously served as Secretary of Finance of PDK, Deputy Minister of Transport and Telecommunications from 2007 under Fatmir Limaj, and Minister of Finances in the Hashim Thaci's provisional government.

== Personal life ==
Grabovci is married and has 2 children living in Pristina. He teaches law at the University of Pristina, Faculty of Law. In addition to Albanian he also speaks German, Serbian, and Slovenian.
