= Xhavit Haliti =

Kosovo-Albanian politician, philosopher, and linguist

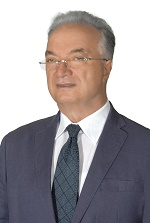
- Born: 8 March 1956 (age 70); Novo Selo, Peć, FPR Yugoslavia
- Occupations: Politician, Deputy Chairman of the Assembly of Kosovo
- Political party: Democratic Party of Kosovo - PDK

Xhavit Haliti (born 8 March 1956 in Novo Selo, Peć) is a Kosovo-Albanian politician, philosopher, linguist and one of the founders of the Kosovo Liberation Army.

== Early life and education ==
Haliti was born near the city of Peja, where he finished elementary school and high school. He later became the Faculty of Philology in trades literature at the University of Pristina and joined the group known as Democratic Progress of Kosovo as well as the People's Movement of Kosovo. Later, he was investigated for crimes as a part of the KLA.

== Career ==
Haliti's career began in 1986 when he opposed the Serbian regime in Kosovo by taking part in the communist group called the Resistance Front, which supplied the guerrillas forces in Kosovo with weapons. For this, he was put under surveillance by the Yugoslavian secret police UDBA and was detained for activities related to separatist activities in Yugoslavia. In 1987, Haliti was forced to flee Kosovo for Switzerland, where he met Azem Syla and Ali Ahmeti and joined People's Movement of Kosovo, a communist nationalist group which collected funds for guerrilla groups in Kosovo, although the group later abandoned communism. Later in 1997, when the group was known as the Kosovo Liberation Army, Haliti contributed to the Albanian diaspora, and was acclaimed for his contribution to the issue of national liberation in Kosovo. In 1993, he joined KLA alongside Fatmir Limaj, Jakup Krasniqi, Rexhep Selimi, Hashim Thaqi, Adem Grabovci, and Nait Hasani. Haliti was also given the role of diplomat for the People's Movement of Kosovo, as well as a delegate of the Kosovo delegation in Rambouillet. Subsequently, Haliti became a member of the Party for Democratic Progress of Kosovo, which was later recognized in 1999 as the Democratic Party of Kosovo by the EU. After the liberation of Kosovo, he was elected as a deputy in the Kosovo Assembly in 2007, and later was elected to parliament.

== Criminal activities ==
In January 2011, The Guardian released NATO documents from 2004 that identified Hashim Thaçi as under the control of the Albanian mafia, in particular former KLA chief of logistics Xhavit Haliti. Haliti, who "serves as a political and financial adviser to the prime minister", was described as "highly involved in prostitution, weapons and drugs smuggling". According to the report, Haliti used fake passports to travel abroad, due to being blacklisted in several countries, including the United States. Haliti is also alleged to have drawn on NATO intelligence assessments, along with reports from the FBI and MI5.

== Activities ==
- From 1987 to 1999, he was a member of the Presidency of the PPLPK
- In 1993, he was one of the founders of the KLA
- From 1993 to 1999, he was a member of the KLA
- Since 1999, he has been a member of the Presidency of the PDK
- Since 2001, he has been a member of the Assembly of Kosovo and member of the Presidium of the Assembly of Kosovo in the three legislations
- Since 2007, he has been deputy chairman of the Assembly of Kosovo
