= Bekim Çollaku =

Former Minister of European Integration of Kosovo
- Current coat of arms of Kosovo

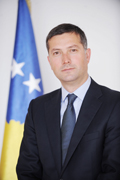
- Incumbent; Bekim Çollaku
- Member of: Government of the Republic of Kosovo
- Seat: Government Building, Pristina, Kosovo

Bekim Çollaku was Minister of European Integration of Kosovo. He previously served as the Chief of Staff of the Prime Minister of Kosovo Hashim Thaçi between 2007 and 2014. Prior to joining the Cabinet of Prime Minister Thaçi, he worked as Assistant Lecturer at Prishtina University, Department of Political Sciences and as a researcher in the Kosovar Institute for Policy Research and Development.

Çollaku was a member of the Kosovo negotiating team in the EU facilitated Political Dialogue for Normalization of Relations between Kosovo and Serbia between 2011 and 2014.

He served as Political Advisor to the first elected Kosovo Prime Minister Bajram Rexhepi between 2003 and 2004.

Bekim Çollaku is a member of the Democratic Party of Kosovo (Albanian: Partia Demokratike e Kosovës – PDK).

In his position as the Minister of European Integration Çollaku played the role of Kosovo's chief negotiator in the negotiations between the European Commission and Kosovo for a Stabilisation and Association Agreement. After the approval of the SAA by the Council of the European Union on 22 October 2015 in Luxembourg, Çollaku co-signed the SAA on behalf of Kosovo at the Office of the High Representative Federica Mogherini at the European Parliament in Strasbourg, France on 27 October 2015.

== Education ==
Bekim Çollaku holds a master's degree in International Studies obtained at the University of Newcastle upon Tyne in United Kingdom and currently is a PhD candidate in Political Science at Ghent University, Belgium. His academic background is in the field of International Relations, with a particular focus on the European Union’s foreign policy (CFSP/CSDP).

== Personal life ==
Bekim Çollaku is married to Aferdita Çollaku and has two children.

== Publications ==
- Ethnic Centralization and the Perils of Confusing Solutions. KIPRED discussion paper, 2007
- Kosovo’s Capacity for EU Integration : Don’t let the grass grow under your feet!. KIPRED policy brief, 2006
- A just finial settlement for Kosovo is imperative for the peace and stability in Balkans. MA Thesis, University of Newcastle, 2003
