= Edita Tahiri =

Kosovar politician and academic

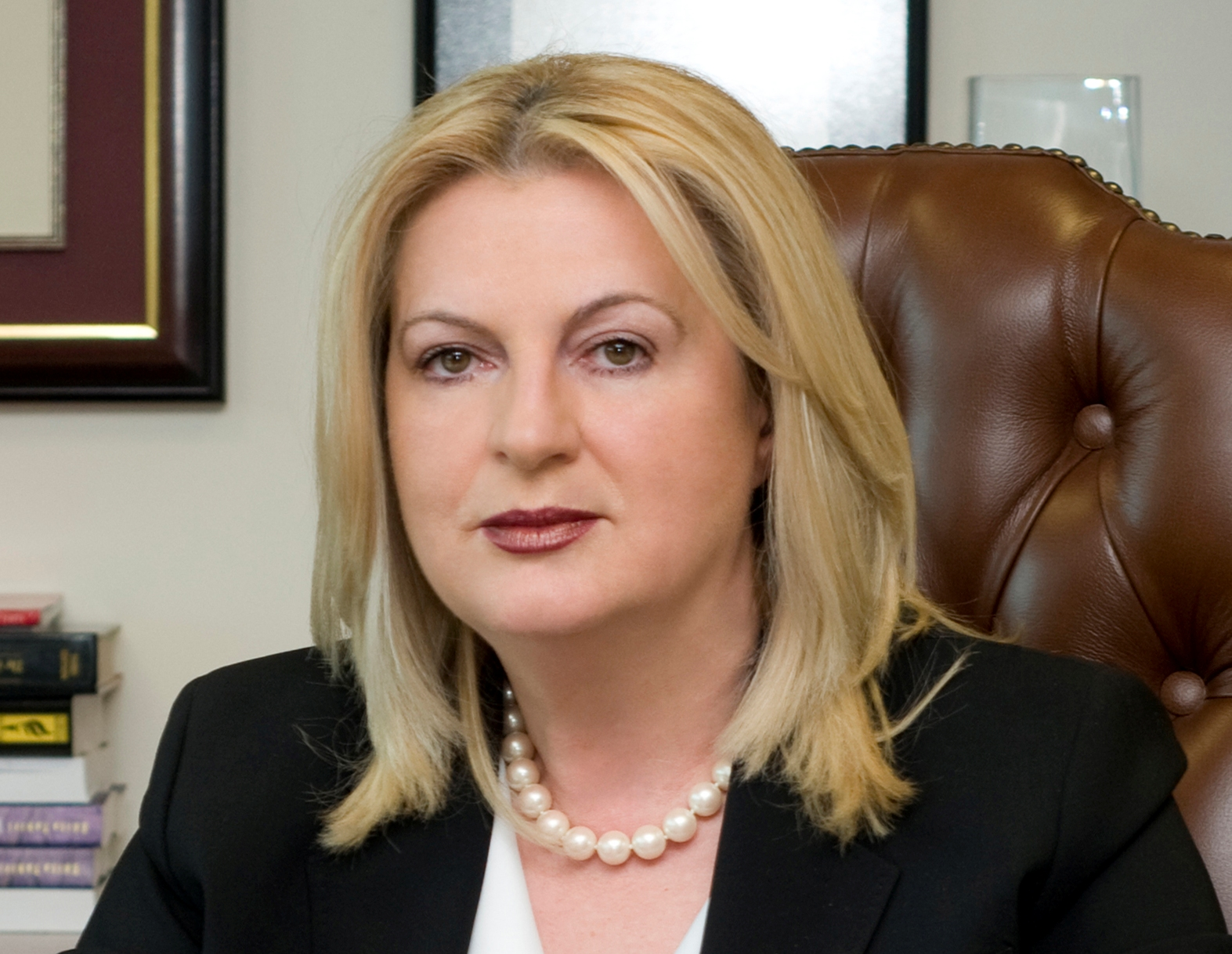

Minister of Dialogue
- In office 9 December 2014 – 9 September 2017
- President: Hashim Thaci
- Prime Minister: Isa Mustafa
- Preceded by: New Office

Deputy Prime Minister of Kosovo
- In office 22 February 2011 – 9 December 2014
- President: Hashim Thaci
- Prime Minister: Isa Mustafa
- Preceded by: Various
- Succeeded by: Hashim Thaçi

Personal details
- Born: 29 July 1956 (age 70) Prizren, Yugoslavia (now Prizren, Kosovo)
- Party: Democratic Alternative of Kosovo - ADK
- Education: Harvard University; University of Pristina; Johns Hopkins University SAIS; University of Essex

Edita Tahiri (born 29 July 1956) is a leader of the independence of Kosovo, the former deputy prime minister, minister of foreign affairs and peace negotiator. She was also minister for dialogue, minister of public administration and member of parliament in five terms. She was the chief negotiator of the Republic of Kosovo for seven years (2011-2017) in the EU facilitated dialogue, with US support, on normalization of neighborly relations with Serbia. She was the Deputy Prime minister responsible for foreign policy and national security (2011–2014). She was the Minister of Foreign Affairs of Kosovo for ten years in difficult time of liberation and independence of Kosovo (1991–2000). She is a signer of the Declaration of Independence of the Republic of Kosovo, on 17 February 2008. She is the President of reformist party, the Democratic Alternative of Kosovo (ADK) and Chair of the Regional Women's Lobby in Southeastern Europe (RWLSEE). She is member of the Women Waging Peace Network. and member of the Mediterranean Women's Mediators Network.

Tahiri is a Kosovan leader of independence and one of the main protagonists in the political changes affecting Kosovo and South Eastern Europe, after the end of the Cold War. She was one of the founders and key leaders of the movement for Kosovo's independence, the Democratic League of Kosovo, in the years 1991–1999. She was the Minister of Foreign Affairs of Republic of Kosovo (1991–2000) and is particularly well known in foreign policy and for her contribution to internationalizing the question of Kosovo and Albanians. She was part of the Kosovo delegation at the Rambouillet Peace Conference (1999) where she contributed to achieving the Rambouillet Agreement, which led to NATO intervention in Kosovo in 1999 and opened up the path to Kosovo's independence. She was also a negotiator for peace talks at earlier phases since the London Peace Conference on disintegration of former Yugoslavia in 1992.

== Education ==
Before engaging in politics and political science, she studied telecommunications and electronics. In 1980 she graduated from the University of Pristina as an electrical and telecommunications engineer and is the author of the book, "Electronics". In 1983 she did post-graduate studies in digital telecommunications at the University of Essex in United Kingdom.

Tahiri is a Harvard University graduate, and she holds a master's degree in public administration from the John F. Kennedy School for Government in 2002. | She also graduated in the Edward S. Mason program for Public Policy and Management, 2002. During her studies at Harvard, John F. Kennedy School Professor and Dean Joseph S. Nye was her tutor. For her academic achievements, she was awarded the title "Outstanding student of 2002" by the John Kennedy School of Government Public Service Fellowship and an "Edward S. Mason Appreciation for an Extraordinary Contribution".

She holds a doctoral degree in political sciences from University of Pristina in cooperation with Johns Hopkins University SAIS in Washington DC, in 2011. Her thesis focuses on the international involvement to help statebuilding in postwar countries with special focus on the case study of Kosovo, under a mentorship of well known American professors I. William Zartman and Alan Kuperman. She was also a Fulbright Scholar in the years 2006–2007 at the Johns Hopkins University – SAIS University, where she did doctoral studies in the Program for Conflict Resolution.

== Political career ==
Tahiri held senior political and state responsibilities during the hard times of Kosovo's occupation and liberation war against Serbia.

With her political philosophy of freedom, democracy and self-determination, she was committed to ensuring that genocide would never again occur against her people.

As well as being Minister of Foreign Affairs, she also held other positions such as: Member of the Presidency of the Democratic League of Kosovo (LDK) from 1991 to 1998; Secretary for External Relations in LDK (1991–1998), Member of parliament of the Republic of Kosovo Parliament (1992–1998; 1998–2000; 2001–2004; 2007–2010), Special Emissary for President Rugova, Head of the Commission for Foreign Affairs in the Kosovo Assembly (1998–2000) and many other positions. She was the spiritual leader of the Women's Forum in LDK and coordinator of Women's Forum from the Presidency of LDK (1991–1998) and also the founder of the Kosovo Center for International Studies (1994).

As foreign minister of Kosovo, Tahiri managed to make the Kosovo question and the unresolved Albanian question well known amongst senior world circles and to secure the support of the international community for the right to self-determination and Kosovo's independence.

In meetings with senior officials and statesmen, including the American Secretary of State, Madeleine Albright, NATO Chief, General Wesley Clark, British Prime Minister Tony Blair, German Chancellor Gerhard Schroeder, French Foreign Minister Hubert Vedrine and many other international personalities, she presented the national cause to world diplomats.

Tahiri participated in all phases of negotiations up to NATO intervention in 1999, including the Rambouillet Conference (1999), the London Conference (1992), and pre Rambouillet negotiations 1998, as part of the G15 and G5 negotiation teams. She has participated in many world conferences, including the Fourth World Women's Conference in Peking 1995; the World Food Summit in Rome 1996; the World Habitat Conference in Istanbul 1996; the First World Conference on Globalization in Santiago de Compostela, in Spain, 1997; sessions of the Parliamentary Assembly of the Council of Europe 1996, 1997 and 1998; the NATO Parliamentary Assembly 1998; OSCE Ambassadors meeting in Vienna 1998; the Lansdowne Conference 1999; the Airlie Conference 2000 and 2002; and the International Conference on the Transfer of Peoples, Tallinn, Estonia, January 1992.

After the end of the war in Kosovo, she was committed to democratic reforms in her political party (LDK) and in her country Kosovo. After 5 years of her reformist efforts, she left to create a new reformist political party, the Kosovo Democratic Alternative (ADK) in May 2004, together with other like-minded reformists. Tahiri has been the President of the Kosovo Democratic Alternative (ADK) since its founding. Since 2007, ADK became a parliamentary party and is in coalition with the Democratic Party of Kosovo (PDK) and since 2010 is part of the Government. She has been committed to empowering women and gender equality as part of her political activity. She is the leader of the Regional Women's Lobby (RWLSEE) which she and other female political leaders in the region formed in 2006. Her academic profile is based on studies of political and technical sciences at the most prestigious universities in the world.

== Writing and lecturing ==
She lectures and writes on political issues, international relations and especially about Kosovo and the Balkans region. Some of her publications are: "Rambouillet Conference: Negotiation process and documents", Dukagjini, Peja,
