= Hashim Thaçi =

Kosovar politician and war criminal (born 1968)

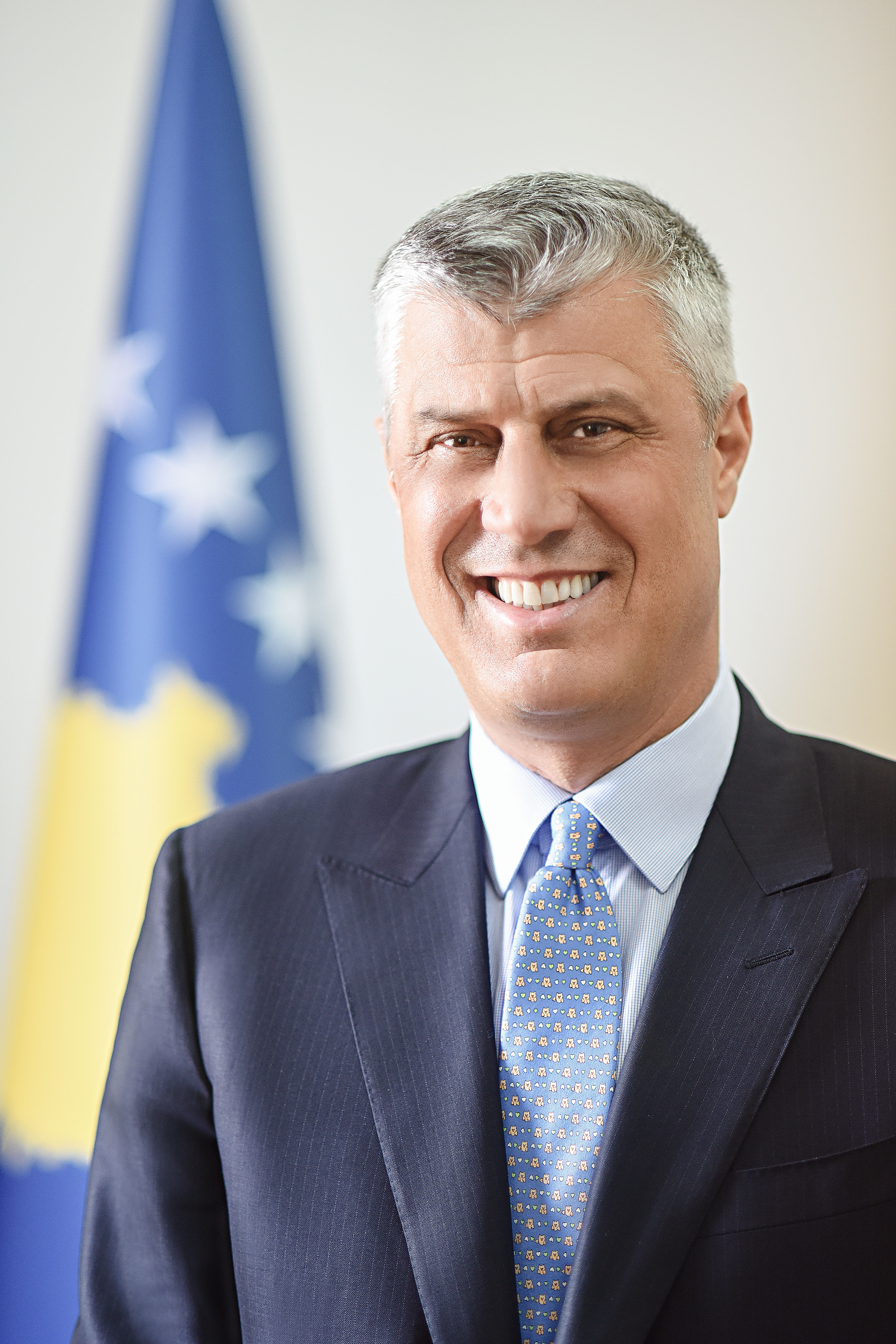
- Official portrait, 2016

President of Kosovo
- In office 7 April 2016 – 5 November 2020
- Prime Minister: Isa Mustafa; Ramush Haradinaj; Albin Kurti; Avdullah Hoti
- Preceded by: Atifete Jahjaga
- Succeeded by: Vjosa Osmani

Minister of Foreign Affairs
- In office 12 December 2014 – 7 April 2016
- Prime Minister: Isa Mustafa
- Preceded by: Enver Hoxhaj
- Succeeded by: Enver Hoxhaj

Prime Minister of Kosovo
- In office 9 January 2008 – 9 December 2014
- President: Fatmir Sejdiu; Behgjet Pacolli; Atifete Jahjaga
- Deputy: Hajredin Kuçi; Ramë Manaj; Behgjet Pacolli; Mimoza Kusari-Lila; Bujar Bukoshi; Edita Tahiri; Slobodan Petrović
- Preceded by: Agim Çeku
- Succeeded by: Isa Mustafa
- In office 2 April 1999 – 1 February 2000 Serving with Bujar Bukoshi (in opposition)
- President: Ibrahim Rugova
- Preceded by: Bujar Bukoshi
- Succeeded by: Himself (Note: Himself as representative in the Interim Administrative Council.)

Representative in the Interim Administrative Council
- In office 15 December 1999 – 4 March 2002 Serving with Ibrahim Rugova, Rexhep Qosja and Rada Trajković
- SRSG: Bernard Kouchner; Hans Hækkerup
- Preceded by: Himself (Note: Himself as Prime Minister in opposition.)
- Succeeded by: Bajram Rexhepi (Note: As Prime Minister.)

Leader of the Democratic Party
- In office 27 October 1999 – 26 February 2016
- Preceded by: Office established
- Succeeded by: Kadri Veseli

Political Director of Kosovo Liberation Army
- In office March 1999 – June 1999
- Preceded by: Adem Demaçi
- Succeeded by: Office abolished

Personal details
- Born: 24 April 1968 (age 58) Srbica, SAP Kosovo, SR Serbia, SFR Yugoslavia (now Skenderaj, Kosovo)
- Party: Independent (2016‍–‍present)
- Other political affiliations: Democratic Party (1999–2016); Democratic League (before 1993)
- Spouse: Lumnije Thaçi
- Children: 1
- Education: University of Pristina; University of Zürich

Military service
- Allegiance: Kosovo Liberation Army
- Service years: 1993–1999
- Rank: Commander
- Battles/wars: Glogovac attack: Insurgency in Kosovo; First Battle of Rezalla; Kosovo War

Hashim Thaçi (Note: Pronounced /ˈhæʃɪm ˈθætʃi/ HASH-im THATCH-ee; Albanian pronunciation: [haˈʃim ˈθatʃi].) (born 24 April 1968) is a Kosovan politician who was the first prime minister of Kosovo (2008–2014) and the foreign minister and deputy prime minister (2014–2016) in the cabinet led by Isa Mustafa. He also served as president of Kosovo from 2016 until his resignation in 2020.

Thaçi is from the region of Drenica in Kosovo, which is where the Kosovo Liberation Army (KLA) originated. He studied philosophy in Pristina before moving to Switzerland, where he joined the KLA in 1993. An Albanian nationalist, he rose through the ranks of the KLA to become leader of the most powerful faction by 1999, during the Rambouillet negotiations. He then joined the interim Kosovo administration after the war.

Thaçi became leader of the Democratic Party of Kosovo (PDK), which won the largest share of the vote in the 2007 Kosovo elections. In 2008, Thaçi read the declaration of independence of Kosovo and became its first prime minister. In 2016 he was elected president of Kosovo. Thaçi pursued a pro-American policy while in office.

In 2020, the Kosovo Specialist Chambers and Specialist Prosecutor's Office in The Hague filed a ten-count indictment against Thaçi and others, charging them with crimes against humanity and war crimes during the Kosovo War. To face these charges, Thaçi resigned from the presidency, stating that he did so to "protect the integrity of the presidency of Kosovo". He was arrested and pleaded not guilty to all charges. His trial opened in April 2023. The Specialist Prosecutor's Office sought a sentence of 45 years imprisonment for war crimes and persecution of Serb and Roma minorities. In September 2026, he was convicted and sentenced by Kosovo Specialist Chambers' first instance Trial Panel to 25 years in prison for war crimes including the murder of 96 people and the torture of 303 people. The Trial Panel found Thaçi not guilty of crimes against humanity. Thaçi's defence lawyers stated that they would appeal the decision.

There have been controversies regarding Thaçi's role in the KLA and allegations about him being involved in organized crime.

== Early life and education ==
Hashim Thaçi was born on 24 April 1969 in the village of Burojë, Skenderaj, SFR Yugoslavia (now Kosovo). His family comes from the Thaçi tribe. Skenderaj is located in the Drenica valley, a region historically resistant to Serbian rule. Drenica would become the birthplace of the Kosovo Liberation Army (KLA) in the early 1990s.

Thaçi studied philosophy and history at the University of Pristina. By 1993, he was living in Switzerland, where he joined the Albanian political émigré group. He registered for postgraduate studies at the University of Zürich in the departments of history and international relations, achieving a master's degree.

As a young man, Thaçi joined the People's Movement of Kosovo (LPK), an underground group committed to overthrowing the Yugoslav government that had been historically financed and ideologically shaped by the regime of Albania's former dictator, Enver Hoxha.

== Role in KLA ==
In 1993, Thaçi became a member of the inner circle of the KLA. The charisma of leaders such as Thaçi helped the KLA gain support from Kosovo Albanians. On 22 May 1993, together with Ilaz Kodra, Thaçi led an attack in Glogovac against Serbian police. The attack was a victory for the KLA; five officers were killed and two were injured.

Thaçi (nom de guerre "Gjarpri" − The Snake) was responsible for securing financial means and armaments, and training recruits in Albania to be dispatched to Kosovo. On 11 July 1997, Thaçi was tried in absentia and convicted by the district court in Pristina for terrorism associated with his activities in the KLA, and sentenced to 10 years in prison.

Thaçi participated in the Battle of Rezalla, the KLA's first major battle, which occurred on 25 November. Many Yugoslav fighters were killed and their artillery and vehicles damaged after they were ambushed by KLA insurgents led by Adem Jashari. As a result, Yugoslav forces retreated to the village of Llausha where they shot two Albanian teachers who worked in the primary school of the village.

In March 1999, Thaçi participated in the Rambouillet negotiations as the leader of the Kosovar Albanian team. Thaçi was perceived by western diplomats during the negotiations as the "voice of reason" within the KLA; his attendance demonstrated a willingness to accept autonomy for Kosovo within Serbia at a time when other rebel leaders rejected any solution short of full national independence.

Thaçi emerged from the final diplomatic settlement as the leader of the strongest faction within a KLA rife with factionalism. He moved quickly to consolidate power, unilaterally naming himself prime minister within a provisional government and allegedly ordering the assassination of the leaders of rival armed factions.

=== Organized crime allegations ===
Thaçi was alleged of having extensive criminal links. During his time as head of the Kosovo Liberation Army, The Washington Times reported that the KLA was financing its activities by trafficking heroin and cocaine into western Europe. The KLA received an estimated $75–100 million from the Albanian diaspora in Europe and the United States. There is a possibility that among donors to the KLA were people involved in illegal activities such as drug trafficking; however, insufficient evidence exists to prove direct KLA involvement.

The BBC reported in 2000 that Thaçi was allegedly central to the criminal activities of the Kosovo Protection Corps (KPC), who reportedly extorted money from businessmen under the guise of "taxes" for his self-appointed government. While the KLA was officially disbanded at the end of armed conflict in Kosovo in 1999, the new Kosovo Protection Corps was composed primarily of former KLA fighters and the Democratic Party of Kosovo (PDK). The party was formed largely from the political leadership of the KLA. A near monopoly on the means of force, based on the absorption of the KLA into the KPC, allowed the Democratic Party of Kosovo to seize control of the machinery of government at the municipal level. The PDK regularly used violence and intimidation of political rivals to maintain local political control and protect criminal enterprises that depend upon cooperation from friendly local authorities.

In 2001, the Democratic Party of Kosovo suffered electoral defeat in the first free elections in the province in 2001. The BBC said at the time, "The tumbling reputation of the former KLA was to have a disastrous effect on the PDK because of the perceived overlap between its political leadership and post-KLA organised crime."

A 2008 analysis of organised crime in Kosovo prepared by the German intelligence service BND and a confidential report contracted by the German military accused Thaçi, Ramush Haradinaj, and Xhavit Haliti, the majority leader of the Kosovo parliament, of far-reaching involvement in organised crime. The BND wrote: "The key players (including Haliti, Haradinaj, and Thaçi) are intimately involved in inter-linkages between politics, business, and organised crime structures in Kosovo." The report accused Thaçi of leading a "criminal network operating throughout Kosovo" by the end of the 1990s. The BND report accused Thaçi of having contacts with the Czech and Albanian mafias. It said that he, together with Haliti, ordered killings by a professional hit man, 'Afrimi', responsible for at least 11 contract murders.

Thaçi has faced other accusations, such as the involvement in the lucrative heroin trade in the 1990s when officers of the Kosovo Liberation Army and their backers were moving staggering quantities of narcotics through an underworld network into Central Europe. Police had long suspected that illegal narcotics were fueling the revolt in Kosovo.

A report to the Council of Europe, written by Dick Marty, issued on 15 December 2010 states that Hashim Thaçi was the leader of the "Drenica Group" in charge of trafficking organs taken from Serbian prisoners. As reported by several international, Serbian, Kosovan and Albanian news agencies, in an interview for Albanian television on 24 December 2010, Thaçi said he would publish information about Marty and Marty's collaborators' names.

BBC News reported having seen a draft of the Council of Europe document, and asserted that it named Thaçi "27 times in as many pages". They said the report charged the former KLA commanders with involvement in organized crime, including organ and drug trafficking. In 2011, Marty clarified that his report implicated Thaçi's close associates but not Thaçi himself.

== Prime Minister of Kosovo ==
=== Victory in 2007 election and declaration of Kosovar independence ===
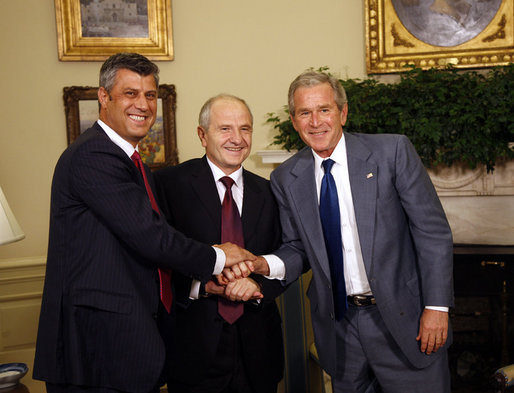
US president George W. Bush shakes hands with Kosovo president Fatmir Sejdiu (center) and Kosovo prime minister Hashim Thaçi (left) during a meeting in the White House on 21 July 2008, after Kosovo declared independence.

Elections were held in Kosovo on 17 November 2007. After early results based on 90 percent of the votes, Hashim Thaçi, who was on course to gain 34 percent, claimed victory for the PDK. He stated his intention to declare independence without delay on 10 December, the date set by the United Nations for the end of negotiations with Serbia. At 45 percent, turnout was particularly low, as most Serbs refused to vote.

On 19 November 2007, several EU foreign ministers warned Thaçi and his allies against proceeding with their declaration of independence without consultations. Luxembourg's Jean Asselborn and Sweden's Carl Bildt urged the PDK not to make any hasty moves, while the EU foreign policy chief Javier Solana stressed the importance of proper preparations prior to formal independence. After EU talks on Kosovo in London on 19 November 2007, the UK's Europe minister, Jim Murphy, said independence without foreign support could isolate the breakaway province.

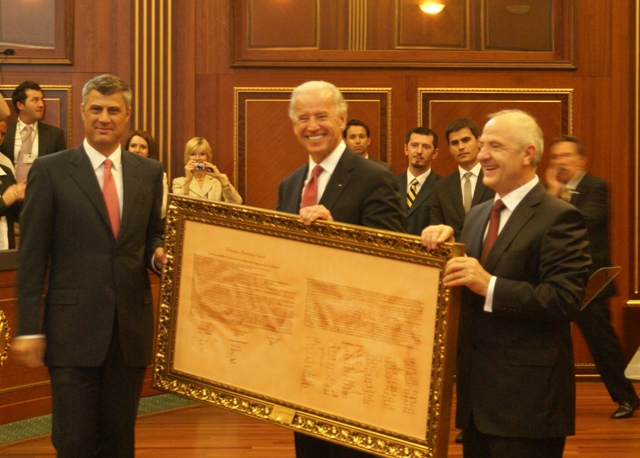
Thaçi and U.S. senator Joe Biden with Declaration of Independence of Kosovo

Thaçi was designated as the next leader of Kosovo's government on 11 December 2007 by the Kosovar president Fatmir Sejdiu and told to form a government "as soon as possible". His Democratic Party of Kosovo (PDK) began coalition talks with the Democratic League of Kosovo (LDK) as well as the Alliance for New Kosovo (AKR). Those parties cumulatively controlled 75 of the assembly's 120 seats.

On 9 January 2008, Thaçi was elected prime minister by parliament, with 85 votes in favor and 22 against. On this occasion, he stated his intention to achieve independence for Kosovo in the first half of 2008.

On 16 February 2008, Thaçi announced that the next day would be key for "implementing the will of the citizens of Kosovo", strongly implying the province would declare independence from Serbia. On 17 February, Kosovo declared its independence from Serbia. Thaçi became prime minister of the newly independent state. On 6 June 2008, a gunman broke into Thaçi's home in Pristina. Thaçi was not in his home when the break-in occurred.

=== Relationships and Coalition with the Democratic League of Kosovo ===
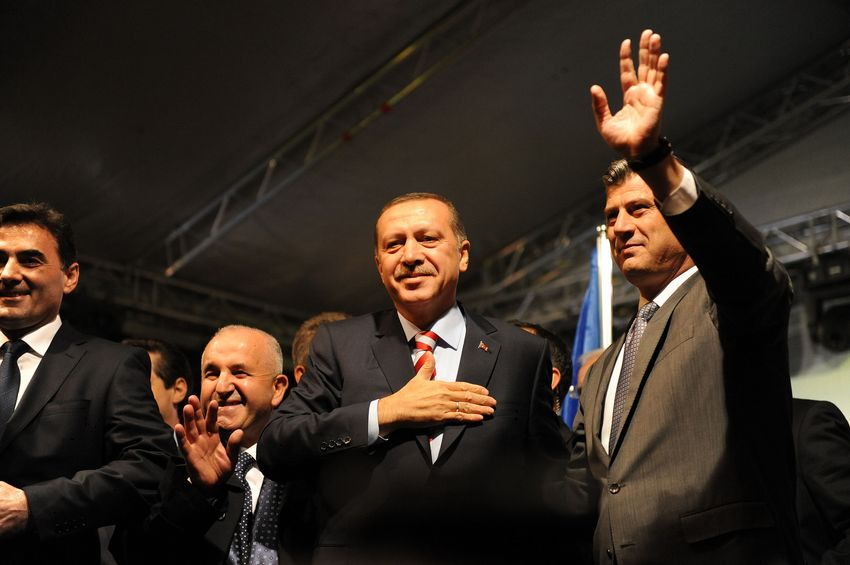
Thaçi and Turkish prime minister Recep Tayyip Erdoğan, 3 November 2010

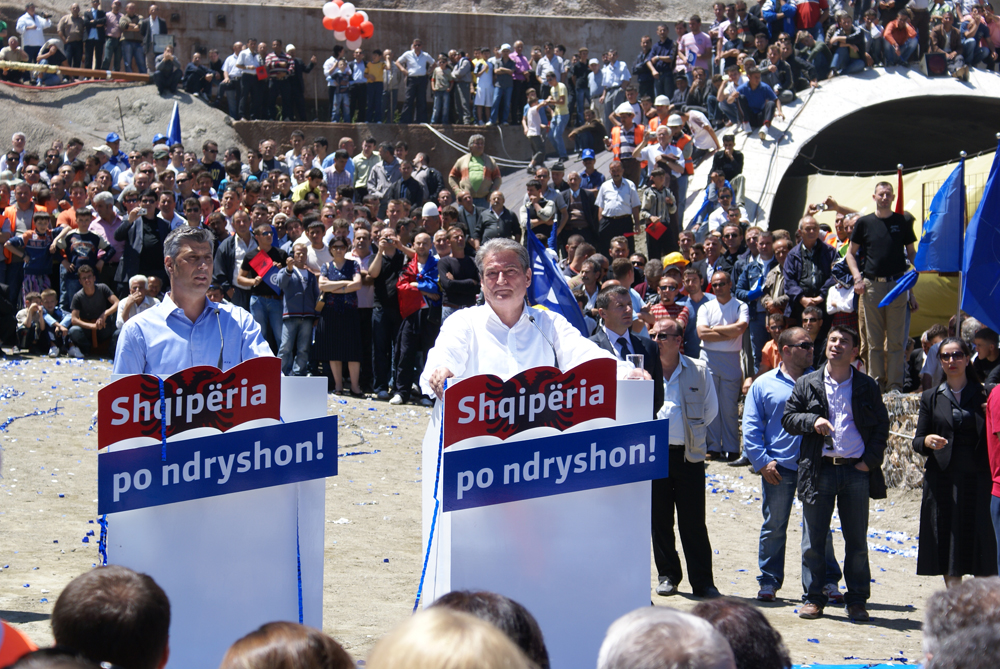
Thaçi and Albanian PM Sali Berisha at the opening of Kalimash tunnel

Position	Portfolio	Name	Party
Prime Minister	General Affairs	Isa Mustafa	LDK
First Deputy Prime Minister and Minister	Foreign Affairs	Hashim Thaçi	PDK
Deputy Prime Minister and Minister	Culture, Youth and Sports	Kujtim Shala	LDK
Deputy Prime Minister	No Portfolio	Branimir Stojanović	Srpska
Minister	Justice	Hajredin Kuçi	PDK
Minister	Administration and Local Self-government	Ljubomir Marić	Srpska
Minister	Communities and Returns	Dalibor Jevtić	Srpska
Minister	Public Administration	Mahir Yağcılar	KDTP
Minister	Education, Science and Technology	Arsim Bajrami	PDK
Minister	Finances	Avdullah Hoti	LDK
Minister	Diaspora	Valon Murati	LB
Minister	Agriculture, Forestry and Rural Development	Memli Krasniqi	PDK
Minister	European Integration	Bekim Çollaku	PDK
Minister	Economic Development	Blerand Stavileci	PDK
Minister	Environment and Spatial Planning	Ferid Agani	PD
Minister	Internal Affairs	Skënder Hyseni	LDK
Minister	Infrastructure	Lutfi Zharku	LDK
Minister	Trade and Industry	Hikmete Bajrami	LDK
Minister	Health	Imet Rrahmani	LDK
Minister	Labour and Social Welfare	Arban Abrashi	LDK
Minister	Security Force	Haki Demolli	LDK
Minister	No Portfolio	Edita Tahiri	ADK
Minister	No Portfolio	Rasim Demiri	Vakat

== President of Kosovo ==
=== 2016 presidential election ===
Thaçi was elected president of Kosovo in February 2016, and took office on 7 April 2016. In August 2019, Thaçi asserted that his nation would hold parliamentary elections on 6 October. The president declared that the nation was in need of a "functional and accountable government" capable enough to face challenges of the state and society.

=== Foreign policy ===
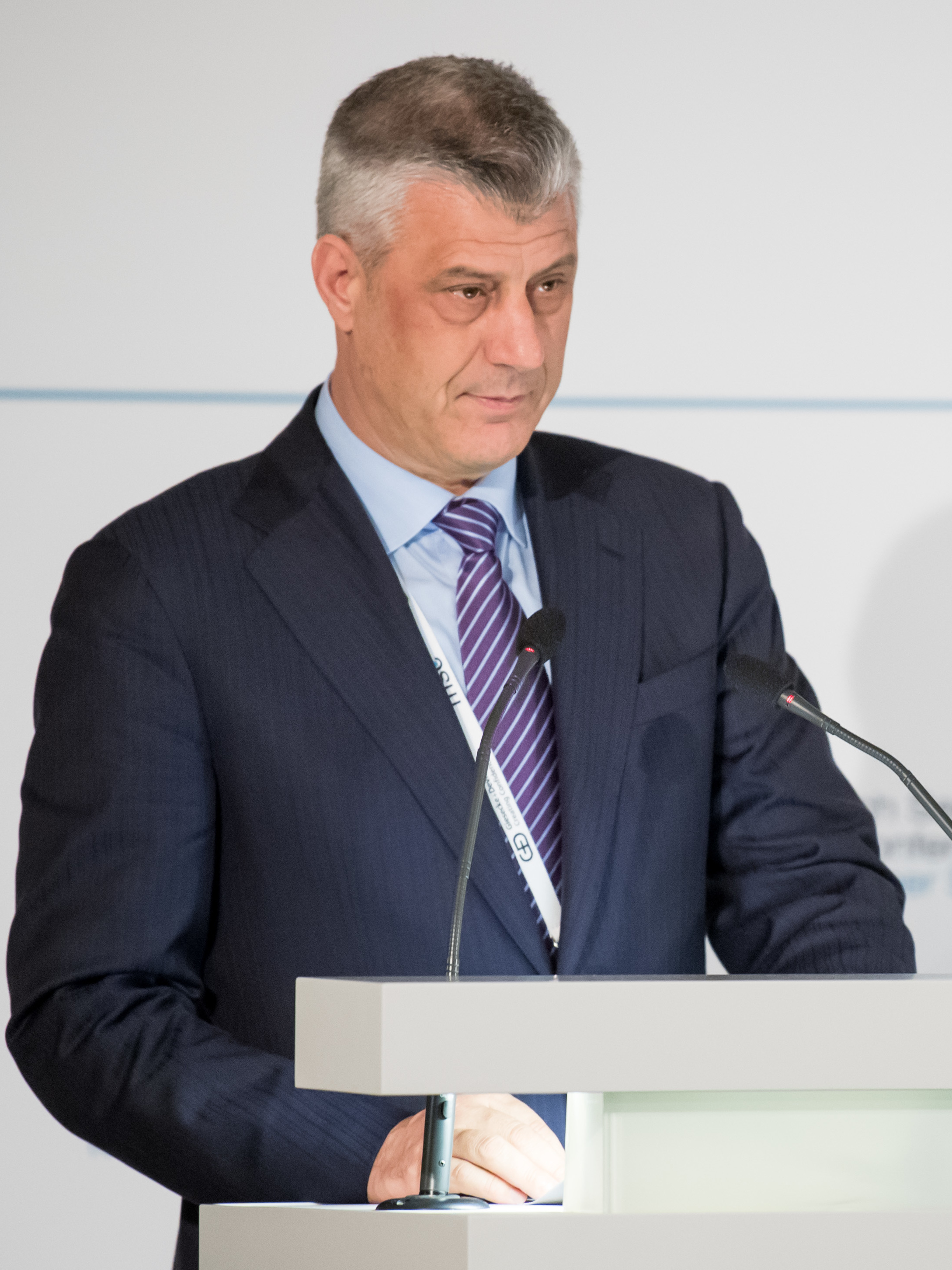
Thaçi during the MSC 2018

In January 2018, Thaçi said that Kosovo would have supported U.S. president Donald Trump's decision to relocate the U.S. embassy from Tel Aviv to Jerusalem, which would have made it the only Muslim-majority nation to do so. Thaçi told Express that if his country was given full United Nations membership, it would vote "all the time" with the U.S., even on the resolution motioned last month to protest Trump's decision. Thaçi met with Trump on the sidelines of the United Nations General Assembly in September 2017 in New York, inviting him to visit Pristina, the capital of Kosovo. According to local media, he said their meeting was "exceptionally friendly, warm."

"The Head of State thanked President Trump for his personal support for Kosovo," his office said in a statement, calling the U.S. a "strategic partner" and saying the support of Washington was "crucial to the peace, stability and overall development of Kosovo and the region." Thaçi told Pristina-based broadcaster RTV21, "President Trump, like all other U.S. presidents, has a clear vision for Kosovo. It is unique support to our country. He said that Kosovo is a wonderful country and that we are a wonderful people."

On 26 November 2019, an earthquake struck Albania. President Thaçi was part of a presidential delegation that visited the earthquake epicentre and expressed his condolences on behalf of Kosovo. In 2019 he met with Trump's special envoy Grenell, and in February 2020 signed an agreement with Serbia's president Vučić.

== Resignation and arrest ==
On 24 April 2020, the Kosovo Specialist Chambers and Specialist Prosecutor's Office (KSC) located in The Hague filed a ten-count indictment for the court's consideration, charging Hashim Thaçi, Kadri Veseli and others for crimes against humanity and war crimes, including murder, enforced disappearance of persons, persecution, and torture. The indictment charged the suspects with approximately 100 murders of Kosovo Albanians, Serbs, Roma, and political opponents. According to the press release, the specialist prosecutor stated that it was necessary to make the issue public due to repeated efforts by Thaçi and Veseli to obstruct and undermine the Kosovo Specialist Chambers. Thaçi was then on a diplomatic visit to the United States, but returned to Kosovo on learning of the indictment.

On 5 November 2020, Thaçi announced his resignation to reporters "to protect the integrity of the presidency of Kosovo". He was arrested the same day and transferred to The Hague. Thaçi was replaced by the speaker of the Assembly of Kosovo, Vjosa Osmani.

== Trial and conviction ==
Thaçi made his initial court appearance on 9 November 2020; he pleaded not guilty. His three co-defendants also pleaded not guilty. The trial opened in April 2023. In December 2024, the KSC filed a new case against Thaçi, in which he was charged with three counts of obstruction of official persons in performing official duties, four counts of violating secrecy of proceedings and four counts of contempt of court over "alleged unlawful efforts to influence witness testimonies" during the trial. In March 2025, Thaçi was temporarily released to visit his ailing father in Pristina. After his father died shortly later, Thaçi was again temporarily released to allow him to visit his father's grave, having been previously barred from attending the funeral.

On 16 September 2026, Thaçi was convicted and sentenced to 25 years' imprisonment. Based on evidence from 273 witnesses, 5,467 pieces of evidence, the KSC found Thaçi guilty together with Veseli, Selemi, and Krasniqi of the murder of 96 political opponents and alleged collaborators with Serbian forces in the 1990s, the illegal detention of 385 people, the torture of 303 and the cruel treatment of 49 as part of a joint criminal enterprise. He and his co-accused were cleared of six charges of crimes against humanity. The KSC stated that Thaçi played a key role in "formulating and implementing the common purpose" of the crimes, and that he "personally participated in crimes, including the arrest, arbitrary detention and interrogation of 13 parliamentarians and the arrest, detention, transfer and murder of Behajdin Allaqi." The KSC found that Thaçi had made false statements about victims and detainees and gave "false assurances of compliance with international humanitarian law on behalf of the KLA."

== Countries visited ==
The table lists state visits made by Hashim Thaçi as president.

#	Country	Year	Cities visited	Type of visit
1	Vatican City	2016, 2017	Vatican City	State visit
2	Albania	2016, 2019, 2020	Tirana, Durrës, Kodër-Thumanë	State visit
3	Brazil	2016	Rio de Janeiro	Rio 2016 Opening Ceremony
4	Turkey	2016	Ankara	State visit
5	Malta	2016	Valletta	State visit
6	Panama	2016	Panama City	State visit
7	United States	2017, 2018, 2019, 2020	Washington, D.C., New York City, Des Moines	State visit, Working visit
8	Jordan	2017	Amman	State visit
9	Austria	2017	Vienna	State visit
10	Croatia	2017	Zagreb	State visit
11	Montenegro	2017	Podgorica	State visit
12	Canada	2017	Halifax, Ottawa	State visit
13	Bulgaria	2017, 2018	Sofia	State visit, Working visit
14	France	2017, 2018, 2019	Paris	State visit, Working visit
15	Switzerland	2018	Davos	Working visit
16	South Korea	2018	Pyeongchang	Pyeongchang 2018 Opening Ceremony
17	North Macedonia	2018, 2019	Skopje	State visit Inauguration of Stevo Pendarovski
18	Armenia	2018	Yerevan	Francophonie Summit
19	Belarus	2018, 2019	Minsk	Working visit
20	Germany	2019, 2020	Munich, Berlin	Working visit
21	Slovakia	2019	Bratislava	Globsec Forum
22	Japan	2019	Tokyo, Osaka	State visit
23	Monaco	2019	Monte Carlo	Working visit

== Honors and awards ==
- Albania: On 20 June 2008 received a copy of the key of the city of Tirana on the occasion of his state visit to Albania.
  - Also on 20 June, Thaçi was awarded the Honorary Citizen of the city of Vlorë for his "historic role in making Kosovo an independent state".
  - In January 2015 Thaçi was awarded the Doctor Honoris Causa from the University of Tirana for his contribution in peace-building in Western Balkans, promoting the process of European integration and achieving the historic Brussels Agreement with Serbia.
  - On 4 October 2016 he was awarded honorary citizenship of Shkodër in a ceremony led by the mayor of the northern Albanian city.
- Switzerland: On 1 July 2012, Thaçi received a doctor honoris causa as a doctor of international relations from the Geneva School of Diplomacy.
- Montenegro: On 4 April 2015, on Ulcinj Day, Thaçi received the title of Honorary Citizen of Ulcinj by the town's municipal government.

== Sources ==
- Andrejevich, Milan (1 March 2009). "Thaçi, Hashim". Encyclopædia Britannica Book of the Year 2009. Encyclopædia Britannica, Inc. pp. 107–108. ISBN 978-1-59339-232-1.

Political offices
Preceded by Bujar Bukoshi	Prime Minister of Kosovo; 1999–2000	Succeeded by Nexhat Daci; Acting
Preceded by Agim Çeku	Prime Minister of Kosovo; 2008–2014	Succeeded by Isa Mustafa
Preceded by Enver Hoxhaj	Minister of Foreign Affairs; 2014–2016	Succeeded by Petrit Selimi; Acting
Preceded by Atifete Jahjaga	President of Kosovo; 2016–2020	Succeeded by Vjosa Osmani; Acting
Party political offices
Preceded by Office established	Leader of the Democratic Party; 1999–2016	Succeeded by Kadri Veseli
