= Burojë =

Village in Skenderaj, Kosovo

Burojë Броћна Broćna
- Village
- Location within Kosovo
- Coordinates: 42.692410°N 20.674808°E
- Country: Kosovo
- District: Mitrovica
- Municipality: Skenderaj

Population (2024)
  - Total: 1,206
- Time zone: UTC+1 (CET)
  - Summer (DST): UTC+2 (CEST)

Burojë is a village in the municipality of Skenderaj, Kosovo. The village is home to 1,206 inhabitants and it's around 15 km (9.3 mi) away from both, Skenderaj and Klina.

== History ==
=== Kosovo War ===
In May 1998, the Kosovo Liberation Army (KLA) had attacked Yugoslav positions in the village and eventually managed to drive out the Yugoslav forces from Burojë.

== Notable people ==
- Hashim Thaçi, politician, former prime minister and president of Kosovo
- Ilir Shaqiri, singer
