= Special forces of Albania =

There are several special forces units of the Republic of Albania (forcat speciale), either as part of the Albanian Armed Forces or Albanian State Police.

== Units ==
=== Active ===
Force	Branch	Ministry
RENEA	Albanian State Police	Ministry of Internal Affairs (Albania)
Special Operations Regiment (Albania)	Albanian Armed Forces	Minister of Defence (Albania)
Commando Battalion (Albania)	Albanian Armed Forces	Minister of Defence (Albania)
