= Ilir Shaqiri (singer) =

Kosovar singer (born 1960)

- Born: 6 December 1960 (age 65); Burojë, Skenderaj, Yugoslavia (now Kosovo)
- Occupations: singer; songwriter
- Years active: 1978 - Today
- Notable work: Fjalët e qiririt; Ushtar Kavaja
- Musical career
- Genres: Albanian folk music

Ilir Shaqiri (born 6 December 1960) is a Kosovo Albanian singer, songwriter and author. He is known for his extensive musical output, humanitarian engagement through music and his involvement in cultural and artistic activities during and after the Kosovo War. Shaqiri is regarded as a prominent figure in Albanian popular and patriotic music.

== Early life and education ==
Ilir Shaqiri was born in the village of Burojë, in the municipality of Skenderaj. He completed his primary education in Turiqec and secondary education in Prizren. He later pursued higher education in Albanian language and literature in Prizren and Pristina, where he earned a master's degree in literature. Alongside his academic formation, he cultivated a strong interest in music, poetry and song writing from an early age.

== Career ==
Shaqiri began his music career in the 1980s, developing a repertoire that combines elements of light music, folk traditions and patriotic themes. Over the decades, he has written and performed hundreds of songs and has appeared in more than a thousand concerts across Kosovo, Albania, North Macedonia and throughout the Albanian diaspora.

A significant portion of his performances have been organized for humanitarian causes, particularly during periods of political unrest and social hardship in Kosovo. During the war, Shaqiri was associated with the cultural and artistic activities of the Kosovo Liberation Army (UÇK), contributing songs and performances intended to boost morale and preserve national identity.

In line with his musical career, Shaqiri has been active in literary and cultural life. He is a member of the Kosovo Writers’ League and has published literary works, including poetry and prose, which reflect similar thematic concerns to those found in his music.

== Musical style ==
Shaqiri's music is characterized by a fusion of contemporary popular forms with traditional Albanian melodic and lyrical elements. His songs frequently address subjects of homeland, sacrifice, humanitarian solidarity and cultural memory, contributing to his reputation as a representative voice of Albanian patriotic song.

== Discography ==
=== Selected albums ===
- Tan Temali
- Këngë për Atdheun
- Zëri i Tokës
- Rrugë Lirie

=== Selected songs ===
- Falë të qoftë gjaku Kosovë
- Djem petrita ka rrit Drenica
- Luma e kuqe ka lidh besë
- Fjalët e qiririt
- Udhët e mia
- Jam Evropë
- Sërish vjen Marsi
- Ushtar Kavaja
