= Collision zone =

Where tectonic plates meet at a convergent boundary

A collision zone occurs when tectonic plates meet at a convergent boundary both bearing continental lithosphere. As continental lithosphere is usually not subducted due to its relatively low density, the result is a complex area of orogeny involving folding and thrust faulting as the blocks of continental crust pile up above the subduction zone. This includes the Eastern Anatolian collision zone and Banda Arc–Australian collision zone.

== See also ==
- List of tectonic plate interactions
