= Kodër-Thumanë =

- Administrative unit
- Location within Albania
- Coordinates: 41°33′N 19°41′E
- Country: Albania
- County: Durrës
- Municipality: Krujë

Population (2011)
  - Administrative unit: 12,335
- Time zone: UTC+1 (CET)
  - Summer (DST): UTC+2 (CEST)

Kodër-Thumanë is a village and a former municipality in the Durrës County, western Albania. At the 2015 local government reform it became a subdivision of the municipality Krujë. The population at the 2011 census was 12,335.
