= Timeline of United Nations peacekeeping missions =

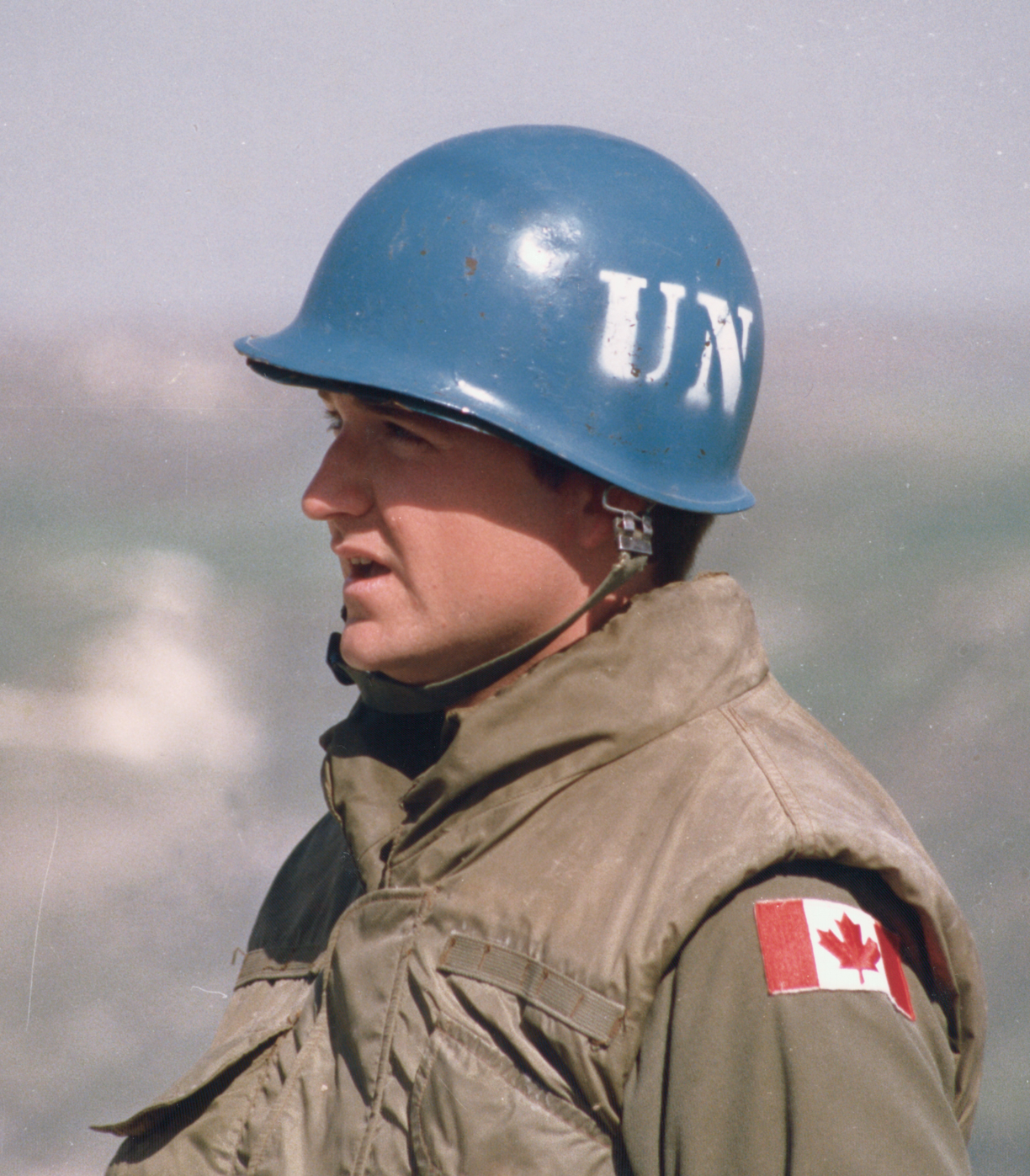
Canadian peacekeeper in 1976 wearing the distinctive UN blue helmet

The United Nations has authorized 72 peacekeeping operations as of April 2018. These do not include interventions authorized by the UN like the Korean War and the Gulf War. The 1990s saw the most UN peacekeeping operations to date. Peacekeeping operations are overseen by the Department of Peacekeeping Operations (DPKO) and share some common characteristics, namely the inclusion of a military or police component, often with an authorization for use of force under Chapter VII of the Charter of the United Nations. Peacekeeping operations are distinct from special political missions (SPMs), which are overseen by the Department of Political Affairs (DPA). SPMs are not included in the table below.

== 1940s ==
Start	End	Name	Acronym	Location	Purpose	Comment
1948	Ongoing	UN Truce Supervision Organization	UNTSO	Israel Syria Lebanon Jordan Egypt	To monitor ceasefire in the Arab-Israeli conflict.	Authorized in June 1948 after the First Arab-Israeli War. The first UN peacekeeping mission.
1949	Ongoing	UN Military Observer Group in India and Pakistan	UNMOGIP	India Pakistan	To monitor India-Pakistan ceasefire in the Kashmir conflict.	Authorized after the First Indo-Pakistani War.

== 1950s ==
Start	End	Name	Acronym	Location	Purpose	Comment
1956	1967	UN Emergency Force I	UNEF I	Egypt	To supervise withdrawal of Egyptian and Israeli troops from Suez Crisis.	First armed peacekeepers. Ended June 1967 during the buildup to the Six-Day War.
1958	1958	UN Observation Group in Lebanon	UNOGIL	Lebanon	To prevent troops and weapons entering Lebanon during crisis.	Ended December 1958

== 1960s ==
Start	End	Name	Acronym	Location	Purpose	Comment
1960	1964	UN Operation in the Congo	ONUC	Republic of the Congo (Léopoldville)	To prevent foreign intervention in and preserve territory of the Congo during the Congo Crisis.	Ended June 1964
1962	1963	UN Security Force and UN Temporary Executive Authority	UNSF / UNTEA	UN-administered West New Guinea	Monitor ceasefire during transition of Western New Guinea from Dutch to Indonesian rule.	Ended April 1963
1963	1964	UN Yemen Observation Mission	UNYOM	North Yemen	Supervise disengagement of Saudi Arabia and Egypt from the North Yemeni Civil War.	Ended September 1964
1964	Ongoing	UN Peacekeeping Force in Cyprus	UNFICYP	Cyprus	Prevent conflict between Greek and Turkish Cypriots.	
1965	1966	Mission of the Representative of the Secretary-General in the Dominican Republic	DOMREP	Dominican Republic	Monitor situation caused by rival governments in Dominican Republic.	Ended October 1966
1965	1966	UN India-Pakistan Observation Mission	UNIPOM	India Pakistan	Supervise India-Pakistan ceasefire outside of Kashmir after the Second Indo-Pakistani War.	Ended March 1966

== 1970s ==
Start	End	Name	Acronym	Location	Purpose	Comment
1973	1979	UN Emergency Force II	UNEF II	Egypt	Supervise withdrawal of forces from the Sinai Peninsula after Egypt, Syria and Israel fought in the Yom Kippur War.	Ended July 1979
1974	Ongoing	UN Disengagement Observer Force	UNDOF	Golan Heights (disputed between Israel and Syria)	Maintain ceasefire between Syria and Israel on the Golan Heights.	
1978	Ongoing	UN Interim Force in Lebanon	UNIFIL	Lebanon	Supervise Israeli withdrawal from Lebanon. Keep the international peace and security, and help the Lebanese Government restore its effective authority in the area.	

== 1980s ==
Start	End	Name	Acronym	Location	Purpose	Comment
1988	1990	UN Good Offices Mission in Afghanistan and Pakistan	UNGOMAP	Afghanistan Pakistan	Enforce Afghanistan and Pakistan from mutual non-interference.	Ended March 1990
1988	1991	UN Iran-Iraq Military Observer Group	UNIIMOG	Iraq Iran	Supervise ceasefire after the Iran-Iraq War.	Ended February 1991
1989	1991	UN Angola Verification Mission I	UNAVEM I	Angola	Supervise withdrawal of Cuban troops from the Angolan Civil War.	Ended June 1991
1989	1990	UN Transition Assistance Group	UNTAG	South West Africa (Namibia after 1990)	Supervise Namibia's elections and transition to independence from South Africa.	Ended March 1990
1989	1992	UN Observer Group in Central America	ONUCA	Nicaragua	Monitor ceasefire in the Nicaraguan Civil War.	Ended January 1992

== 1990s ==
Start	End	Name	Acronym	Location	Purpose	Comment
1991	2003	UN Iraq-Kuwait Observation Mission	UNIKOM	Kuwait Iraq	Enforce Kuwait-Iraq border after Gulf War.	Ended 2003
1991	1995	UN Angola Verification Mission II	UNAVEM II	Angola	Enforce ceasefire in the Angolan Civil War.	Ended February 1995
1991	1995	UN Observer Mission in El Salvador	ONUSAL	El Salvador	Enforce ceasefire in the Salvadoran Civil War.	Ended April 1995
1991	2026	UN Mission for the Referendum in Western Sahara	MINURSO	Western Sahara	Implement ceasefire and help promote referendum on area's future after the Western Sahara War.	Mandate expired 1 November 2026
1991	1992	UN Advance Mission in Cambodia	UNAMIC	Cambodia	Prepare way for UN Transitional Authority in Cambodia after the Cambodian–Vietnamese War.	Ended March 1992
1992	1995	UN Protection Force	UNPROFOR and UNPREDEP	Croatia Bosnia and Herzegovina Republic of Macedonia	Protect area of Croatia, Bosnia and Herzegovina, and the Republic of Macedonia during the Yugoslav Wars.	restructured December 1995
1992	1993	UN Transitional Authority in Cambodia	UNTAC	Cambodia	Assist reorganization of Cambodia.	Ended September 1993
1992	1993	UN Operation in Somalia I	UNOSOM I	Somalia	Enforce ceasefire during the Somali Civil War, reorganized as Unified Task Force (UNITAF)	Replaced March 1993 by UNOSOM II
1992	1993	UN Observer Mission to Verify the Referendum in Eritrea	UNOVER	Ethiopia	Monitor referendum for independence of Eritrea from Ethiopia.	Ended April 1993
1992	1994	UN Operation in Mozambique	ONUMOZ	Mozambique	Monitor ceasefire in the Mozambican Civil War.	Ended December 1994
1993	1995	UN Operation in Somalia II	UNOSOM II	Somalia	Stabilize Somalia and assist humanitarian efforts during the Somali Civil War.	Ended March 1995
1993	1994	UN Observer Mission Uganda-Rwanda	UNOMUR	Rwanda Uganda	To enforce ceasefire between Rwanda and the rebel group based in Uganda during the Rwandan Civil War.	Ended September 1994
1993	2009	UN Observer Mission in Georgia	UNOMIG	Georgia Abkhazia (independence from Georgia not recognized by international community)	Enforce ceasefire between Georgia and Abkhaz separatists after the Abkhaz War.	Russia vetoed extension in June 2009
1993	1996	UN Observer Mission in Liberia	UNOMIL	Liberia	Monitor ceasefire and elections after the First Liberian Civil War.	Ended September 1997
1993	1996	UN Mission in Haiti	UNMIH	Haiti	Stabilize Haiti after coup overturned.	Ended June 1996
1993	1996	UN Assistance Mission for Rwanda	UNAMIR	Rwanda	Monitor ceasefire, and after the Rwandan Genocide to promote relief efforts.	Ended March 1996
1994	1994	UN Aouzou Strip Observer Group	UNASOG	Chad	Monitor Libya's withdrawal from disputed territory given by International Court of Justice to Chad.	Ended June 1994
1994	2002	UN Mission of Observers in Tajikistan	UNMOT	Tajikistan	Monitor ceasefire in the Tajikistani Civil War.	Ended May 2000
1995	1997	UN Angola Verification Mission III	UNAVEM III	Angola	Monitor ceasefire and disarmament.	Ended June 1997, but follow-up mission MONUA
1995	1996	UN Confidence Restoration Operation in Croatia	UNCRO	Croatia	Attempts to implement ceasefire in the Croatian War.	Ended January 1996
1995	1999	UN Preventive Deployment Force	UNPREDEP	Republic of Macedonia	Replaced UNPROFOR in the Republic of Macedonia and monitored border with Albania.	Ended February 1999
1995	2002	UN Mission in Bosnia and Herzegovina	UNMIBH	Bosnia and Herzegovina	Monitor human rights, demining, relief after the Bosnian War.	Ended 31 December 2002
1996	1998	UN Transitional Administration for Eastern Slavonia, Baranja, and Western Sirmium	UNTAES	UN-administered Eastern Slavonia, Baranja and Western Syrmia	Supervises integration of region into Croatia.	Ended January 1998
1996	2002	UN Mission of Observers in Prevlaka	UNMOP	Croatia	Monitor demilitarization of the Prevlaka peninsula, Croatia.	Ended December 2002
1996	1997	UN Support Mission in Haiti	UNSMIH	Haiti	Modernize police and army of Haiti.	Ended July 1997
1997	1997	UN Verification Mission in Guatemala	MINUGUA	Guatemala	Monitor ceasefire in the Guatemalan Civil War.	Ended May 1997
1997	1999	UN Observer Mission in Angola	MONUA	Angola	Monitoring ceasefire and disarmament.	Ended February 1999
1997	1997	UN Transition Mission in Haiti	UNTMIH	Haiti	Help stabilize Haiti.	Ended November 1997
1997	2000	UN Civilian Police Mission in Haiti	MIPONUH	Haiti	Modernize Haiti's police forces.	Ended March 2000
1998	1998	UN Civilian Police Support Group	UNPSG	Croatia	Monitor Croatian police	Ended October 1998
1998	2000	UN Mission in the Central African Republic	MINURCA	Central African Republic	Maintaining security and stability in Central African Republic	Ended February 2000
1998	1999	UN Observer Mission in Sierra Leone	UNOMSIL	Sierra Leone	Monitor disarmament and demobilization in the Sierra Leone Civil War.	Ended October 1999
1999	Ongoing	UN Interim Administration Mission in Kosovo	UNMIK	UN-administered Kosovo (later Kosovo, claimed by Serbia)	Exercise administrative authority, including administration of justice in Kosovo	
1999	2005	UN Mission in Sierra Leone	UNAMSIL	Sierra Leone	Help stabilize and disarm Sierra Leone	Ended December 2005
1999	1999	UN Mission in East Timor	UNAMET	Indonesia (Occupied East Timor)	To oversee popular consultation on political relation to Indonesia	Ended 1999, See UNTAET the follow-up mission.
1999	2002	UN Transitional Administration in East Timor	UNTAET	UN-administered East Timor	Transition East Timor to independence	Ended May 2002. See UNMISET the follow-up mission.
1999	2010	UN Organization Mission in Democratic Republic of the Congo	MONUC	Democratic Republic of the Congo	Monitor ceasefire in Democratic Republic of the Congo	Ended June 2010. See MONUSCO the follow-up mission.

== 2000s ==
Start	End	Name	Acronym	Location	Purpose	Comment
2000	2008	UN Mission in Ethiopia and Eritrea	UNMEE	Ethiopia Eritrea	Enforce ceasefire after the Eritrean–Ethiopian War.	Ended July 2008 after both Eritrea (forced out UN troops) and Ethiopia (refused to accept ICJ ruling on the border) refused to cooperate
2002	2005	United Nations Mission of Support in East Timor	UNMISET	East Timor	To ensure security and stabilise the nascent state during the post-independence period.	Ended May 2005
2003	2018	United Nations Mission in Liberia	UNMIL	Liberia	Oversee ceasefire and train national police after the Second Liberian Civil War.	
2004	2017	United Nations Operation in Côte d'Ivoire	UNOCI	Cote d'Ivoire	Facilitate implementation of peace process after the First Ivorian Civil War	
2004	2017	United Nations Stabilization Mission in Haiti	MINUSTAH	Haiti	Return stability to Haiti	Later Coordinated security response to the 2010 Haiti earthquake
2004	2006	United Nations Operation in Burundi	ONUB	Burundi	To help implement the Arusha accords	ended December 2006, replaced by BINUB
2005	2011	United Nations Mission in the Sudan	UNMIS	Sudan	To support implementation of the Comprehensive Peace Agreement after the Second Sudanese Civil War, perform certain functions relating to humanitarian assistance, and protection and promotion of human rights	ended in July 2011, succeeded by UNMISS.
2006	2012	United Nations Integrated Mission in Timor-Leste	UNMIT	East Timor	To support the Government in consolidating stability, enhancing a culture of democratic governance, and facilitating political dialogue among Timorese stakeholders, in their efforts to bring about a process of national reconciliation and to foster social cohesion	
2007	2020	United Nations African Union Mission in Darfur	UNAMID	Sudan	To monitor arms trade and shipping, to cause and keep a ceasefire during the War in Darfur.	
2007	2010	United Nations Mission in the Central African Republic and Chad	MINURCAT	Central African Republic Chad	Established due to refugee crisis from the Darfur genocide in Sudan.	ended December 2010 due to opposition by Chadian government

== 2010s ==
Start	End	Name	Acronym		Purpose	Comment
2010	Ongoing	UN Organization Stabilization Mission in the Democratic Republic of the Congo	MONUSCO	Democratic Republic of the Congo	Monitor ceasefire in Democratic Republic of the Congo	
2011	Ongoing	UN Interim Security Force for Abyei	UNISFA	Abyei Area (disputed by Sudan and South Sudan)	Monitor ceasefire in Abyei	
2011	Ongoing	UN Mission in the Republic of South Sudan	UNMISS	South Sudan	Assist the new state of South Sudan	
2012	2012	UN Support Mission in Syria	UNSMIS	Syria	Monitor the ceasefire agreement in the Syrian Civil War.	
2013	2023	UN Multidimensional Integrated Stabilization Mission in Mali	MINUSMA	Mali	Stabilize the country after the 2012 Tuareg rebellion	
2014	Ongoing	UN Multidimensional Integrated Stabilization Mission in the Central African Republic	MINUSCA	Central African Republic	Protect civilians during Central African Republic Civil War	
2017	2019	UN Mission for Justice Support in Haiti	MINUJUSTH	Haiti	Assist the Government to further develop the Haitian National Police (HNP); to strengthen Haiti's rule of law institutions, including the justice and prisons; and to promote and protect human rights in Haiti	

== See also ==
- League of Nations, predecessor of the United Nations
- History of United Nations peacekeeping
- List of UN peacekeeping missions
- List of countries where UN peacekeepers are currently deployed
- List of territories governed by the United Nations
