= List of United Nations peacekeeping missions =

List of all former and current United Nations peacekeeping missions

Current Missions Past Missions

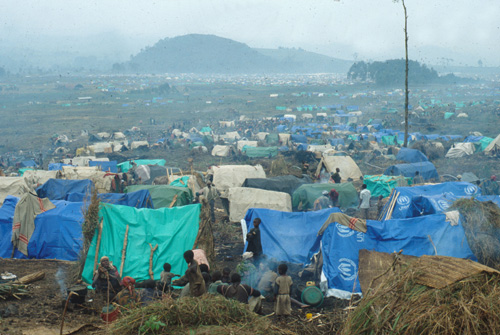
UN refugee camp in eastern Democratic Republic of Congo.

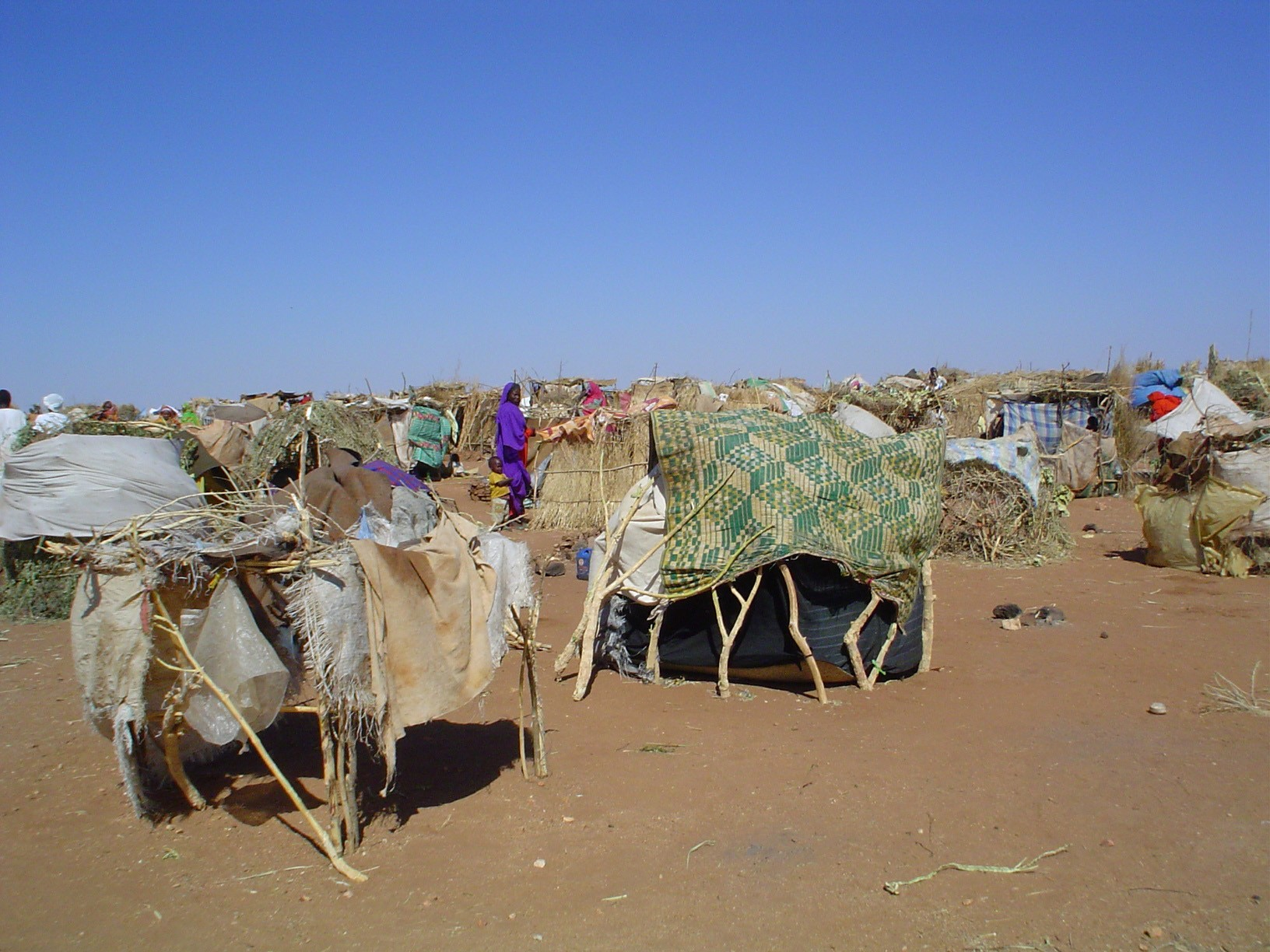
IDP camp in Sudan resulting from the Darfur conflict.

This is the full list of United Nations peacekeeping missions since the United Nations was founded in 1945, organized by region, with the dates of deployment, the name of the related conflict, and the name of the UN operation.

Peacekeeping, as defined by the United Nations, is a way to help countries torn by conflict create conditions for sustainable peace. UN peacekeepers—soldiers, military officers, police officers and civilian personnel from many countries—monitor and observe peace processes that emerge in post-conflict situations and assist ex-combatants in implementing the peace agreements they have signed. Such assistance comes in many forms, including confidence-building measures, power-sharing arrangements, electoral support, strengthening the rule of law, and economic and social development.

The Charter of the United Nations gives the Security Council the power and responsibility to take collective action to maintain international peace and security. For this reason, the international community usually looks to the Security Council to authorize peacekeeping operations. Most of these operations are established and implemented by the United Nations itself with troops serving under UN operational command. In other cases, where direct UN involvement is not considered appropriate or feasible, the Council authorises regional organisations such as the North Atlantic Treaty Organisation, the Economic Community of West African States or coalitions of willing countries to implement certain peacekeeping or peace enforcement functions. In modern times, peacekeeping operations have evolved into many different functions, including diplomatic relations with other countries, international bodies of justice (such as the International Criminal Court), and eliminating problems such as landmines that can lead to new incidents of fighting.

== Current missions (10) ==
=== Africa ===
Dates of operation	Name of operation	Location	Conflict	Website
2010	United Nations Organisation Stabilisation Mission in the Democratic Republic of the Congo (MONUSCO)	Democratic Republic of the Congo	Kivu conflict	
2011	United Nations Interim Security Force for Abyei (UNISFA)	Abyei Area	Abyei conflict	
2011	United Nations Mission in the Republic of South Sudan (UNMISS)	South Sudan	Ethnic violence in South Sudan; South Sudanese Civil War	
2014	United Nations Multidimensional Integrated Stabilisation Mission in the Central African Republic (MINUSCA)	Central African Republic	Central African Republic Civil War	

=== Asia ===
Dates of operation	Name of operation	Location	Conflict	Website
1949	United Nations Military Observer Group in India and Pakistan (UNMOGIP)	India	Kashmir conflict	
1949	United Nations Military Observer Group in India and Pakistan (UNMOGIP)	Pakistan	Kashmir conflict	

=== Europe ===
Dates of operation	Name of operation	Location	Conflict	Website
1964	United Nations Peacekeeping Force in Cyprus (UNFICYP)	Cyprus	Cyprus dispute	
1964	United Nations Peacekeeping Force in Cyprus (UNFICYP)	Northern Cyprus	Cyprus dispute	
1999	United Nations Interim Administration Mission in Kosovo (UNMIK)	Serbia	Kosovo War	
1999	United Nations Interim Administration Mission in Kosovo (UNMIK)	Kosovo	Kosovo War	

=== West Asia ===
Dates of operation	Name of operation	Location	Conflict	Website
1948	United Nations Truce Supervision Organisation (UNTSO)	Middle East	(Monitors the various ceasefires and assists UNDOF and UNIFIL)	
1974	United Nations Disengagement Observer Force (UNDOF)	Israel	Agreed withdrawal by Syrian and Israeli forces following the Yom Kippur War.	
1974	United Nations Disengagement Observer Force (UNDOF)	Syria	Agreed withdrawal by Syrian and Israeli forces following the Yom Kippur War.	
1974	United Nations Disengagement Observer Force (UNDOF)	Lebanon	Agreed withdrawal by Syrian and Israeli forces following the Yom Kippur War.	
1978	United Nations Interim Force in Lebanon (UNIFIL)	Lebanon	Israeli invasion of Lebanon and 2006 Israel-Lebanon conflict	

1. The United Nations and all foreign governments but Turkey recognise the sovereignty of the Republic of Cyprus, whose flag is shown first, over the whole island of Cyprus. The second flag is that of the Turkish Republic of Northern Cyprus, a de facto state, by virtue of controlling the northern third of the island, which is recognised only by Turkey.

2. The first flag is the flag of Serbia, used by Republic of Serbia which claims sovereignty over Kosovo. The second is the flag of the Republic of Kosovo which is in de facto control over the territory. As of 19 December 2025, it is recognised by 103 UN member countries. For more information see Kosovo.

== Completed missions (64) ==
=== Africa ===
Dates of operation	Name of operation	Location	Conflict	Website
1960–1964	United Nations Operation in the Congo (ONUC)	Republic of the Congo	Congo Crisis	
1988–1991	United Nations Angola Verification Mission I (UNAVEM I)	Angola	Angolan Civil War	
1989–1990	United Nations Transition Assistance Group (UNTAG)	South West Africa (Namibia after 1990)	Namibian War of Independence	
1991–1995	United Nations Angola Verification Mission II (UNAVEM II)	Angola	Angolan Civil War	
1991-2026	United Nations Mission for the Referendum in Western Sahara (MINURSO)	Western Sahara	Western Sahara conflict	
1992–1994	United Nations Operation in Mozambique (ONUMOZ)	Mozambique	Mozambican Civil War	
1992–1993	United Nations Operation in Somalia I (UNOSOM I)	Somalia	Somali Civil War	
1993–1997	United Nations Observer Mission in Liberia (UNOMIL)	Liberia	First Liberian Civil War	
1993–1994	United Nations Observer Mission Uganda-Rwanda (UNOMUR)	Rwanda	Rwandan Civil War	
1993–1994	United Nations Observer Mission Uganda-Rwanda (UNOMUR)	Uganda	Rwandan Civil War	
1993–1996	United Nations Assistance Mission for Rwanda (UNAMIR)	Rwanda	Rwandan Civil War	
1993–1995	United Nations Operation in Somalia II (UNOSOM II)	Somalia	Somali Civil War	
1994	United Nations Aouzou Strip Observer Group (UNASOG)	Chad	Aouzou Strip dispute	
1994	United Nations Aouzou Strip Observer Group (UNASOG)	Libya	Aouzou Strip dispute	
1995–1997	United Nations Angola Verification Mission III (UNAVEM III)	Angola	Angolan Civil War	
1997–1999	United Nations Observer Mission in Angola (MONUA)	Angola	Angolan Civil War	
1998–1999	United Nations Observer Mission in Sierra Leone (UNOMSIL)	Sierra Leone	Sierra Leone Civil War	
1998–2000	United Nations Mission in the Central African Republic (MINURCA)	Central African Republic	Central African Republic mutinies	
1999–2005	United Nations Mission in Sierra Leone (UNAMSIL)	Sierra Leone	Sierra Leone Civil War	
2000–2008	United Nations Mission in Ethiopia and Eritrea (UNMEE)	Eritrea	Eritrean–Ethiopian War	
2000–2008	United Nations Mission in Ethiopia and Eritrea (UNMEE)	Ethiopia	Eritrean–Ethiopian War	
2004–2007	United Nations Operation in Burundi (ONUB)	Burundi	Burundi Civil War	
1999–2010	United Nations Organization Mission in the Democratic Republic of the Congo (MONUC)	Democratic Republic of the Congo	Second Congo War	
2007–2010	United Nations Mission in the Central African Republic and Chad (MINURCAT)	Chad; Central African Republic	Darfur Conflict, Civil war in Chad (2005–2010)	
2005–2011	United Nations Mission in the Sudan (UNMIS)	Sudan	Second Sudanese Civil War	
2003–2004	United Nations Mission in Côte d'Ivoire (MINUCI)	Ivory Coast	First Ivorian Civil War	
2004–2017	United Nations Operation in Côte d'Ivoire (UNOCI)	Ivory Coast	First Ivorian Civil War	
2003–2018	United Nations Mission in Liberia (UNMIL)	Liberia	Second Liberian Civil War	
2007–2020	United Nations/African Union Mission in Darfur (UNAMID)	Sudan (Darfur)	War in Darfur	
2013–2023	Multidimensional Integrated Stabilisation Mission in Mali (MINUSMA) (Note: MINUSMA's mandate was terminated by the United Nations Security Council on 30 June 2023; this is subject to a 6-month drawdown period until 31 December 2023, in order to facilitate an orderly withdrawal of UN personnel and equipment from Mali.)	Mali	Northern Mali conflict	

=== Americas ===
Dates of operation	Name of operation	Location	Conflict	Website
1965–1966	Mission of the Representative of the Secretary-General in the Dominican Republic (DOMREP)	Dominican Republic	Operation Power Pack	
1989–1992	United Nations Observer Group in Central America (ONUCA)	Costa Rica	Central American crisis Nicaraguan Civil War	
1989–1992	United Nations Observer Group in Central America (ONUCA)	El Salvador	Central American crisis Nicaraguan Civil War	
1989–1992	United Nations Observer Group in Central America (ONUCA)	Guatemala	Central American crisis Nicaraguan Civil War	
1989–1992	United Nations Observer Group in Central America (ONUCA)	Honduras	Central American crisis Nicaraguan Civil War	
1989–1992	United Nations Observer Group in Central America (ONUCA)	Nicaragua	Central American crisis Nicaraguan Civil War	
1991–1995	United Nations Observer Mission in El Salvador (ONUSAL)	El Salvador	El Salvador Civil War	
1993–1996	United Nations Mission in Haiti (UNMIH)	Haiti	1991 coup and military rule in Haiti	
1996–1997	United Nations Support Mission in Haiti (UNSMIH)	Haiti	Stabilizing Haiti's new democracy	
1997	United Nations Verification Mission in Guatemala (MINUGUA)	Guatemala	Guatemalan Civil War	
1997	United Nations Transition Mission in Haiti (UNTMIH)	Haiti	Training of the Haitian National Police	
1997–2000	United Nations Civilian Police Mission in Haiti (MIPONUH)	Haiti	Training of the Haitian National Police	
2000–2001	United Nations General Assembly International Civilian Support Mission in Haiti (MICAH)	Haiti	Training of the Haitian National Police	
2004–2017	United Nations Stabilisation Mission in Haiti (MINUSTAH)	Haiti	2004 Haitian coup d'état	
2017–2019	United Nations Mission for Justice Support in Haiti (MINUJUSTH)	Haiti	2004 Haitian coup d'état	

1. Shown are the flags of the five countries in which ONUCA operated. They are in this order (sorted alphabetically): Costa Rica, El Salvador, Guatemala, Honduras, and Nicaragua.

=== Asia-Oceania ===
Dates of operation	Name of operation	Location	Conflict	Website
1947–1950	United Nations Commission for Indonesia (UNCI)	Dutch East Indies	Transfer of sovereignty over Dutch East Indies	
1947–1950	United Nations Commission for Indonesia (UNCI)	Indonesia	Transfer of sovereignty over Dutch East Indies	
1962–1963	United Nations Security Force in West New Guinea (UNSF)	UN-administered West New Guinea	Transfer of sovereignty over Dutch New Guinea	
1965–1966	United Nations India-Pakistan Observation Mission (UNIPOM)	Pakistan	Indo-Pakistani War of 1965	
1965–1966	United Nations India-Pakistan Observation Mission (UNIPOM)	India	Indo-Pakistani War of 1965	
1988–1990	United Nations Good Offices Mission in Afghanistan and Pakistan (UNGOMAP)	Afghanistan	Soviet–Afghan War	
1988–1990	United Nations Good Offices Mission in Afghanistan and Pakistan (UNGOMAP)	Pakistan	Soviet–Afghan War	
1991–1992	United Nations Advance Mission in Cambodia (UNAMIC)	Cambodia	Conflict in Cambodia	
1992–1993	United Nations Transitional Authority in Cambodia (UNTAC)	Cambodia	Conflict in Cambodia	
1994–2000	United Nations Mission of Observers in Tajikistan (UNMOT)	Tajikistan	Tajikistan Civil War	
1999	United Nations Mission in East Timor (UNAMET)	Indonesia; Indonesian occupied East Timor	Indonesian invasion of East Timor	
1999–2002	The United Nations Transitional Administration in East Timor (UNTAET)	(United Nations) UN-administered East Timor	Indonesian invasion of East Timor	
2002–2005	United Nations Mission of Support in East Timor (UNMISET)	East Timor	Indonesian invasion of East Timor	
2006–2012	United Nations Integrated Mission in Timor-Leste (UNMIT)	East Timor	2006 East Timorese crisis	

=== Europe ===
Dates of operation	Name of operation	Location	Conflict	Website
1992–1995	United Nations Protection Force (UNPROFOR)	Bosnia and Herzegovina	Yugoslav Wars	
1992–1995	United Nations Protection Force (UNPROFOR)	Croatia	Yugoslav Wars	
1992–1995	United Nations Protection Force (UNPROFOR)	Republic of Macedonia	Yugoslav Wars	
1992–1995	United Nations Protection Force (UNPROFOR)	FR Yugoslavia	Yugoslav Wars	
1993–2009	United Nations Observer Mission in Georgia (UNOMIG)	Georgia	Abkhazian War	
1994–1996	United Nations Confidence Restoration Operation (UNCRO)	Croatia	Croatian War of Independence	
1995–2002	United Nations Mission in Bosnia and Herzegovina (UNMIBH)	Bosnia and Herzegovina	Bosnian War	
1995–1999	United Nations Preventive Deployment Force (UNPREDEP)	Republic of Macedonia	Aftermath of the Yugoslav wars	
1996–1998	United Nations Transitional Authority in Eastern Slavonia, Baranja and Western Sirmium (UNTAES)	Croatia (Eastern Slavonia)	Croatian War of Independence	
1996–2002	United Nations Mission of Observers in Prevlaka (UNMOP)	Croatia	Prevlaka territorial dispute	
1996–2002	United Nations Mission of Observers in Prevlaka (UNMOP)	FR Yugoslavia	Prevlaka territorial dispute	
1998	United Nations Civilian Police Support Group (UNPSG)	Croatia	Croatian War of Independence	

1. This mission operated within former Yugoslav successor states of Bosnia and Herzegovina, Croatia, the Republic of Macedonia, and the Federal Republic of Yugoslavia (Serbia and Montenegro). The flags are shown in this order.

2. Prevlaka Peninsula was claimed by both Croatia and the Federal Republic of Yugoslavia (Serbia and Montenegro) and the flags are shown in this order. Upon resolution, all parties accepted Croatia's claim to the territory.

=== West Asia ===
Dates of operation	Name of operation	Location	Conflict	Website
1956–1967	First United Nations Emergency Force (UNEF I)	Egypt	Suez Crisis	
1956–1967	First United Nations Emergency Force (UNEF I)	Israel	Suez Crisis	
1958	United Nations Observation Group in Lebanon (UNOGIL)	Lebanon	1958 Lebanon crisis	
1963–1964	United Nations Yemen Observation Mission (UNYOM)	North Yemen	Yemen Civil War	
1973–1979	Second United Nations Emergency Force (UNEF II)	Egypt	Yom Kippur War	
1973–1979	Second United Nations Emergency Force (UNEF II)	Israel	Yom Kippur War	
1988–1991	United Nations Iran-Iraq Military Observer Group (UNIIMOG)	Iran	Iran–Iraq War	
1988–1991	United Nations Iran-Iraq Military Observer Group (UNIIMOG)	Iraq	Iran–Iraq War	
1991–2003	United Nations Iraq-Kuwait Observation Mission (UNIKOM)	Iraq	Gulf War	
1991–2003	United Nations Iraq-Kuwait Observation Mission (UNIKOM)	Kuwait	Gulf War	
2012	United Nations Supervision Mission in Syria (UNSMIS)	Syria	Syrian civil war	

== See also ==
- List of non-UN peacekeeping missions
- Peacekeeping
- Timeline of UN peacekeeping missions
