= National Council (East Timor) =

Type
- Type: Unicameral

History
- Preceded by: East Timor Regional House of Representatives
- Succeeded by: National Parliament of Timor-Leste

Leadership
- Speaker: Sérgio Vieira de Mello (1999-2000); Mário Viegas Carrascalão (2000-2001)
- Seats: 15 (1999-2000); 33 (2000-2001)

Elections
- Voting system: Appointed

Meeting place
- Dili, East Timor

The National Council (Portuguese: Conselho Nacional, Tetun: Komite Nasional) was a deliberative body that existed in East Timor between July 1999 and August 2001 during the period that the country was administered by the United Nations following the end of the Indonesian occupation. The council was replaced by a Constituent Assembly after elections held in August 2001.

== National Consultative Council ==
A National Consultative Council (Portuguese: Conselho Consultivo Nacional, Tetun: Komite Conselleiru Nasional) was established in December 1999 by UNTAET REG 1999/2, and served as a forum for East Timorese political and community leaders to advise the Transitional Administrator and discuss policy issues.

The National Consultative Council had fifteen members of which eleven were Timorese members and four international members. Of the eleven Timorese members, seven represented the National Council of Timorese Resistance, three represented political groups outside the CNRT, and one represented the Roman Catholic Church in East Timor.

=== Members ===
The members of the National Consultative Council were as follows:

1. Sérgio Vieira de Mello (UNTAET)
2. Xanana Gusmão (CNRT)
3. Alexandre Magno Ximenes (UDC/CNRT)
4. Maria Angela Freitas (Partido Trabalhista/CNRT)
5. Cipriana da Costa Pereira (FRETILIN/CNRT)
6. Salvador Ximenes Soares (BRTT)
7. José Estevão Soares (Pro-Integration)
8. Padre José António da Costa (Roman Catholic Church)
9. Avelino Coelho da Silva (PST/CNRT)
10. Laurentino Domingos Luis de Gusmão (APODETI)
11. Maria Lacruna (UDT/CNRT)
12. Clementino dos Reis Amaral (KOTA/CNRT)
13. Aliança Araújo (PNT)
14. Ágio Pereira (PSD/CNRT)
15. Maria Genoveva da Costa Martins

== National Council ==
In July 2000 the council dropped the word "consultative" from its name and became a legislature style body with the right to hold debates and to propose laws to UNTAET.

The National Council had 33 members all of whom were now Timorese. Seat distribution was as follows; seven represented the National Council of Timorese Resistance, three represented political groups outside the CNRT, and one representative each represented the Roman Catholic Church, Protestant denominations, the Muslim community, women's groups, student/youth groups, NGOs, professional organisations, business community, farming community, labour organisations, and one representative was appointed from each of East Timor's thirteen districts. Mário Viegas Carrascalão was elected speaker of the council.

=== Members ===
Incomplete list of members:

- Clementino dos Reis Amaral (KOTA/CNRT)
- Anselmo da Costa Aparicio (UDC/CNRT)
- Aliança Araújo (PNT)
- Manuel Carrascalão (businesses)
- José António da Costa (Catholic Church)
- José Estevão Soares (pro-integrationist)
- Maria Odete Faria (Dili District)
- Angela Freitas (Partido Trabalhista/CNRT)
- Maria de Fátima Wadhoomall Gomes (Protestant)
- Laurentino Domingos Luis de Gusmão (APODETI)
- Xanana Gusmão (CNRT), replaced on 2 April 2001 by José Ramos-Horta
- Eusébio Guterres (workers)
- Aniceto Guterres Lopes (non-governmental organization Yayasan Hak)
- Maria Lacruna (UDT)
- Jesuinha de Oliveira (Liquiçá District)
- Ágio Pereira (PSD/CNRT)
- Cipriana da Costa Pereira (FRETILIN)
- Milena Pires (women's organisations)
- Gregório Saldanha (Youth/Students)
- Albino da Silva (Lautém district)
- Avelino Coelho da Silva (PST/CNRT)
- Salvador Ximenes Soares (BRTT)
- Maria Terezinha Viegas (peasantry)
- Imam Muslim (Muslim community)

== See also ==
- United Nations Administered East Timor
- United Nations Transitional Administration in East Timor
- New Guinea Council, similar body that existed in United Nations Administered West New Guinea between 1962 and 1963
- Kosovo Transitional Council, similar body that existed in United Nations Administered Kosovo between 1999 and 2001
