= Kosovo Transitional Council =

Former UN advisory body of Kosovo

Type
- Type: Unicameral

Leadership
- Chair: Bernard Kouchner (1999-2001); Hans Hækkerup (2001)
- Seats: 12 (1999-2000); 36 (2000-2001)

Elections
- Voting system: Appointed

Meeting place
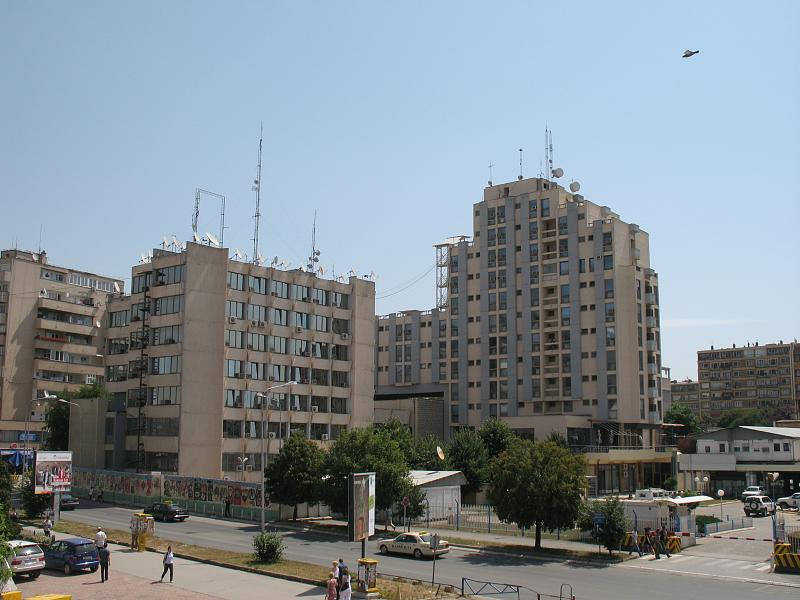
- UNMIK Headquarters, Pristina, Kosovo

Website
- https://web.archive.org/web/20071222235825/http://www.unmikonline.org/1styear/ktc.htm

The Kosovo Transitional Council, (Albanian: Këshilli Tranzitor i Kosovës, Serbian: Прелазни савет Косово, Prelazni savet Kosovo), was an advisory body that existed in Kosovo between July 1999 and November 2001 during the period that the United Nations was directly responsible for the governance of Kosovo. The council was replaced by the Assembly of Kosovo following elections held in November 2001.

== First transitional council (July 1999 to January 2000) ==
A twelve member transitional council was formed on 16 July 1999. Chaired by the Special Representative of the Secretary-General, the council was the described as being the highest political consultative body within the United Nations administration. Its purpose was to offer the main political parties and ethnic communities in Kosovo an opportunity for direct input into the decision-making process of UNMIK. The first meeting of the council was at the former MUP headquarters in Pristina and subsequent meetings were held at UNMIK headquarters.

=== Membership ===
The membership of the first transitional council was as follows:

Name	Role
Bernard Kouchner	Special Representative of the Secretary-General for Kosovo; Ex-officio chairman of the council
Ibrahim Rugova	Representative of the Democratic League of Kosovo (Albanian)
Vacant	Representative of the Democratic League of Kosovo (Albanian)
Hashim Thaçi	Representative of the Kosovo Liberation Army (Albanian)
Xhavit Haliti	Representative of the Kosovo Liberation Army (Albanian)
Rexhep Qosja	Representative of the United Democratic Movement (Albanian)
Mehmet Hajrizi	Representative of the United Democratic Movement (Albanian)
Veton Surroi	Independent representative of the Albanian community
Blerim Shala	Independent representative of the Albanian community
Bishop Artemije	Representative of the Serbian Orthodox Church (Serb)
Momcilo Trajkovic	Representative of the Serbian Resistance Movement (Serb)
Numan Balic	Representative of the Party of Democratic Action (Bosniak)
Sezair Shaipi	Representative of Turkish People's Party (Turk)
Mike Jackson; Klaus Reinhardt	Commander of the Kosovo Force; Observer

== Second transitional council (January 2000 to November 2001) ==
In January 2000, Joint Interim Administrative Structure was established. The membership of the transitional council was expanded to 35 and it assumed the role of a deliberative assembly. A transitional cabinet, known as the Interim Administrative Council, with eight members, four of which were appointed by UNMIK and four by political parties represented in the transitional council was also established at this time. Sessions of the council were chaired by the SRSG or one of their deputies.

=== Structure ===
The council had 36 members and would meet on a bi-weekly basis. It had four committees, each made up of 15 members; Tolerance and Protection of Local Communities, Detainees and Missing Persons, Economic Affairs and Education.

=== Membership ===
The membership of the second transitional council was as follows:

Members of the Interim Administrative Council

- Hashim Thaçi - Democratic Party of Kosovo
- Ibrahim Rugova - Democratic League of Kosovo
- Rexhep Qosja - United Democratic Movement
- Rada Trajković - Serbian National Council of Kosovo and Metohija

Representatives of ethnic Albanian political parties

- Kolë Berisha - Democratic League of Kosovo
- Gjergj Dedaj - Liberal Party of Kosovo
- Feti Grapci - Republican Party of Kosovo
- Fatmir Limaj - Democratic Party of Kosovo
- Vacant - National Movement for Liberation of Kosovo
- Januz Salihaj - Parliamentary Party of Kosovo
- Mehmet Hajrizi - United Democratic Movement
- Nazmi Halimi - Albanian Christian Democratic Party of Kosovo
- Lazer Krasniqi - Albanian Christian Democratic Party of Kosovo
- Kaqusha Jashari - Social Democratic Party of Kosovo
- Luleta Pula-Beriqi - Social Democratic Party of Kosovo

Representatives of ethnic minority communities

- Randjel Nojkic - SNC Serbian National Council of Kosovo and Metohija (Serb)
- Dragan Velic - SNC Serbian National Council of Kosovo and Metohija (Serb)
- Vacant - Serbian National Council - Mitrovica (Serb)
- Numan Balic - Party of Democratic Action (Kosovo) (Bosniac)
- Asim Puljic - Zaman NGO (Bosniac)
- Sezair Shaipi - Turkish People's Party (Turk)
- Vacant - Additional Turkish representative (Turk)
- Hadji Zulfi Mergja - Roma community leader (Roma)

Representatives of religious communities

- Rexhep Boja - Muslim community
- Bishop Mark Sopi - Roman Catholic Church
- Father Sava Janjic - Serbian Orthodox Church

Representatives of civil society

- Shukrie Rexha - Association of Political Prisoners
- Iak Mita - Mother Teresa Society
- Hajrullahu Gorani - Association of Trade Unions
- Pajazit Nushi - Council for the Defence of Human Rights and Freedoms
- Sevdije Ahmeti - Centre for the Protection of Women and Children
- Blerim Shala - Zeri newspaper (representing publishers)
- Sonja Nikolic - Civic House/Radio Contact
- Feriz Krasniqi - Former Rector of Pristina University
- Ylber Hysa - Kosova Action for Civic Initiatives
- Ismail Kastrati - Kosovo Chamber of Commerce and Industry

== See also ==
- United Nations Administered Kosovo
- United Nations Interim Administration Mission in Kosovo
- Joint Interim Administrative Structure
- Provisional Institutions of Self-Government
- New Guinea Council, similar body that existed in United Nations Administered West New Guinea between 1962 and 1963
- National Council (East Timor), similar body that existed in United Nations Administered East Timor between 1999 and 2001
