= UN Mandate =

UN institution

The term UN mandate is typically used to refer to a long-term international mission which has been authorised by the United Nations General Assembly or the UN Security Council in particular. UN mandates typically involve peacekeeping operations.

Mandates in the past included Darfur, Eritrea, and Libya.

== See also ==
- List of United Nations peacekeeping missions
- Timeline of United Nations peacekeeping missions
- United Nations Department of Political and Peacebuilding Affairs
