= Timorese Popular Democratic Association =

Pro-Indonesian political party in East Timor (1974–2001)

Timorese Popular Democratic Association Associação Popular Democrática Timorense Asosiasi Demokratik Rakyat Timor
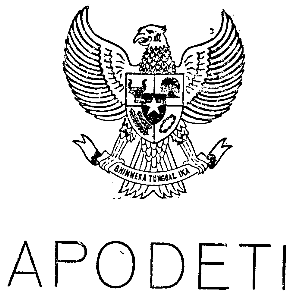
- Abbreviation: APODETI
- Founded: 27 May 1974
- Dissolved: 2007
- Ideology: Conservatism; Autonomism; Indonesian integration (until 2000)
- Political position: Right-wing

Party flag

The Timorese Popular Democratic Association (Portuguese: Associação Popular Democrática Timorense, APODETI; Indonesian: Asosiasi Demokratik Rakyat Timor) was a political party in East Timor established in 1974, which advocated for integration into Indonesia. Along with another East Timor party, the Timorese Democratic Union (UDT), it signed the Balibo Declaration in 1975 calling for Indonesia to annex the region. The party led the Provisional Government of East Timor that was formed following the Indonesian invasion of East Timor later that year. Since 2000, the party used the suffix Pro-Referendo (Pro-referendum). A renaming to Partido Democrata Liberal was considered. The party is said to have been dissolved.

== History ==
East Timor was a Portuguese colony for several hundred years. When the Carnation Revolution toppled the Lisbon regime in 1974, East Timor entered a period of instability. One of the first changes was the legalization of political parties. Along with the Timorese Democratic Union and Fretilin, APODETI was founded quickly after the announcement. Party leaders believed East Timor would not have been a viable independent state.

On 27 May 1974, a group of thirty individuals met to create a party to advocate for integration into Indonesia. The party's first name was the Associação para a Integração de Timor na Indonésia (lit. 'Association for the Integration of Timor into Indonesia', AITI), but organizers decided the pro-integration position was unpopular and decided to remove the word from their name. Among them were several former participants in the Viqueque Rebellion (1959).

In its original manifesto, the party called for "autonomous integration" into Indonesia while also declaring support for human rights and freedom of expression. The party also advocated the teaching of Indonesian in East Timor's schools. The party supported religious freedom and opposed racism, but initially opposed the Catholic Church and took anti-white positions. APODETI only found support from a few Liurai in the border region. Some of them had collaborated with the Japanese against the Portuguese colonial rulers during World War II. A large part of the small Muslim minority in East Timor also supported the APODETI.

APODETI used to be seen as a front organization funded by Jakarta. Its prominent leaders have had close contact with Indonesian secret agents since the 1960s. For support and funding from Indonesia, they used their position in society as traders, customs officials, and influential traditional leaders. APODETI's first president was Arnaldo dos Reis Araújo, a 60-year-old cattle farmer who had collaborated with the Japanese invasion forces during World War II. Araujo spent several months in Jakarta during 1974, where he met government officials who quickly found ways to support his organization. Later, he became the first governor of East Timor under Indonesian rule. The first vice-president of the party was Hermenegildo Martins, owner of a coffee plantation. Another key APODETI leader was a former schoolteacher named José Abílio Osório Soares. Echoing the sentiment that East Timor could not survive as an independent state, he professed a strong faith in Indonesia's willingness to help. In 1975 he said: "We do not need neocolonialism, just some control from Indonesia; and if we need some things maybe we can get them from Indonesia."

The popularity of APODETI was low compared to the pro-independence Fretilin and even the more moderate UDT. Still, it received considerable support from the Indonesian government, in the form of financial donations and declarations of solidarity. When APODETI leaders announced that 70 percent of the population endorsed integration, Indonesian officials repeated the claim and it became a staple of media reports in Jakarta. Their strongest supporter was Dom Guilherme Gonçalves, the Liurai of the former Atsabe Kingdom from Atsabe/Ermera Municipality and head of the Atsabe Kemak. He had strong family ties within the former kingdom and its old allies. This included ties to Kemak in what are now the municipalities of Ainaro and Bobonaro and northern and southern Tetum and Bunak on both sides of the borders. He was extremely anti-Portuguese and had a large traditional army. Gonçalves came from a long line of kings who regularly rebelled against the Portuguese. He hated the artificial colonial border that divided his family and separated the east from the Laran spiritual center in Wehale. That is why he wanted a reunification of Timor. At the same time, party leaders were ridiculed in East Timor, and some traveled accompanied by bodyguards. This, in turn, led to more belligerent statements by APODETI leaders.

APODETI was the first East Timorese party to establish paramilitary forces. In August 1974, it began training camps in Indonesian West Timor. Instructors and weapons came from the Indonesian military. Tomás Gonçalves, son of the Liurais of Atsabe, Guilherme Gonçalves and APODETI representative in West Timor, met the commander of the armed forces General Maraden Panggabean in Jakarta the following month. APODETI presented itself as a suitable vehicle for the integration of East Timor into Indonesia.

When FRETILIN proclaimed East Timor's independence from Portugal on November 28, 1975, Indonesia reacted by reporting that Dom Guilherme Gonçalves and Alexandrino Borromeo of APODETI and other opposition politicians had signed the so-called Balibo Declaration, which called for East Timor's annexation to Indonesia. The declaration was drafted by Indonesian intelligence and signed in Bali, not Balibo. After Indonesia's invasion, a puppet government was established in mid-December 1976, consisting of APODETI and UDT leaders. Arnaldo dos Reis Araújo became the first governor of Timor Timur, as East Timor was called under Indonesian rule. He was followed by Dom Guilherme Gonçalves and, after an interlude by UDT member Mário Viegas Carrascalão, finally the last was José Abílio Osório Soares, brother of José Fernando Osório Soares and former mayor of Dili.

After East Timor's independence, the party stressed that its goal had been to ensure East Timor's viability as an autonomous province of Indonesia and that APODETI was opposed to annexation by force. In a public statement at the CNRT Congress in August 2000, APODETI accepted the result of the 1999 East Timorese independence referendum, which had been in favor of independence, and added the appendix Pro-Referendum to its name. APODETI became a member of the CNRT and participated in the National Council. During the transition to independence, the party participated in the 2001 East Timorese parliamentary election where it received 2,181 votes (0.6%) and failed to gain a seat in the Constituent Assembly. The party did not contest the 2007 East Timorese parliamentary election. While some claimed the party no longer exists, on 27 May 2023, APODETI party administrators and members organized an event in South Jakarta to celebrate the 49-year anniversary of the founding of APODETI. They insisted that the party still exists and fight for East Timor integration with Indonesia, which needs to be adapted to the circumstances of the times, that is, through referendum and not armed struggle.

== Politics in independent East Timor ==
APODETI supported national unity, the independence and sovereignty of East Timor, non-violence, and the defense of democracy, tolerance, and the socio-cultural values of the East Timorese people. The party stood behind the multiparty system, democracy, and human rights for men and women. APODETI advocated a free market economy, foreign and domestic investment, and a free education system. It supported the introduction of Portuguese as a provisional official language and the further development of Tetum. English was to be taught at all school levels, as were civics and morals for the young. As far as possible, the health care system was to be free. In foreign policy, close relations with neighboring Australia and Indonesia, as well as with Portuguese-speaking countries, were supported. Other goals were the creation of jobs, the advancement of the people and the support of war victims, such as widows, orphans, the elderly and those who were disadvantaged by their political work during the Indonesian occupation.

== Leaders ==
The last party president was Frederico Almeida Santos da Costa, born in Lospalos and one of the founders of the party. He used to work in the Portuguese colonial administration and in customs during the Indonesian occupation. Today he is retired.

Laurentino Domingos Luis de Gusmão was the vice president of APODETI and a member of the National Council (NC). During the colonial period, he was in charge of financial administration in Baucau Municipality. Under the Indonesian occupation, Gusmão held senior positions in the civil service, including Chief of Cabinet. During the UN administration, he was appointed to the National Consultative Council (NCC). Today, he is retired.

Party Secretary João Baptista dos Santos was born in Lospalos in 1951. After serving as a Portuguese civil servant, dos Santos worked in various government offices during Indonesia's rule and was deputy regent (wakil bupati) in Lospalos. In 2001, Santos taught history and Portuguese in Dili.

Other founding members were Abel da Costa Belo, Pinto Soares, and Casimero dos Reis Araújo, son of Arnaldo. José Martins switched to the Klibur Oan Timor Asuwain (KOTA) party.

== Election results ==
Year	Election	Popular- vote	Seats
2001	2001 East Timorese parliamentary election	2,181 (0.60%)	0 / 88

== Party symbols ==
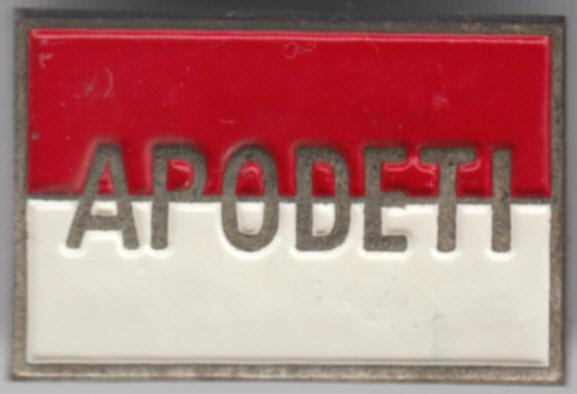
APODETI flag in 1974

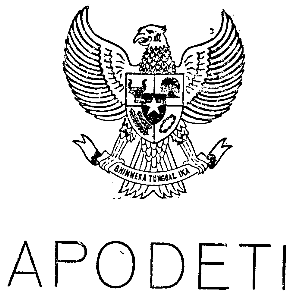
APODETI logo in 1974

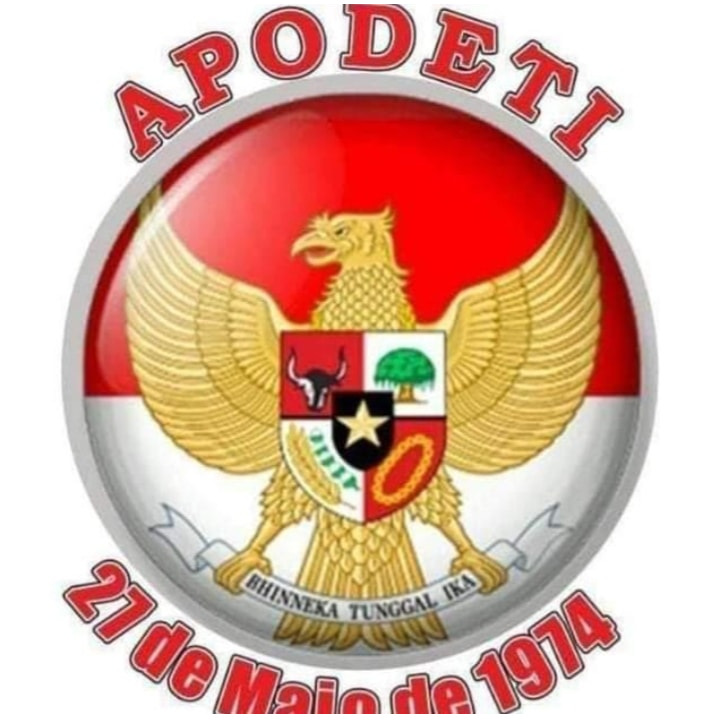
Logo used by APODETI supporters in 2021

== Bibliography ==
- Budiardjo, Carmel and Liem Soei Liong. The War against East Timor. London: Zed Books Ltd, 1984. ISBN 0-86232-228-6.
- Dunn, James. Timor: A People Betrayed. Sydney: Australian Broadcasting Corporation, 1996. ISBN 0-7333-0537-7.
- Taylor, John G. Indonesia's Forgotten War: The Hidden History of East Timor. London: Zed Books Ltd, 1991. ISBN 1-85649-014-9.
