= Shahidul Haque (general) =

Bangladeshi military personnel and diplomat

- শহীদুল হক

Ambassador of Bangladesh to Libya
- In office August 2014 – December 2016
- Succeeded by: Sheikh Sekander Ali

Military service
- Allegiance: Bangladesh
- Branch/service: Bangladesh Army
- Rank: Major General

Shahidul Haque is a retired military officer of Bangladesh Army and a former ambassador of Bangladesh to Libya during 2014–2016. He is a former defence attaché at the Bangladesh embassy in Myanmar.

== Career ==
Shahidul Haque participated in UN peacekeeping missions in Ivory Coast, Cambodia and Rwanda.
