= United Nations Temporary Executive Authority =

Administrative and peacekeeping mission (1962–1963)

- Abbreviation: UNTEA
- Formation: 1 October 1962
- Type: Subsidiary organ of the UN General Assembly
- Legal status: Completed on 1 May 1963
- Headquarters: Hollandia, West New Guinea
- Head: José Rolz-Bennett (1962); Jalal Abdoh (1962–1963)
- Parent organization: United Nations General Assembly
- Website: https://peacekeeping.un.org/sites/default/files/past/unsf.htm

The United Nations Temporary Executive Authority (UNTEA), (Indonesian: Otoritas Eksekutif Sementara Perserikatan Bangsa-Bangsa), was established on 1 October 1962 in accord with Article two of the New York Agreement to administer the former Dutch colony of West New Guinea until it was handed over to Indonesia on 1 May 1963.

This was the first time in its history that the United Nations assumed direct administrative responsibility for a territory, as opposed to monitoring or supervising. The United Nations would go on to undertake similar missions in Cambodia (UNTAC), Croatia (UNTAES), Kosovo (UNMIK) and East Timor (UNTAET).

== United Nations Security Force ==
In addition to civil administration, the United Nations also had a peacekeeping role through the United Nations Security Force in West New Guinea (UNSF). The maximum force strength was 1,500 infantry and 76 aircraft personnel. Pakistan, Canada and United States contributed personnel with Pakistan providing 1,500 troops and the United States and Canada contributing 60 and 16 air force personnel respectively. The Force Commander for the UNSF was Said Uddin Khan of Pakistan.

== Head of mission ==
UNTEA was led by Special Representative of the Secretary General José Rolz-Bennett of Guatemala from 1 October 1962 to 15 November, and then by Jalal Abdoh of the Imperial State of Iran who served from 15 November 1962 to 1 May 1963.

No.	Portrait	Name (Birth–Death)	Term of office		
No.	Portrait	Name (Birth–Death)	Took office	Left office	Time in office
-		José Rolz-Bennett (acting)	1 October 1962	15 November 1962	45 days
1		Jalal Abdoh	15 November 1962	1 May 1963	167 days

== See also ==
- United Nations Administered West New Guinea
