= I UNTAET Transitional Government of East Timor =

UN / East Timorese cabinet led by Sérgio Vieira de Mello

I UNTAET Transitional Government
- I UNTAET Transitional Government of East Timor

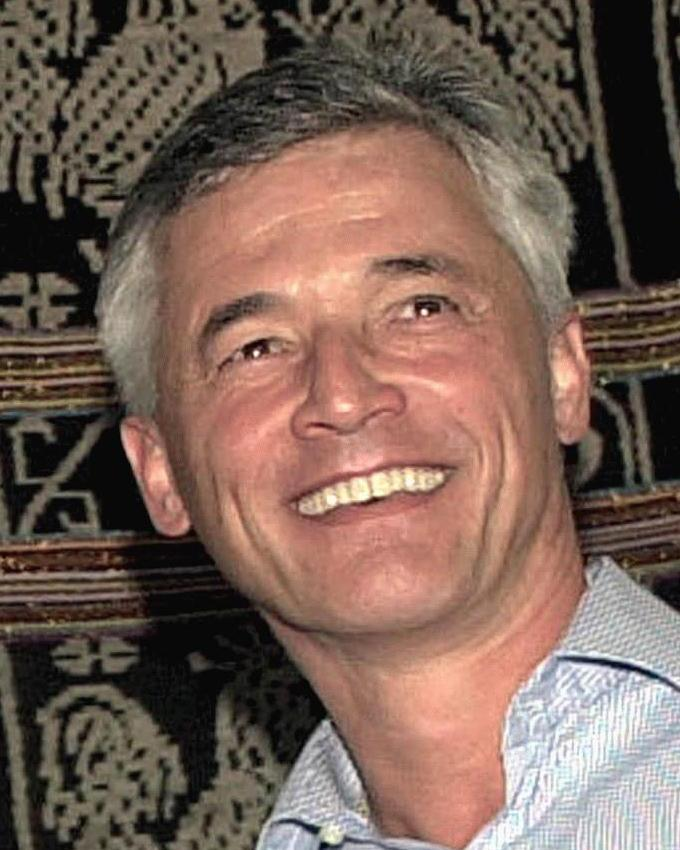
- Administrator Sérgio Vieira de Mello
- Date formed: 15 July 2000
- Date dissolved: 20 September 2001

People and organisations
- Transitional Administrator: Sérgio Vieira de Mello

History
- Successor: II UNTAET Transitional Government

The I UNTAET Transitional Government (Portuguese: I Governo Transitório UNTAET, Tetum: I Governu Tranzisaun UNTAET) was the first administration or cabinet of United Nations Administered East Timor, a United Nations protectorate that provided an interim civil administration and a peacekeeping mission in the territory of East Timor from 25 October 1999 until 20 May 2002.

The Transitional Government took office on 15 July 2000 and was headed by the UN Transitional Administrator, Sérgio Vieira de Mello. It was replaced on 20 September 2001 by the II UNTAET Transitional Government.

== Composition ==
The government was made up of the UN Transitional Administrator and Ministers, as follows:

Party	Minister	Portrait	Portfolio
United Nations	Sérgio Vieira de Mello		Transitional Administrator
United Nations	Peter Galbraith		Minister for Political Affairs and Timor Sea
United Nations	Jean-Christian Cady		Minister for Police and Emergency Services
United Nations	Michael Francino		Minister for Finance
United Nations	Gita Honwana-Welch		Minister for Justice
Independent	José Ramos-Horta		Minister for Foreign Affairs (to 31 March 2001 and from 15 July 2001)
Fretilin	Mari Alkatiri		Minister for Economic Affairs
Fretilin	Ana Pessoa Pinto		Minister for Internal Administration (to 15 July 2001)
UDT	João Viegas Carrascalão		Minister for Infrastructure (to 16 July 2001)
Catholic Church	Filomeno Jacob Abel		Minister for Social Affairs
PD	Florindo Pereira		Minister for Internal Administration (from 15 July 2001)
Fretilin	Ovídio de Jesus Amaral		Minister for Infrastructure (from 16 July 2001)
