= Joint Interim Administrative Structure =

- Logo

Overview
- Established: 30 January 2000 - 4 March 2002
- Polity: Kosovo
- Website: Archived website

The Joint Interim Administrative Structure (JIAS) was an interim administrative body in Kosovo, established in January 2000 by the United Nations Interim Administration Mission in Kosovo (UNMIK) during the period that the United Nations was directly responsible for the governance of Kosovo. The JIAS was replaced by Provisional Institutions of Self-Government (PISG) in March 2002 following Kosovo wide elections to the new institutions.

== Structure ==
The JIAS was divided into the following branches:

- Kosovo Transitional Council — a 35-member "legislature style" advisory body to represent the views of Kosovo stakeholder groups. These groups included political parties, religious organizations, national minorities and groups representing civil society. The council had powers of scrutiny over the Kosovo administrative departments.
- Interim Administrative Council — a "cabinet-style" body to advise the SRSG on policies relating to the other JIAS bodies. It was composed of 8 members, 4 nominated by the United Nations, 3 representatives of Kosovo Albanians and 1 representative of Kosovo Serbs and two additional observer members. The Kosovo Albanian representatives were Ibrahim Rugova, Hashim Thaci and Rexhep Qosja. The Serb member, Rada Trajković, represented the Serbian National Council for Kosovo and Metohija and only participated as an observer. The SRSG served as the non-voting chairman.
- Administrative departments — 19 administrative departments were established during 2000 and each was co-headed by an Unmik co-head and a Kosovo co-head. These departments continued following the transition to the PISG.
- Central Fiscal Authority — was responsible for managing the Kosovo Consolidated Budget which consisted of the budgets of the administrative departments and municipalities.
- Municipal Administrative Boards — the municipalities of Kosovo were administered by Municipal Administrative Boards headed by UNMIK Municipal Administrators.

== See also ==
- United Nations Administered Kosovo
- Provisional Institutions of Self-Government
- United Nations Security Council Resolution 1244
