= List of territories administered by the United Nations =

Overview of UN-administered areas

The flag of the United Nations, used for all administrations (except Cambodia).

The flag used in United Nations–administered Cambodia.

This is a list of territories which are directly administered, or once were, by the United Nations (UN). These are not to be confused with United Nations trust territories, which were run by a single country under a UN mandate.

== List ==
=== Current ===
Name	Location	Years	State
United Nations Peacekeeping Force in Cyprus (UNFICYP)	United Nations Buffer Zone in Cyprus (UNBZC)	1964–present	Cyprus
United Nations Disengagement Observer Force (UNDOF)	UNDOF Zone	1974–present	Syria (partially controlled by Israel)
United Nations Interim Administration Mission in Kosovo (UNMIK)	Kosovo	1999–present (only de jure since 2008)	Kosovo (claimed by Serbia)

=== Authorised by a United Nations mandate ===
Name	Location	Years	State
Board of Peace (BoP); National Committee for the Administration of Gaza (NCAG)	Gaza Strip	2026–present	Palestine (partially controlled by Israel)

=== Former ===
Name	Location	Years	Today part of
United Nations Temporary Executive Authority (UNTEA)	West New Guinea	1962–1963	Indonesia
United Nations Transitional Authority in Cambodia (UNTAC)	Cambodia	1992–1993	Cambodia
United Nations Transitional Administration for Eastern Slavonia, Baranja and Western Sirmium (UNTAES)	Eastern Slavonia, Baranja and Western Syrmia	1996–1998	Croatia
United Nations Transitional Administration in East Timor (UNTAET)	East Timor	1999–2002	Timor-Leste

=== Proposed ===
- Corpus separatum (Jerusalem) – 1947 UN internationalization proposal

== See also ==
- Allied administration of Libya
- Extraterritoriality
  - Extraterritorial jurisdiction
  - Extraterritorial operation
- Free City of Danzig
- Free Territory of Trieste
- International city
- International waters
- International zone
- Klaipėda Region (Memel Territory)
- League of Nations mandate
- Outer Space Treaty
- Territory of the Saar Basin
- United Nations Interim Force in Lebanon
- United Nations list of non-self-governing territories
- United Nations Transition Assistance Group
- United Nations trust territories
