= FCU UNTAC =

FCU – UNTAC, the Force Communications Unit UNTAC (United Nations Transitional Authority in Cambodia), was the Australian component of the UNTAC mission in Cambodia.

== United Nations Transitional Authority in Cambodia ==
After Vietnam intervened in Cambodia in 1979 to overthrow the Khmer Rouge regime, Cambodia became embroiled in a four-sided civil war.

Pteah Kangaroo – HQ of Australian Contingent- UNTAC

The four groups were the Vietnamese-installed government of the State of Cambodia (SOC) which was supported by the Cambodian People's Armed Forces (CPAF); the communist Democratic Kampuchea (DK – commonly known as the Khmer Rouge) which is supported by the National Army of Democratic Kampuchea (NADK); and the two non communist factions, the Khmer People's National Liberation Front (KPNLF) which was supported by Khmer People's National Liberation Armed Forces (KPNLAF); and the United Front for an Independent, Neutral, Peaceful and Cooperative Cambodia (FUNCINPEC) which was supported by the National Army of Independent Cambodia (ANKI).

In August 1989, the UN proposed an observer mission to monitor the withdrawal of Vietnamese forces from Cambodia and supervise an internal peace process between the four factions. From 6–22 August 1989, two Australian officers were deployed to Thailand and Cambodia on the UN reconnaissance team planning the mission.

In late March 1992, UNTAC was established under the 1991 Paris Agreements to supervise a cease-fire and general election in Cambodia. Australian diplomacy during 1989–1991 assisted the successful conclusion of the Agreements.

== United Nations Advance Mission in Cambodia ==
In October 1991, prior to UNTAC being formally established in United Nations Security Council Resolution 717. On 10 November 1991 45 Australian Army personnel flew to Cambodia as part of Australia's advance party to UNAMIC. The advance party established an Australian HQ and provided basic radio communications to the 4 military factions headquarters. Australia contributed a 65-strong communications unit to its precursor, the UN Advance Mission in Cambodia (UNAMIC). The Australians (under the command of Lieutenant Colonel Russell Stuart) were among the first UN troops in Cambodia to provide communications support to UNAMIC, which was tasked to set in motion the peace process and pave the way for the deployment of UNTAC. UNAMIC's mandate ended in March 1992 and was absorbed into UNTAC at its establishment in United Nations Security Council Resolution 745.

== United Nations Transitional Authority in Cambodia ==
On UNTAC's establishment, the Australian Defence Force contingent increased to 502 personnel, comprising the 488 strong Force Communications Unit (FCU) and 14 staff on HQ UNTAC spread out across 60 locations throughout Cambodia. The FCU was originally based on the 2nd Signal Regiment (based in Watsonia, Melbourne), but reinforced from many other units, including 20 personnel each from the RAN and the RAAF. The FCU also included a further 40 New Zealand personnel. UNTAC's military component comprised some 16,000 personnel from 32 countries. The Force Commander of this operation was Australia's Lieutenant General J.M. Sanderson AC.

Front Gate – Pteah Australii

Since 1991 when the original Australian UNAMIC contingent provided the communications network between the four Cambodian factions' military headquarters and the UNAMIC headquarters, the task of the Australians mushroomed under its UNTAC mandate. To achieve those tasks, the FCU based its RHQ in Phnom Penh (Pteah Kangaroo), along with the headquarters of its administrative squadron and 1 Sig Sqn (Pteah Australii). 2 Sig Sqn was based in the northern provincial capital of Battambang. The FCU was spread across 56 locations throughout Cambodia and was the only unit to serve in Cambodia to see more action than any other UN unit. Other major FCU locations included Siem Reap, Kampong Som, Banteay Meanchey, Khu, Kampong Cham, Kampong Thom, Pailin, Sisophon and Kampong Chhnang.

Simon Woolley's Medals – UNTAC medals – far left and far right

From 11 May to 9 September 1992, a Movement Control Group (MCG) comprising seven RAN, 16 Army and seven RAAF personnel joined UNTAC. The MCG included a headquarters and nine three-person teams, and coordinated the reception and movement of forces during UNTAC's main deployment phase. From 15 May to 19 July 1993, Australia contributed a further 115 troops and six S70A Blackhawk helicopters, with the deployment of a squadron from the 5th Aviation Regiment and an infantry platoon protection party from the 2nd/4th Battalion, Royal Australian Regiment.

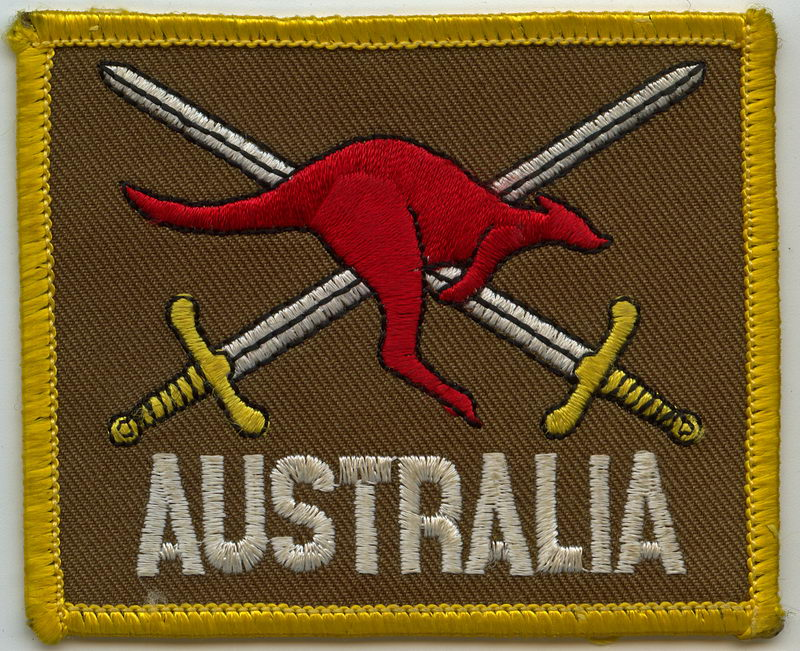
Australian Army Patch – UNTAC

As part of the staged withdrawal in circa September 1993 of the FCU, a transit camp was built and guarded by a small group of Arms Corp volunteers named security platoon. They feature at least twice in the Force Commanders log that has been recently declassified. Providing security at the airport and by heilo racing to rescue a detachment from gunpoint extortion. The Commanders log ended some two months before these armed troops left, so many incidents are lost to history. They are the 'forgotten few' that Public Relations Cpl Alan Green (ex Infantry) discusses on 11 November 1993. This small group departed on 19 November and are believed last FCU troops out.

== Post UNTAC ==
After the elections, UNTAC was closed on 15 November 1993 and replaced by the United Nations Military Liaison Team (UNMLT). UNMLT comprises 20 military observers and their task is to maintain close liaison with the Cambodian Government and report to the Secretary-General on matters affecting security in Cambodia and also assisting the Government in dealing with residual military matters related to the Paris Agreement. UNMLT was established for a single period of six months. Military observers are eligible to receive the UNTAC medal.

In 2014, the Force Communications Unit was awarded a Meritorious Unit Citation in the Australia Day honours list. The MUC was awarded to the unit on the 22 September 2014, however, the New Zealand members of the unit received their awards in August 2015 approximately 11 months after their Australian counterparts.
