= United Nations–administered West New Guinea =

UN-administered territory from 1962 to 1963

West New Guinea West-Nieuw-Guinea (Dutch) Irian Barat (Indonesian)
- 1962–1963
- Flag Emblem

- Location of West New Guinea in Oceania
- Status: United Nations administered territory
- Capital: Hollandia
- Common languages: Dutch; English; Papuan languages Austronesian languages
- Administrator
  - 1962: José Rolz-Bennett (acting)
  - 1962–1963: Jalal Abdoh
- Legislature: New Guinea Council
- Historical era: Cold War
  - Established: 1 October 1962
  - Disestablished: 30 April 1963
- Currency: Dutch New Guinean gulden
Preceded by	Succeeded by
Dutch New Guinea	Western New Guinea
- Today part of: Indonesia

Between 1 October 1962 and 30 April 1963 Western New Guinea was administered by the United Nations Temporary Executive Authority (UNTEA) in accordance with article two of the New York Agreement reached between the governments of the Netherlands and Indonesia in August 1962.

This was the first time in its history that the United Nations assumed direct administrative responsibility for a territory (as opposed to monitoring or supervising). The UN was responsible for promoting and safeguarding human rights at the national level. The United Nations would go on to undertake similar missions in Cambodia (UNTAC), the Eastern Slavonia region of Croatia (UNTAES), Kosovo (UNMIK) and East Timor (UNTAET).

== History ==
Western New Guinea became the focus of a political dispute between the Netherlands and Indonesia following the recognition of the independence of the latter. The Indonesian side claimed the territory as its own while the Dutch side maintained that its residents were not Indonesian and that the Netherlands would continue to administer the territory as Dutch New Guinea until it was capable of self-determination.

In May 1959 a United States diplomat proposed a scheme for using a "a special United Nations trusteeship over the territory for a limited number of years, at the end of which time sovereignty would be turned over to Indonesia"; and in March 1961 the U.S. Embassy in Jakarta asserted "the Indos once contended that UN trusteeship would be anathema under any circumstances. Now, although they have not gone so far as to be willing to call a trusteeship a trusteeship, they talk in terms of "one or two years" of some kind of interregnum as being acceptable." The Netherlands refused to directly transfer the colony to Indonesia and, with Operation Trikora underway, requested the UN dictate self-determination rights in 1962. On 15 August, Indonesia and The Netherlands signed the New York Agreement, which promulgated a transfer via a temporary United Nations administration.

The United Nations General Assembly approved the agreement and accepted administration on 21 September in General Assembly resolution 1752. The UN administration took effect on 1 October 1962.

The transfer of authority took place on 1 May 1963 and West New Guinea became a province of Indonesia known as West Irian (Irian Barat). It was agreed that following the transfer of authority Elias Jan Bonai, a member of the New Guinea Council, would be appointed as the first Indonesian Governor. An Indonesian orchestrated "Determination of the People's Opinion" was held in 1969. West Irian later evolved into the present-day provinces of Papua, Southwest Papua, Central Papua, South Papua, Highland Papua and West Papua.

== Administration ==
=== Civil administration ===
According to the New York Agreement, UNTEA could legislate, appoint government officials, and guarantee law and order. These permissions led to the establishment of a court system, a New Guinea Council and regional councils. An official gazette was established on 1 October 1962. During the seven-month transition period Dutch civil servants and officials were slowly recalled to the Netherlands and were replaced by, UN, local and Indonesian officials.

A deliberative body known as the New Guinea Council was convened by the administrator on 4 December 1962. The administrator had the power to appoint members to the council and to fill any vacancies that may have arisen. Eleven regional representative councils were also established.

=== Office holders ===
==== Administrator ====
UNTEA was initially led by acting administrator José Rolz-Bennett of Guatemala from 1 October 1962 to 15 November, and then by Jalal Abdoh of the Imperial State of Iran who served as administrator from 15 November 1962 to 30 April 1963.

No.	Portrait	Name (Birth–Death)	Term of office		
No.	Portrait	Name (Birth–Death)	Took office	Left office	Time in office
-		José Rolz-Bennett	1 October 1962	15 November 1962	45 days
1		Jalal Abdoh	15 November 1962	30 April 1963	166 days

=== International relations ===
==== Travel documents ====
UNTEA had the authority to issue travel documents to residents of Western New Guinea. The Netherlands and Indonesia were responsible for providing consular assistance and protection abroad to persons carrying UNTEA issued travel documents.

==== Liaison offices ====
The following countries established liaison offices in Hollandia:

- Netherlands
- Indonesia
- Australia

== Security and law enforcement ==
In addition to civil administration, the United Nations also had a peacekeeping role through the United Nations Security Force in West New Guinea (UNSF). The maximum force strength was 1,500 infantry and 76 aircraft personnel. Pakistan, Canada and United States contributed personnel with Pakistan providing 1,500 troops and the United States and Canada contributing 60 and 16 air force personnel respectively. The locally recruited Papuan Volunteer Corps, established by the Netherlands in 1961, was also placed under UNSF command. The Force Commander for the UNSF was Said Uddin Khan of Pakistan.

Following the departure of Dutch police officers, Philippine officers were initially drafted in as an interim measure, before being replaced by Indonesian officers under UNTEA command.

== Postal history ==
Nineteen postage stamps, as well as some postal stationery items, were issued by UNTEA. These were created by overprinting existing stocks of Netherlands New Guinea issues. At the time packets of all stamps were sold at UN Headquarters by the United Nations Postal Administration and they remain readily available on the retail market.

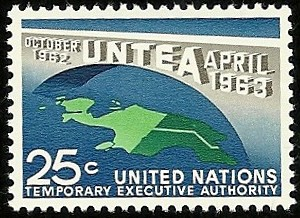
UNTEA postage stamp

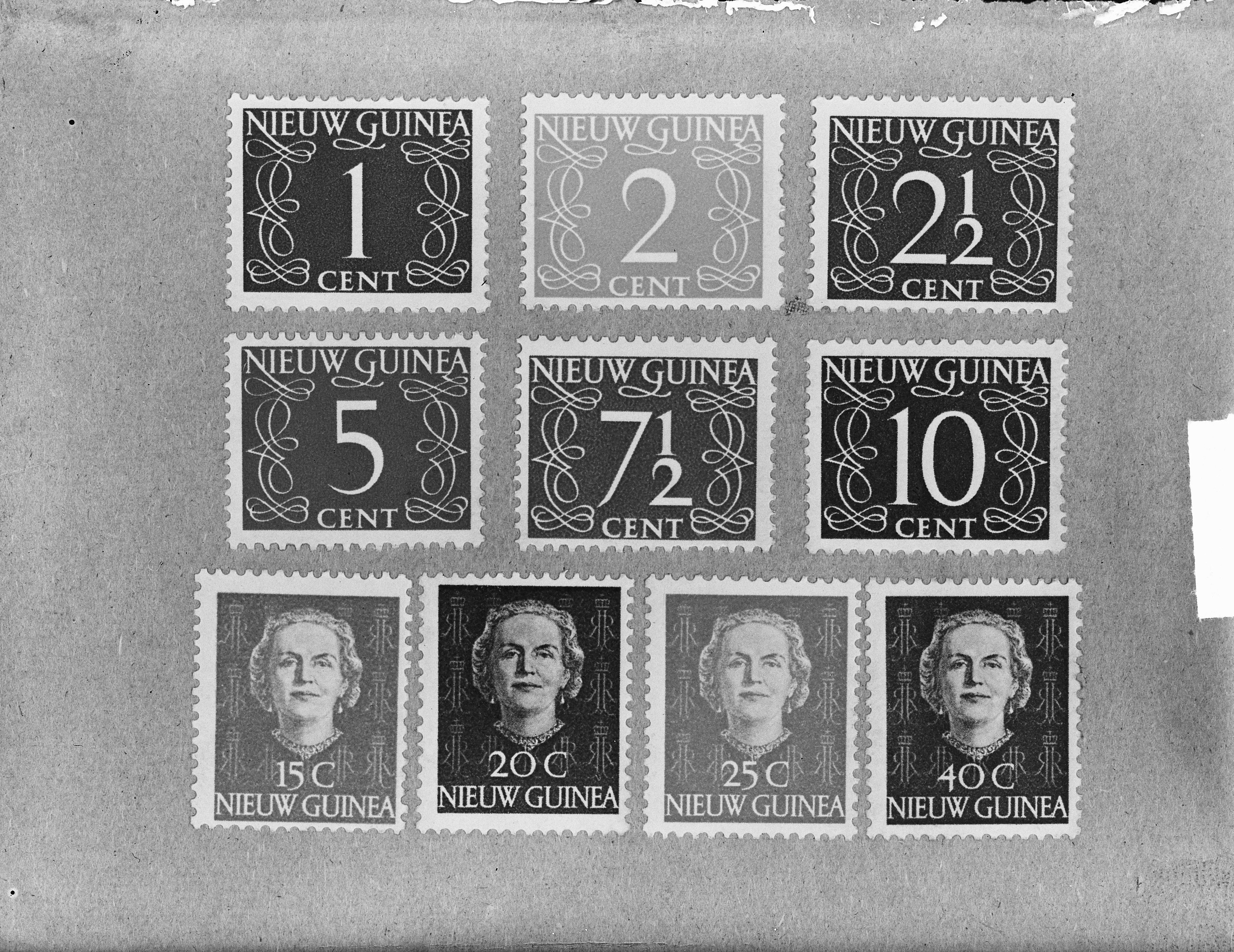
Netherlands New Guinea stamps were overprinted by UNTEA

== See also ==
- List of territories governed by the United Nations
