= United Nations–administered Kosovo =

UN-administered territory from 1999 to 2008

Kosovo: Kosovë (Albanian); Косово / Kosovo (Serbian)
- 1999–2008 (de facto)
- Flag Coat of arms

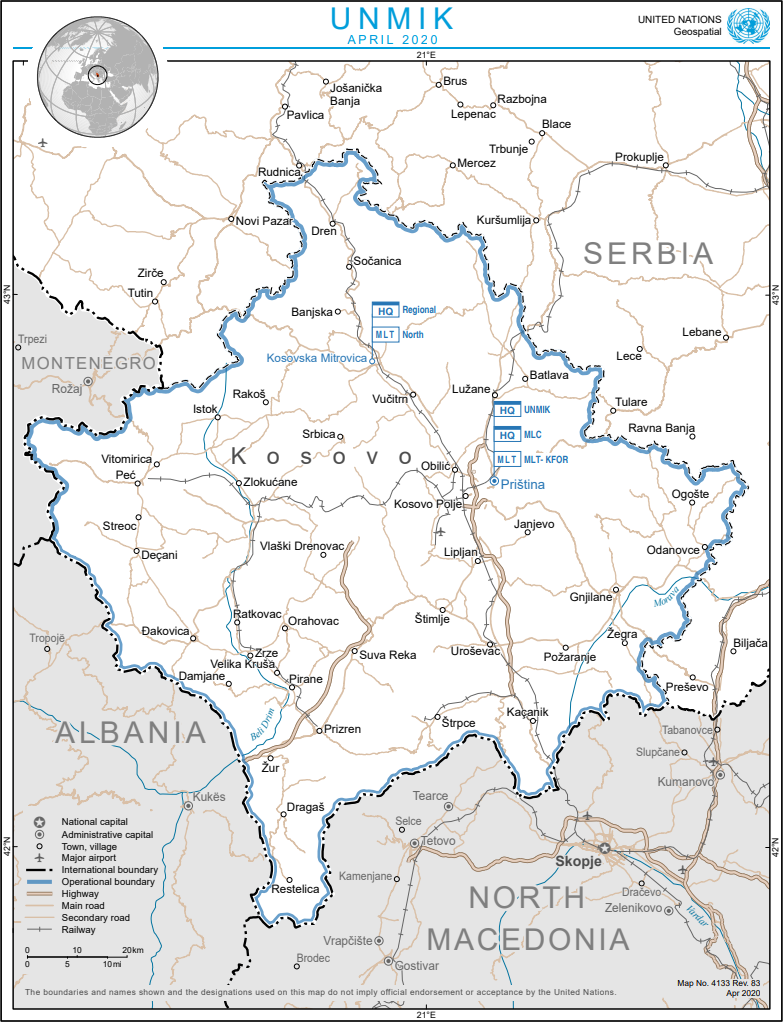
- Map of Kosovo
- Status: Entity under interim international administration
- Capital: Pristina
- Common languages: Albanian; Serbian; Bosnian; Turkish
- Special Representative
  - 1999–2001: Bernard Kouchner
  - 2006–2008: Joachim Rücker
- President
  - 2002–2006: Ibrahim Rugova
  - 2006–2008: Fatmir Sejdiu
- Prime Minister
  - 2002–2004: Bajram Rexhepi
  - 2008: Hashim Thaçi
- Legislature: Transitional Council (1999–2001); Assembly (2001–2008)
- History
  - UN Security Council Resolution 1244: 10 June 1999
  - Unilateral declaration of independence: 17 February 2008 (de facto)

Area
  - Total: 10,887 km^{2} (4,203 sq mi)

Population
- 2,067,507
- Currency: Deutsche Mark (1999–2001); Euro (2002–2008)
- ISO 3166 code: UNK
Preceded by	Succeeded by
Republic of Kosova; Federal Republic of Yugoslavia	Kosovo

Between 1999 and 2008, the United Nations Interim Administration Mission in Kosovo (UNMIK) was directly responsible for the governance of Kosovo. This period began on 10 June 1999 with the adoption of United Nations Security Council Resolution 1244 and effectively ended on 17 February 2008 with the unilateral declaration of independence of Kosovo.

== Background ==
In 1945, at the conclusion of the Second World War, Kosovo was organised within the Socialist Federal Republic of Yugoslavia (SFRY) as the Autonomous Region of Kosovo and Metohija. In 1963 the region was reorganised as the Autonomous Province of Kosovo and Metohija with increased autonomy and was renamed as the Socialist Autonomous Province of Kosovo in 1968. In 1975 Kosovo was granted significantly increased levels of autonomy. In 1990, under the regime of Slobodan Milošević, the level of autonomy was reduced and the official name reverted to the Autonomous Province of Kosovo and Metohija.

In 1991, during the breakup of Yugoslavia, ethnic Albanian representatives of the Provincial Assembly unilaterally declared the Republic of Kosova and established parallel instructions for education, medical care, and taxation. Serbia and Montenegro formed the Federal Republic of Yugoslavia (FRY) in April 1992. Ethnic tensions increased between Yugoslav authorities and the Ethnic Albanian guerilla movement, the Kosovo Liberation Army, resulting in the Kosovo War breaking out in February 1998. In March 1999, NATO proposed the Rambouillet Agreement which would have granted Kosovo substantial autonomy within the Federal Republic of Yugoslavia. The agreement was accepted by the Kosovo Albanian side but rejected by the Yugoslav side prompting the NATO bombing of Yugoslavia on 24 March 1999. On 9 June 1999, NATO and the Federal Republic Yugoslavia reached the Kumanovo Agreement whereby Kosovo would be placed under United Nations administration. This arrangement was formalised by the passing of United Nations Security Council Resolution 1244 on 10 June 1999 which established the United Nations Interim Administration Mission in Kosovo.

Kosovo unilaterally declared independence on 17 February 2008 as the Republic of Kosovo. Serbia continues to claim Kosovo as the Autonomous Province of Kosovo and Metohija.

== Administrative history ==
United Nations Security Council Resolution 1244 allowed for the "[deployment] in Kosovo, under United Nations auspices, [an] international civil and security [presence]". The first regulation passed by the Special Representative of the Secretary General, on 25 July 1999, established that UNMIK was responsible for all legislative and executive authority in Kosovo. That regulation also stated that all laws applicable in Kosovo prior to 24 March 1999 would continue to apply in Kosovo insofar as they do not conflict with "internationally recognized human rights standards and shall not discriminate against any person on any ground such as sex, race, colour, language, religion, political or other opinion, national, ethnic or social origin, association with a national community, property, birth or other status". This was later amended to state that the law applicable would be that as it stood on 22 March 1989.

=== Initial arrangements ===
A twelve-member Kosovo Transitional Council was formed on 16 July 1999. Chaired by the SRSG, the KTC was the described as being the highest political consultative body within the United Nations administration. Its purpose was to offer the main political parties and ethnic communities in Kosovo an opportunity for direct input into the decision-making process of UNMIK.

=== Joint Interim Administrative Structure ===
A more formal system of administration was put in place on 30 January 2000 when a Joint Interim Administrative Structure was established. The membership of the Kosovo Transitional Council was expanded and it assumed the role of a deliberative assembly. A transitional cabinet, known as the Interim Administrative Council, was established with eight members, four of which were appointed by UNMIK and four by political parties in Kosovo.

=== Provisional Institutions of Self Government ===
Resolution 1244 permitted the United Nations to establish and oversee the development of "provisional, democratic self-governing institutions" in Kosovo. To achieve this aim, a Constitutional Framework for Self-Government in Kosovo was promulgated in May which would established Provisional Institutions of Self-Government. The institutions included establishing a directly elected Assembly of Kosovo which would nominate a President and a Government led by a Prime Minister. Elections for the new assembly were held on 17 November 2001 and on 4 March 2002, Ibrahim Rugova was appointed as President and a cabinet was formed led by Bajram Rexhepi as Prime Minister.

=== Office Holders ===
==== Special Representative of the Secretary-General ====
No.	Name	Lifespan	Term of office		State
—	Sérgio Vieira de Mello	1948–2003	13 June 1999	15 July 1999	Brazil
1	Bernard Kouchner	1939–	15 July 1999	12 January 2001	France
2	Hans Hækkerup	1945–2013	13 January 2001	31 December 2001	Denmark
—	Charles H. Brayshaw	1942–	1 January 2002	14 February 2002	United States
3	Michael Steiner	1949–	14 February 2002	8 July 2003	Germany
—	Charles H. Brayshaw	1942–	8 July 2003	25 August 2003	United States
4	Harri Holkeri	1937–2011	25 August 2003	11 June 2004	Finland
—	Charles H. Brayshaw	1942–	11 June 2004	16 August 2004	United States
5	Søren Jessen-Petersen	1945–	16 August 2004	30 June 2006	Denmark
—	Steven P. Schook	1953–	30 June 2006	31 August 2006	United States
6	Joachim Rücker	1951–	1 September 2006	17 February 2008	Germany

==== President of Kosovo ====
Parties

LDK

No.	Name (Birth–Death)	Portrait	Elected	Term of office		Political party
Presidents; 2002–2008
1	Ibrahim Rugova (1944–2006)		2002	4 March 2002	21 January 2006 (Died in office)	Democratic League
—	Nexhat Daci (1944–2026)		—	21 January 2006	10 February 2006	Democratic League
2	Fatmir Sejdiu (1951–)		2006; 2008	10 February 2006	17 February 2008	Democratic League

==== Prime Minister of Kosovo ====
Parties

PDK LDK AAK PPK Independent

No.	Name (Birth–Death)	Portrait	Elected	Term of office		Political party
Prime Ministers; 2002–2008
1	Bajram Rexhepi (1954–2017)		2001	4 March 2002	3 December 2004	Democratic Party
2	Ramush Haradinaj (1968–)		2004	3 December 2004	8 March 2005	Alliance for the Future
—	Adem Salihaj (1950–); Acting Prime Minister		—	8 March 2005	25 March 2005	Democratic League
3	Bajram Kosumi (1960–)		—	25 March 2005	10 March 2006	Parliamentary Party
4	Agim Çeku (1960–)		—	10 March 2006	9 January 2008	Independent supported by Alliance for the Future
5	Hashim Thaçi (1968–)		2007	9 January 2008	17 February 2008	Democratic Party

==== Cabinets ====
Assumed office	Prime Minister	Composition	Cabinet	Election
15 December 1999	n/a		Interim	
4 March 2002	Bajram Rexhepi		Rexhepi cabinet	2001
3 December 2004	Ramush Haradinaj		First Haradinaj cabinet	2004
25 March 2005	Bajram Kosumi		Kosumi cabinet	2004
10 March 2006	Agim Çeku		Çeku cabinet	2004
9 January 2008	Hashim Thaçi		Second Thaçi cabinet	2007

=== Elections ===
==== Central ====
Prior to the declaration of independence of Kosovo in February 2008, three elections were held for the Provisional Institutions of Self-Government:

- 2001 Kosovan parliamentary election
- 2004 Kosovan parliamentary election
- 2007 Kosovan parliamentary election

==== Local ====
Three local elections were held in Kosovo during the period of direct UN administration:

- 2000 Kosovan local elections
- 2002 Kosovan local elections
- 2007 Kosovan local elections

== Local government ==
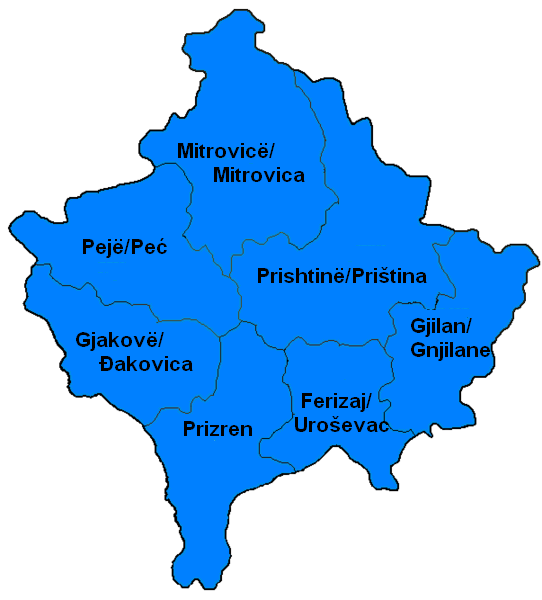
Districts of Kosovo in 2008

Municipalities of Kosovo in 2008

At the start of the period of United Nations administration Kosovo had been divided into five districts. Reforms initiated by UNMIK in 2000 increased the number of districts to seven which were; District of Mitrovica, District of Peja, District of Gjakova, District of Pristina, District of Ferizaj, District of Prizren and District of Gjilan. Each region was overseen by a Regional Administrator appointed by UNMIK.

The districts of Kosovo are divided into municipalities. In 2000, UNMIK merged the municipalities of Gora and Opolje to form the new municipality of Dragash and created a new municipality, Malisheva in Prizren district. New Serb majority municipalities were subsequently created along with the Turkish majority municipality of Mamusha. By 2008, the number of municipalities stood at 38 of which 27 had an Albanian ethnic majority, 10 Serb and 1 Turkish.

Initially, municipalities were administered by Municipal Administrative Boards headed by Municipal Administrators appointed by UNMIK. Local elections were first held on 28 October 2000 to elect Municipal Assemblies for each municipality. Each Municipal Assembly was headed by an Assembly President elected by the members of its Municipal Assembly from within its membership. Further local elections were held on 26 October 2002 under the same model. At the final set of local elections held under United Nations administration on 17 November 2007, each municipality directly elected a Mayor in addition to its Municipal Assembly.

== Security and law enforcement ==
The Kumanovo Agreement, which ended the Kosovo War, and Resolution 1244 required that the Federal Republic of Yugoslavia withdrew its military, paramilitary forces and police from Kosovo. The resolution also required that the Kosovo Liberation Army and other armed Kosovo Albanian armed groups be disbanded. Security in Kosovo was to be provided by a NATO-led international peacekeeping force known as the Kosovo Force (KFOR).

On 21 September 1999, UNMIK established a civil defence service known as the Kosovo Protection Corps to assist in emergency situations such as major fires, industrial accidents, search and rescue operations, humanitarian assistance and demining. The KPC could have up to 3000 full time officers and 2000 reservists of which 10 percent should be from ethnic minority groups. The KPC would not have any role in law enforcement.

Initially law and order in Kosovo was maintained by a United Nations International Police Force. On 6 September 1999, UNMIK established a police school in Vushtrri to train officers for the new Kosovo Police Service which would gradually take over policing duties as it expanded in size and developed further capabilities.

Emblem of KFOR

Emblem of the Kosovo Protection Corps

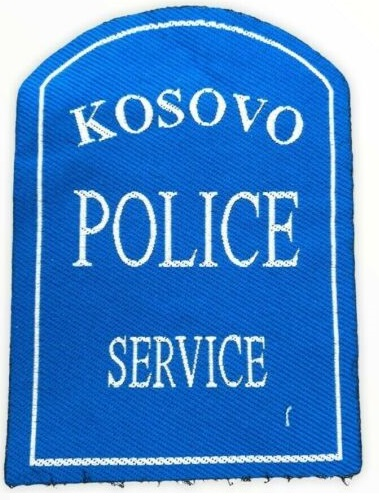
First emblem of the Kosovo Police Service

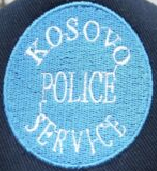
First cap badge of the Kosovo Police Service

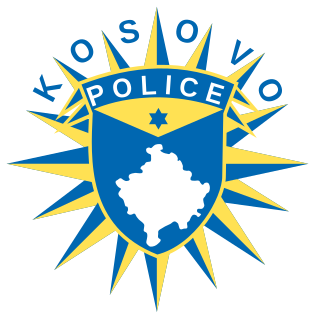
Second emblem of the Kosovo Police Service

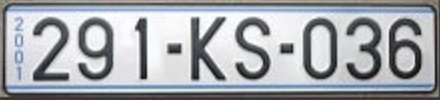
UNMIK issued vehicle registration plate

== International relations ==
=== Membership of international organizations ===
During the period of direct administration by UNMIK, Kosovo gained membership of the following international organisations:

International Organisation	Political Entity Represented	Application date	Admission date	Status
Southeast European Cooperative Initiative (SECI)	UNMIK			Observer
South East Europe Transport Observatory (SEETO)	UNMIK		11 June 2004	Member
Energy Community	UNMIK		1 July 2006	Member
European Common Aviation Area (ECAA)	UNMIK		30 November 2006	Member
Central European Free Trade Agreement (CEFTA)	UNMIK	6 April 2006	26 July 2007	Member

=== Free trade agreements ===
UNMIK signed several free trade agreements with other countries on behalf of Kosovo:

International treaty or convention	Political Entity Represented	Signature	Ratification
Free Trade Agreement with Albania	UNMIK	7 July 2003	1 October 2003
Free Trade Agreement with North Macedonia	UNMIK		2 February 2006
Free Trade Agreement with Croatia	UNMIK	28 September 2006	1 November 2006
Free Trade Agreement with Bosnia and Herzegovina	UNMIK	19 October 2006	1 December 2006

=== International summits and conferences ===
A delegation representing Kosovo, led by SRSG Michael Steiner, participated in the 2003 EU-Western Balkans Summit in Thessaloniki, Greece on 21 June 2003. The members of the delegation included president Ibrahim Rugova, prime minister Bajram Rexhepi and the Inter ministerial Co-ordinator for Returns Milorad Todorovic.

=== Travel documents ===
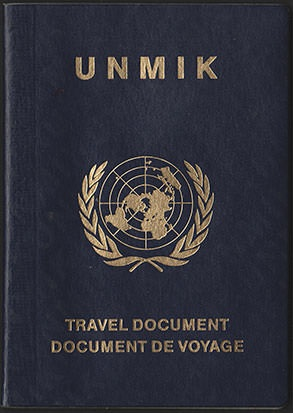
UNMIK Travel Document

Between 2000 and 2008, UNMIK issued passport-sized travel documents to habitual residents of Kosovo for the purpose of foreign travel. The document carried UNMIK travel document/titre de voyage on the cover, contained 32 pages and was valid for two years. The document contained a machine readable strip with the three-letter code "UNK" in place of a country code.

=== Liaison Offices ===
The following countries and international organizations opened Liaison offices in Kosovo during the period of United Nations administration:

- Albania
- Austria
- Bulgaria
- Czech Republic
- European Union
- Finland
- France
- Germany
- Greece
- Hungary
- Luxembourg
- North Macedonia
- Malaysia
- Netherlands
- Russia
- Slovenia
- Sweden
- United Kingdom
- United States

== Sport ==
Logo of the Kosovo Olympic Committee used prior to 2008

In 2003 the Assembly of Kosovo passed the Law on Sports (Law No. 2003/24) which designated the Olympic Committee of Kosovo (OCK) as the highest sports institution in Kosovo The OCK would not become a member of the International Olympic Committee until 2014, after the unilateral declaration of Independence. Unlike the case for East Timor, athletes from Kosovo did not take part as independents at the Olympic Games during the period of UN administration.

At least twenty-three sports federations existed during the period of United Nations administration of which three; the Table Tennis Federation of Kosovo, Handball Federation of Kosovo and Special Olympics Kosovo gained affiliation with their respective international governing body between 1999 and 2008.

=== Participation in multisport events ===
A Special Olympics association for Kosovo was formed in 2002 and athletes from Kosovo took part in the Special Olympics World Games in 2003 and 2007. Athletes from Kosovo also participated at the fourth World Dwarf Games in Rambouillet, France in 2005.

Games	Athletes
(Republic of Ireland) 2003 Special Olympics World Summer Games	4
(France) 2005 World Dwarf Games	
(China) 2007 Special Olympics World Summer Games	4

=== Football ===
The Kosovo Football Federation was established as a branch of the Football Association of Yugoslavia in 1946. A representative team for Kosovo played several unofficial friendly matches between 2002 and 2008 including matches against Albania, Saudi Arabia and Monaco.

Matches

7 September 2002 Friendly	Kosovo	0–1	Albania	Pristina, Kosovo
		Report; Report (RSSSF)	Abazi 45' (o.g.)	Stadium: Pristina City Stadium; Attendance: 25,000; Referee: Bekim Pakuja (Macedonia)

2 November 2005 KTFF 50th Anniversary Cup	Northern Cyprus	1–0	Kosovo	North Nicosia, Northern Cyprus
	Tarik 57'	Report (NFT); Report (RSSSF)		Stadium: Nicosia Atatürk Stadium; Referee: Mehmet Malek (Northern Cyprus)

3 November 2005 KTFF 50th Anniversary Cup	Kosovo	4–1	Sápmi	Girne, Northern Cyprus
	Hasani 39' (pen.); Brando 55'; Nallbani 59'; Ramushi 78'	Report	Johanssen 79'	Stadium: 20 Temmuz Stadium; Attendance: 200

22 April 2006 Friendly	Monaco	1–7	Kosovo	Cap d'Ail, France
	unknown (??)	Report (1st); Report (2nd)	Zeka 15'; Emra 17', 65'; Gashi 29'; Keqi 75'; Llumnica 82'; Idrizi 83'	Stadium: Cap d'Ail Stadium

15 June 2007 Friendly	Kosovo	1–0	Saudi Arabia	Ankara, Turkey
	Nushi 80' (pen.)	Report

=== Basketball ===
The Basketball Federation of Kosovo was founded in 1991. In 2005, the Kosovo national basketball team participated in a friendly tournament in Alexandria where they played against Egypt and Romania.

== Media and communications ==
=== Postal services ===
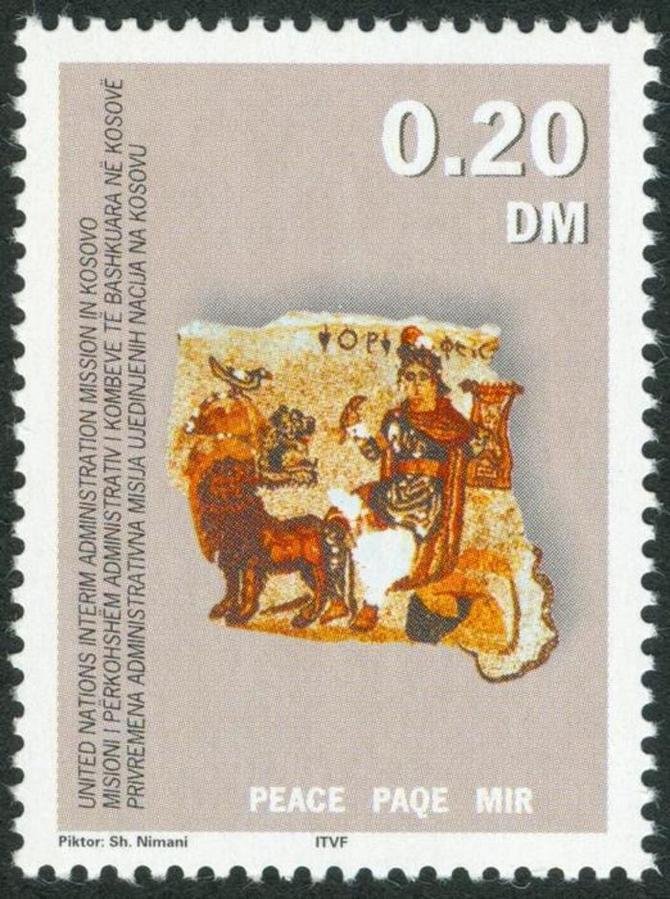
Postage stamp for Kosovo issued by UNMIK in 2000

Kosovo had operated its own postal service within the Socialist Federal Republic of Yugoslavia since 1959. At that time Yugoslav postage stamps were in use. After Kosovo came under United Nations administration, UNMIK became responsible for issuing postage stamps for Kosovo. The first UNMIK issued stamps were released on 15 March 2000 based on the theme of "peace". Further sets were issued by UNMIK up until Kosovo unilaterally declared independence after which stamps were issued in the name of the Republic of Kosovo.

=== Telecommunications ===
The Post, Telephone and Telegraph of Kosovo (PTK) was established in 1959. During the Kosovo conflict, assets of the company were either stolen or destroyed, leading to the interruption of telecommunication services. After the conflict, PTK launched Vala, the largest mobile operator in the territory, with the assistance of Monaco Telecom.

Following the breakup of the SFR Yugoslavia in 1992, which had +38 as country code, Kosovo used the code +381, which was granted to FR Yugoslavia and later used by Serbia for fixed line telephone services. For mobile phone networks, Kosovo based providers used either the Monaco code +377 or the Slovenia code +386. Kosovo would gain its own calling code, +383 in 2017.

== See also ==
- United Nations Interim Administration Mission in Kosovo
- OSCE Mission in Kosovo
- Autonomous Province of Kosovo and Metohija
- List of territories governed by the United Nations
- United Nations Administered East Timor
- United Nations Administered West New Guinea
