= United Nations Transitional Authority in Cambodia =

Peacekeeping mission, 1992–1993

- Abbreviation: UNTAC
- Formation: 28 February 1992
- Type: Monitoring, peacekeeping
- Legal status: Ended September 1993
- Head: Yasushi Akashi
- Parent organization: United Nations Security Council
- Website: UNTAC Website

The United Nations Transitional Authority in Cambodia (UNTAC) (Note: Khmer: អាជ្ញាធរអង្គការសហប្រជាជាតិ បណ្ដោះអាសន្ននៅកម្ពុជា Arabic: سلطة الأمم المتحدة الانتقالية في كمبوديا Chinese: 联合国柬埔寨过渡时期权力机构 French: Autorité provisoire des Nations unies au Cambodge Russian: Организация Объединенных Наций Временный орган в Камбодже Spanish: Autoridad Provisional de las Naciones Unidas en Camboya) was a United Nations administrative and peacekeeping operation in Cambodia in 1992–93 formed following the 1991 Paris Peace Accords. This was the first occasion in which the UN directly assumed responsibility for the administration of an outright independent state (though the UN did administer the former Dutch territory of Netherlands New Guinea between 1962 and 1963 prior), rather than simply monitoring or supervising the area. The UN transitional authority organized and ran elections, had its own radio station and jail, and was responsible for promoting and safeguarding human rights at the national level.

== Establishment and mandate ==
UNTAC was established in February 1992 under United Nations Security Council Resolution 745 in agreement with the State of Cambodia, the de facto government of the country at that time, to implement the Paris Peace Accords of October 1991. UNTAC was the product of intense diplomatic activity over many years.

UNTAC's aim was to restore peace and civil government in a country ruined by decades of civil war and Cold War machinations, to hold free and fair elections leading to a new constitution and to "kick-start" the rehabilitation of the country. It was to exercise 'supervision' or 'supervision or control' over all aspects of government, including foreign affairs, national defence, finance, public security and information, and to supervise, monitor and verify the withdrawal and non-return of foreign military forces.

Its mission was also to canton, disarm and demobilize Cambodia's fighting factions, confiscate caches of weapons and military supplies, promote and protect human rights, oversee military security and maintain law and order, repatriate and resettle refugees and displaced persons, assist in mine clearance and the establishment of training programmes in mine clearance and mine awareness, rehabilitate essential infrastructure and assist in economic reconstruction and development.

Another important goal was the trial of senior Khmer Rouge leaders. The process that was initiated during the UNTAC led on 4 October 2004, to the ratification of an agreement with the United Nations by the Cambodian National Assembly on the establishment of a tribunal to try senior leaders responsible for the atrocities committed by the Khmer Rouge. Donor countries pledged the $43 million international share of the three-year tribunal budget, while the Cambodian government's share of the budget was $13.3 million. The first trials of senior Khmer Rouge leaders took place only in 2007, when many of them were already dead or in ill-health.

== Staff ==
Headed by Chief of Mission Yasushi Akashi (Japan), Force Commander Lieutenant-General John Sanderson (Australia), and Police Commissioner Brigadier-General Klaas Roos (Netherlands), UNTAC involved approximately 15,900 military, 3,400 civilian police, 2,000 civilians and 450 UN volunteers, as well as locally recruited staff and interpreters. During the electoral period, more than 50,000 Cambodians served as electoral staff and some 900 international polling station officers were seconded from Governments. The whole operation cost over $1.6 billion (equivalent to $2.5 billion in 2017), mostly in salaries for expatriates.

== Participating countries ==
The 46 participating countries providing military observers, police, or troops were:

- Algeria
- Argentina
- Australia
- Austria
- Bangladesh
- Belgium
- Brunei
- Bulgaria
- Cameroon
- Canada
- Chile
- China
- Colombia
- Côte d'Ivoire
- Denmark
- Egypt
- Fiji
- France
- Germany
- Ghana
- Hungary
- India
- Indonesia
- Ireland
- Italy
- Japan
- Jordan
- Kenya
- Malaysia
- Morocco
- Namibia
- Nepal
- Netherlands
- New Zealand
- Nigeria
- Norway
- Pakistan
- Peru
- Philippines
- Poland
- Russia
- Senegal
- Singapore
- Sweden
- Tanzania
- Thailand
- Tunisia
- Turkey
- United Kingdom
- United States
- Uruguay

== 1993 Cambodian general election ==
=== Buildup ===
Leading up to the 1993 elections, which were to be supervised by UNTAC, the guerilla armies of the surviving Khmer Rouge sabotaged peacekeepers, refusing to participate in the ballots altogether. They also directly attacked the state, as on November 11, 1991, when 200 to 300 of Pol Pot's soldiers conducted a mission against the Cambodian army–demonstrating an open violation of the ceasefire agreement. Meanwhile, the Cambodian People's Party (CPP) also sought to stay in power and appointed death squads to target the Khmer Rouge, among other oppositional groups like FUNCINPEC and the Buddhist Liberal Democratic Party (BLDP). Led by Prime Minister Hun Sen, these death squads were effective because they became indistinguishable from law enforcement. One such group called T-90 framed their suspects as criminals, then arrested them. By forming bonds with both the UN and police, “the same people who were behind the crimes were able to influence investigations."

=== Results ===
Over 4 million Cambodians (about 90% of eligible voters) participated in the May 1993 elections, although the Khmer Rouge or Party of Democratic Kampuchea (PDK), whose forces were never actually disarmed or demobilised, barred some people from participating. Prince Norodom Ranariddh's FUNCINPEC party was the top vote recipient with a 45.5% vote, followed by Hun Sen's Cambodian People's Party and the Buddhist Liberal Democratic Party, respectively. FUNCINPEC then entered into a coalition with the other parties that had participated in the election.

The parties represented in the 120-member constituent assembly proceeded to draft and approve a new constitution, which was promulgated 24 September 1993. It established a multiparty liberal democracy in the framework of a constitutional monarchy, with the former Prince Sihanouk elevated to King. Prince Ranariddh and Hun Sen became First and Second Prime Ministers, respectively, in the Royal Cambodian Government (RGC). The constitution provides for a wide range of internationally recognised human rights.

=== Aftermath ===
Although UNTAC ultimately disarmed the fighting factions, including around 50,000 troops, tension continued in the coalition between FUNCINPEC and the CPP. Four years of back-and-forth struggle culminated in the FUNCINPEC’s attempted coup in July 1997, resulting in their defeat by the CPP. This event marked a shift in the CPP’s approach in targeting oppositional groups, away from simply throwing grenades at party members, as was common in the 1990s, and towards more subtle tactics, such as press domination and incarceration of members.

== Criticism ==
=== Disarmament ===
Despite UNTAC's boasting of its effectiveness and being feted by the international community as a success, UNTAC failed to disarm the Khmer Rouge, while effectively disarming the SOC's local militias. This bias allowed the Khmer Rouge to make territorial gains and gave rise to political violence. The State of Cambodia's military leaders were furious, claiming that UNTAC was extremely exacting with the disarmament of the CPAF, but too lenient and ineffective when it came to disarm the Khmer Rouge.

=== HIV/AIDS ===
Norodom Sihanouk had reservations about the UNTAC operation. The massive presence of foreign troops led to the abuse of some Cambodian women, boosting prostitution and possibly driving a spike in the prevalence of HIV/AIDS by introducing the virus from other affected countries. The number of sex workers in the State of Cambodia rose from about 6,000 in 1991, to over 20,000 after the arrival of UNTAC personnel in 1992. By 1995 there were between 50,000 and 90,000 Cambodians affected by AIDS according to a WHO estimate.

=== Japan's engagement in UNTAC ===
On April 8, 1993, Japanese election observer Atsuhito Nakata and his Cambodian interpreter were killed in Kampong Thom city, Kampong Thom province after he requested for assistance from UN peacekeepers because of security concerns. It's not known who killed him. On May 4, 1993, Inspector Haruyuki Takata of the NPA was shot and killed in an ambush despite being escorted by Dutch soldiers. Takata was promoted to superintendent after his death. Their deaths led to criticism in the public and in the Diet with calls for them to withdraw. Prime Minister Miyazawa refused to withdraw Japanese personnel from UNTAC.

According to unreleased UN reports, four JGSDF peacekeepers and 20 Japanese police officers deserted their posts, the latter using UN vehicles to go to Bangkok, with suggestions that Tokyo did not try to stop it, which was criticized by UN officials in Cambodia.

== Statistics ==
- Duration: March 1992 – September 1993
- Strength: Approximately 22,000 military and civilian personnel
- Fatalities: 78 (4 military observers, 41 other military personnel, 14 civilian police, 5 international civilian staff and 14 local staff).
- Expenditures: US$1.62 billion (UNAMIC and UNTAC combined)

== See also ==
- United Nations Administered Cambodia
- UN protectorate
- Emergency Sex and Other Desperate Measures
