= United Nations Transitional Administration in East Timor =

Peacekeeping mission, 1999–2002

- Abbreviation: UNTAET
- Formation: 25 October 1999
- Type: Special political mission
- Legal status: Completed on 20 May 2002
- Headquarters: Dili, East Timor
- Head: Ian Martin (1999); Sérgio Vieira de Mello (1999–2002)
- Parent organization: United Nations Security Council
- Website: www.un.org/en/peacekeeping/missions/past/etimor/etimor.htm

The United Nations Transitional Administration in East Timor (UNTAET, Portuguese: Administração Transitória das Nações Unidas em Timor Leste) was a United Nations mission in East Timor that aimed to solve the decades-long East Timorese crisis in the area occupied by Indonesian military. UNTAET provided an interim civil administration and a peacekeeping mission in the territory of East Timor, from its establishment on 25 October 1999, until its independence on 20 May 2002, following the outcome of the East Timor Special Autonomy Referendum. The transitional administration was established by United Nations Security Council Resolution 1272 in 1999.

A rarity for United Nations peacekeeping missions, UNTAET involved the United Nations directly administering the territory of East Timor. The mission's responsibilities included providing a peacekeeping force to maintain security and order; facilitating and co-ordinating relief assistance to the East Timorese; facilitating emergency rehabilitation of physical infrastructure; administering East Timor and creating structures for sustainable governance and the rule of law; and assisting in the drafting of a new constitution and conducting elections.

UNTAET was established on 25 October 1999, by United Nations Security Council Resolution 1272. The mission was led by Sérgio Vieira de Mello of Brazil (Special Representative of the Secretary-General for East Timor). The International Force East Timor (INTERFET) transitioned to the UNTAET Peacekeeping Force (PKF) in February 2000 and was commanded by Filipino military officer Lieutenant General Jaime de los Santos (Force Commander UNTAET). UNTAET was abolished on 20 May 2002, with most functions passed to the East Timor government. The military and police forces were transferred to the newly created United Nations Mission of Support to East Timor (UNMISET).

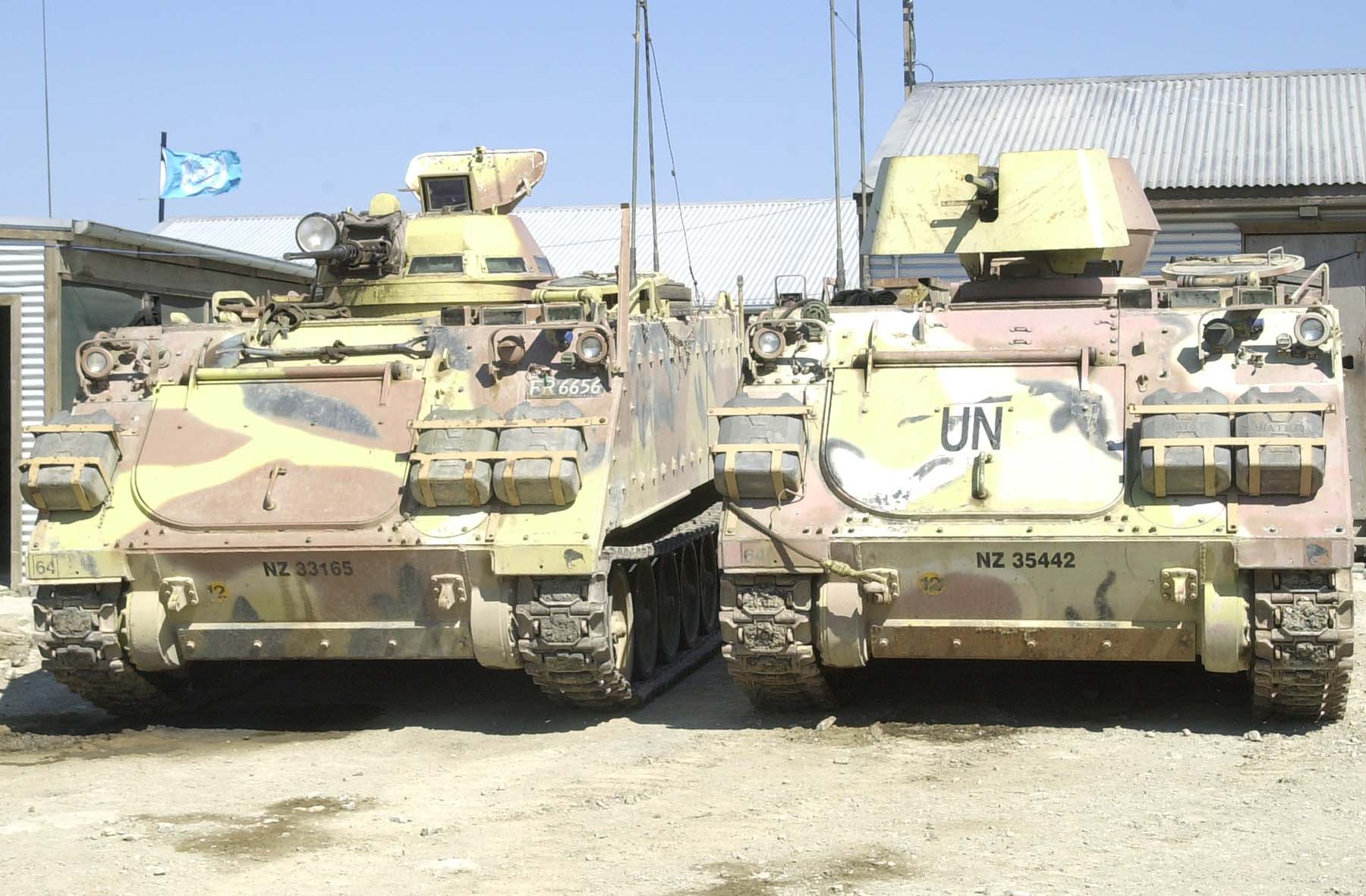
New Zealand M113A1 armoured personnel carriers of UNTAET at the Gate Pa base in the southern Suai area, 2002

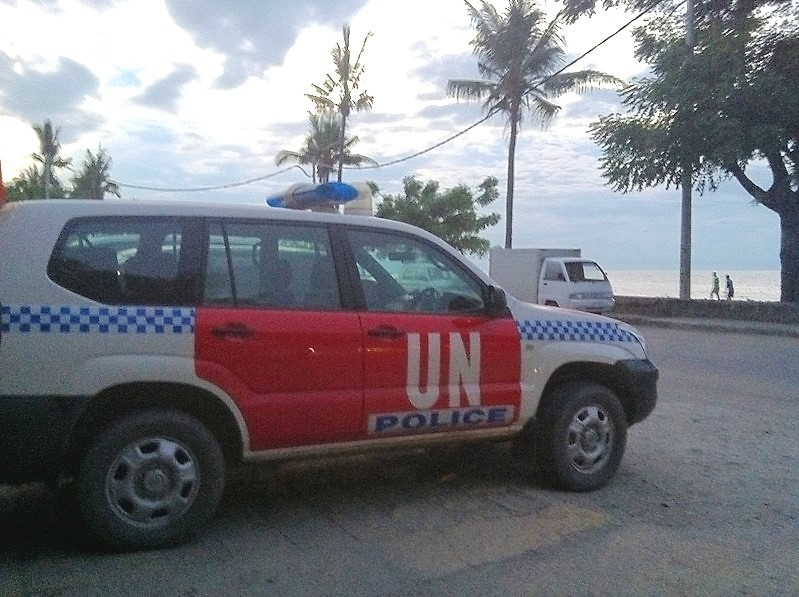
UN Police car in Dili

UNTAET was wound up upon East Timorese independence but a United Nations presence in East Timor would continue through a newly established United Nations Mission of Support in East Timor (UNMISET).

== Contributing nations ==
A coalition of nations sent troops to support the peace keeping mission. The forces were led by Australia, which provided the largest contingent and the out of theatre base for operations, supported by Portugal who sent the second largest contingent securing the key central areas of the country, followed by New Zealand, who took responsibility for the southern West sector with supporting troops from Ireland, Fiji, Nepal, and Singapore. France also sent special forces who joined the ANZACs on the first day, as well as contingents from Brazil, Canada, Denmark, Italy, Kenya, Japan, Malaysia, Singapore, South Korea, Thailand, the Philippines, Sweden, and the United Kingdom. While the United States supported the transition authority, it did so mainly by underwriting contracts to replace destroyed infrastructure and thus avoided a direct military involvement, allowing the ANZAC led force to take the lead. The United States did, however, deploy a contingent of American police officers to serve with the International Police.

== Head of Mission ==
Ian Martin and Sérgio Vieira de Mello served as Special Representative of the Secretary-General for East Timor during UNTAET's period of operation.

No.	Portrait	Name (Birth–Death)	Election	Term of office		
No.	Portrait	Name (Birth–Death)	Election	Took office	Left office	Time in office
-		Ian Martin (acting)	n/a	25 October 1999	19 November 1999	25 days
1		Sérgio Vieira de Mello (1948–2003)	n/a	19 November 1999	20 May 2002	2 years, 182 days

== See also ==
- United Nations Administered East Timor
- International Force for East Timor
- Timeline of UN peacekeeping missions
- UN protectorate
- United Nations Interim Administration Mission in Kosovo, a similar arrangement for Kosovo
- United Nations Mission in East Timor
- United Nations Mission of Support to East Timor
- United Nations Integrated Mission in East Timor
