= United Nations–administered East Timor =

UN-administered territory from 1999 and 2002

East Timor Timor-Leste (Portuguese) Timor Lorosa'e (Tetum)
- 1999–2002
- Flag Emblem

- Location of East Timor at the end of the Indonesian archipelago.
- Status: United Nations administered territory
- Capital: Dili
- Common languages: Tetum; Portuguese; Indonesian; English
- Type: UNTAET
- Transitional Administrator
  - 1999: Ian Martin
  - 1999–2002: Sérgio Vieira de Mello
- Chief Minister
  - 2001–2002: Mari Alkatiri
- Legislature: National Council (1999-2001); Constituent Assembly (2001-2002)
- History
  - UN Security Council Resolution 1272: 25 October 1999
  - Independence: 20 May 2002

Area
  - Total: 15,007 km^{2} (5,794 sq mi)

Population
- 947,000
- Currency: United States dollar
- ISO 3166 code: TL
Preceded by	Succeeded by
Indonesian occupied East Timor	Timor-Leste

United Nations–administered East Timor refers to the period when between 25 October 1999 and 20 May 2002, Timor-Leste was governed by the United Nations Transitional Administration in East Timor as a United Nations administered territory.

== Background ==
East Timor was colonised by Portugal in the mid-16th century and administered as Portuguese Timor. Following the Carnation Revolution in Portugal, East Timor unilaterally declared independence as the Democratic Republic of East Timor on 28 November 1975, but was invaded by Indonesia 7 December 1975. East Timor was occupied by Indonesia and administered as Timor Timur province. The invasion was not recognized as legal by the United Nations, which continued to regard Portugal as the legal Administering Power of East Timor. In 1999, in a UN-sponsored referendum, an overwhelming majority of East Timorese voted for independence from Indonesia. Immediately following the referendum, Pro-Indonesia militias commenced a scorched earth campaign triggering the 1999 East Timorese crisis. An International Force for East Timor was deployed to the territory to bring the violence to an end. Indonesia formally rescinded its annexation on 19 October 1999 and a United Nations transitional administration was subsequently established on 25 October 1999 by Security Council Resolution 1272 to administer the territory until independence on 20 May 2002.

== Administrative history ==
=== Initial administrative arrangements ===
A fifteen member National Consultative Council was established in December 1999 by UNTAET REG 1999/2, and served as a forum for East Timorese political and community leaders to advise the Transitional Administrator and discuss policy issues. The Council had eleven Timorese members and four international members. A Transitional Judicial Service Commission was also established to ensure representation of East Timorese leaders in decisions affecting the judiciary in East Timor. The Commission was made up of three Timorese representatives and two international experts.

=== First transitional administration ===
In July 2000 the membership of the renamed National Council was expanded to 33 members including, one representative from each of the 13 districts of East Timor. All the members were now Timorese and represented the main political parties and religious communities of East Timor. The National Council became a legislature style body and had the right to debate any future regulations issued by UNTAET. Mário Viegas Carrascalão was the speaker of the National Council.

On 15 July 2000, an executive body Transitional Cabinet was formed comprising four Timorese members and four international members.

Progress was made in the development of a judicial system with a Prosecutor General's Office and a Defender Service established. District Courts and Court of Appeal were also established.

A voter registration process was completed during this period and preparations were made for elections to a Constituent Assembly that would prepare East Timor for independence expected in 2002.

=== Second transitional administration ===
Elections for an 88-member Constituent Assembly were held on 30 August 2001, the second anniversary of the autonomy referendum, which resulted in a majority of seats for the Fretilin party. The Assembly nominated a Council of Ministers the following month. The Council of Ministers had 24 members and was led by Chief Minister Mari Alkatiri.

The Constituent Assembly completed work on a draft constitution and this was promulgated in March 2002, the Assembly would serve as the parliament of East Timor following independence.

Presidential elections were held in April in which Xanana Gusmão was elected president of a future independent East Timor.

East Timor became an independent state on 20 May 2002.

=== Office holders ===
==== Transitional administrator ====
Sérgio Vieira de Mello served as Special Representative of the Secretary-General for East Timor (Transitional Administrator) during the period East Timor was administered by the United Nations.

No.	Portrait	Name (Birth–Death)	Election	Term of office			Political party
No.	Portrait	Name (Birth–Death)	Election	Took office	Left office	Time in office	Political party
-		Ian Martin (born 1946)	n/a	25 October 1999	19 November 1999	25 days	n/a
1		Sérgio Vieira de Mello (1948–2003)	n/a	19 November 1999	20 May 2002	2 years, 182 days	n/a

==== Chief minister ====
Mari Alkatiri served as Chief Minister of East Timor between September 2001 and May 2002.

No.	Portrait	Name (Birth–Death)	Election	Term of office			Political party
No.	Portrait	Name (Birth–Death)	Election	Took office	Left office	Time in office	Political party
1		Mari Alkatiri (born 1949)	2001	20 September 2001	20 May 2002	212 days	Fretilin

==== Cabinets ====
Assumed office	Chief Minister	Cabinet	Election
15 July 2000	n/a	Interim	n/a
20 September 2001	Mari Alkatiri	Alkatiri cabinet	2001

=== Elections ===
The following elections were held during United Nations administration:

- 2001 East Timorese parliamentary election
- 2002 East Timorese presidential election

== Local government ==
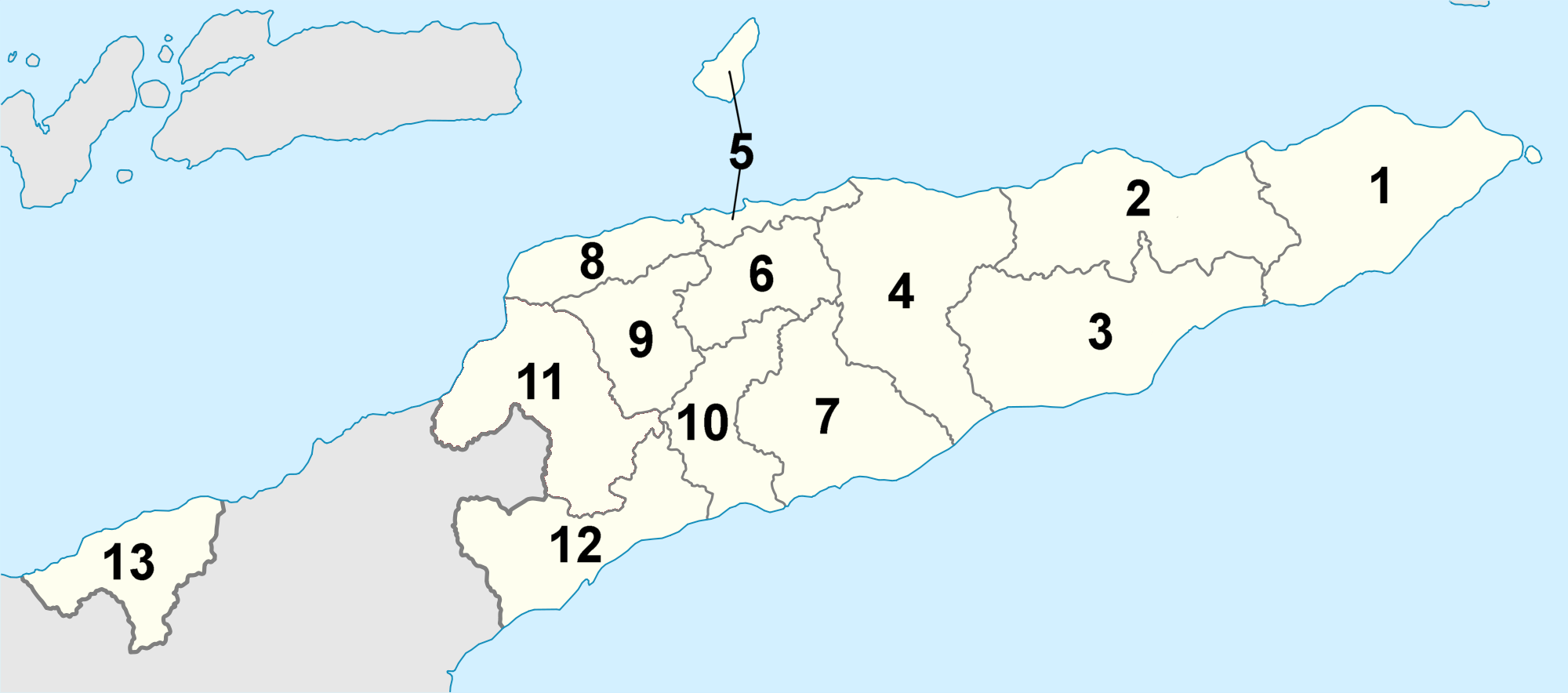
Map of the districts of East Timor.

During the period of United Nations administration, East Timor was divided into thirteen districts:

1. Lautém
2. Baucau
3. Viqueque
4. Manatuto
5. Dili
6. Aileu
7. Manufahi
8. Liquiçá
9. Ermera
10. Ainaro
11. Bobonaro
12. Cova Lima
13. Oecusse

Each district was headed by an UNTAET appointed District Administrator supported by District Advisory Councils with representation from political parties, the Catholic Church, women and youth groups.

== Security and law enforcement ==
Security was initially provided by the International Force for East Timor (INTERFET) but was assumed by UNTAET Peace-Keeping Force (PKF) in February 2000. The formation of an East Timor Defence Force was approved in September 2000 which was formally established in February 2001. At the same time, the pro-independence guerrilla movement FALINTIL was officially disbanded, with many of its members joining the new defence force.

Initially law and order in East Timor was maintained by an international United Nations Civilian Police Force (CIVPOL). Recruitment and training for a local police force commenced by UNTAET in April 2000 and an East Timor Police Service was established in August 2001. Prisons were established at Dili, Becora and Gleno. A Serious Crimes Unit and Crime Scene Detachment also existed to investigate human rights abuses during the period of Indonesian occupation and its immediate aftermath.

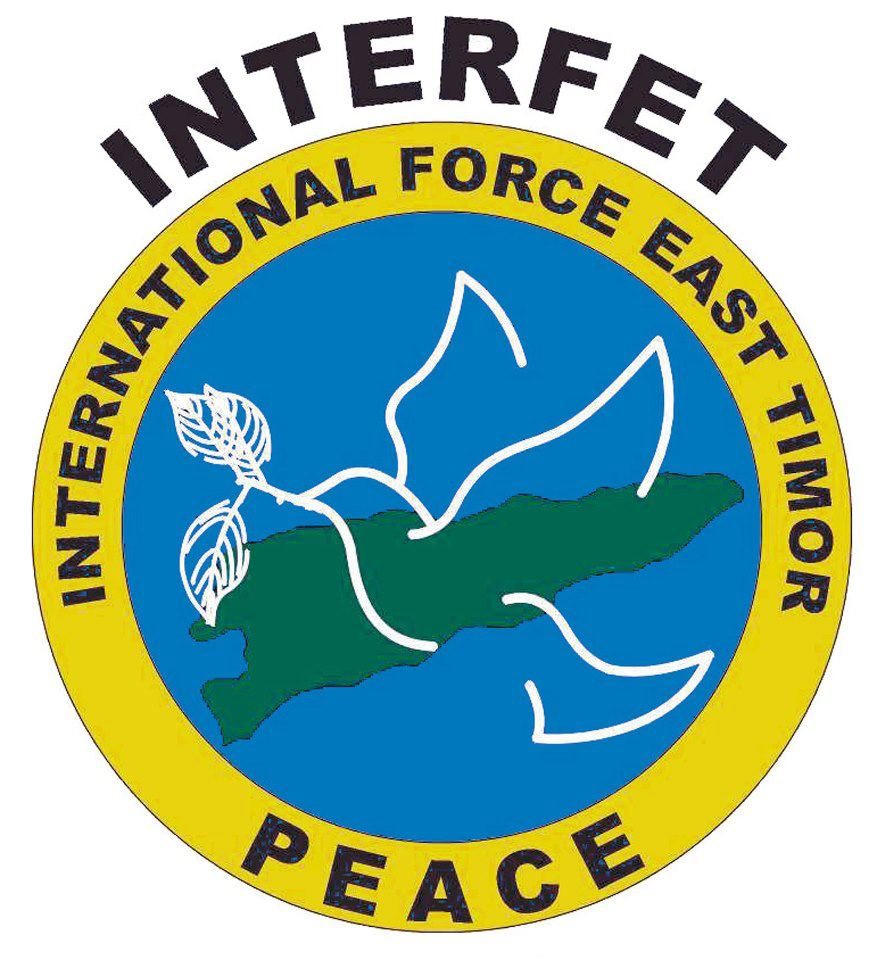
Emblem of INTERFET

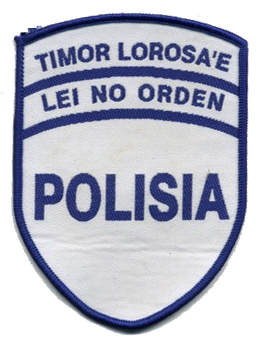
Patch of the East Timor Police Service 2001-2002

== International relations ==
=== Travel documents ===
UNTAET issued temporary travel documents to residents of East Timor who wished to travel abroad.

=== Liaison Offices ===
The following countries opened Liaison offices in East Timor during the period of United Nations administration:

- Australia
- China
- Indonesia
- Japan
- Portugal
- United Kingdom
- United States

=== Sport ===
Four East Timorese athletes participated in the 2000 Summer Olympics and two athletes participated in the 2000 Summer Paralympics in Sydney, Australia.

Games	Athletes
(Australia) 2000 Summer Olympics	4
(Australia) 2000 Summer Paralympics	2

== Media and communications ==
=== UNTAET public information ===
The UN-led interim administration maintained a local FM radio station, "Radio UNTAET", a TV station, "TV UNTAET" and published a fortnightly newsletter known as "Tais Timor" in English, Portuguese, Tetum and Indonesian.

=== Postal services ===
The United Nations transitional administration established an East Timor Postal Service in April 2000 with post offices opening in Dili, Baucau and at Comoro Airport. Two postage stamps with the inscription Timor Lorosae / UNTAET were first issued on 29 April 2000, in red for domestic mail and blue for international mail.

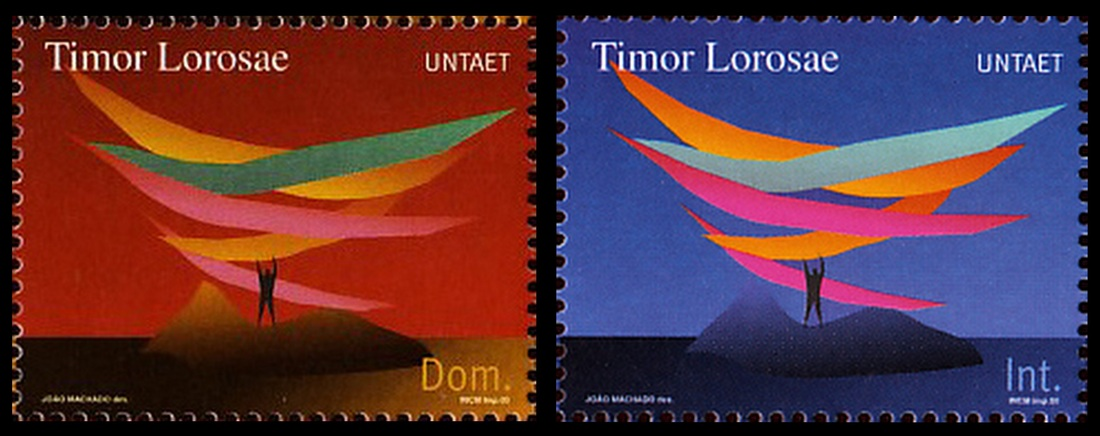
UNTAET East Timor domestic and international postage stamps

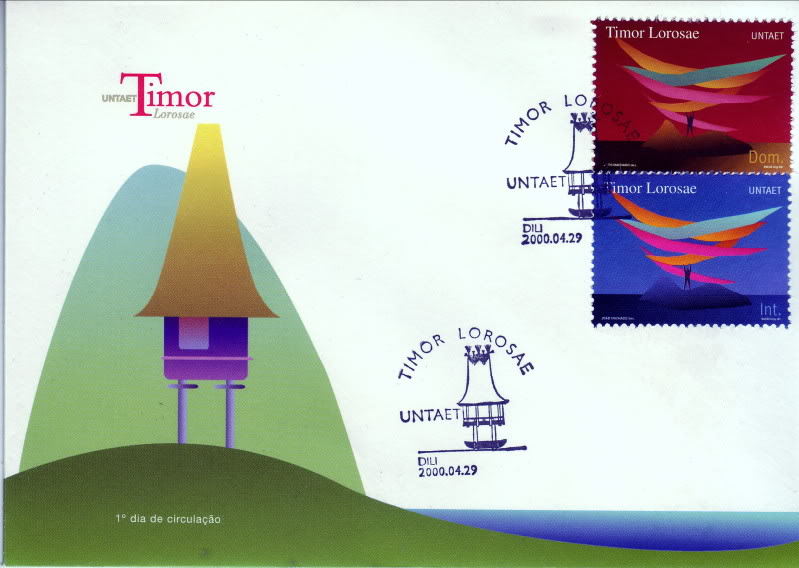
UNTAET East Timor first day cover 29 April 2000

=== Telecommunications ===
Portuguese Timor used the international dialing code +672 until 1975. During Indonesian occupation, the Indonesian country code +62 was used. The code +672 was subsequently reassigned to the Australian External Territories. Initially after the end of Indonesian occupation, the code +672 9 was used following an agreement with the Government of Australia and telecommunications provider Telstra. East Timor was later assigned the code +670.

== See also ==
- United Nations Transitional Administration in East Timor
- International Force for East Timor
- List of territories governed by the United Nations
- United Nations Administered West New Guinea
- United Nations Administered Cambodia
- United Nations Administered Kosovo
