= First cabinet of Hashim Thaçi =

Former cabinet of Kosovo

Thaçi cabinet
- Third cabinet of Kosovo
- 2 April 1999 – 1 February 2000
- Date formed: 2 April 1999
- Date dissolved: 1 February 2000

People and organisations
- Head of state: Ibrahim Rugova
- Head of government: Hashim Thaçi
- Deputy head of government: Mehmet Hajrizi
- Member parties: Kosovo Liberation Army, United Democratic Movement and other small parties
- Opposition party: Democratic League of Kosovo
- Opposition leader: Bujar Bukoshi

History
- Predecessor: Bukoshi cabinet
- Successor: Interim Administrative Council

The First Thaçi cabinet was a provisional government for the Republic of Kosova led by Prime Minister in opposition Hashim Thaçi from 2 April 1999 to 1 February 2000. The members of this government included mainly representatives from the Kosovo Liberation Army and the United Democratic Movement, while reserved seats were also allocated for the Democratic League of Kosovo, which was in exile at the time.

== History ==
The First Thaçi cabinet announced in April 1999 and formed in Rambouillet at the proposal of Madeleine Albright, the United States Secretary of State, and led by the 29-year-old Hashim Thaçi. It marked the end of the ten-year leadership of the Bukorshi cabinet and the Democratic League of Kosovo (LDK) under Ibrahim Rugova. The new government was dominated by the Kosovo Liberation Army (KLA) and the United Democratic Movement (LBD), a coalition of opposition parties led by Rexhep Qosja. While key ministries were controlled by the KLA and five ministers came from the LBD, the LDK was left without a ministerial position, as it was considered inactive due to the displacement or capture of its leadership. The formation of the cabinet was in accordance with the Rambouillet Agreement and was intended to function until new elections. Disagreements over the legitimacy of the cabinet reflected broader tensions between the KLA-LBD bloc and the LDK, which had deepened since 1998, when the LDK held elections during the ongoing conflict—an act opposed by the KLA and other groups.

Later, members from other parties joined the cabinet, including the Albanian Christian Democratic Party of Kosovo, the Democratic Union Party, the National Movement for the Liberation of Kosovo, the Party of Democratic Action, as well as representatives from the Student Union of the University of Pristina. Additionally, two members from the opposition party, the Democratic League of Kosovo also joined the cabinet.

== Composition ==
The members of the cabinet were as follows:

Cabinet members
Portfolio	Minister	Took office	Left office	Party
Original composition
Prime Minister	Hashim Thaçi	2 April 1999	1 February 2000	UÇK
Deputy Prime Ministers	Mehmet Hajrizi	2 April 1999	1 February 2000	LBD
Deputy Prime Ministers	vacant	2 April 1999	1 February 2000	LDK
Minister of Defence	Azem Syla	2 April 1999	1 February 2000	PBD
Minister of Finance	Adem Grabovci	2 April 1999	1 February 2000	UÇK
Minister of Immigration	Rifat Blaku	2 April 1999	1 February 2000	LBD
Minister of Information	Kadri Veseli	2 April 1999	1 February 2000	UÇK
Minister of Public Information	Bajram Kosumi	2 April 1999	1 February 2000	LBD
Minister for Reconstruction and Development	Jakup Krasniqi	2 April 1999	1 February 2000	LBD
Minister of Justice	Muhamet Mehmeti	2 April 1999	1 February 2000	PBD
Minister of Local Government	Ramë Buja	2 April 1999	1 February 2000	UÇK
Minister of Public Order	Rexhep Selimi	2 April 1999	1 February 2000	UÇK
Other later compositions
Minister of Agriculture	Avdyl Hoxha	2 April 1999	1 February 2000	LDK
Minister of Culture	Sabit Gashi	2 April 1999	1 February 2000	LKÇK
Minister of Education and Science	Musli Bajraktari	2 April 1999	1 February 2000	LDK
Minister of Euroatlantic Integration	Numan Balić	2 April 1999	1 February 2000	SDA
Minister of Foreign Affairs	Bardhyl Mahmuti	2 April 1999	1 February 2000	PBD
Minister of Health and Social Protection	vacant	2 April 1999	1 February 2000	none
Minister of Industry, Communications and Energy	vacant	2 April 1999	1 February 2000	none
Minister of Labour	Marte Palokaj	2 April 1999	1 February 2000	PSHDK
Minister of Youth and Sports	Bujar Dugolli	2 April 1999	1 February 2000	UPSUP
