= Cerrca =

Village in Istog, Kosovo

Cerrcë Crnce
- Village
- Location in Kosovo
- Location: Kosovo
- District: Peja
- Municipality: Istog

Population (2024)
  - Total: 1,032
- Time zone: UTC+1 (CET)
  - Summer (DST): UTC+2 (CEST)

Cerrca or Crnce (Serbian Cyrillic: Црнце) is a village in Kosovo, 2 km south of the town of Istog.

== Geography ==
This village of approximately 300 households is located in north-west Kosovo on the border with Serbia.

== Demographics ==
Except for a few exceptions, the whole population of Cerrcë are defined as Muslims of Albanian ethnicity. The inhabitants of this village speak Albanian in the Gheg dialect of the language.

== Economy ==
Crnce has approximately 766 residents of working age. Of these, 231 people describe themselves as having some sort of regular cash income. Construction work and public-sector jobs are the two greatest sources of income. The commercial agriculture and industrial sectors in Crnce have largely collapsed. Family farms are presently producing almost exclusively for their own consumption, and only two Crnce farmers report owning more than ten cows. Part of the agricultural decline is believed to be an effect of the former socialist cooperatives no longer supporting farmers with the purchase of inputs or the marketing of produce. There was a construction boom in the first few years after the war in 1999 when 90 percent of the houses in Crnce were destroyed. The largest local construction company, employing 12 people, was launched in 2000. The remainder of the private sector consists of family-run shops, taxis, and other micro-enterprises.

== Notable natives ==
- Ibrahim Rugova, former President of Kosovo.
- Naser Rugova, Kosovo member of parliament
- Selman Kadria
