= Cabinet of Bajram Rexhepi =

Former cabinet of Kosovo

Rexhepi cabinet
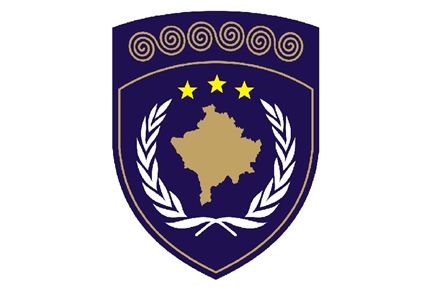
- Fifth cabinet of Kosovo
- 4 March 2002 – 3 December 2004
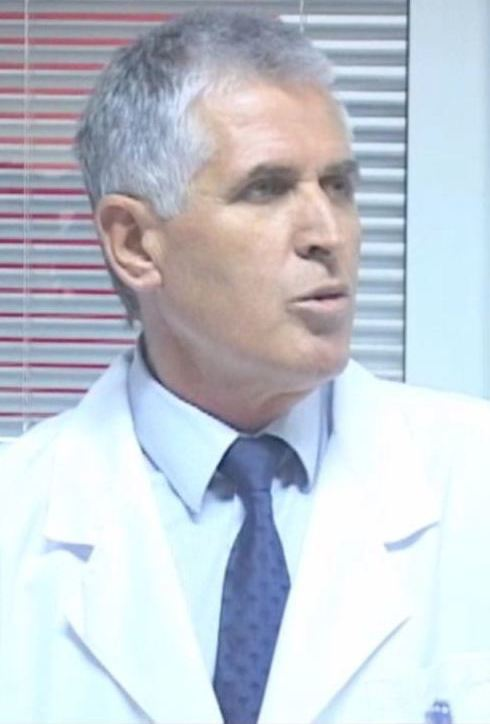
- Bajram Rexhepi
- Date formed: 4 March 2002
- Date dissolved: 3 December 2004

People and organisations
- President of Kosovo: Ibrahim Rugova
- Prime Minister of Kosovo: Bajram Rexhepi

History
- Election: 2001
- Legislature term: 1st legislature of the Assembly
- Predecessor: Interim
- Successor: First Haradinaj cabinet

The Rexhepi cabinet was the cabinet of the Provisional Institutions of Self-Government in United Nations Administered Kosovo led by Prime Minister Bajram Rexhepi between 4 March 2002 and 3 December 2004.

== Composition ==
The members of the cabinet were as follows:

Name	Party	Portfolio
Bajram Rexhepi	PDK	Prime Minister of Kosovo
Ali Sadria	LDK	Minister for Economy and Finance
Ali Jakupi	PDK	Minister for Trade and Industry
Rexhep Osmani	LDK	Minister for Education, Science and Technology
Behxhet Brajshori	LDK	Minister Culture, Youth, Sports and Non-Resident Affairs
Zef Morina	PShDK	Minister for Transport and Communications
Ahmet Jusufi	AAK	Minister for Labor and Social Welfare
Et'hem Çeku	AAK	Minister for Spatial Planning
Jakup Krasniqi	PDK	Minister for Public Services
Numan Balić	SDA	Minister for Health
		Minister of Agriculture, Forestry and Rural Development
