= Jeton Kelmendi =

Kosovar writer

Dr. Jeton Kelmendi
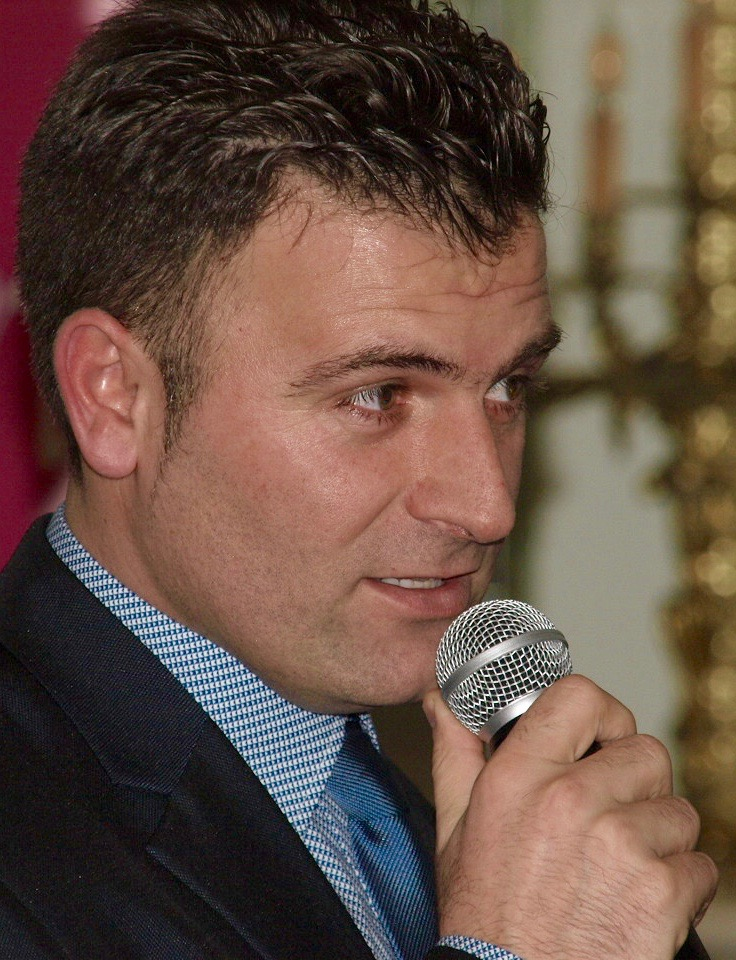
- Born: 27 November 1978 (age 47); Peja, Kosovo (then Yugoslavia)
- Education: University of Pristina; University of Brussels
- Alma mater: AAB University
- Occupation: Professor
- Children: Fjala Kelmendi, Noid Kelmendi
- Writing career
- Period: 1999–present
- Genres: Poetry, Writing
- Subject: lyrical
- Notable awards: Doctor Honoris Causa from the University Constandin Stere, Chisinau Moldova 2019.; Doctor Honoris Causa of Universidad Nacional Del Este, Paraguay 2017.; International Prize “Poet of the year 2016”, Sofly International literature foundation 2017.; International Prize “Prize of the Academy”, European Academy of Arts, Sciences and Literature, Paris 2018.; World big name in literature, Mongolia, 2020.
- Website: www.iwabogdani.org/president

Signature
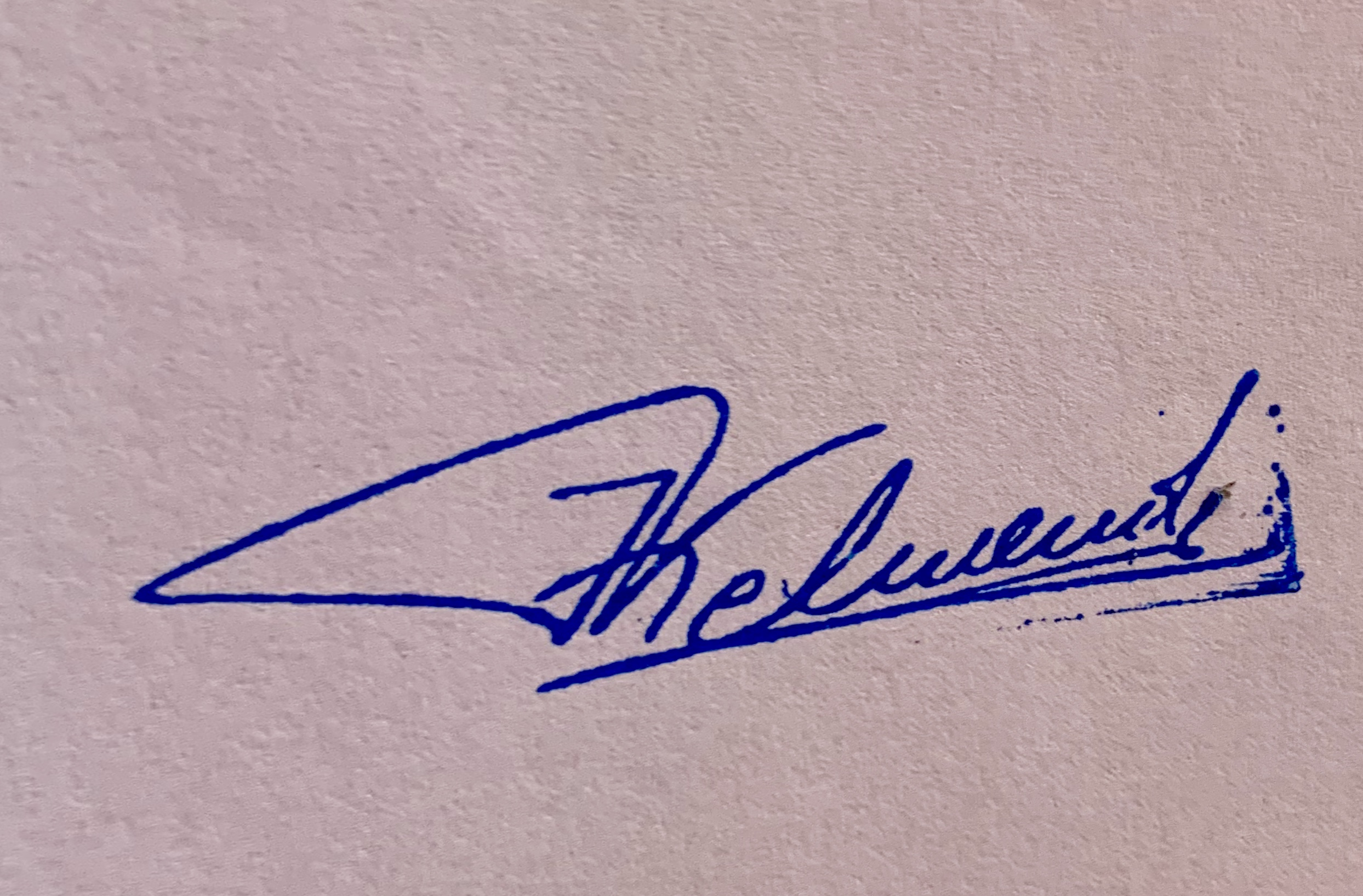

Jeton Kelmendi (born November 17, 1978 in Peja, Kosovo) is an academic, Albanian journalist, poet, translator, university professor and political analyst.

== Early career ==
Jeton Kelmendi completed elementary school in his birthplace. Later he continued his studies at the University of Pristina and received the degree of Bachelor of Arts in Mass communication. He completed his graduate studies at the Free University of Brussels, Belgium, specializing in International and Security Studies. He finished his second master's degree in diplomacy. Kelmendi did a PhD in the "Influence of media in EU Political Security Issues". He is professor at AAB University College. He is active member of the European Academy of Science and Arts in Salzburg Austria. For many years he has written poetry, prose, essays and short stories.

== Career ==
His poems are translated in more than 37 languages and published in several international literature anthologies. He is the most translated Albanian poet and well known in Europe. According to a number of literary critics, Kelmendi is the genuine representative of modern Albanian poetry. International critics and poets wrote for him a lot of article, considering him as great European poet. He is a member of many international poetry clubs and is a contributor to many literary and cultural magazines, in different Languages around the world. The wisdom of his work in the field of Literature is based in the attention that he pays to the poetic expression, modern exploration of the text and the depth of the message. His Genre is focused more on love lyrics and elliptical verse intertwined with metaphors and artistic symbolism. Currently resides and works in Brussels, Belgium and in Pristina, Kosovo.

- Jeton Kelmendi has some poems dedicated to important Albanian personalities as Mother Teresa (Living Beyond Herself), and Ibrahim Rugova (The Winter Of Great Despair).

== Published works ==
- The Century Promises (title of the original: Shekulli i Premtimeve), 1999 (poetry)
- Beyond Silence (Përtej Heshtjes), 2002 (poetry)
- If it is afternoon (Në qoftë mesditë), 2004 (poetry) ISBN 9951-06-067-6
- Fatherland pardon me (Më fal pak Atdhe), 2005 (poetry) ISBN 9951-06-098-6
- Where are the arrivals going (Ku shkojnë ardhjet), 2007 (poetry)
- You arrived for the traces of wind (Erdhe për gjurme te erës, 2008) (poetry)
- Time when it has time (Koha kurë të ketë kohë), 2009 (poetry) ISBN 978-9994344215
- Wandering thoughts (Rrugëtimi i mendimeve), 2010 poetry
- The baptize of spirit (Pagezimi I shpirtit), 2012 poetry
- I call forgotten things (Thërras gjëtar e harruara) 2013 poetry. ISBN 978-9951-02-239-2
- Another coming (Një ardhje tjetër) 2020 poetry ISBN 978-9951-764-26-1

== Published plays ==
- The Madam Word (Zonja Fjalë), 2007 (Drama) ISBN 978-1-4466-8872-4
- Play and anti-play (Lojë dhe kundër lojë), 2011 (Drama)

== Translations ==
- 1. Plagët e bukurisë by Athanase Vantchev de Thracy (France), translated from French together with Gjovalin Kola ISBN 978-99956-90-25-0
- 2. Hijet e dritës by Skënder Sherifi (Belgium), translated from French.
- 3. Gjuha e botës (International Poetry Anthology) (10 poets from 10 countries) translated from English and French.
- 4. Sheshi i shikimeve (International Poetry Anthology) (13 poets from 13 countries) translated from English.
- 5. E di kush je by Erling Kittelsen (Norwey), translated from English.
- 6. Emrimi i gjërave by Zhang Zhi Diablo (Chine), translated from English.
- 7. Vetmia e erës by Bill Wolak (USA), translated from English.
- 8. Trokas në mendjen tënde by Alicja Kuberska, Poland, translated from English.
- 9. Tingujt e Mendimeve by Lee Kuei-shien, Taiwan. Translated from English.
- 10. Kam mësuar ca gjëra by Ataol Behramoglu, Istambul. Translated from English.
- 11. Pakti im – Testament by Ernesto Kahan, Telaviv, translated from English.
- 12. Rreth dy botëve by Maria Miraglia, Italy, translated from English.
- 13. Destinacioni by Fernando Rendon (Kandidat NOBEL), translated from English.
- 14. Amplituda e probabiliteteve nga Laura Garavaglia, translated from English and French.
- 15. Rreth dy botëve, by Maria Miraglia, translated from English.
- 16. Regjister i shkruar nga domethënia by Tendai Rinos Mwanaka, translated from English.
- 17. Pyllezimi- Dystopia by Saso Ognanovski, translated from English.
- 18. Vargu i thyer (Broken string), by Maria Samiero do Barroso, translated from English.
- 19. The waight of wish by Luan Maloku, translated from Albanian to English.
- 20. I feel you so close by Luan Maloku, translated from Albanian to English.
- 21. Anthem of quiet thoughts by Bujatr Tafa, translated from Albanian to English.
- 22. Thoughts hunt the loves by Jeton Kelmendi, translated from Albanian to English.
- 23. Genocide by Ernesto Kahan and Taiko Youriko, translated from English to Albanian.
- 24. Twenty years silence by Bora Balaj, novel translated from Albanian to English.
- 25. Nuk kam kohe per enderra by Maria Miraglia, translated from English to Albanian.
- 26. Biblioteka e shpirtit by Rahim Karim Karimov, translated from English to Albanian.
- 27. Ndermjetesi i mendimeve by Erling Kittelsen, translated from English to Albanian.
- 28. Parajsa nuk eshte nje ordike by Chris Lawrence, translated from English to Albanian.
- 29. On Syndays do not call me by Lulzim Tafa, translated from Albanian to English. ISBN 978-81-8253-903-7
- 30. Mergimi dhemb by Julio Pavanetti,, translated from English to Albanian.
- 31. Himni i dashurisë by Metin Cengiz, translated from English to Albanian. ISBN 978-9951-764-54-4
- 32. Fotoja e errësirës by Umid Najjari, translated from English to Albanian.
- 33. Thirsty time by Engjell I. Berisha, translated from Albanian to English. ISBN 978-81-8253-957-0
- 34. Cdo ëndërr ofron dy pasyra by Bill Wolak, transmated from English.
- 35. Një sfinks guri by Claudia Piccinno, translated from English. ISBN 978-9951-760-59-1
- 36. Pezazhet e brendshme by Nicole Laurent-Caterice, translated from French to Albanian. ISBN 978-9951-764-71-1
- 37. Simfonia e papërfunduar by Duan Guang’an, translated from English to Albanian. ISBN 978-9951-764-69-8
- 38. Love finds itself everywhere by Jeton Kelmendi, trzanslated from Albanian to English by Jeton Kelmendi. ISBN 978-81-8253-893-1
- 39. Drita e ditëve të zakonshme by Kristine Doll, translated from English to Albanian
- 40. Autoportret i vargut by Laure Cambau, translated from French to Albanian
- 41. Lirë për tëjetur by Elisabette Bagli, translated from English to Albanian.

== Published books in foreign languages ==
1. "Ce mult s-au rãrit scrisorile" ("Sa fortë janë rralluar letrat"); published in Romanian Language.
2. "A respiration" ("Frymëmarrje"); published in India
3. "Dame parol," drama; published in French
4. "Comme le commencement est silencieux" ("When start the silence"), poetry; Paris, France poetry; Paris, France
5. "ΠΟΥ ΠΑΝΕ ΟΙ ΕΡΧΟΜΟΙ ("Where go the comings"), Poetry in Greek; Greece
6. "Wie wollen ("Si me dashtë"), poetry; Germany
7. Frau Wort (Miss word) drama Germany.
8. A Palavra Evitou o Silêncio/(Words cross the silence) 2009, Brazil
9. Nasil sevmeli (Si me dashtë) poetry Turkey
10. НА ВЕРХІВ’Ї ЧАСУ (In the beginning of time) poetry Ukraine.
11. How to reach yourself Poetry in USA ISBN 978-1-4478-3827-2
12. в зените времени истлевшего (A vers on top of the time gone) Poetry Russia ISBN 978-966-1642-98-9
13. 34首封面 (34 poemus) poetry China. ISBN 978-0-9637599-6-2
14. "فواصل للحذف " (Elliptical dots) Poetry in Egypt. ISBN 978-977-283-390-0
15. Pensamientos del Alma (Thoughts of the spirit), poetry Spain 2014.
16. Xewnên di dîwêr de (How to love) poetry Kudristan-Turkey 2015
17. Cómo Llegar A Ti Mismo (How to love) poetry Argentina 2015
18. Com Retrobar-Se (How to love) poetry Catalonia 2015
19. Prescurtarea departarilor (Shortening distances), poetry Romania, 2016
20. Rănile cuvântului (Plagët e fjalës) poetry Moldavia 2018 ISBN 978-9975-59-163-8
21. 思想狩獵愛 (Thoughts Hunt the Loves) poetry Taiwan 2018.
22. wybrane wiersze (Selected poems) Poetry in Polish, Poland 2018.
23. Düsünceye götüren misralar (How to know) Turkish Turkey 2018.
24. ДИВЉА ЋУТАЊА (Wild silence) Serbian, Serbia Belgrade 2018.
25. Daba Ljubavi (Eatg of love) Montenegrin, Montenegro Podgorica 2018.
26. Cудбински простор (destiny space) poetry, Macedonia 2018.
27. Tra realtà e sogno (Between the reality and dreams) Italy 2019. ISBN 978-88-99224-48-6
28. Čas ljubezni (Love moments) Slovenia, 2019. ISBN 978-961-94524-8-6
29. Savaş zamaninda eşq (Love in war time) Azerbaijan 2019.
30. Keserü kávé (Bitter coffee), Hungarian, Budapest, 2019.
31. Pfungua dzinovhima vadiwa, (Thoughts Hunt the Loves), Shona, mangiage, Zimbabwe 2019.
32. Antidrom (Antidream), Norwegian Oslo 2019. ISBN 978-82-560-2146-8
33. L’Age mythique (Age mythic) Paris 2020. ISBN 978-2-343-19440-0
34. Hayat İçimde Yaşıyor (Life lives in me) Istambul Turkey 2021. ISBN 978-605-7513-54-0
35. La vida vive en mí (Life lives in me) Spanish 2021.
36. Prescurtarea depărtărilor (Abbreviation of distances) Craiova Romania 2021.
37. Cinta di musim perang (Love in war time) Malaysia 2021.
38. 爱无处不在 (Love is everywhere) China 2021.
39. вдали от себя (away from myself) Saint Petersburg Russia 2021. ISBN 978-5-91844-197-8
40. Nella casa dell’ anima (in the house of the soul) Taranto Italy 2021. ISBN 978-88-33873-74-9
41. Love finds itself everywhere (India) 2022.
42. Tvoje Ďaleké Zore (Your far zone) Bratislava, Slovakia 2022.
43. La vida vive en mí (Life lives on me), Columbia 2022.
44. אהבה מוצאת עצמה בכל מקום (Love finds itself everywhere) Tel Aviv Israel 2023.

== Political science ==
- I. EU mission in Kosova after its independence 2010 USA.
- II. Bad times for the knowledge 2011, Pristina Kosovo.
- III. NATO-EU missions, cooperative or competitive 2012, Tirana Albania.
- IV. Media Influence in Security Politics in EU, 2016, Brussels, Belgium.
- V. Media influence in Kosovo change politics 2022, Pristina Kosovo.
- VI. Patching the hopes of citizens, publicistica 2023, Pristina Kosovo. ISBN 978-9951-764-74-2
- -- Books together with other authors:
- 1. Conceptualising Indian Writing in English by Vinod Bhatt, Dev Brat Gupta and Jeton Kelmendi. 2022, Pristina Kosovo. ISBN 978-9951-764-72-8
- 2. An Insight on English Language Teaching by Dev Brat Giupta, Vinod Bhatt and Jeton Kelmendi, published 2023, Pristina Kosovo. ISBN 978-9951-764-77-3
- 3. A perspective on English Language Teaching by Vinod Bhatt, Jeton Kelmendi and Dev Brat Gupta, published 2023, Pristina Kosovo. ISBN 978-9951-764-78-0
- 4. Culture experimentation in literary writing by Dev Brat, Vinod Bhatt and Jeton Kelmendi, published 2023, Pristina Kosovo. ISBN 978-9951-764-79-7
- 5. Literature and gender by Jeton Kelmendi, Dev Brat Gupta and Vinad Bhatt, published 2023, Pristina Kosovo. ISBN 978-9951-764-80-3

== International awards ==
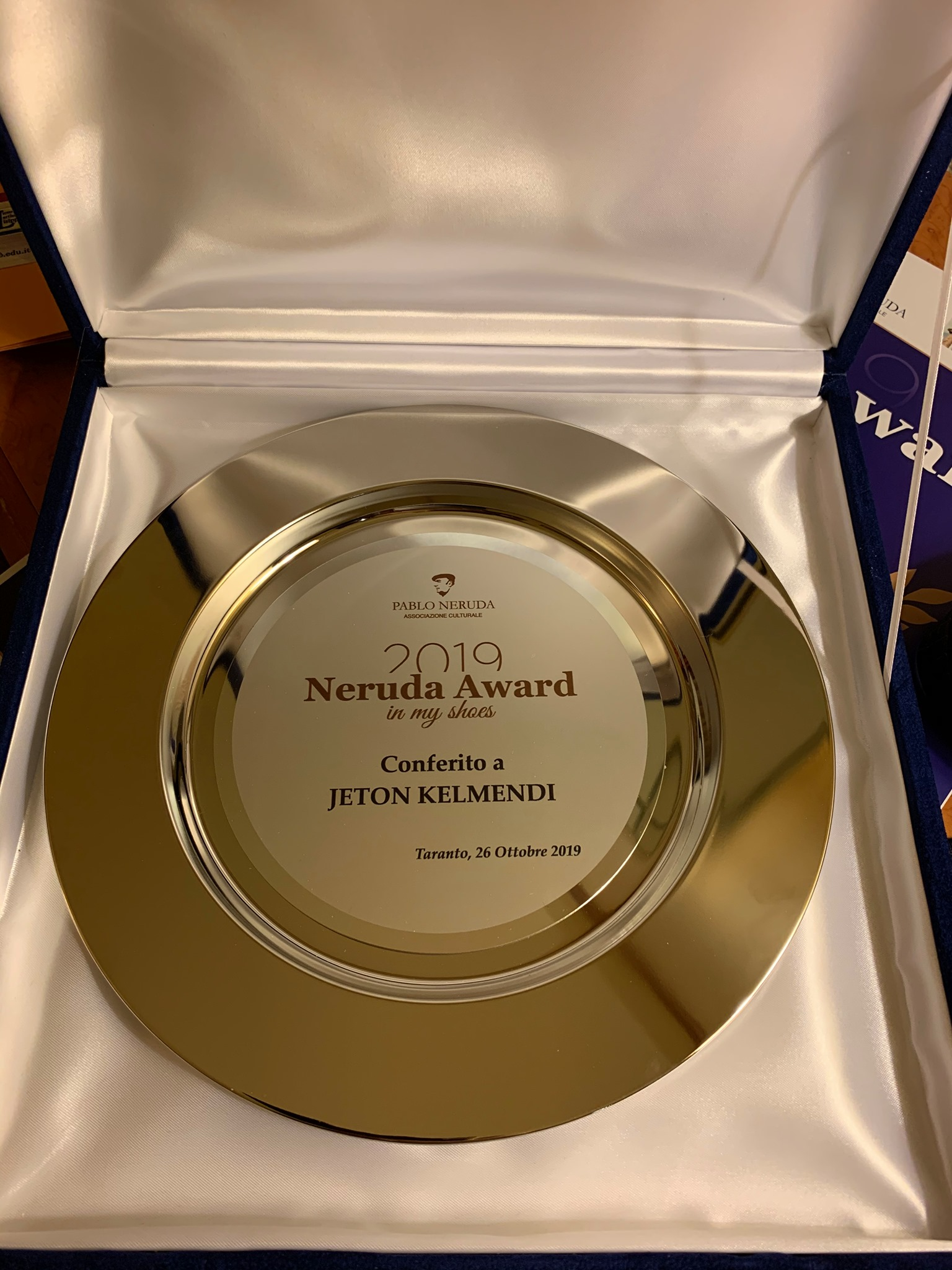
Neruda Awards

- I. Doctor Honoris Causa of the Institute of Ukrainian and Caucasian studies at the Ukrainian Academy of Sciences 2012.
- II. Doctor Honoris Causa of Universidad Nacional Del Este, Paraguay 2017.
- III. SOLENZARA Prestigious International Award, Paris, France 2010.
- IV. International Prize "Nikolaj Gogol" Ukraine 2013.
- V. International Prize "Alexander the Great" Greece 2013
- VI. National Poetry book prize MITINGU, in Gjakova, Kosovo 2011.
- VII. International Prize "World Poetry" third prize in Sarajevo, Bosnia and Herzegovina 2013.
- VIII. "Translator of the year 2013", in China 2013.
- IX. International Prize "Mather Teresa" for humanity in poetry, Gjakova Kosovo. 2013
- X. International Prize "Ludwig Nobel" of Udmurtian PEN Club, Udmurtu, Russia 2014
- XI. International Prize "Mihai Eminescu" Romania, 2016
- XII. International Prize "Soflay Poet of the year 2016", Soflay International Literary Foundation & Soflayinc, 2017.
- XIII International Prize "World Icon for Peace", from the World Institute for Peace, Nigeria, 2017.
- XIV. International Prize "World Literature", in Kazakhstan, 2017.
- XV. Ambassador of Peace by the World Institute for Peace. 2017.
- XVI. International Prize "Prize of the Academy", European Academy of Arts, Sciences and Literature, Paris 2018.
- XVII. International "Matthew Arnold Award", India 2018.
- XVIII. International Prize "Special Ganadores del concurso", Bolivia 2019.
- XVIX. Doctor Honoris Causa from the University Constandin Stere, Chisinau Moldova 2019.
- XX. International Neruda Awards, Taranto Italy 2019.
- XXI. World big name in literature, Mongolia, 2020.
- XXII. Doctor Honoris Causa from Theoligical Institute mission the Last Trumpet, Brazil
- XXIII Doctor Honoris Causa from the Institute for the European Roma Studies and Researcher in Belgrade, Serbia, 2020.
- XXIV Doctor Honoris Causa from Theoligical Institute mission the Last Trumpet, Brasil 2020.
- ‘XXV Great Personality Award 2020’ from World International Forum for Peace, India 2020.
- XXVI Prize the best poetry book 2020, Kosovo 2020.
- XXVII International prize “Henrich boll” Germany 2022.
- XXVIII International First prize Dante Aligeri, Rome Italy 2022.

== International Membership ==
- Member of the Academy of Science and Arts of Europe, Salsburg, Austria.
- Member of the World Academy of Art and Culture, California, USA.
- Member of the Association of Professional Journalists of Europe, Brussels, Belgium.
- Member of the Academy of Science, Arts and Literature of Europe, Paris, France.
- Member of the Academy of Science and High Education of Ukraine, Kyiv, Ukraine.
- Member of International PEN club Belgian Francophone, Brussels Belgium.
- Honorary member of Academy Internacional "Mihai Eminescu", Romania.
- Member of Euro-Azia Writers Union, Turkey.
- Member of the Soflay Literary Foundation & Soflayinc, Mexico.

== Bibliography ==
- Dr. Irena Gjoni, Poeti shqiptar, Studies on the Creativity of Jeton Kelmendi ISBN 978-99943-0-342-7
- Acad. Constantin Barbu, Codul meu pentru mâine (My code for tomorrow) ISBN 978-606-41-2107-3

== Reviews ==
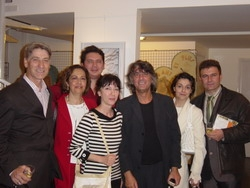
International writers in Paris 2008 Vladimir Lesovoy, Russia; Clara Maria Gonzales de Urbina, Columbia; François Szabo, France; Ioana Trică, România; Yvan Tetelbom, France, Jeton Kelmendi Kosovo

- "Jeton Kelmendi's name in poetry is the part that gives meaning to this art, while the poetry of this European author is large and very dimensional. The poet Kelmendi has so much power to introduce you into his poetic art that he creates the conviction that his words are alive and you cannot leave reading".

Prof. Ernesto Kahan, Professor Emeritus, Israel NOBEL Peace Prize 1985

- "Prefers to better propagate within his heart than in the exotic exterior world, filtering the intuition behind his characters. Again, his instant art is amazing the skill that uses. His poems often summarized several times in a few words. This is touching, due to its concerns and shortcomings." Acad. Athanase Vantchev de Thracym, France
- "With inspiring flowers, and the words flow easily translated, he has literary persistent effects, which can be found in this volume. Jeton Kelmendi leads us in the twenty-first century, with a name that is becoming greater." Christopher Lawrence, England
- "Our author has the ability to move through different times: long distance, ancient, not so far, present and future. This is probably his strength about what he presents before the cosmopolitan readers." Prof. Dr. RICHARD A. BROSIO, University of Michigan, Professor Emeritus, USA
