= Ag Apolloni =

Albanian writer

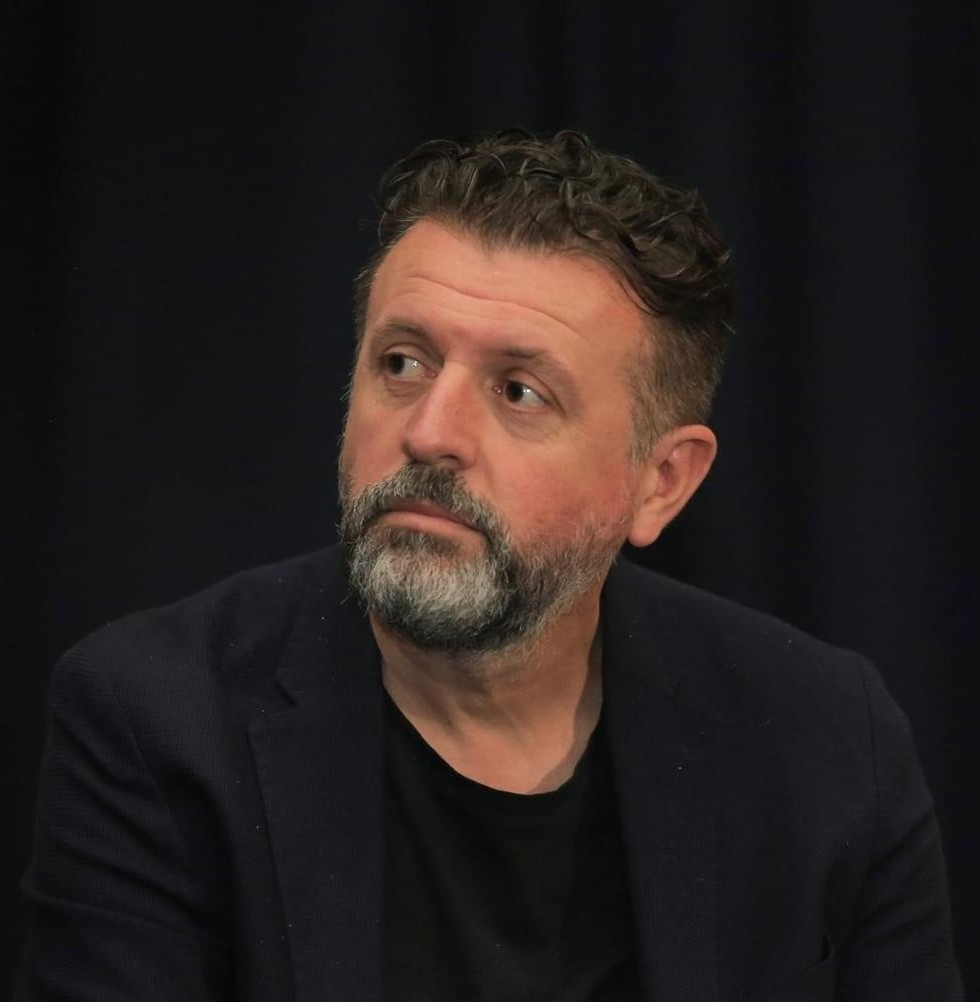
- Ag Apolloni
- Born: 13 June 1982 (age 44); Kačanik, SAP Kosovo, Yugoslavia (modern Kosovo)
- Citizenship: Kosovo; Albania
- Education: University of Pristina
- Occupations: Novelist; poet; essayist; playwright
- Writing career
- Period: 2003–present
- Notable works: Glimmer of Hope, Glimmer of Flame (2020); Red Riding-Hood: A Fairy-Tale for Grown Ups (2022)

Ag Apolloni (Albanian pronunciation: [ag apo'ɫoni]; born 13 June 1982) is an Albanian writer, poet, playwright, essayist, and scholar. He is a professor at the University of Prishtina, Kosovo. His prose often incorporates dramatic elements and philosophical inquiry.

== Early life ==
Ag Apolloni was born on 13 June 1982 in Kaçanik, Kosovo. He completed both elementary school and gymnasium in his hometown. In 2005, he completed his studies in Department of Dramatic Arts at the Faculty of Arts and in Literature at the Faculty of Philology, both at the University of Prishtina. In 2008, he earned a Master of Philological Sciences degree from the same university, while in 2012 he earned the title Doctor of Philological Sciences.

In 2020 he was granted citizenship of Albania.

== Career ==
=== Academic career ===
Since 2008, Ag Apolloni has taught at the University of Prishtina. In 2024, he was invited as a guest lecturer at Charles University in Prague, Czech Republic, where he delivered a series of lectures. In 2025, he was invited as a visiting scholar at Harvard University in Cambridge, Massachusetts.

=== Journalism ===
Apolloni has worked as a journalist, editor, and editor-in-chief for several daily newspapers as well as literary and cultural journals based in Pristina. In 2010, he reactivated Jeta e Re (New Life), the oldest literary journal in Kosovo, originally founded in 1949 and discontinued in 2006. He directed the magazine for three years.

In 2013, Apolloni founded the cultural journal Symbol, through which he conducted interviews with writers, scholars, and artists. His interviews have included Linda Hutcheon, Jonathan Culler, Rita Dove, Gottfried Helnwein, Andreas Huyssen, Mieke Bal, DM Thomas, Javier Cercas, Ann Jefferson, Peter Singer, Stephen Greenblatt, Stanley Fish, David Damrosch, and John Kerrigan. He directed the journal until 2023 and has collaborated with various newspapers and literary journals.

=== Publishing ===
In 2012, in Pristina, he co-founded the publishing house OM, which he directed until early 2019, when he founded Bard Books, which he led until 2024. Through these publishing houses, he edited and published approximately two hundred books, including curated selections of authors. He also established a series dedicated to the publication of women authors and oversaw the publication of the complete works of the Greek author Nikos Kazantzakis and the Serbian author Danilo Kiš. He organized numerous book launches in Kosovo, Albania, and North Macedonia presenting authors published by these publishing houses.

=== Writing career ===
Apolloni began writing regularly in 2003, when he started a poetic diary titled Zomb and wrote the monodrama The Story of an Eyes Collector. The play was first published in literary journals in Kosovo in 2006 and 2009, later included in a 2010 volume alongside three of his other plays, and subsequently featured in the Austrian literary magazine Lichtungen.

Apolloni's literary works include plays, poetry, prose, and academic studies. His works have been translated into several languages, including English, French, Dutch, German, Czech, Romanian, Slovenian, Macedonian, Montenegrin, Greek, and Lithuanian. He has received multiple national and international awards for both his literary and scholarly contributions.

=== Essays and public writing ===
In addition to his literary and academic work, Apolloni has written essays on cultural, educational, and social issues, including "We Kill in the Name of God" and "Letter to an Absent Friend", addressing themes of religious radicalism and interethnic relations in the Balkans.

== Literary works ==
=== Novels ===
Apolloni’s first novel, The Howl of the Wolf (2013), explores themes including the relationship between the living and the dead. It incorporates references to music, painting, film, and theatre, and is set across several countries, including Kosovo, North Macedonia, Albania, Montenegro, Italy, and Austria. The novel was well received.

His second novel, Zazen (2014), follows a young Kosovar returning home after studying philosophy abroad and confronting social alienation. The novel addresses social, philosophical, political, national, and religious themes.

My Middle Ages (2019) is a collection of autobiographical essays, described as a narrative-essayist autobiography and roman à clef. The book comprises ten essays, each titled in Latin: Obscura, Vulgus, Doctrina, Pelegrin, Allegoria, Persona, Schisma, Templarius, Inquisitio, and Memento. The essays reflect on the author's personal experiences while also addressing contemporary social and cultural issues in Kosovo.

In 2020, he published Glimmer of Hope, Glimmer of Flame, a narrative centered on two women from Gjakova, Kosovo, affected by the aftermath of the 1999 war. The novel was awarded the Novel of the Year prize by the Ministry of Culture of Kosovo, has been translated into several languages, and was staged in a theatre in Athens. It was also presented in The Hague on the fifteenth anniversary of Kosovo’s independence, and at various book fairs and literary events in Europe and the United States.

Red Riding Hood: Fairytale for Grown Ups (2022) reinterprets the tale of Little Red Riding Hood, combining prose, poetry, and drama with documentary elements. It was published in Albania and Kosovo. The work received a Special Mention in the EU Prize for Literature. On 23 April 2026, it was discussed at Harvard University in a public conversation between the author and folklorist Maria Tatar.

If I Were a Devil (2024), is an autofiction that draws on intertextual references to classical and modern literature, including Plautus’ Menaechmi, Shakespeare’s Twelfth Night, Goethe’s Faust, and blues music as well. It was written between 2023 and 2024 in Vienna and Bucharest.

=== Plays ===
Apolloni's dramatic work The Story of an Eyes Collector, Halloween, Judith, Mat (2010) is a collection of three tragedies that draw inspiration from ancient Greek drama and classical theatre. He began writing the plays at the age of 21, referring to the work as "an elegy for the last decade of the last century, namely a reminder of the crimes that shocked the world."

Hamlet according to Horatio is a psychoanalytic tragedy that incorporates Sigmund Freud’s theories to propose an alternative narrative to Shakespeare’s Hamlet. The play explores themes such as incest and betrayal and is structured as a pastiche or dramatic hypertext based on Shakespeare’s original work and Freud’s interpretation of Hamlet as an incomplete Oedipus figure. Thematically, the play echoes elements from Oresteia, Oedipus Rex, and Hamlet. The drama was called My Hamlet as a working title, and was the winner of the annual "Katarina Josipi" Drama Award.

Scanderbeg: Marlowe's Manuscript is a postmodern drama based on the fictional discovery of a lost Elizabethan play, The True History of George Scanderbeg, attributed to Christopher Marlowe. The play is written according to the postmodern principle of the manuscript-as-text, blending historical speculation with literary reconstruction.

The Revenge of Homer, published in 2025, was written in 2011 at the request of the National Theatre of Kosovo, as an adaptation of Ismail Kadare’s novel The File on H. It was staged that same year, and again the following year, at the National Theatre of Kosovo and the National Theatre of Albania. More than a conventional dramatization, the play functions as a burlesque of a serious subject — a dramatic hypertext with intertextual links to Balkan folklore, Homer, and Bram Stoker.

=== Poetry ===
In 2009, Apolloni published Zomb, a collection described as a diary of 100 of his poems. The book opens with a dedication titled "My Friend's Wife," which includes two epigraphs from English poet John Milton. It is divided into six sections: Overture, Edenic Waltz, Dionysian Sonata, Siren Symphony, Requiem Eros, and Coda. Zomb explores erotic themes and draws on a wide range of influences, including medieval madrigals, Western musical traditions, world cinema, literature from antiquity to the contemporary period, and various religious systems such as Buddhism, Totemism, Judaism, Christianity, and Islam.

The Sandals of Seneca (2020) is a poetry collection written following the author’s travels to historical and cultural sites in Greece, Italy, France, Austria, and Germany. The opening poem reflects on the death of the Roman philosopher Seneca, drawing parallels between ancient political corruption and contemporary politics in Kosovo.

The Rhetoric of Silence (2021) is a chapbook composed of eighteen poems centered on the theme of love.

Notes from the Cave (2023) is a collection of poems addressing themes such as politics, ethics, the meaning of life, and love. The opening poem, "The Heresy of Heraclites," connects the despair of the ancient Greek philosopher with the existential concerns of a modern Kosovar intellectual.

== Literary criticism ==
In addition to his fiction, Apolloni has written several works of literary criticism and theory. He has published two monographs: Postmodern Parable (2010), based on his master’s thesis, is a study of Rexhep Qosja, considered the first postmodern Albanian writer; and The Paradigm of Proteus (2012), based on his doctoral dissertation, is a study of Ismail Kadare’s The General of the Dead Army, the most widely translated Albanian novel.

In 2016, he published Konica’s Suitcase, a collection of essays addressing various aspects of Albanian literature, including language, literary value, major authors, and key works. In 2019, he released Commentum, a multi-volume critical project in which he discusses the works of Aristotle, Friedrich Nietzsche, Bertolt Brecht, Nikos Kazantzakis, Miguel de Unamuno, Jorge Luis Borges, Ernesto Sabato, Cesare Pavese, Umberto Eco, and others.

In 2025, Apolloni published The Prague Lectures, a book that includes the lectures he delivered at Charles University, where he discussed World Literature and writers such as Goethe, Paul Valéry, Joseph Conrad, Franz Kafka, and others.

== Reception ==
The reception of Apolloni’s fiction has been discussed by several literary critics, scholars, and academics. Dutch literary theorist Mieke Bal (University of Amsterdam) described Glimmer of Hope, Glimmer of Flame as: "A docu-novel that narrates the horrors of war, staying close to the experiences of the victims and yet avoiding excessive pathos: this is Ag Apolloni’s gift to the world. It is a literary masterpiece worth being turned into a film." Czech critic Julie Ginzberg described Apolloni as “no conformist at all,” stating that “his critical pen spares no one.” Professor Zdeněk Svoboda described the novel The Howl of the Wolf as a complex and challenging work requiring attentive reading, adding that it is “rooted in the contemporary world and open to dialogue.”

== Awards and recognition ==
- 2010 – Poetry Book of the Year, Ministry of Culture, Kosovo, for Zomb.
- 2013 – Critical Book of the Year, Ministry of Culture, Kosovo, for The Paradigm of Proteus.
- 2013 – Novel of the Year, Koha Group, Kosovo, for The Howl of the Wolf.
- 2017 – Play of the Year, National Theatre of Kosovo, for Hamlet according to Horatio.
- 2021 – Novel of the Year, Ministry of Culture, Kosovo, for Glimmer of Hope, Glimmer of Flame.
- 2023 – Special Mention, European Union Prize for Literature, for Red Riding Hood: Fairytale for Grown Ups.

== Bibliography ==
=== Novels ===
- The Howl of the Wolf (Ulurima e ujkut), (2013)
- Zazen (2014)
- Glimmer of hope, glimmer of flame (Një fije shprese, një fije shkrepëse), (2020)
- Red Riding Hood, Fairytale for Grown Ups (Kësulëkuqja, përrallë për të rritur), (2022)
- If I Were a Devil (Sikur t’isha djall), (2024)

=== Poetry ===
- Zomb (2009)
- The Sandals of Seneca (Sandalet e Senekës), (2020)
- The Rhetoric of Silence (Retorika e heshtjes), (2021)
- Notes from the Cave (Shënime nga shpella), (2023)

=== Plays ===
- The Story of An Eyes Collector, Halloween, Judith, Mat, (2010)
- Hamlet according to Horatio (Hamleti simbas Horacit), (2017)
- Skanderbeg: Manuscript of Marlowe (Skenderbeu, manuskripti i Marlout), (2018)
- The Revenge of Homer (Hakmarrja e Homerit), (2025)

=== Studies, essays ===
- The Postmodern Parable (Parabola postmoderne), (2010)
- The Paradigm of Proteus (Paradigma e Proteut), (2012)
- Konitza's Suitcase (Koferi i Konicës), (2016)
- Commentum (2019)
- The Prague Lectures: Ten Talks on World Literature (Predikimet e Pragës: dhjetë ligjërata mbi letërsinë botërore), (2025)

=== Autobiography ===
- My Middle Age(s) (Mesjeta ime), (2019)
