= Selman Kadria =

Selman Kadri Hasanaj
- Born: 1906; Cerrca, Vilayet of Kosovo, Ottoman Empire
- Died: 1938 (aged 31–32); Istok, Kingdom of Yugoslavia

Selman Kadri Hasanaj (1906–1938), known as Selman Kadria, was an ethnic Albanian Hero from the village of Cerrca in Istog, present-day Kosovo. He was linked with the Albanian independence movement in Kosovo. In 1938, he killed the Yugoslav Serbian Chetnik vojvoda (captain), Milić Krstić (known as Miliç Kërrsta in Albanian) for his repressive measures against local Albanians. A few months later, he was himself killed. Numerous folk songs have been composed for his deed. His tomb in Cerrca has become a monument and in June 2019, the constitutional process for him to be named Hero of Kosovo began, and later on he was named Hero by the state.

== Life and family ==
Selman Kadria was born in the village of Cerrcë, near Istok, Ottoman Empire. His father was Kadri Feriz Hasanaj and his mother was Fatime from the nearby village of Moistir. He was born in a poor family and was farmer, land worker.He married Zojë Blakaj from the nearby village of Vrella. He had one son, Jashar and two daughters, Shkurte and Rroshe. His son was three years old when Kadria was killed. Jashar Selman Hasanaj had five sons and two daughters. Most of his descendants live in the US except one son.

== Assassination of Milić Krstić and death ==
After World War I, Istok became part of the Kingdom of Yugoslavia. Life for local Albanians was harsh in this period as the new Yugoslav, predominantly Serbian administration engaged in extensive repressive measures against them. The situation further deteriorated when the Yugoslav colonization of Kosovo began. The Yugoslav gendarmerie and Chetnik paramilitary formations were the main organizer of these repressive measures at the local level. Milić Krstić was a Chetnik vojvoda (captain) who led such a paramilitary formation in Istok. Selman Kadria occasionally worked as a land worker for Krstić, who had become a wealthy landowner through his connections to the state apparatus.

Kadria's assassination of Krstić was part of a larger plan of the Albanian independence movement in Kosovo. Interviews of local witnesses by historians many years after the events, have so far revealed that Kadria acted together with his close friends, folk singers Brahim Ukë Kabashi and Ali Kabashi (in other accounts Brahim Rexhaj is named as the third associate). They had three targets: Milić Krstić, Arsen Perović and Arsen Ćirić. In the original plan, Kadria was to kill Perović and Brahim Kabashi was to kill Krstić, but they switched targets because it made it easier to approach the targets as the would-be assassins in the revised plan were active in the same villages as the would-be targets.

After the killings, the three men would meet in the mountainous location Çarrista e Januzajve and then would cross the Yugoslavia-Albania border outside the reach of the Yugoslav gendarmerie. Of the three, only Selman Kadria carried out the plan. It remains unclear why the other two men never put forward the plan. In some accounts, they have been accused of abandoning it and in others, it is mentioned that they were captured immediately after Krstić's assassination and had no time to execute it.

The details of the act itself remain unclear, but what is known is that it took place at the banks of the Istok River possibly during a fishing activity and that Kadria used Krstić's own weapon to kill him. In oral history and songs, many versions of the final dialogue between the two have been produced which mainly focus on themes of revenge. The location of the event to this day is known as Pusi i Miliqit. After the killing, Kadria hid in the mountainous location according to the plan. The Yugoslav gendarmerie found the body two days later and immediately began a search to find Kadria. After some time in the mountains, Kadria contacted his mother's uncle Ramë Vuthi to assist him with crossing into Albania. Ramë Vuthi was to provide him with a horse and supplies, but he betrayed Kadria and mortally wounded and surrendered him to the gendarmerie. The officers wanted to interrogate him in order to find if his actions were part of a larger plan. Kadria, however, bled out and died by the time they arrived in the Serbian Orthodox churchyard of Istok.

== Aftermath and legacy ==
Some time later, the cousins of Kadria, Niman Bekë Hasanaj and Hasan Zeqë Hasanaj took revenge and killed Ramë Vuthi. They were jailed for their actions. Ramë Vuthi was buried without a funeral because the village imam refused to attend the ceremony.

Numerous folk songs have been composed for the actions of Selman Kadria. One the better known ones is "Këngë për Selman Kadriun". It is usually accompanied by Çifteli and sharki. The tomb of Kadria has become a local monument over the years. It has been vandalized twice by Serb nationalists. In June 2019, Bekë Berisha, a representative in the Kosovan parliament, proposed to Prime Minister Ramush Haradinaj that Kadria should be named Hero of Kosovo. Haradinaj accepted the proposition and began the nomination process for the decoration. On July 12, 2019, Artan Hasanaj(Jashar's son) accepted the Hero of Kosovo award in Istok from Bekë Berisha.
