= Naser Rugova =

Kosovar politician

Naser Rugova is a Deputy of the Kosovo Assembly. He was born in 1970 in Crnce, Socialist Federal Republic of Yugoslavia. He is a member of the Democratic League of Kosovo.
