= Rada Trajković =

Serbian politician (born 1953)

- Рада Трајковић
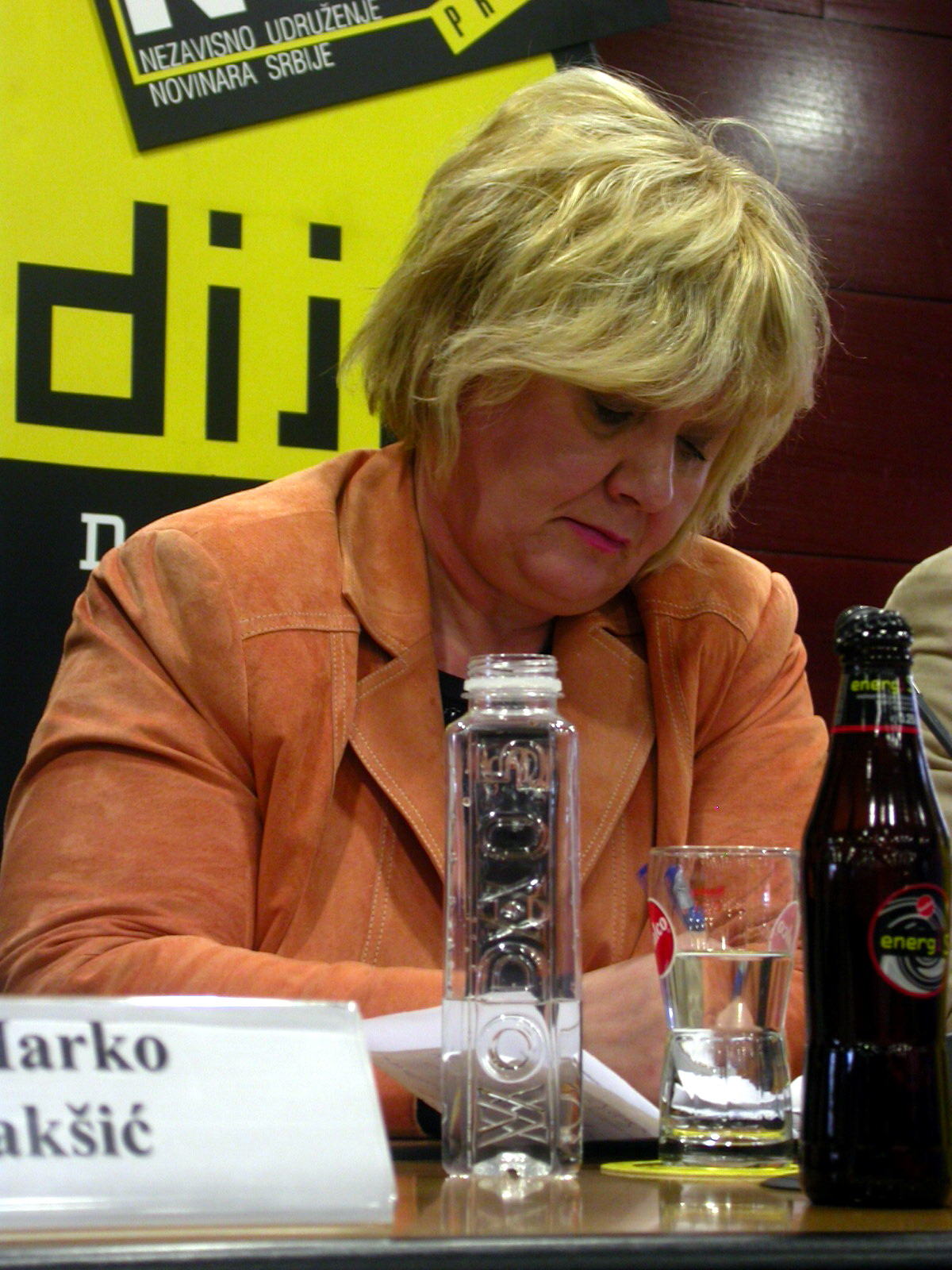
- Rada Trajković, 2012

Representative in the Interim Administrative Council of Kosovo
- In office 15 December 1999 – 4 March 2002 Serving with Hashim Thaçi, Ibrahim Rugova and Rexhep Qosja
- SRSG: Bernard Kouchner; Hans Hækkerup
- Preceded by: Office established
- Succeeded by: Office abolished

Minister of Family Services of Serbia
- In office 24 March 1998 – 24 October 2000
- President: Milan Milutinović
- Prime Minister: Mirko Marjanović
- Preceded by: Office established
- Succeeded by: Slavica Đukić Dejanović

Personal details
- Born: Rada Vujačić; 8 March 1953 (age 73) Podujevo, PR Serbia, FPR Yugoslavia (present-day Podujevë, Kosovo)
- Party: European Movement of Serbs from Kosovo and Metohija
- Other political affiliations: GI SPO (2021); Return Coalition (2001–2004); Radical Party (1991–2000)
- Spouse: Veselin Trajković
- Education: University of Priština

Rada Trajković (née Vujačić; Serbian Cyrillic: Рада Трајковић, née Вујачић; born 8 March 1953) is a Kosovo Serb politician, president of the European Movement of Serbs from Kosovo and Metohija who served as the Minister of Family Services in the Government of Serbia and the second cabinet of Mirko Marjanović from 24 March 1998 to 24 October 2000.

== Biography ==
=== Early life and career ===
Rada Trajković was born as Rada Vujačić to a Kosovo Serb family on 8 March 1953, in Podujevë. Her father Mato was a merchant and is of Montenegrin Serb heritage, while her mother Radojka was a housewife. She has a brother Radomir.

She finished elementary school in Podujevo. After high school, she enrolled in mathematics studies, but after marrying Veselin Trajković, she transferred to the Faculty of Medicine at the University of Priština. When she graduated, she got a job at the Oral Clinic at the Clinical Hospital Center in Pristina. After specialization, she became the head of the Laryngology Department. She received her doctorate in early detection of throat cancer.

=== Political career ===
The general public learned about Trajković in 1985–86 during the alleged mass poisoning of Kosovo Albanians, when she told the domestic and international public that it was a fraud. She raised media attention for the second time after her conflict with the president of the Serbian Radical Party, Vojislav Šešelj. A member of that party was her husband, and she was a sympathizer of the same for a long time. In the end, she joined the Serbian Radical Party and as its member she was elected a Member of the Federal Assembly of FR Yugoslavia, and in 1998 was named Minister of Family Services in the second cabinet of Mirko Marjanović. After the Kosovo War, on 14 June 1999, Trajković resigned from her position, but continued to perform her duties until 24 October 2000 and she entered the Serbian National Council and served as the Serbian observer in the Provisional Executive Council of Bernard Kouchner.

After the first post-war Kosovan parliamentary elections in 2001, Trajković was elected a member of the Assembly of Kosovo as a representative of the "Return" coalition and served from 2001 to 2004.

She is currently the president of the political organization called the European Movement of Serbs from Kosovo and Metohija and a professor at the Faculty of Medicine at the University of Priština in North Mitrovica.
