= Interim Administrative Council =

United Nations-established interim cabinet for Kosovo

- Fourth cabinet of Kosovo
- 15 December 1999 – 4 March 2002
- Date formed: 15 December 1999
- Date dissolved: 4 March 2002

People and organisations
- SRSG: Bernard Kouchner; Hans Hækkerup
- Representatives: Hashim Thaçi; Ibrahim Rugova; Rexhep Qosja; Rada Trajković

History
- Predecessor: First Thaçi cabinet
- Successor: Rexhepi cabinet

The Interim Administrative Council (IAC) (Albanian: Këshilli i Përkohshëm Administrativ, Serbian: Привремени управни савет) was a provisional government for United Nations Administered Kosovo, established on 15 December 1999 by the United Nations Interim Administration Mission in Kosovo (UNMIK) as part of the Joint Interim Administrative Structure (JIAS). Its purpose was to advise the Special Representative of the Secretary-General on policies related to other JIAS bodies. It was composed of 10 members: 4 nominated by the United Nations, 3 representatives of Kosovo Albanians, 1 representative of Kosovo Serbs, and 2 additional observer members. The IAC was replaced on 3 March 2002 by a cabinet formed under the Provisional Institutions of Self-Government following nationwide elections.

== Members ==
The membership of the council was as follows:

Portfolio	Minister	Took office	Left office	Party
SRSG (non-voting chairman)	Bernard Kouchner	15 December 1999	12 January 2001	United Nations
SRSG (non-voting chairman)	Hans Hækkerup	12 January 2001	31 December 2001	United Nations
Kosovo Albanians representatives	Hashim Thaçi	15 December 1999	4 March 2002	PDK
Kosovo Albanians representatives	Ibrahim Rugova	15 December 1999	4 March 2002	LDK
Kosovo Albanians representatives	Rexhep Qosja	15 December 1999	4 March 2002	LBD
Kosovo Serbs representative (participated as an observer)	Rada Trajković	15 December 1999	4 March 2002	SNV KiM
Deputies
Principal Deputy SRSG	Jock Covey	15 December 1999	4 March 2002	United Nations
Deputy SRSG for Civil Administration	Tom Koenigs	15 December 1999	4 March 2002	United Nations
Deputy SRSG for Democratization and Institution-Building	Daan Everts	15 December 1999	4 March 2002	United Nations
Deputy SRSG for Economic Reconstruction	Joly Dixon	15 December 1999	4 March 2002	United Nations
Representative of Kosovo civil society (non-voting observer)	Feride Rushiti	15 December 1999	4 March 2002	Independent
Deputy Special Representative of the Secretary-General for Humanitarian Affairs (non-voting observer)	Dennis McNamara	15 December 1999	4 March 2002	United Nations
