= Rexhep Qosja =

Albanian writer (1936–2026)

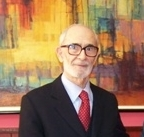
- Qosja in 2010

Representative in the Interim Administrative Council of Kosovo
- In office 15 December 1999 – 4 March 2002 Serving with Hashim Thaçi, Ibrahim Rugova and Rada Trajković
- SRSG: Bernard Kouchner; Hans Hækkerup
- Preceded by: Office established
- Succeeded by: Office abolished

Personal details
- Born: 25 June 1936 Vusanje, Kingdom of Yugoslavia (now Montenegro)
- Died: 23 April 2026 (aged 89) Pristina, Kosovo
- Party: United Democratic Movement
- Education: University of Belgrade
- Occupation: Novelist, poet, social critic, literary critic, politician
- Writing career
- Period: 1967–2026
- Notable work: Death Comes to Me from Such Eyes (1974)
- Movement: Postmodern literature

Rexhep Qosja (25 June 1936 – 23 April 2026) was a Kosovo Albanian writer, literary critic and academic who was a professor at University of Pristina. He was a prolific literary critic and literary historian of Albanian literature. As a writer he is mostly known for his 1974 novel Death Comes to Me from Such Eyes, translated into multiple languages.

== Life and career ==
Qosja was the first Doctor of Philological Sciences in Kosovo.

He was the author of various anthologies and scholarly monographs, including a three-volume history of Albanian literature in the Romantic period. He was also the author of the novel Vdekja më vjen prej syve të tillë (Death Comes to Me from Such Eyes, Pristina, 1974), translated into French, Italian, Greek, German, Dutch, Slovenian, Bulgarian and Serbian. Qosja wrote books outlining the history of the Albanian people in the Balkans. Qosja was a figure in peace talks to end the Kosovo War of 1999.

Qosja died on 23 April 2026, at the age of 89.

== Novels ==
- Death Comes to Me from Such Eyes (1974)
- One Love and Seven Sins (2003)
- The Night Is Our Day (2007)
- No One's Sons (2010)
- The Secrets Revealed (2020)

== Sources ==
- Ag Apolloni, Parabola postmoderne, 2010
- Robert Elsie, Historia e letërsisë shqiptare, 2001.
