= Istog =

Istog: Istog or Istogu (Albanian) Istok or Исток (Serbian)
- Town and municipality
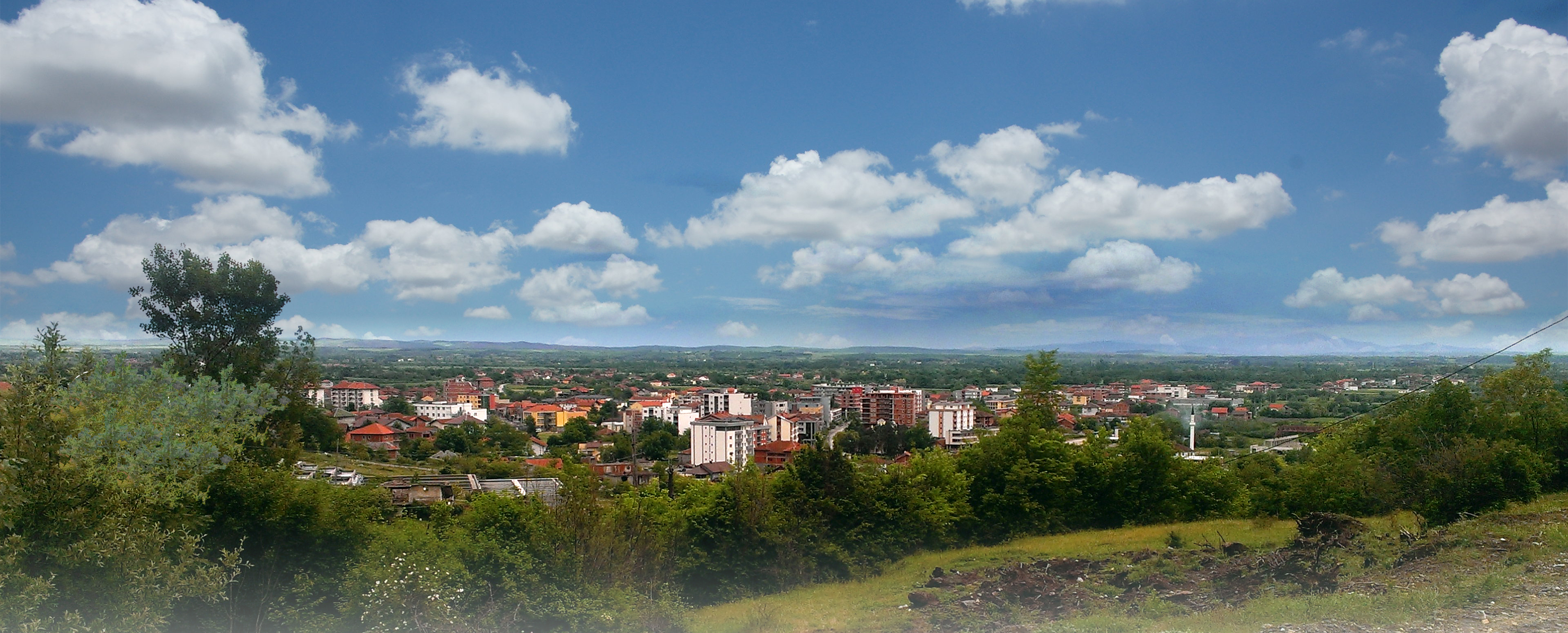
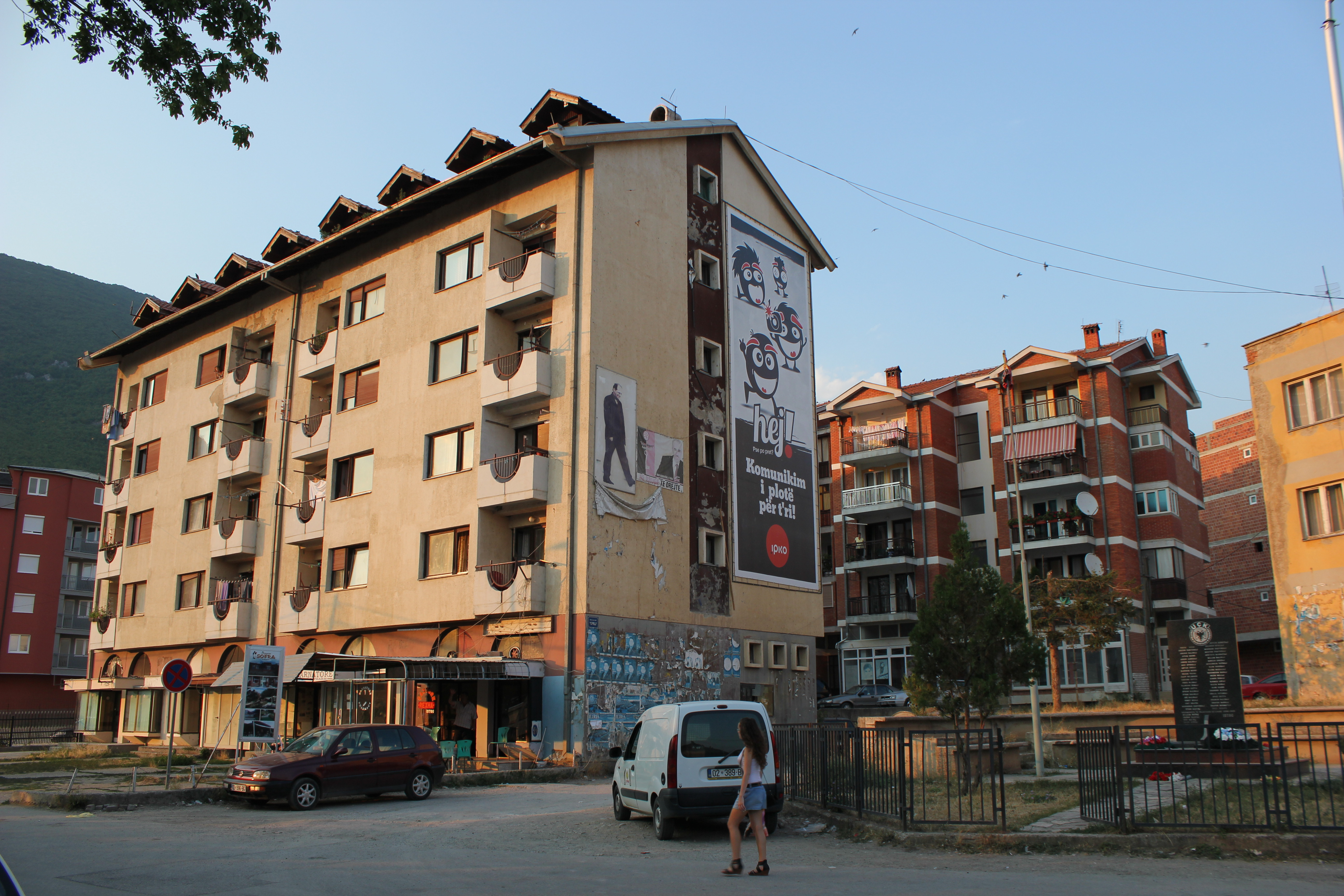
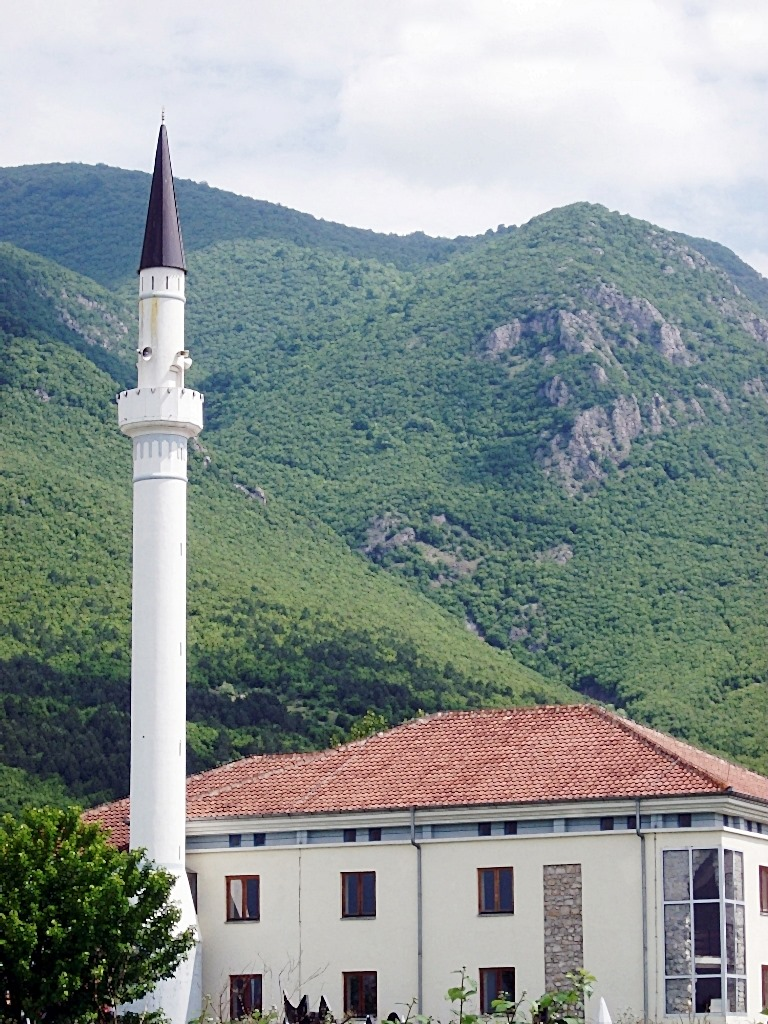
- From the top, Panorama of Istog, Street scene, Xhamia e Vjetër

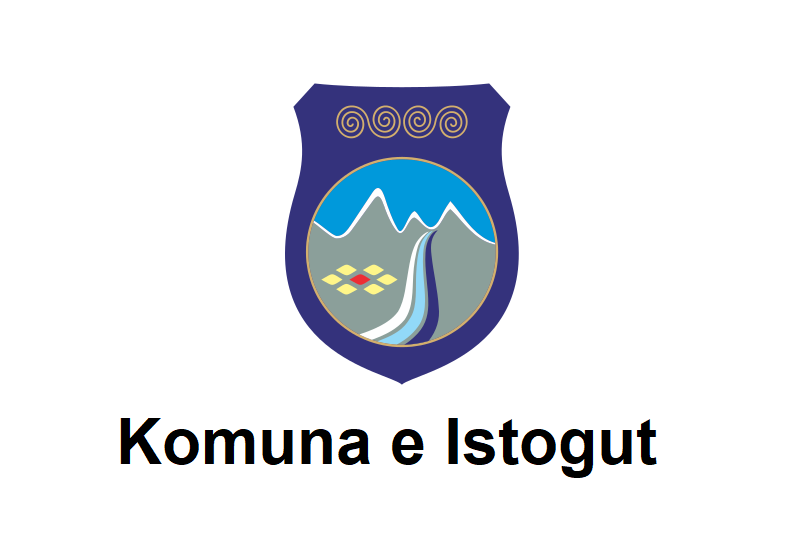
- Flag Coat of arms
- Interactive map of Istog
- Location within Kosovo
- Coordinates: 42°47′N 20°29′E
- Country: Kosovo
- District: Peja

Government
  - Mayor: Ilir Ferati (LDK)

Area
  - Municipality: 454.36 km^{2} (175.43 sq mi)
  - Rank: 7th in Kosovo
- Elevation: 480 m (1,570 ft)

Population (2024)
  - Municipality: 33,066
- Time zone: UTC+1 (CET)
  - Summer (DST): UTC+2 (CEST)
- Postal code: 31000
- Area code: +383
- Vehicle registration: 03
- Website: kk.rks-gov.net/istog

Istog or Burim (Albanian definite form: Istogu or Burimi), or Istok (Serbian Cyrillic: Исток), is a town and municipality located in the district of Peja, Kosovo. According to the 2011 census, the city of Istog has 5,115 inhabitants, while the municipality has 39,289 inhabitants. Based on the population estimates from the Kosovo Agency of Statistics in 2016, the municipality has 39,982 inhabitants.

== Name ==
The name of the town comes from the version of the Serbian word istok (variant istek), meaning "well, water source" referring to the springs of the Istočka river (Istočka reka, literally "spring river"), a tributary to the White Drin river. The name of the nearby village of Vrela, one of the largest settlements in the municipality, also means "springs".

== History ==
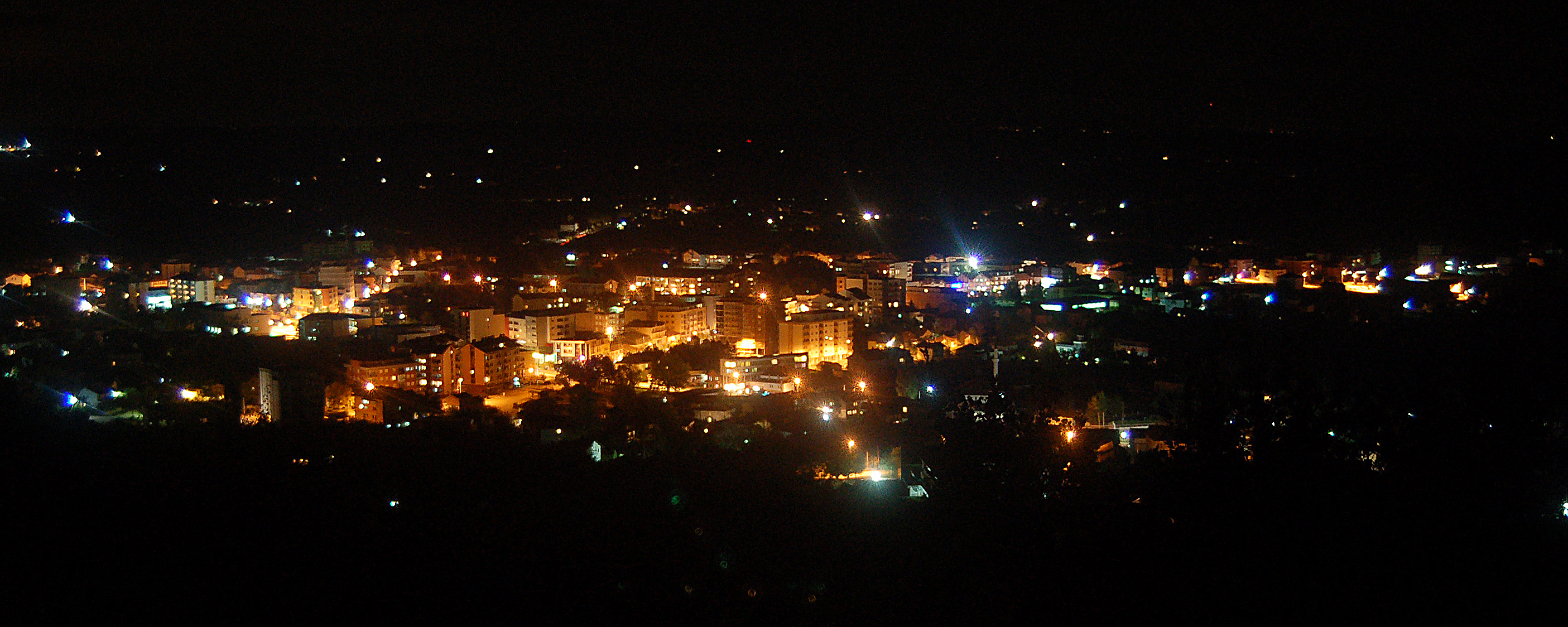
Istog at night

The Ottoman defter (tax registry; census) of 1582 registered the Ipek nahiyah as having 235 villages, of which Suho Grlo (Suvo Grlo) was located within modern Istog municipality. Suvo Grlo had three bigger mahala (neighbourhoods). One of the neighbourhoods included Muslim converts. There were several Orthodox priests in the village.

During World War II, a total of 140 Serbs were killed in 1941 and 1942 in the district of Istog and another 95 were killed in 1943 and 1944 by Albanian paramilitaries. The areas in and around Istog saw much resistance against the Yugoslav Partisans by Albanians in 1945. In Lipa, near Istog, Bajram Grobi and 9 others were surrounded by a partisan battalion - they sustained 3 losses, including Bajram himself. In August, Sali Kama and Bik Pazari resisted the partisans in Bjeshka, near Istog. In March, Berlac Rogani and 7 other men were surrounded at a mountain in Binak, near Istog, by a battalion of partisans numbering 650 Serbs and Montenegrins; after 36 hours of fighting, Rogani and his men killed 28 partisans and wounded 12 others. Rogani and his men managed to break the encirclement and all 8 fighters managed to survive despite their injuries. On the 10th of September, in Liçeva and Lesnika (also near Istog), 32 Albanians battled against 1,300 well-armed Montenegrins for 6 hours in an event known as the Battle of the 32 Heroes. Only 4 of the Albanians managed to survive despite being wounded. The commanders of the Albanian side were Shaban Sadiku, Adem Shala and Alush Smajli, with Smajli being the only one to survive with grave injuries, and the Montenegrins were from the Boka Kotorska brigade.

== Demographics ==
Municipal historical population
| Year | Pop. | ±% p.a. |
|---|---|---|
| 1948 | 25,292 | — |
| 1953 | 28,555 | +2.46% |
| 1961 | 33,779 | +2.12% |
| 1971 | 41,009 | +1.96% |
| 1981 | 50,104 | +2.02% |
| 1991 | 57,261 | +1.34% |
| 2011 | 39,289 | −1.87% |
| 2016 est. | 39,604 | +0.16% |
Source: Division of Kosovo

Urban historical population
| Year | Pop. | ±% p.a. |
|---|---|---|
| 1948 | 2,074 | — |
| 1953 | 2,111 | +0.35% |
| 1961 | 2,657 | +2.92% |
| 1971 | 3,467 | +2.70% |
| 1981 | 4,478 | +2.59% |
| 1991 | 6,384 | +3.61% |
| 2011 | 5,115 | −1.10% |
Source: Cities of Kosovo

According to the last official census done in 2011, the municipality of Istog has 39,289 inhabitants.

=== Ethnic groups ===
The municipality of Istog has an ethnic Kosovo Albanian majority. Most of the Kosovo Serbs live in the village of Osojane. Osojane is to the east of the town of Istog; also part of the Serbs lives in northern part of the municipality.

The ethnic composition of the municipality:

Ethnic Composition, Including IDPs
| Year/Population | Albanians | % | Serbs | % | Montenegrins | % | Bosniaks | % | Roma/Ashkali | % | Total |
| 1961 | 19,067 | 56.45 | 9,097 | 26.91 | 3,804 | 11.25 | 881 | 2.6 | 16 | | 33,799 |
| 1971 | 27,371 | 66.74 | 8,944 | 21.81 | 2,420 | 5.90 | 1,876 | 4.57 | 243 | 0.59 | 41,009 |
| 1981 | 35,972 | 71.79 | 7,736 | 15.44 | 1,856 | 3.70 | 3,545 | 7.08 | 747 | 1.49 | 50,104 |
| 1991 | 43,910 | 76.68 | 5,968 | 10.42 | 1,302 | 2.27 | 4,070 | 7.11 | 1,346 | 2.35 | 57,261 |
| 1998 | 51,000 | 80.1 | 7,270 | 11.4 |
| 2006 | 41,000 | 92 | 540 | 1.2 | | | 1,330 | 2.9 | 1,740 | 3.9 | 44,610 |
| 2011 | 36,154 | 92.02 | 317 | 1.89 | | | 1,142 | 2.91 | 151 | 0.38 | 39,289 |
Ref: Yugoslav Population Censuses for data through 1991, and Organization for Security and Co-operation in Europe estimates for data in 1998 and 2006, 2011 estimate

== Economy ==
After World War II, watermills on the river of Istog were nationalized and a new fish plant was built to operate as a socially owned enterprise. The company's name under Yugoslavia was "Ribnjak", meaning "piscatory" or "fishery" in Serbian. It was later privatized as Motel "Trofta", meaning "trout" in Albanian - the type of fish it has and is still producing, selling, and distributing. The company employs around 70 people. The company acts as a hotel and restaurant, often hosting traditional weddings. In 2025, Haxhi Zeka University launched the Kosovo Tourism Barometer, a project page presenting an analytical initiative that tracks hospitality service quality (hotels and restaurants) using aggregated publicly available online reviews and comments.

== Notable people ==
- Fadil Ferati, Mayor of Istog from 1999 to 2010
- Fatmire Bajramaj, footballer
- Mergim Brahimi, footballer
- Besim Kabashi, kickboxer
- Abdul Qader Arnaout, Islamic scholar
- Azdren Llullaku, footballer
- Ibrahim Rugova, former President of Kosovo
- Adnan Januzaj, footballer
- Mërgim Mavraj, footballer
- Donis Avdiaj, footballer
- Selman Kadria, local hero known for the assassination of a Serbian military commander

== See also ==
- District of Peja
- Bosniaks in Kosovo
- KF Istogu
