= Ibrahim Rugova =

Kosovo-Albanian politician

Ati Themeltar Ibrahim Rugova
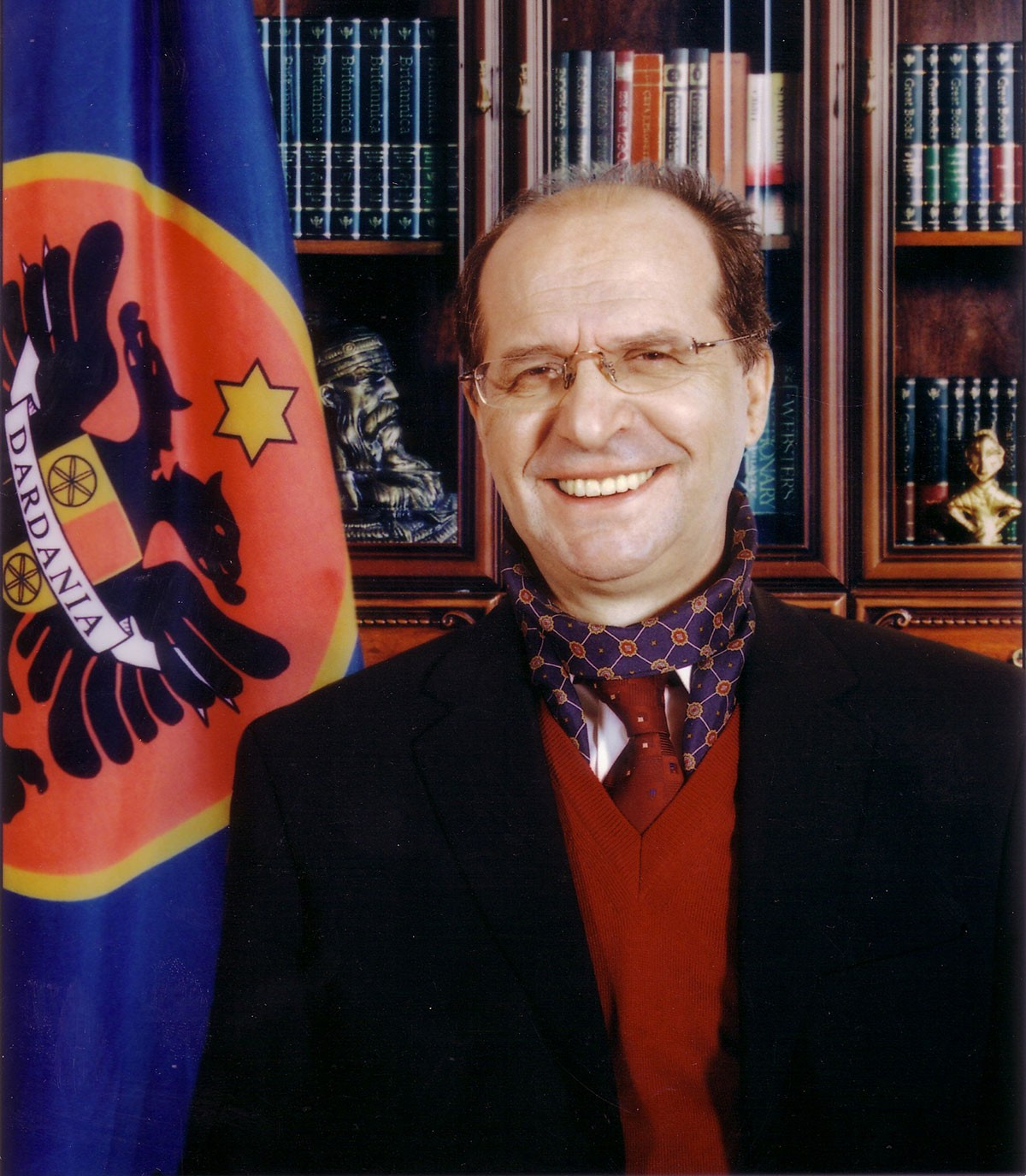
- Official portrait, 2001

President of Kosovo
- In office 4 March 2002 – 21 January 2006
- Succeeded by: Fatmir Sejdiu
- In office 25 January 1992 – 1 February 2000
- Preceded by: Office established
- Succeeded by: Himself (Note: Himself as representative in the Interim Administrative Council)

Representative in the Interim Administrative Council
- In office 15 December 1999 – 4 March 2002 Serving with Hashim Thaçi, Rexhep Qosja and Rada Trajković
- SRSG: Bernard Kouchner; Hans Hækkerup
- Preceded by: Himself (Note: Himself as President of Kosovo)
- Succeeded by: Himself

Leader of Democratic League of Kosovo
- In office 23 December 1989 – 21 January 2006
- Preceded by: Office established
- Succeeded by: Fatmir Sejdiu

Personal details
- Born: 2 December 1944 Crnce, Istok, DF Yugoslavia (now Kosovo)
- Died: 21 January 2006 (aged 61) Pristina, Kosovo under UN administration
- Cause of death: Lung cancer
- Party: Democratic League (1989–2006)
- Spouse: Fana Rugova
- Children: 3
- Awards: Hero of Kosovo

Ibrahim Rugova (Albanian: [ibɾahim ɾugova]; 2 December 1944 – 21 January 2006) was a Kosovo-Albanian politician, scholar, and writer, who served as the President of the partially recognised Republic of Kosova, serving from 1992 to 2000 and as President of Kosovo from 2002 until his death in 2006. He oversaw a popular struggle for independence, advocating a peaceful resistance to Yugoslav rule and lobbying for U.S. and European support, especially during the Kosovo War.

He founded the political party Democratic League of Kosovo (LDK) in 1989. The LDK advocated for Kosovo's independence by peaceful means. The party established a shadow government that provided basic government and social services to the Kosovo Albanian population, including education and health care, in effect creating a parallel state. In May 1992, Rugova was elected President of this parallel state. In March 2002, with a United Nations mission administering Kosovo, he was elected President of Kosovo. He held this position until his death in January 2006, and was posthumously declared a Hero of Kosovo. He is sometimes referred to as Ati themeltar ("Founding Father") or as Ati i Kombit ("Father of the Nation") in Kosovo. He is also referred to as the Gandhi of the Balkans due to his strategy of non-violent resistance.

== Family and early life ==
Ibrahim Rugova was born on 2 December 1944 in Crnce, Istok to a family that is a branch of the Kelmendi Albanian tribe. At this time, the majority of Kosovo was unified with Albania (controlled by Benito Mussolini's Italy since 1941, and later by the Germans from 1943). Yugoslav control was re-established towards the end of November 1944 when the area was liberated by the Bulgarian Army and Yugoslav partisans who defeated Albanian collaborators. His father Ukë Rugova and his paternal grandfather Rrustë Rugova were summarily executed in January 1945 by Yugoslav communists. Rugova finished primary school in Istok and high school in Peja, graduating in 1967.

He went to the newly established University of Pristina, where he was a student in the Faculty of Philosophy, Department of Albanian Studies and participated in the 1968 Kosovo Protests. He graduated in 1971 and re-enrolled as a research student concentrating on literary theory. As part of his studies, he spent two years (1976–1977) at the École Pratique des Hautes Études of the University of Paris, where he studied under Roland Barthes. He received his doctorate in 1984. As a student, he participated in a civil rights movement for the Albanians and formally joined the Communist League of Yugoslavia. He was active as a journalist throughout the 1970s, editing the student newspaper Bota e Re ("New World") and the magazine Dituria ("Knowledge"). He also worked in the Institute for Albanian Studies in Pristina as a research fellow. He published a number of works on literary theory, criticism and history as well as his own poetry. In 1988, he was elected president of the Kosovo Writers Union.

He strongly emphasized the heritage of ancient Dardania, an independent kingdom and later-turned Roman province that included modern-day Kosovo, to strengthen the country's identity and to promote his policy of closer relations with the West.

=== Personal life ===
Rugova was married to Fana Rugova with whom he had three children.

== Political career ==
The 1980s saw escalating tension within Kosovo with dissatisfaction by Serbs regarding their treatment at the hands of the Kosovan authorities, and resentment from those same authorities towards the lack of powers devolved to them from Belgrade, Yugoslavia's capital. Since 1974, the Socialist Republic of Serbia's local authority had no constitutional rule over Kosovo. In 1989, unilateral measures taken by Serbian President Milošević shattered Kosovo's autonomy by reverting it to its pre-1974 status.

A harsh system was imposed, leading to widespread violations of human rights and the repression of dissenters. An estimated 130,000 Kosovo Albanians were sacked from their jobs and the police in particular were almost completely purged of Albanians. There were numerous reports of extrajudicial beatings, torture and killings, attracting strong criticism from human rights groups and other countries. Kosovo's intellectuals also opposed the changes; Rugova was one of signatories of the "Appeal of 215 Kosovo Intellectuals" against Milošević's decision to change Kosovo's status. After demanding changes to the constitution, he was expelled from the Communist Party.

Rugova entered politics in 1989, when he assumed the leadership of the Democratic League of Kosovo (LDK), a newly formed political party that opposed the nullification of Kosovo's autonomy in the former Yugoslavia. The new party was an overwhelming success and within months, 700,000 people – virtually the entire adult population of Kosovo Albanians – had joined.

Kosovo Albanians boycotted Yugoslav and Serbian elections on the grounds that they would legitimise the Milošević government, and they also questioned its veracity. In May 1992, separate elections were held in Kosovo. Rugova won the first presidential election in the Republic of Kosova, an unrecognised state declared in secret by members of Kosovo's former assembly within Yugoslavia. An underground Kosovo Assembly was founded with Bujar Bukoshi acting as Prime Minister from the safe distance of Germany. The local Serbian government responded by arresting 112 of the 120 members of the assembly and six members of the Kosovo government and charging them with "counter-revolutionary activity."

The LDK established a shadow government and a parallel social system to the Serbian one to provide their own education and health services to the ethnic Albanian population. The shadow government's activities were mostly funded by the overseas Kosovo Albanian diaspora, based primarily in Germany and the United States. However, Rugova's government was recognised officially only by the government of Albania.

In 1991 the Yugoslav wars began following Slovenia and Croatia declaring themselves independent from the Socialist Federal Republic of Yugoslavia. By the summer of 1992, Yugoslavia was fully absorbed with the wars in Croatia and Bosnia, and had no spare military capacity to deal with conflicts elsewhere. Rugova supported Kosovo's independence but strongly opposed the use of force as a means of achieving it, fearing a Bosnia-style bloodbath. He instead advocated a policy of Gandhi-like passive resistance, stating on a visit to London that

The slaughterhouse is not the only form of struggle. There is no mass humiliation in Kosovo. We are organised and are operating as a state. It is easy to take to the streets and to head towards suicide, but wisdom lies in eluding a catastrophe.

The Serbian and Yugoslav governments subjected LDK activists and members to considerable harassment and intimidation, and argued that the shadow government was an illegal organisation. However, they did not try to shut down the LDK completely and they allowed him to travel abroad. It seems likely that Milošević saw Rugova as being useful in averting an uprising in Kosovo. The Yugoslav government would have found such a situation difficult to contain at the same time as supporting simultaneous wars in Croatia and Bosnia.

For his part, Rugova stuck to a hard line throughout the 1990s, rejecting any form of negotiation with Serbia's authorities other than on achieving outright independence of Kosovo. A compromise, or a setback in the eyes of his critics, came in 1996 when he reached an agreement with Serbia over educational facilities, under which the parallel shadow education system would not be integrated with that of Serbia.

=== The slide to war ===
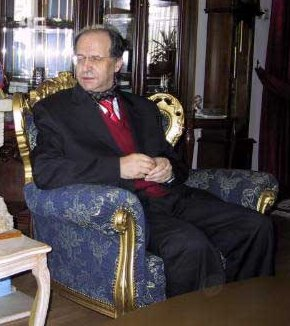
Rugova seated in 2003

Rugova's strategy of passive resistance attracted widespread support from the Kosovo Albanian population, who had seen the carnage wrought in Croatia and Bosnia and was wary of facing a similar situation. However, the Dayton Agreement of 1995, which ended the Bosnian War, seriously weakened Rugova's position. The agreement failed to make any mention of Kosovo and the international community made no serious efforts to resolve the province's ongoing problems. Radicals among the Kosovo Albanian population began to argue that the only way to break the impasse was to launch an armed uprising, in the belief that this would force the outside world to intervene. They blamed Rugova's policy of non-violence for Kosovo's failure to achieve independence. On 1 September 1996, Rugova and Slobodan Milošević signed the Milošević-Rugova education agreement in an attempt to resolve issues regarding the education of Kosovo Albanian children.

In 1997, the Kosovo Liberation Army (KLA) emerged as a fighting force and began carrying out attacks and assassinations against Serbian civilians, paramilitia and security forces as well as Albanians deemed to be "collaborators". The Serbian response was, as the KLA had predicted, forceful and often indiscriminate. By 1998, the KLA had grown into a full-scale guerrilla army, 100,000 Kosovo Albanians were refugees and the province was in a state of virtual civil war. Rugova was re-elected president in the same year and was awarded the Sakharov Prize for Freedom of Thought by the European Parliament. However, he was by now clearly being eclipsed by the KLA. This was highlighted in February 1999 when he was passed over in favour of the KLA's political chief Hashim Thaçi, who was chosen by the underground Kosovo Assembly to head the Kosovo Albanian negotiating team in the discussions on the aborted Rambouillet Agreement.

At the end of March 1999, after negotiations at Rambouillet had broken down, NATO launched Operation Allied Force to impose a resolution of the Kosovo War. Rugova spent the first few weeks of the war under virtual house arrest, along with his family, in Pristina. At the start of April 1999, Rugova was forcefully taken to Belgrade, where he was shown on Serbian state television meeting Milošević and calling for an end to the war.

Rugova was allowed to leave Kosovo for temporary exile in Italy in early May 1999, not long before the war ended. He attracted further criticism because of his slow return to Kosovo – it was not until July that he arrived back in the province. Nonetheless, he received a hero's welcome and returned to political life under the new United Nations administration in Kosovo. Rugova remained nominal president of the republic with Bujar Bukoshi as his Prime Minister; meanwhile, Hashim Thaçi, a former KLA commander, had led a provisional government since April that year. Effective power, however, was in the hands of the United Nations administration.

=== Post-war ===
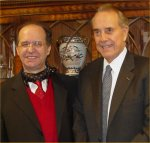
Rugova with former U.S. senator Bob Dole in 2003

Despite the political damage suffered by Rugova during the war, he soon regained public esteem and won a decisive victory against his political rivals in the KLA. The guerrillas had been welcomed as liberators by Kosovo Albanians but subsequently alienated many by the perception that they were engaging in organised crime, extortion and violence against political opponents and other ethnic groups in Kosovo. At the end of 1999, Rugova and Thaçi agreed to share provisional management duties and to work on creating provisional institutions of self-government until Kosovo's final status was decided. When elections were held in Kosovo in October 2000, the LDK won a landslide victory with 58% of the vote. Its nearest rival, Thaçi's KLA-linked Democratic Party of Kosovo, polled only 27%. On Monday, 4 March 2002, Rugova was appointed president by the Kosovo Assembly. Rugova lived to see the Constitution of Kosovo adopted by a freely elected democratic Parliament.

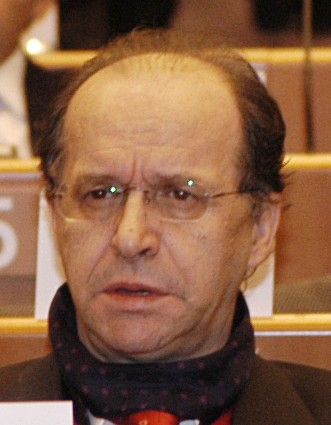
Rugova in 2004

Flag of Dardania, a flag which Ibrahim Rugova introduced during his time as President.

As the new President of Kosovo – this time formally acknowledged as such by the international community – Rugova continued to campaign for Kosovo's full independence. However, he insisted that it had to be achieved by peaceful means and with the agreement of all parties. He also pursued a policy of very close relations with the United States, as well as with the European Union. His incremental approach was criticised by radicals, but he sought to bring along the supporters of the former KLA; in November 2004, he appointed Ramush Haradinaj, the former commander of the KLA, as Prime Minister. The following month, Rugova was again elected president by the Kosovo Assembly. Nonetheless, he still encountered violent opposition. On 15 March 2005, he escaped —unhurt —an attempted assassination when a bomb exploded in a waste container as his car passed by.

Rugova demonstrated a number of unusual traits during his time as president. He was readily identifiable by the silk neckscarf that he wore and was known for his habit of giving visitors samples from his rock collection. His presents were carefully graded; the size of a crystal could reflect Rugova's feelings about the outcome of a meeting, prompting diplomats to compare notes afterwards about the size of the rocks presented to them. He was also a chain-smoker.

== Death ==
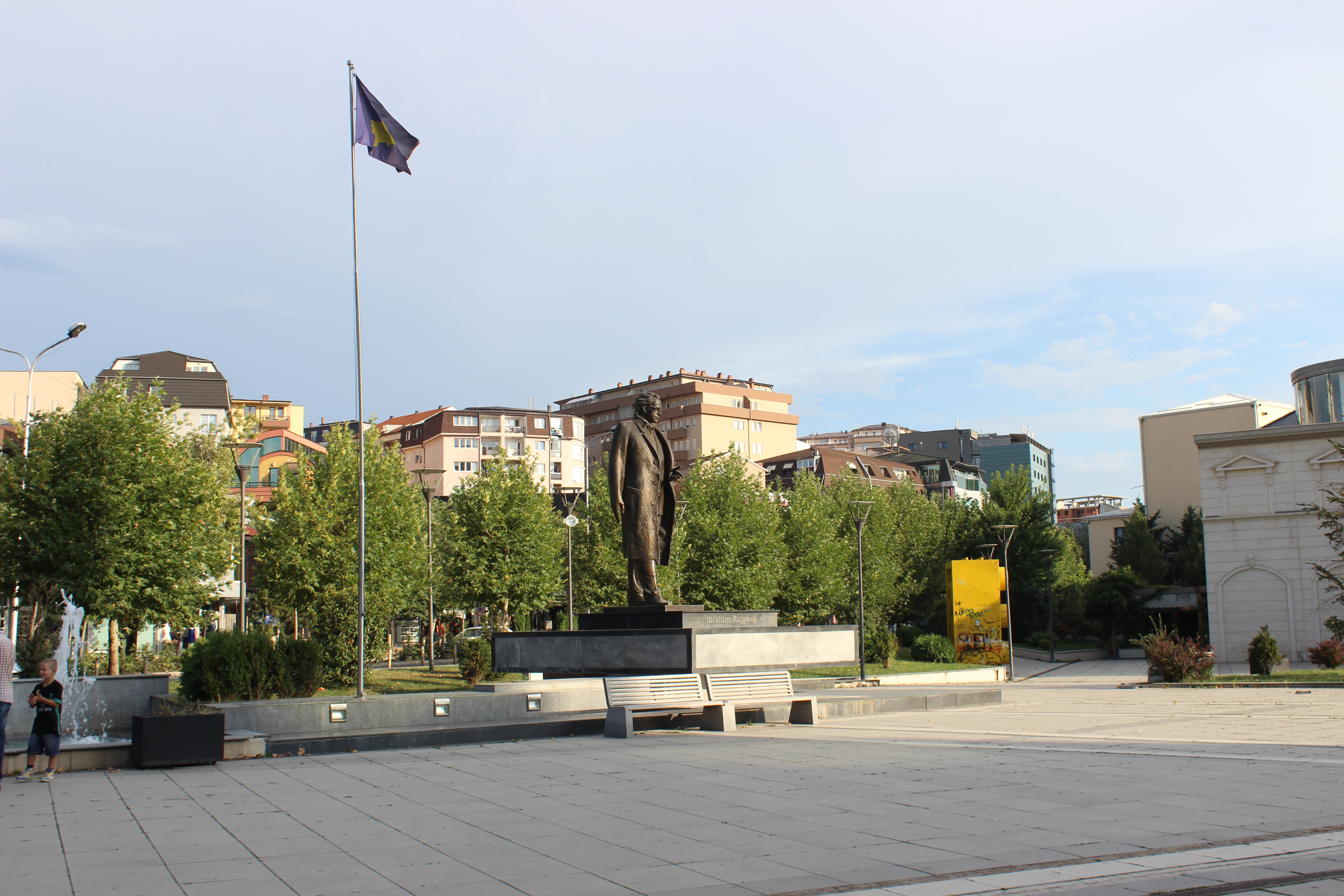
Statue of Ibrahim Rugova at Ibrahim Rugova Square in Pristina

On 30 August 2005, Rugova left Kosovo and went to the United States Air Force Landstuhl Military Hospital in Germany for medical treatment after earlier treatment in Pristina and Camp Bondsteel, the main US base in Kosovo and the second-biggest in Europe. After a week at Landstuhl he returned to Kosovo. On 5 September 2005, he announced that he was suffering from lung cancer, but said that he would not be resigning from the post of president. He underwent chemotherapy, conducted by U.S. Army doctors, at his residence in Pristina but the treatment failed to resolve the cancer. He died four months later, on 21 January 2006. He was buried without religious rites on 26 January at a funeral attended by regional leaders and a crowd estimated to be half a million people.

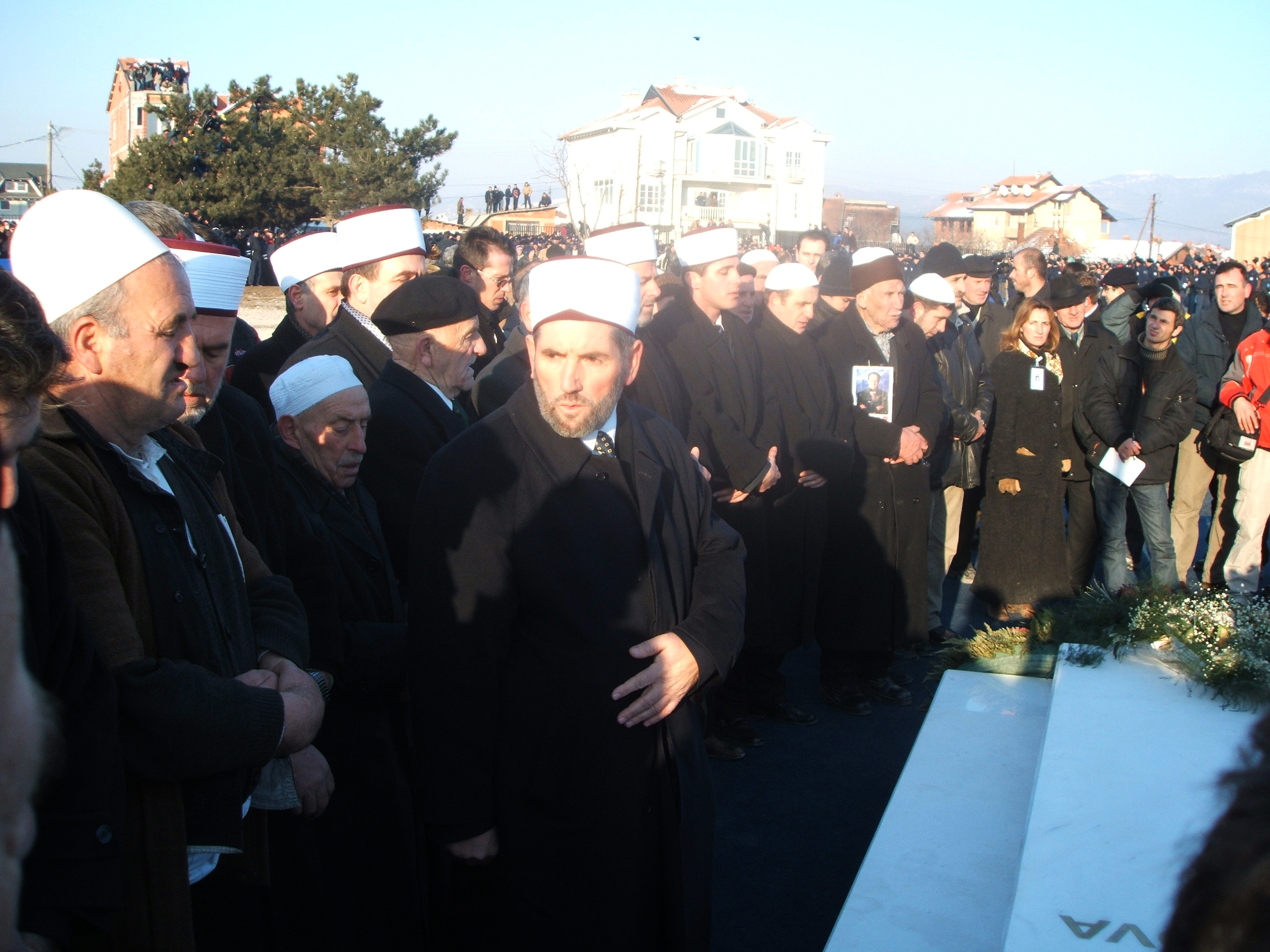
Imams conducting funeral prayer in front of Rugova's grave

There have been rumors that Rugova converted to Catholicism just before he died. These rumors have never been confirmed by his family nor other source, and one of his closest associates, Sabri Hamiti, in an essay published on the first anniversary of his death, refuted them. He said that Rugova referred to himself as a ‘symbolic Muslim’. The Chancellor of the Catholic Church of Kosovo, Don Shan Zefi, in an interview for Kosovo's national television, said that there is no evidence of Rugova's conversion to Catholicism or baptism. Zefi denied that he had baptized Rugova. Though he had a state funeral service, the head of the Islamic Community of Kosovo, together with many imams conducted Islamic funeral prayers for Rugova. His grave, located on a hilltop in Prishtina, is oriented perpendicular to Mecca, in accordance with Muslim tradition.

== Books by and about Ibrahim Rugova ==
- Prekje lirike, [Lyrical Touches], essays, Rilindja, Pristina, 1971;:
- Kah teoria, [Towards Theory], essays, Rilindja, Pristina, 1978;
- Bibliografia e kritikës letrare shqiptare 1944–1974, [Bibliography of Albanian Literary Criticism 1944–1974], Instituti Albanologjik, Pristina, 1976 (together with Isak Shema),
- Kritika letrare (nga De Rada te Migjeni), [Literary Criticism], anthology with commentary, Rilindja, Pristina, 1979 (together with Sabri Hamiti);
- Strategjia e kuptimit, [Strategy of Meaning], essays, Rilindja, Pristina, 1980;
- Vepra e Bogdanit 1675–1685, [Bogdani's Oeuvre 1675–1685], monograph study, Rilindja, Pristina, 1982;
- Kahe dhe premisa të kritikës letrare shqiptare 1504–1983, [Directions and Premises of Albanian Literary Criticism 1504–1983], monograph study, Instituti Albanologjik, Pristina, 1986;
- Refuzimi estetik', [Aesthetic Rejection], essays, Rilindja, Pristina, 1987;
- Pavarësia dhe demokracia, [Independence and Democracy], interviews and other occasional pieces, Fjala, Pristina, 1991;
- Çështja e Kosovës, [The Kosovo Issue], (together with Marie-Françoise Allain and Xavier Galmiche), Dukagjini, Peć, 1994; translation of the original La question du Kosovo – entretiens avec Marie-Francoise Allain et Xavier Galmiche, Preface de Ismail Kadare, Paris, 1994;
- Ibrahim Rugova: “La frêle colosse du Kosovo” , Desclée de Brouwer, Paris, 1999;
- Kompleti i veprave të Ibrahim Rugovës në tetë vëllime [Ibrahim Rugova's Oeuvre in eight volumes], Faik Konica, Pristina, 2005.
- On the first anniversary of Rugova's death, the Kosovo Presidency published a book entitled President Rugova, with a Preface by President Fatmir Sejdiu (‘The First Statesman of Kosovo’) and a long introduction by Sabri Hamiti (‘Memento for Rugova’). The book collects some of the President's major speeches/addresses as a leader and statesman.
- Rugova: Vizioni nacional", a publicistic book by Vehbi Miftari, „AIKD”, 2007
- "Rugova: The symbol of independence", a publicistic book by Vehbi Miftari „AIKD”, 2008
- "Rugova – mendimi, kultura, politika", a book by Vehbi Miftari, 2010
- The Winter Of Great Despair by Jeton Kelmendi

== Honours ==
- 1995 Peace Prize of Paul Litzer Foundation, Denmark.
- 1996 Honorary Doctorate of University of Paris VIII: Vincennes—Saint-Denis, France
- 1998 Sakharov Prize of the European Parliament.
- 1998 Homo Homini Award for human rights activism, People in Need
- 1999 Peace Prize, City of Münster
- 1999 Honorary Citizen of the Cities of Venice, Milan and Brescia (Italy).
- 2000 Peace Prize of the Democratic Union of Catalonia, Barcelona, Spain.
- 2003 Prize European Senator of Honour.
- 2004 Honorary Doctorate of Tirana University.
- 2006 National Flag Order (posthumously), by President of Albania Alfred Moisiu
- 2007 Order "Hero of Kosovo" (posthumously), by President of Kosovo Fatmir Sejdiu
- 2013 R7 Motorway in Kosovo linking with Albania was named after him

== See also ==
- Democratic League of Kosovo
- History of Kosovo
- Kosovo Liberation Army
- Operation Allied Force

== Sources ==
Obituaries:

- The Economist on Ibrahim Rugova, 26 January 2006
- Ibrahim Rugova, The Guardian obituary
- Independence leader Rugova given hero's funeral, The Guardian
- Kosovo Albanians Mourn Pro-Independence Leader, The New York Times
- Ibrahim Rugova, Kosovo Albanian Leader, Is Dead, The New York Times
- (in English) "Ibrahim Rugova – Profile", Vreme News Digest Agency No 257, 7 September 1996
  - San Francisco Chronicle, 22 January 2006
  - The Times, The Guardian, The Independent, Financial Times – 23 January 2006
- Kola, Paulin (2003). The Search for Greater Albania. C. Hurst & Co. Publishers. ISBN 978-1-85065-664-7.
- Vera Didanović (15 September 2005). "Umeren političar, ekstreman cilj". Vreme. 767.

Political offices
New title Republic declared	President of Kosovo; 1992–1999	Republic abolished Placed under UN administration
New title Recreated within UN administration	President of Kosovo; 2002–2006	Succeeded by Fatmir Sejdiu
