= Diocese of Prizren =

Term Diocese of Prizren may refer to:

- Roman Catholic Diocese of Prizren, former diocese of Catholic Church, that existed until 1969
- Roman Catholic Diocese of Skopje and Prizren, former diocese of Catholic Church, that existed from 1969 to 2000
- Apostolic Administration of Prizren, a territorial circumscription of Catholic Church, that was an apostolic administration from 2000 to 2018
- Roman Catholic Diocese of Prizren-Priština, current diocese of Catholic Church, which in 2018 reconstituted the diocese that existed historically.
- Serbian Orthodox Diocese of Prizren, former eparchy of Serbian Orthodox Church, that existed until 1818
- Serbian Orthodox Diocese of Raška and Prizren, current eparchy of Serbian Orthodox Church

== See also ==
- Prizren
- Catholic Church in Serbia
- Eastern Orthodoxy in Serbia
- Catholic Church in Kosovo
- Eastern Orthodoxy in Kosovo
- Diocese of Skopje (disambiguation)
