= Catholic Church in Kosovo =

- Kisha Katolike në Kosovë
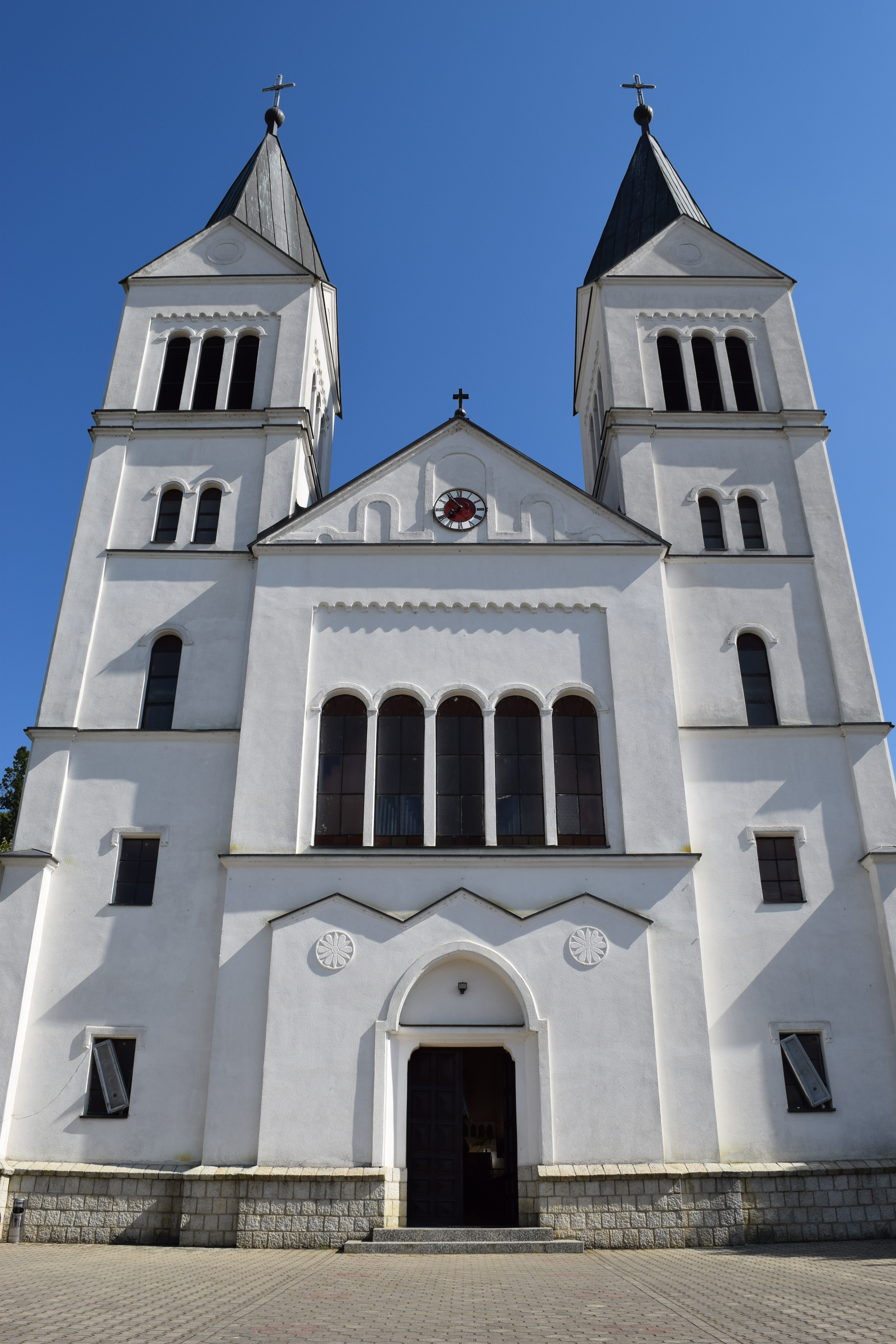
- Church of Letnica
- Type: National polity
- Classification: Catholic
- Orientation: Latin
- Scripture: Bible
- Theology: Catholic theology
- Polity: Episcopal
- Pope: Leo XIV
- Region: Kosovo
- Language: Albanian, Latin
- Headquarters: Prizren
- Number of followers: 246,000

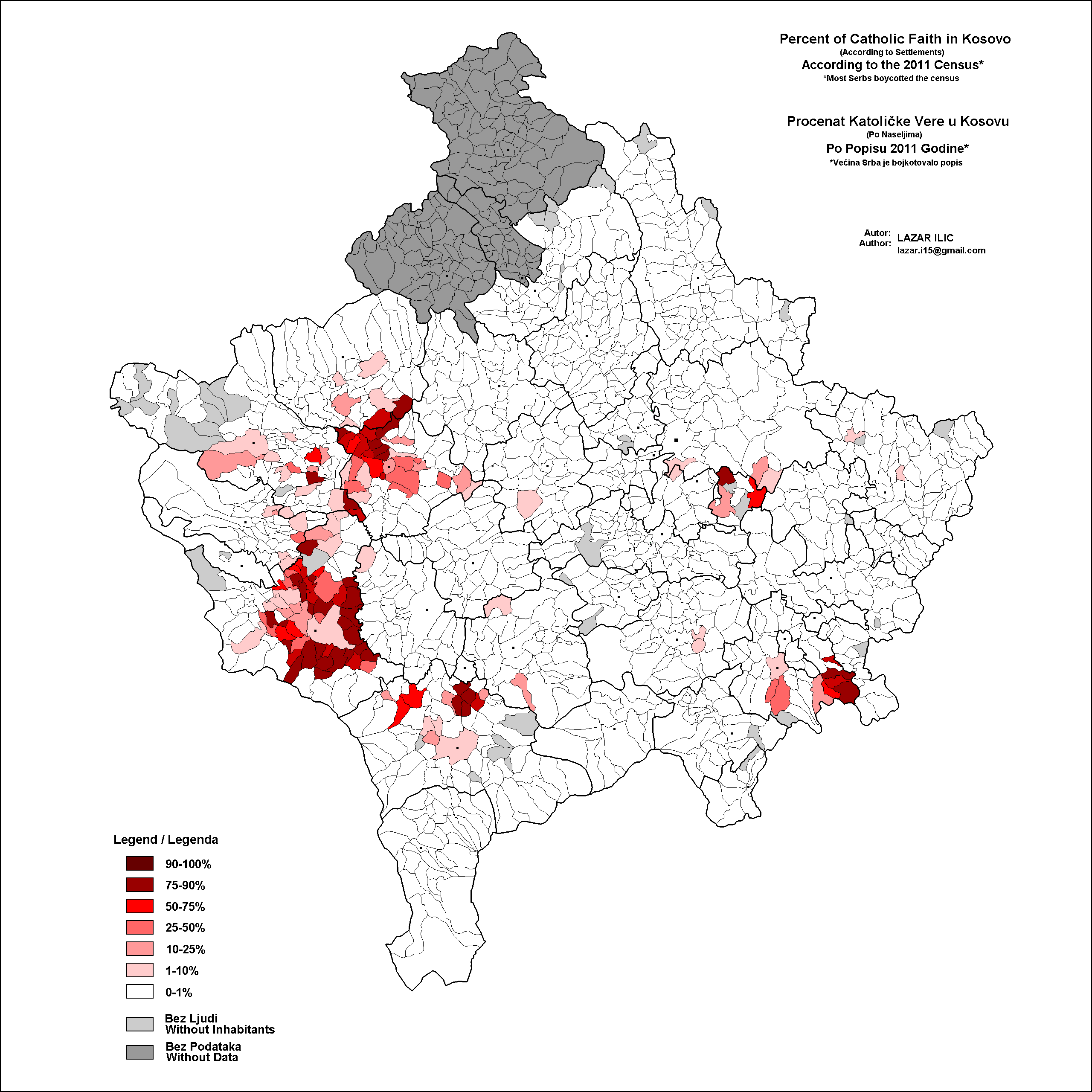
Catholicism in Kosovo, 2011 census.

The Catholic Church in Kosovo (Albanian: Kisha Katolike në Kosovë) has a number of approximately 246,000 members in a region of roughly 1.5 million people.

Another 60,000 (according to the 2011 census) Kosovan Catholics are outside the region, mainly for work. They are mainly ethnic Albanians, with a few Croats.

The Diocese of Prizren and Pristina (until 5 September 2018, an Apostolic Administration of Prizren) is the ecclesiastical district of the Catholic Church in Kosovo. It is centered in the city of Prizren. Bishop Dodë Gjergji serves as diocesan bishop as of 2019.

The Holy See does not recognise Kosovo as a sovereign state (see also Holy See's reaction to the 2008 Kosovo declaration of independence). Bishop Dodë Gjergji, the Kosovan prelate of the Diocese of Prizren-Pristina, stated "The Vatican has two segments: the Vatican as the seat of the Catholic Church and as a state. Pope Francis has raised our church from the Church of Kosovo to the Church of Prizren-Pristina, just like the bishops all over the world. Therefore, religiously we are very fine. The state aspect is a diplomatic aspect."

== Apostolic Delegate ==
Archbishop Juliusz Janusz, 66, originally a priest of the Archdiocese of Kraków, Poland, is the Apostolic Nuncio to Slovenia and the Apostolic Delegate to Kosovo; he had served previously as Apostolic Nuncio to Hungary and before that as Apostolic Nuncio to Mozambique and Rwanda. He was delegate from 10 February 2011 to 21 September 2018.

Titular archbishop of Sulci Jean-Marie Speich is Apostolic Nuncio to Slovenia and Apostolic Delegate to Kosovo from 19 March 2019.

== History ==
=== Middle Ages ===
In 535, emperor Justinian I created the Archbishopric of Justiniana Prima, centered in the emperor's birth-city of Justiniana Prima, near modern Lebane in Serbia. The archbishopric had ecclesiastical jurisdiction over all provinces of the Diocese of Dacia. By the beginning of the 7th century, Byzantine provincial and ecclesiastical order in the region was destroyed by invading Avars and Slavs. After the Great Schism between the east and the west, Albanians who had ties to the Roman church started converting to Catholicism. Northern Albanians started to convert to Catholicism en masse during the 12th and 13th centuries, including Albanians living in Kosovo. During the late 12th century Kosovo was fully conquered by Stefan Nemanja, thus introducing Serbian Orthodoxy to local Vlachs, Bulgarians and Catholic Albanians. Albanians in Kosovo are reported by Stefan Uroš I, as well as Albanian toponyms in the Drenica valley and Dukagjin plains (1246-1255) and in Rugovo (1292). Most of these Albanians were Roman Catholic.

When Stefan Dečanski founded the Visoki Dečani monastery in 1327, he referred to "villages and katuns of Vlachs and Albanians" in the area of White Drin. King Stefan Dečanski granted the Visoki Dečani monastery with pasture land along with catholic Vlach and Albanian katuns around Drin and Lim rivers of whom had to carry salt and provide serf labour for the monastery.

A chrysobull issued by Serbian Tsar Stefan Dušan to the Monastery of Saint Mihail and Gavril in Prizren, between 1348 and 1353, records the presence of Catholic Albanians in the Plains of Dukagjin, the vicinity of Prizren, and the villages of Drenica. Albanians also moved north to work in the mines of Novo Brdo, thus reinforcing the Albanian population in Kosovo, and Ragusan documents from the early 14th century report 150 Catholic Albanian household heads residing in Novo Brdo with their families, living alongside Saxon miners and Ragusan merchants. These documents also note Albanian communities in Trepça and Prizren. Ragusan documents attest to the presence of a significant number of Albanians living in Novo Brdo throughout the 14th and early 15th centuries, including members of the Catholic Albanian clergy. Many Albanian Catholic priests were registered as residing in Novo Brdo, as well as in towns like Janjevo, Trepça, Prizren and others. These Catholic Albanian priests served as the primary Catholic priests for the town of Novo Brdo. Subsequent waves of Catholic Albanians kept arriving in Novo Brdo up until the 17th century. Further Albanian expansion into Kosovo became evident in the 17th century, with waves of Catholic Albanian colonists arriving in the mining areas and settling in towns like Pristina and Gjakova. In 1638 the Roman archbishop of Antivari Gjergj Bardhi reported that the Gjakova and Prizren areas had an Albanian majority and were Albanian speaking.

Pope John XXII tried to turn Catholic Albanians against Serbian rule, but this did not succeed. In 1332, an anonymous Dominican priest called for help to liberate "catholic Latins and Albanians who detest Slavic rule" from the Kingdom of Rascia(Serbia). Under the rule Tsar Stefan Dušan, all Catholic believers were persecuted, including those Albanians of the Catholic faith. After the Battle of Kosovo in 1389 Serbian rule in Kosovo started to weaken and Ottoman Islam was first introduced in Kosovo, with the first mosques being built in Pristina, Vushtrri and Prizren. In 1455 Kosovo was fully conquered by the Ottomans, with Novo Brdo falling in 27 of June 1441, Prizren in 21 of June 1455 and Zvečan in 1455, thus ending 157 years of Serbian rule in Kosovo.

=== Kosovo war (1997-1999) ===
During the Kosovo war, vandalization of Kosovo Albanian Catholic churches occurred. The Catholic Church of St Anthony located in Gjakovë had major damage done by Yugoslav Serb soldiers. In Pristina, Yugoslav Serb officers ejected nuns and a priest from the Catholic church of St. Anthony and installed aircraft radar in the steeple.

== Modern period ==
An important Catholic charity organization is Caritas Kosovo which has a presence all over the country, including in the Serbian dominated areas.

On 26 November 2019, an earthquake struck Albania. The Catholic Church in Kosovo held mass on 1 December across the country and it collected charitable donations by parishioners for earthquake victims and their families.

One of the oldest Catholic churches in Kosovo is the Catholic church of Vinarc, in Mitrovica. It is disputed by Serbian Orthodox Church.

== Churches ==
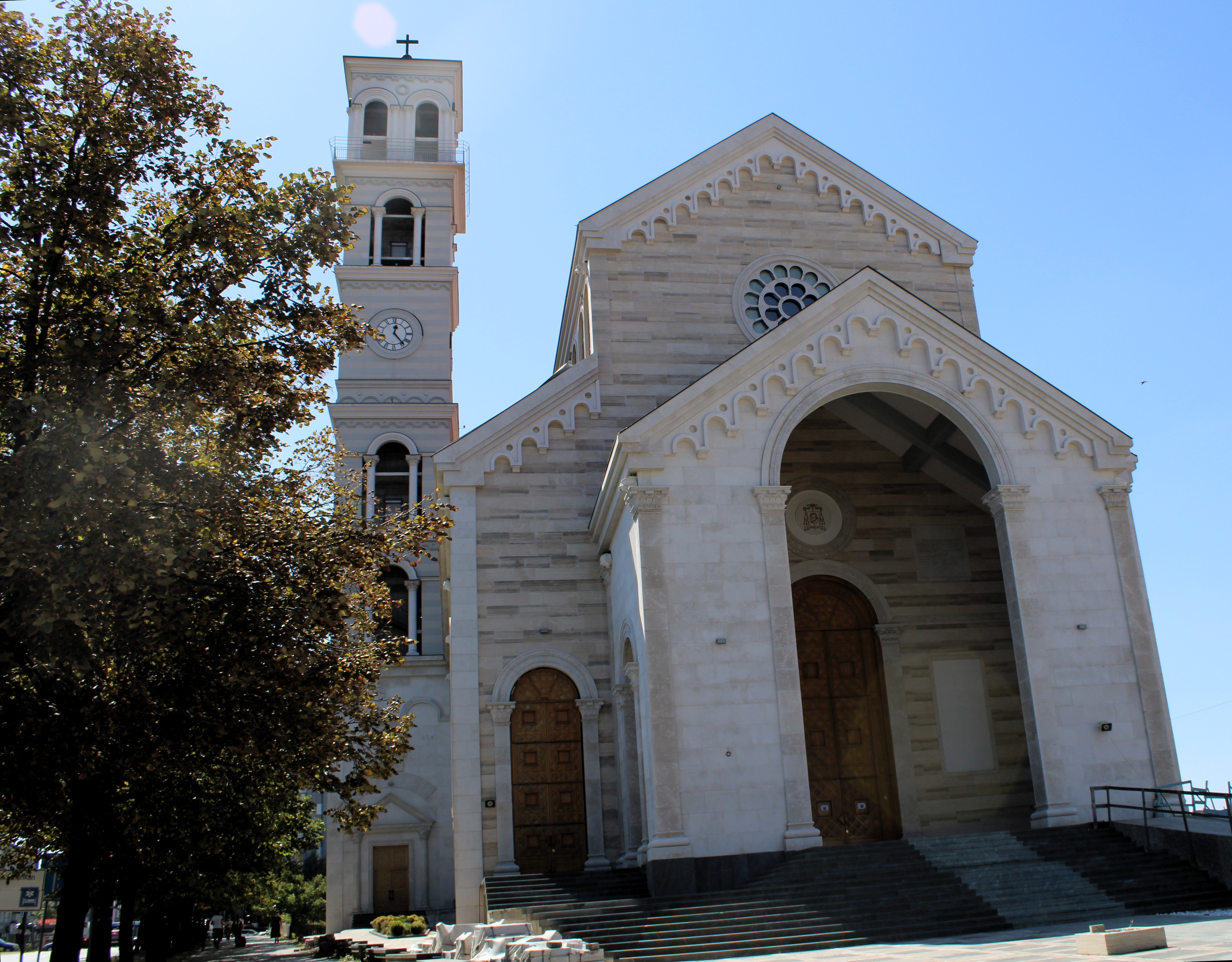
Cathedral of Saint Mother Teresa

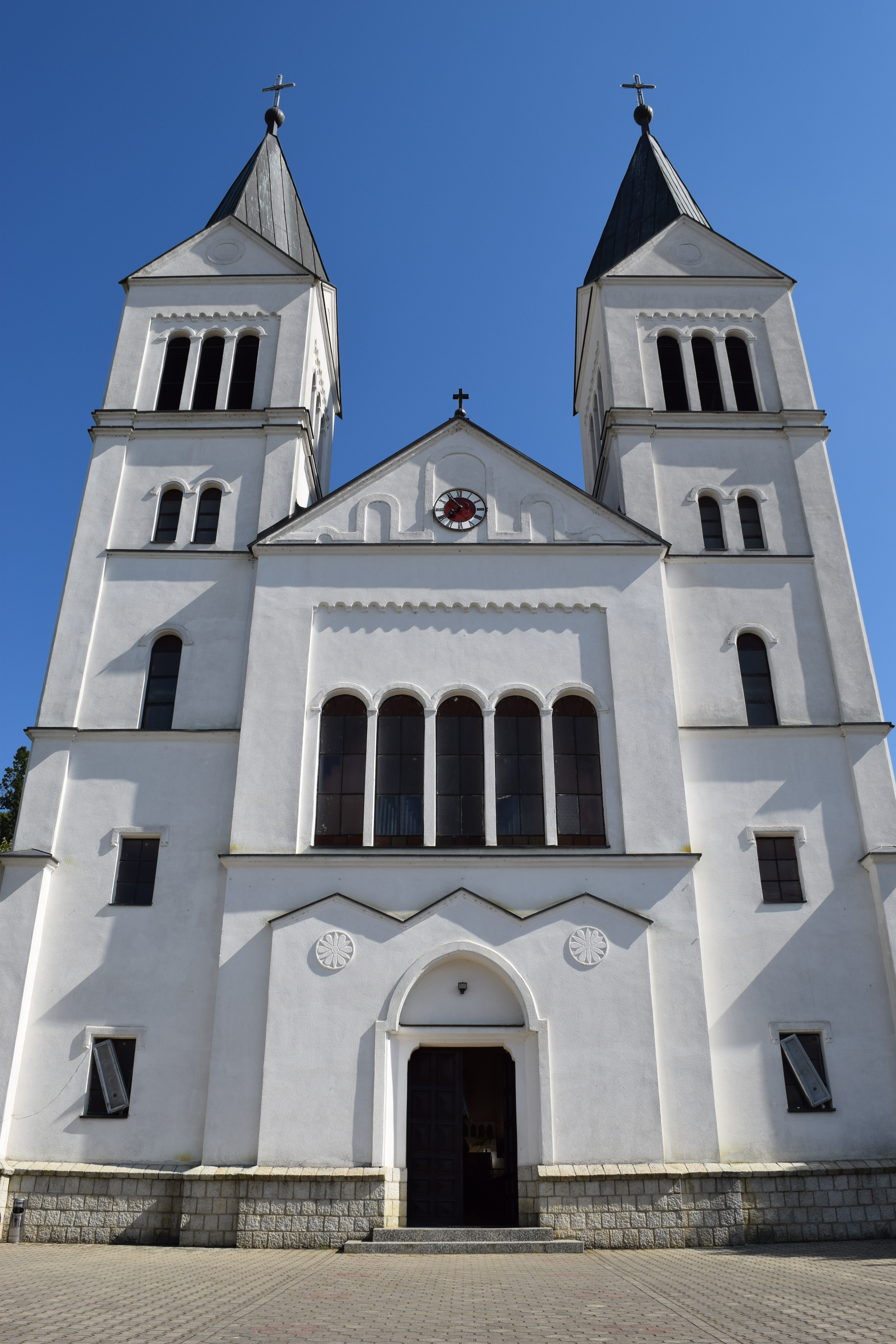
Church of Letnica

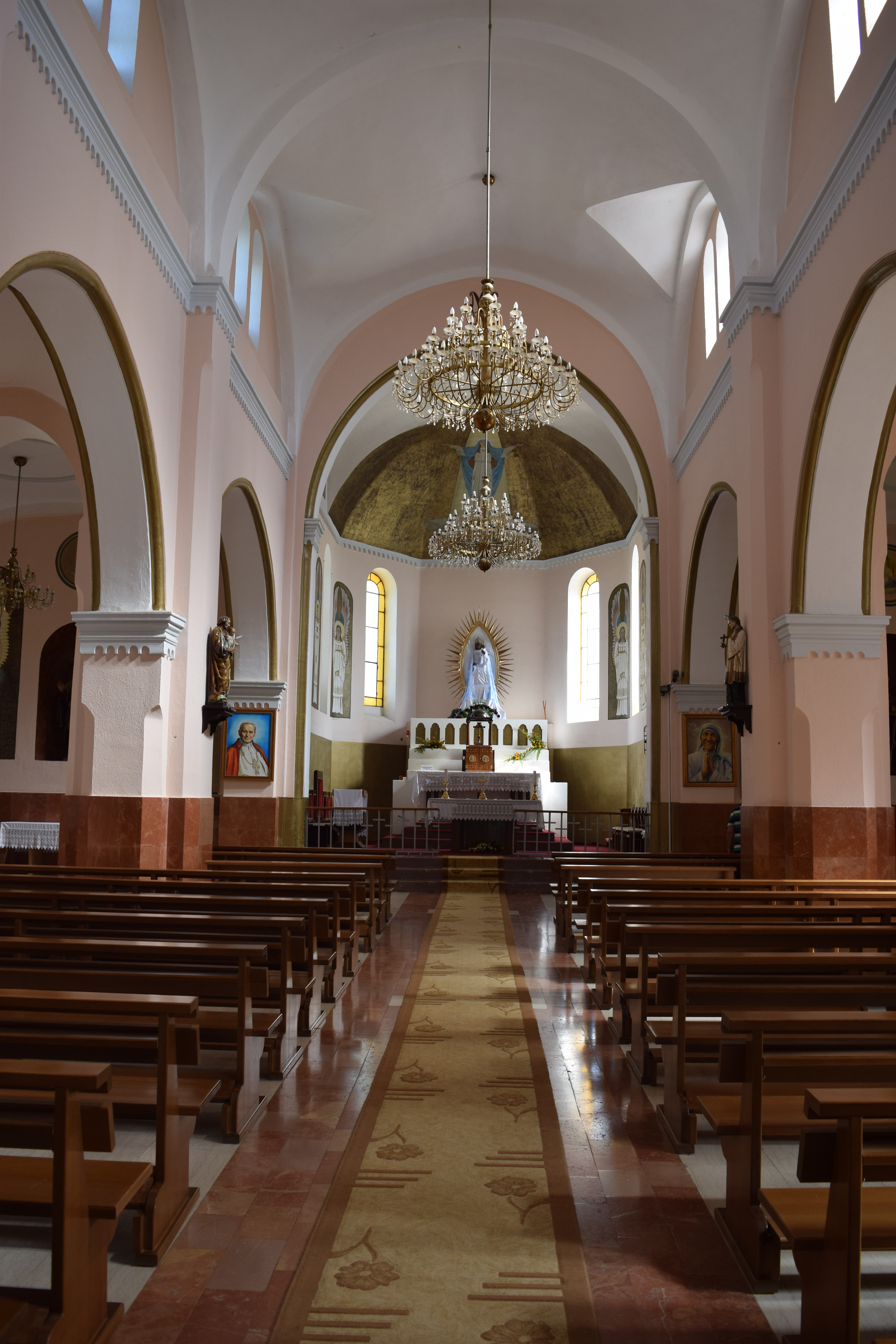
Interior

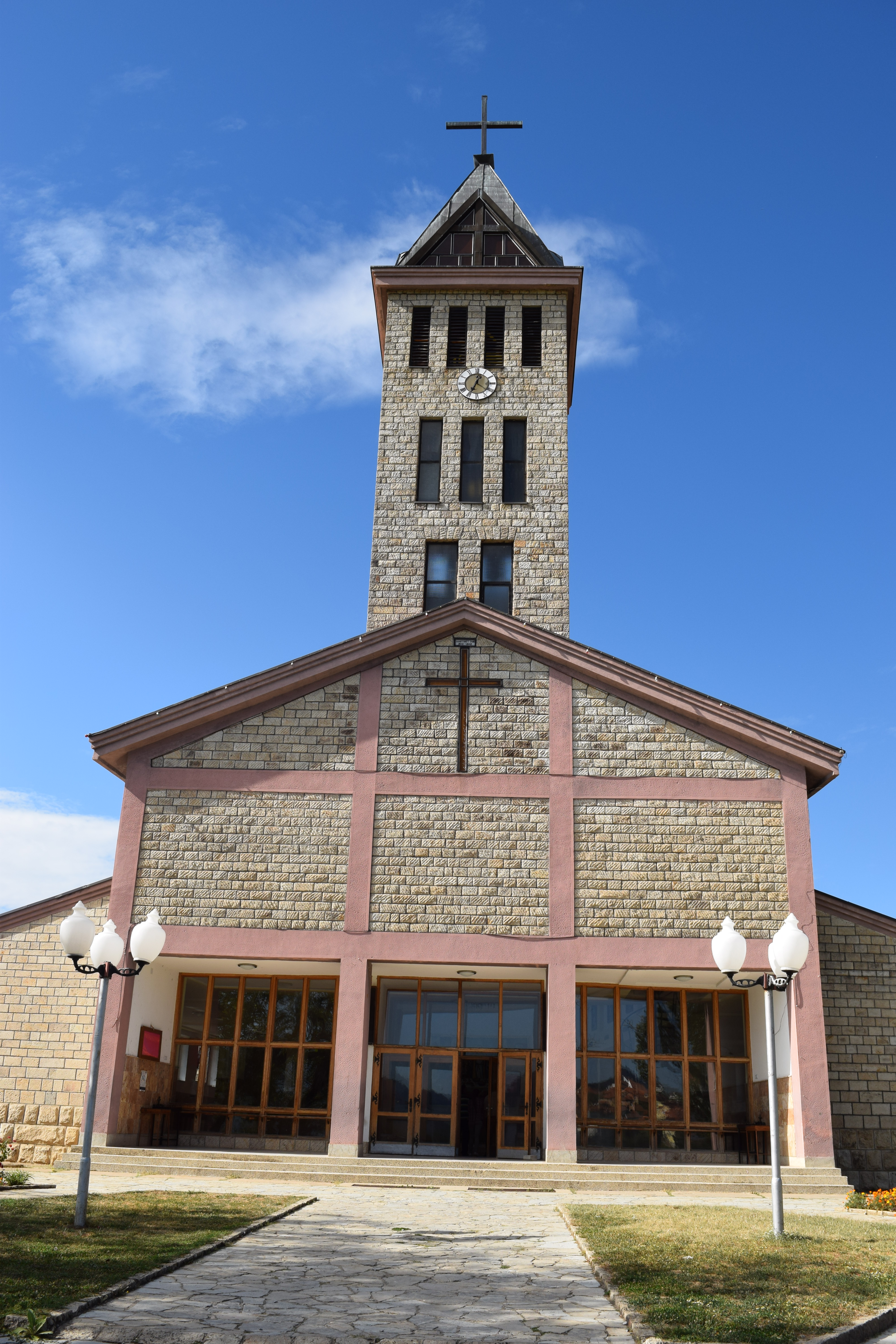
Church of Stublla

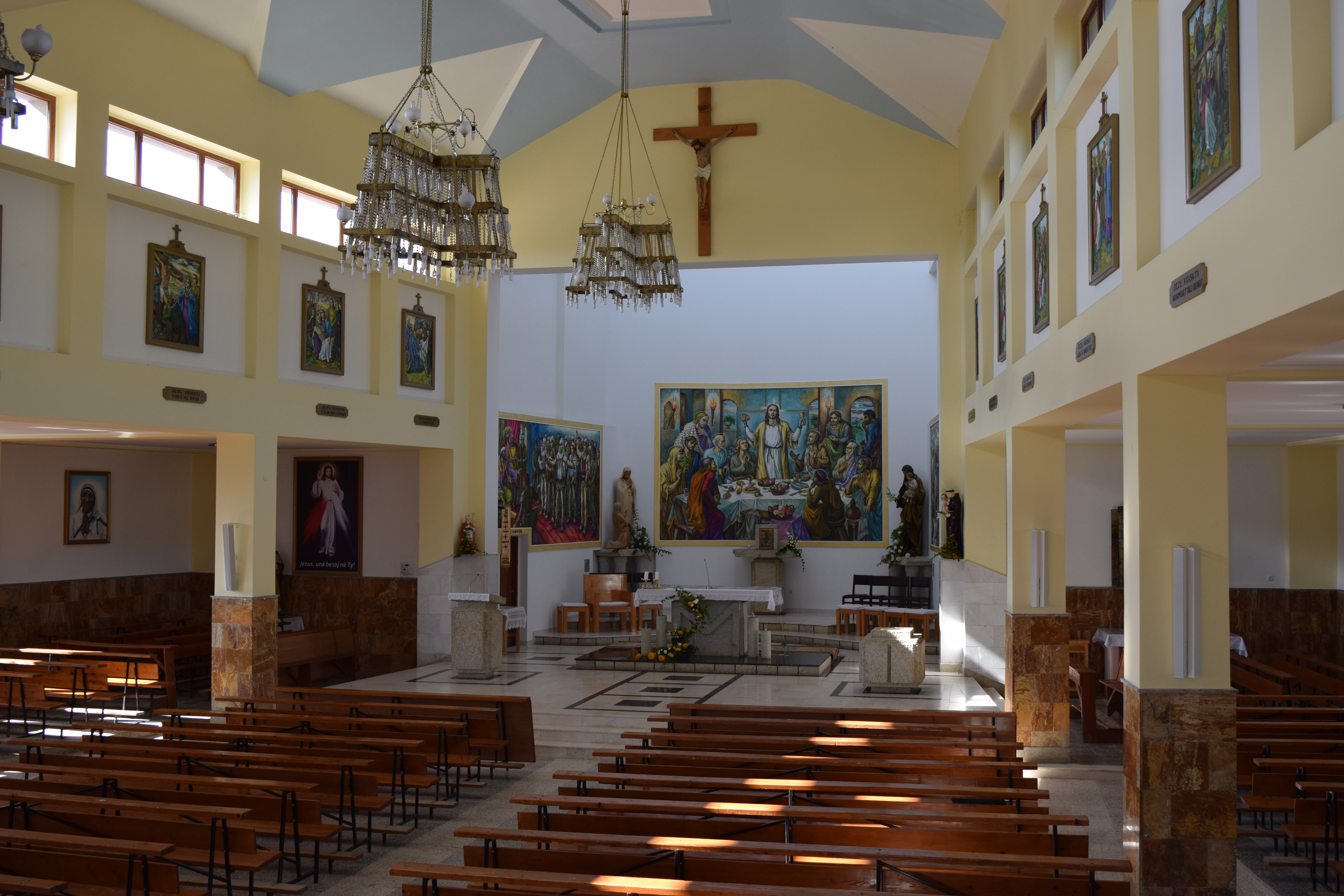
Interior

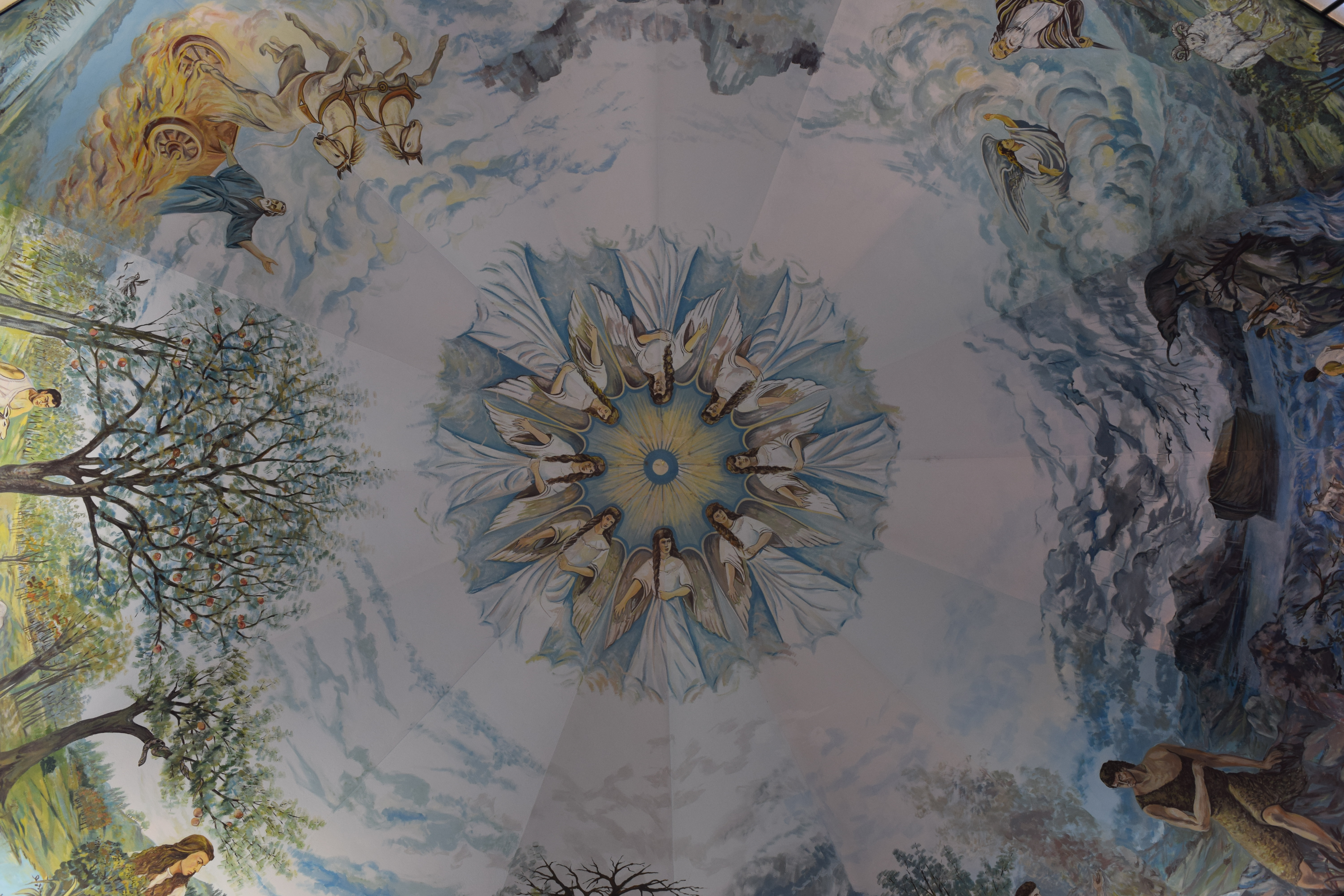
Church ceiling of Morava e Binçës.

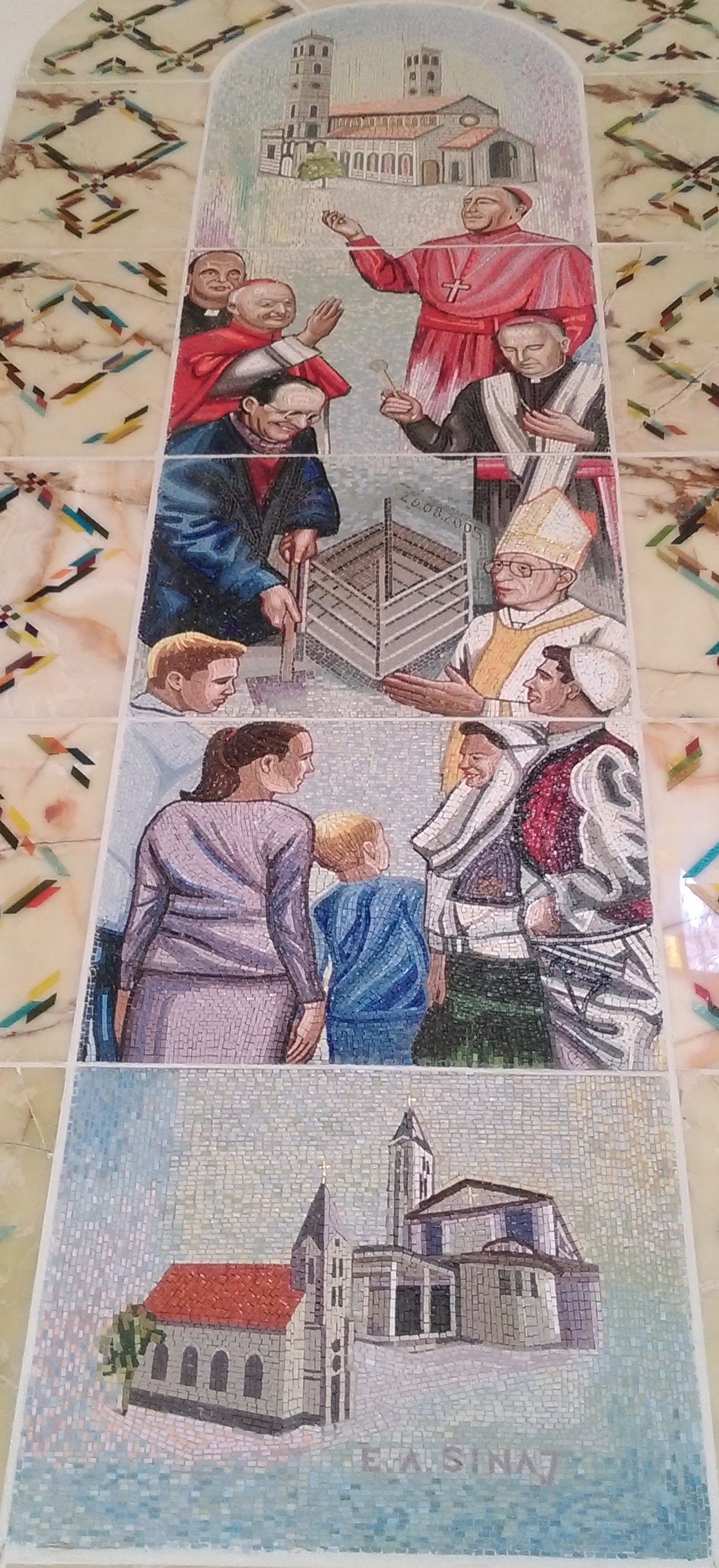
Mosaic depiction of Catholicism and Catholic life in Kosovo, Cathedral of Saint Mother Teresa in Pristina

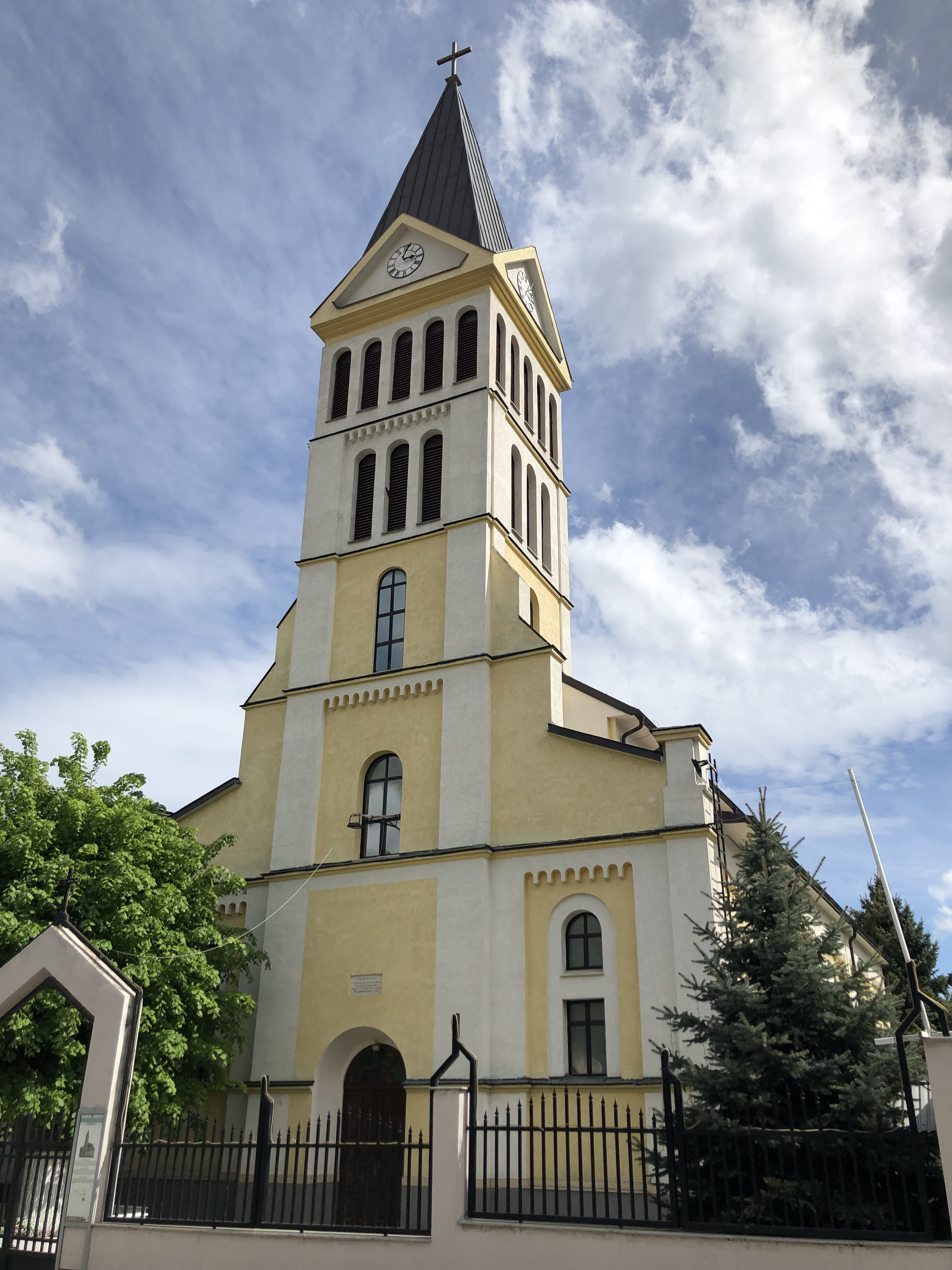
Saint Catherine Church in Peja

== See also ==
- Religion in Kosovo
- Christianity in Kosovo
  - Serbian Orthodox Church in Kosovo
  - Protestantism in Kosovo
  - Kosovo Protestant Evangelical Church (KPEC)
- Laramans, historical community of crypto-Catholics
