= Christianity in Kosovo =

Christianity in Europe by percentage of country population Christianity in Europe (2010) 95–100%: Malta; Moldova; Armenia; Romania; Vatican City; 90–95%: San Marino; Portugal; Liechtenstein; Ireland; Serbia; Croatia; Poland; Iceland; 80–90%: Finland; Austria; Hungary; Bulgaria; Italy; Denmark; Ukraine; Norway; Slovakia; Monaco; Greece; Georgia; Andorra; Lithuania; 70–80%: Luxembourg; Belarus; Switzerland; Cyprus; Russia; Montenegro; Slovenia; Spain; 60–70%: France; Belgium; United Kingdom; Sweden; Germany; 50–60%: Netherlands; Latvia; North Macedonia; 30–40%: Bosnia and Herzegovina; Estonia; 20–30%: Czech Republic; 10–20%: Albania; Kazakhstan; 5–10%: Kosovo; 2–4%: Azerbaijan; < 1%: Turkey

Christianity in Kosovo has a long-standing tradition dating to the Roman Empire. The entire Balkan region had been Christianized by the Roman, Byzantine, First Bulgarian Empire, Serbian Kingdom, Second Bulgarian Empire, and Serbian Empire till 13th century. After the Battle of Kosovo in 1389 until 1912, Kosovo was part of the Muslim Ottoman Empire, and a high level of Islamization occurred. During the time period after World War II, Kosovo was ruled by secular socialist authorities in the Socialist Federal Republic of Yugoslavia (SFRY). During that period, Kosovars became increasingly secularized. Today, 87% of Kosovo's population are from Muslim family backgrounds, most of whom are ethnic Albanians, but also including Slavic speakers (who mostly identify themselves as Gorani or Bosniaks) and Turks.

== Early Christianity ==
Christianity started to spread throughout the southeastern Europe during the 1st century. Early martyrs Florus and Laurus from the 2nd century, who were murdered along with other 300 Christians in Ulpiana, near modern Lipjan, are venerated by the locals.

Proto-Albanian speakers were Christianized under the Latin sphere of influence, specifically in the 4th century CE, as shown by the basic Christian terms in Albanian, which are of Latin origin and entered Proto-Albanian before the Gheg–Tosk dialectal diversification.

Dardania had a Diocese in the 4th century, and its seat was placed in Ulpiana, which remained the episcopal center of Dardania until the establishment of Justiniana Prima in 535 AD. In 395, the Empire was divided, and its eastern half later became known as the Byzantine Empire.

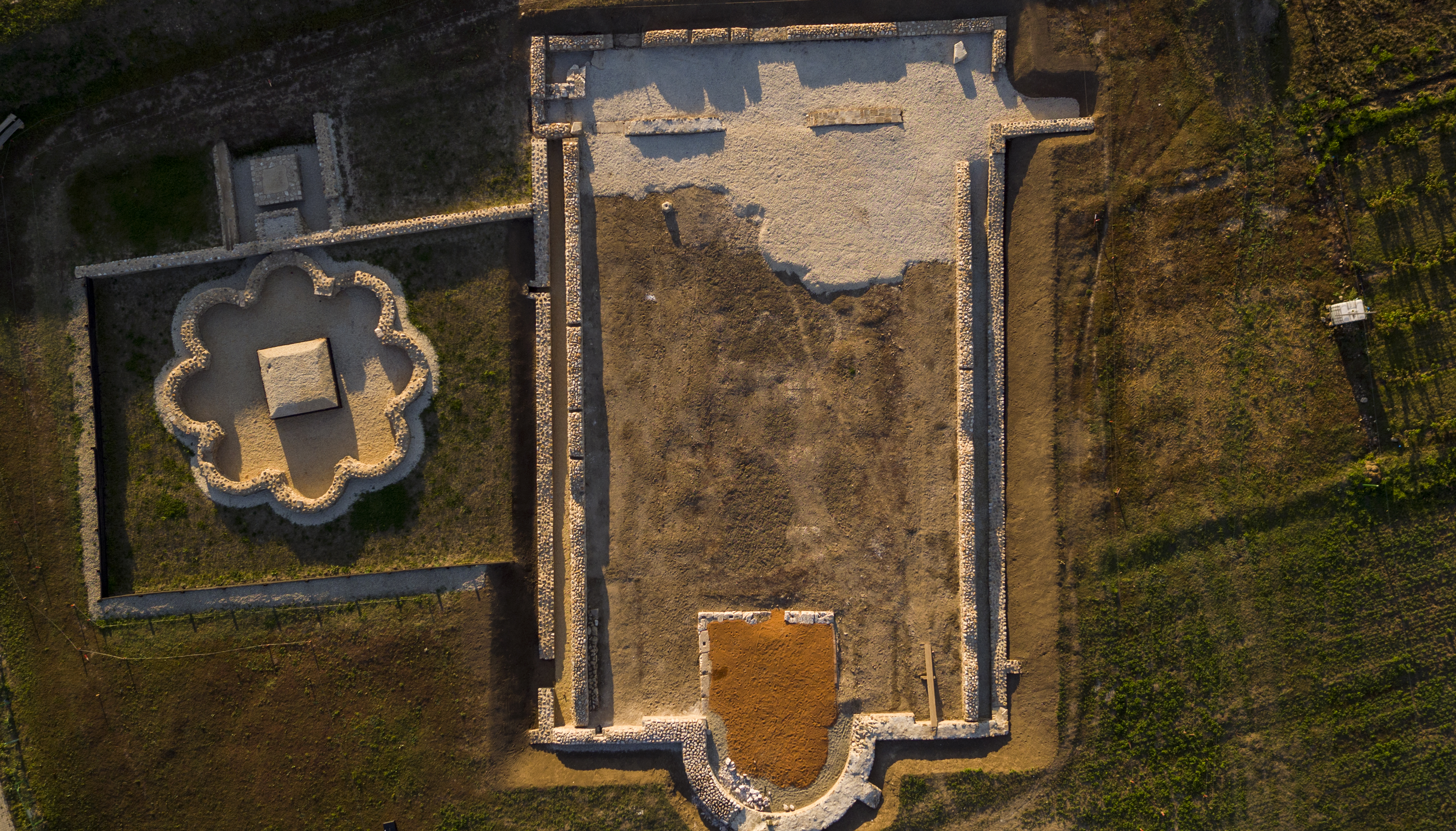
The layout of the Episcopal Basilica (right) and baptismal chapel (left) in Ulpiana, 6th Century

Emperor Justinian issued the Corpus Juris Civilis and sought to create an Illyrian Church, by the establishment of the Archbishopric of Justiniana Prima, centered in the emperor's birth-city of Justiniana Prima and exercising ecclesiastical jurisdiction over all provinces of the Diocese of Dacia, and by rebuilding Ulpiana as Justiniana Secunda, which was intended to become the centre of Byzantine administration.

The plague of Justinian had killed millions of native Balkan people and as a result many regions had become depopulated and neglected by the government, this gave the Slavs a chance into settle in the Balkans. Slavic migrations to the Balkans took place between the 6th to 7th centuries. The region had been part of the Roman and Byzantine empires until the first major Slav raids took place in the middle of Justinian's reign. In 547 and 548 the Slavs invaded the territory of modern-day Kosovo, and then got as far as modern-day Durrës on the Northern Albanian coast and reached all the way down to Greece.

At the time of the South Slavic incursion and the threat of ethnic turbulence in the Albanian-inhabited regions, the Christianization of the Albanians had already been completed and it had apparently developed for Albanians as a further identity-forming feature alongside the ethnic-linguistic unity. Church administration, which was controlled by a thick network of Roman bishoprics, collapsed with the arrival of the Slavs. Between the early 7th century and the late 9th century the interior areas of the Balkans were deprived of church administration, and Christianity might have survived only as a popular tradition on a reduced degree. The reorganization of the Church as a cult institution in the region took a considerable amount of time, as the Balkans were brought back into the Christian orbit only after the recovery of the Byzantine Empire and through the activity of Byzantine missionaries.

In 726 Byzantine Emperor Leo III the Isaurian established de jure the jurisdiction of the Ecumenical Patriarchate of Constantinople over the Balkans, as the Church and the State established an institution. The Eastern Church expanded its influence in the area along with the social and political developments. Between the 7th and 12th centuries a powerful network of cult institutions were revived completely covering the ecclesiastical administration of the entire present-day Albanian-speaking compact area. In particular an important role was played by the Theme of Dyrrhachium and the Archdiocese of Ohrid. The lack of Old Church Slavonic terms in Albanian Christian terminology shows that the missionary activities during the Christianization of the Slavs did not involve Albanian-speakers, indeed, the Christian belief among Albanians had survived through the centuries and already become an important cultural element in their ethnic identity.

== Eastern Orthodoxy ==
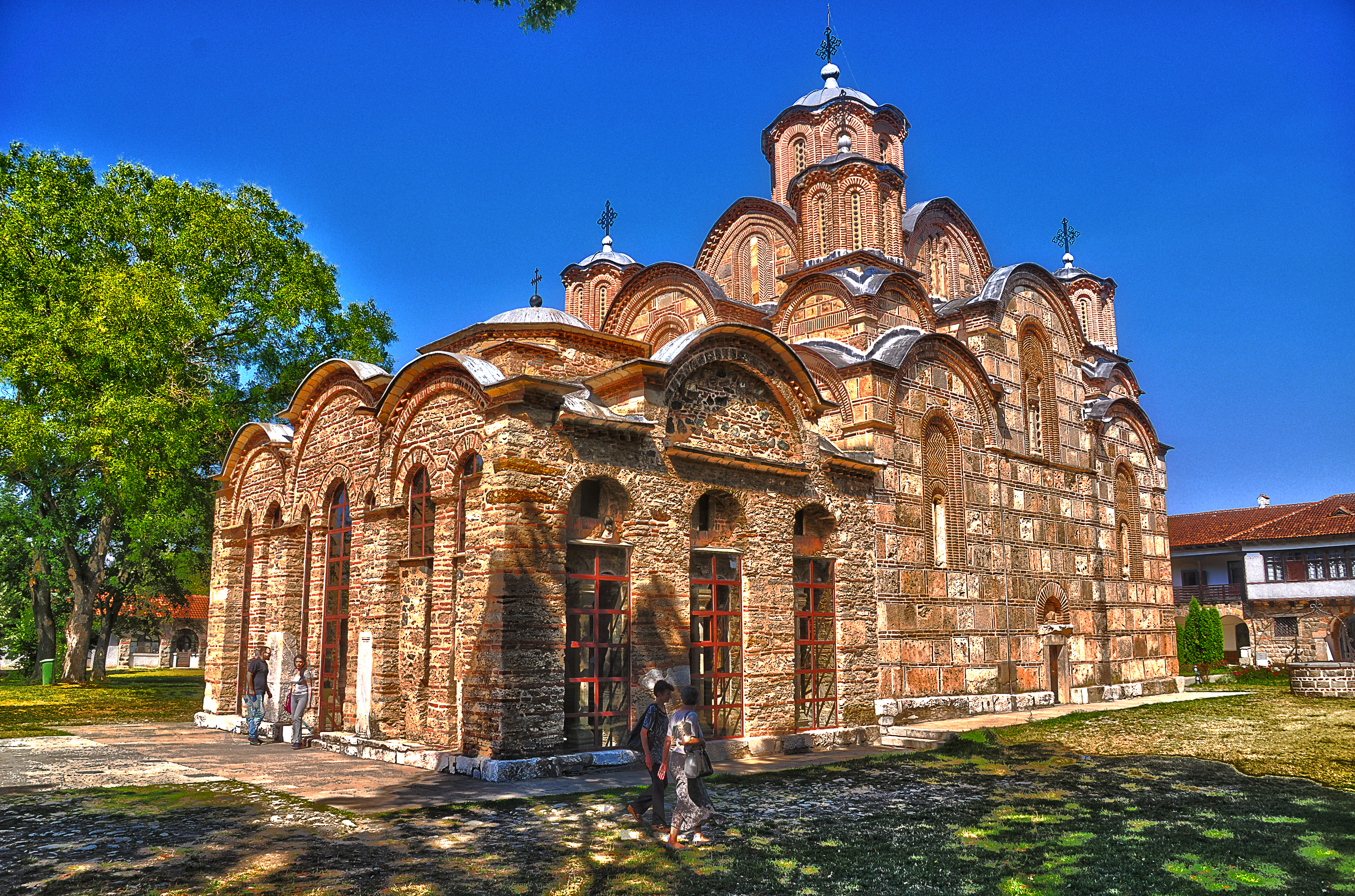
Serbian Orthodox Gračanica Monastery, 14th century

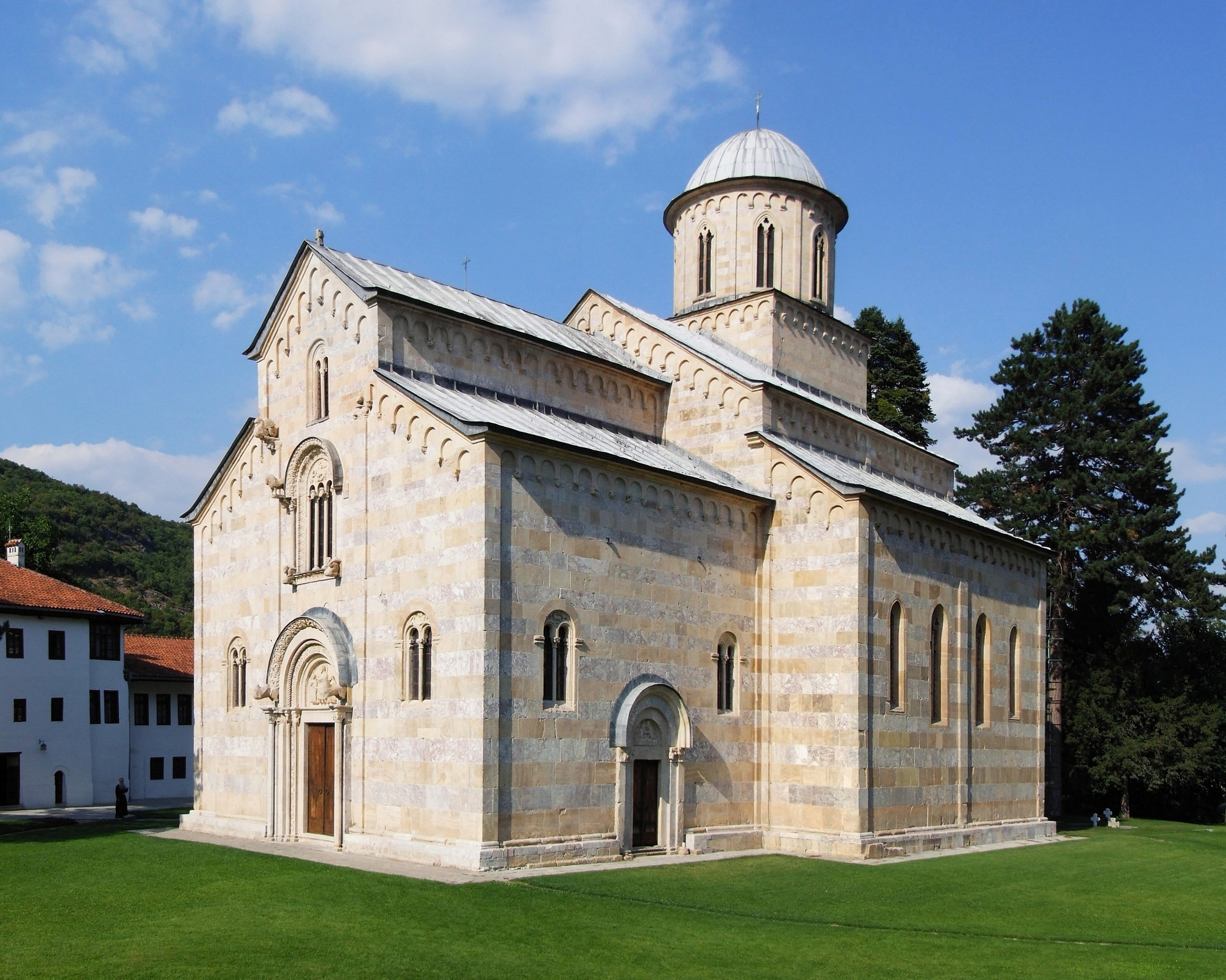
Serbian Orthodox Visoki Dečani Monastery, 14th century

Serbian Orthodox Our Lady of Ljeviš Church, 14th century

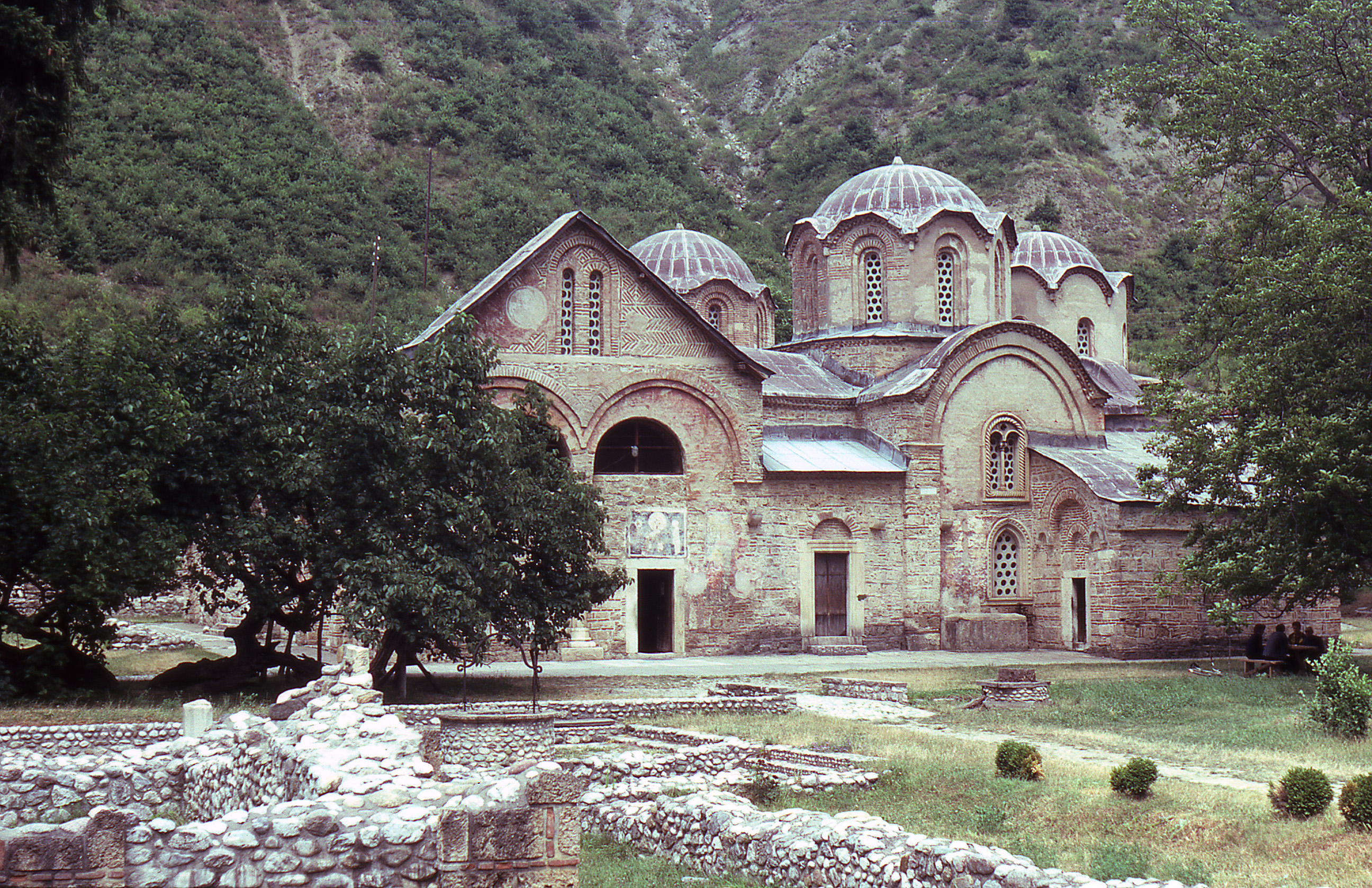
Serbian Orthodox Patriarchate of Peć Monastery, 13th century

The Eastern Orthodox Church has a significant historical presence in Kosovo, with roots dating back to the Roman, Byzantine, Bulgarian and Serbian empires.

In 9th century, The region of Kosovo was incorporated into the First Bulgarian Empire during the reign of Khan Presian. It remained within the borders of Bulgaria for 150 years until 10-11th century, when it was retaken by the Byzantine Empire under Basil II rule after half a century of campaigning. After the Byzantine Empire fully re-established itself, the region became part of the Byzantine Empire again and stayed under Byzantine rule until the 12th century.

Eparchy of Raška and Prizren was founded during Principality of Serbia Mutimir's rule, as a Bishopric of Serbia, at Ras with the church of Saint Apostles Peter and Paul, as part of the general plan of establishing bishoprics in the Slav lands of the Empire, confirmed by the Council of Constantinople in 9th century.

In 12th century, Serbian ruler Stefan Nemanja was the first who had seized the surrounding area along the White Drin from the Byzantine empire to Grand Principality of Serbia. The ecclesiastical split from the Patriarchate in 1219 was the final act of establishing Nemanjić rule in Prizren and Kosovo. During the period of Kingdom of Serbia, several Serbian Kings and Nobles made significant contributions to Eastern Orthodox Church like Stefan Nemanja, Stefan the First-Crowned, Stefan Uroš I, Stefan Milutin, Stefan Dečanski, Stefan Dušan, Stefan Uroš V, Lazar Hrebeljanović, Stefan Lazarević, Marko Mrnjavčević, among others.

On Easter of 1346, Emperor of Serbia Stefan Dušan convoked a grand assembly, attended by the Serbian Archbishop Joanikije II and various religious leaders of Mount Athos. The assembly and clergy agreed on, and then ceremonially performed the raising of the autocephalous Serbian Archbishopric to the status of Patriarchate. The Archbishop was from now on titled Serbian Patriarch, although some documents called him Patriarch of Serbs and Greeks, with the seat at Patriarchate of Peć Monastery. The new Patriarch Joanikije II crowned Stefan Dušan as "Emperor and autocrat of Serbs and Romans.

After the Battle of Kosovo, the Ottoman Empire invaded the Serbian Despotate in 1459. All of the annexed lands were divided into Sanjaks.

Although some Serbs converted to Islam, most fought to remain faithful to the Eastern Orthodoxy through their allegiance to the Serbian Orthodox Church. After several failed attempts, made from c. 1530 up to 1541 by metropolitan Pavle to regain the autocephaly by seizing the throne of Peć and proclaiming himself not only Archbishop of Peć, but also Serbian Patriarch, the Serbian Patriarchate was finally restored in 1557 under the Sultan Suleiman I, under the interfaith mediation of Pasha Mehmed Sokolović who was ethnic Serb by birth. His cousin, one of the Serbian Orthodox bishops Makarije Sokolović was elected Patriarch. The restoration of the Patriarchate of Peć was of great importance for the Serbs because it helped the spiritual unification of all Serbs in the Ottoman Empire.

After the end of World War I, the reunification of Serbian Orthodox Church occurred. All Eastern Orthodox Serbs were united under one ecclesiastical authority, and all Serbian ecclesiastical provinces and eparchies such as the Metropolitanate of Belgrade, Patriarchate of Karlovci, Metropolitanate of Dabar and Bosnia, and Metropolitanate of Montenegro and the Littoral were united into the single Serbian Orthodox Church, headed bz the Patriarch titled as Archbishop of Peć, Metropolitan of Belgrade and Karlovci, and Serbian Patriarch.

During World War II, the region was annexed in territory of the axis Fascist Italy-ruled Kingdom of Albania during the Invasion of Yugoslavia. The Serbian Orthodox monasteries was targeted for destruction by Italian fascist blackshirts and Albanian nationalist Balli Kombëtar under the idea of creating a racially pure Greater Albania, the Balli Kombëtar enacted campaigns of massacres, genocide and terrorism against Serb Orthodox Christian civilians in Kosovo. In 1941, the Balli Kombëtar combined with the SS Skanderbeg division massacred thousands of Serbs and expelled between 10,000 and 100,000 Serb civilians from the region. The Royal Italian Army responded by sending a group of soldiers to help protect the Serbian Orthodox monasteries from attacks.

During the Kosovo War, dozens of Serbian Orthodox churches were destroyed and damaged by Albanians, after the end of Serbian governance in 1999, and a further 35 were damaged in the week of the 2004 unrest.

The Serb population, estimated at 100,000 people, is almost exclusively Eastern Orthodox. Kosovo has 156 SerbIan Orthodox churches and monasteries, of which four are World Heritage Sites of Serbia as Medieval Monuments in Kosovo*: the Patriarchate of Peć Monastery, Visoki Dečani Monastery, Gračanica Monastery, and Our Lady of Ljeviš.

== Catholicism ==
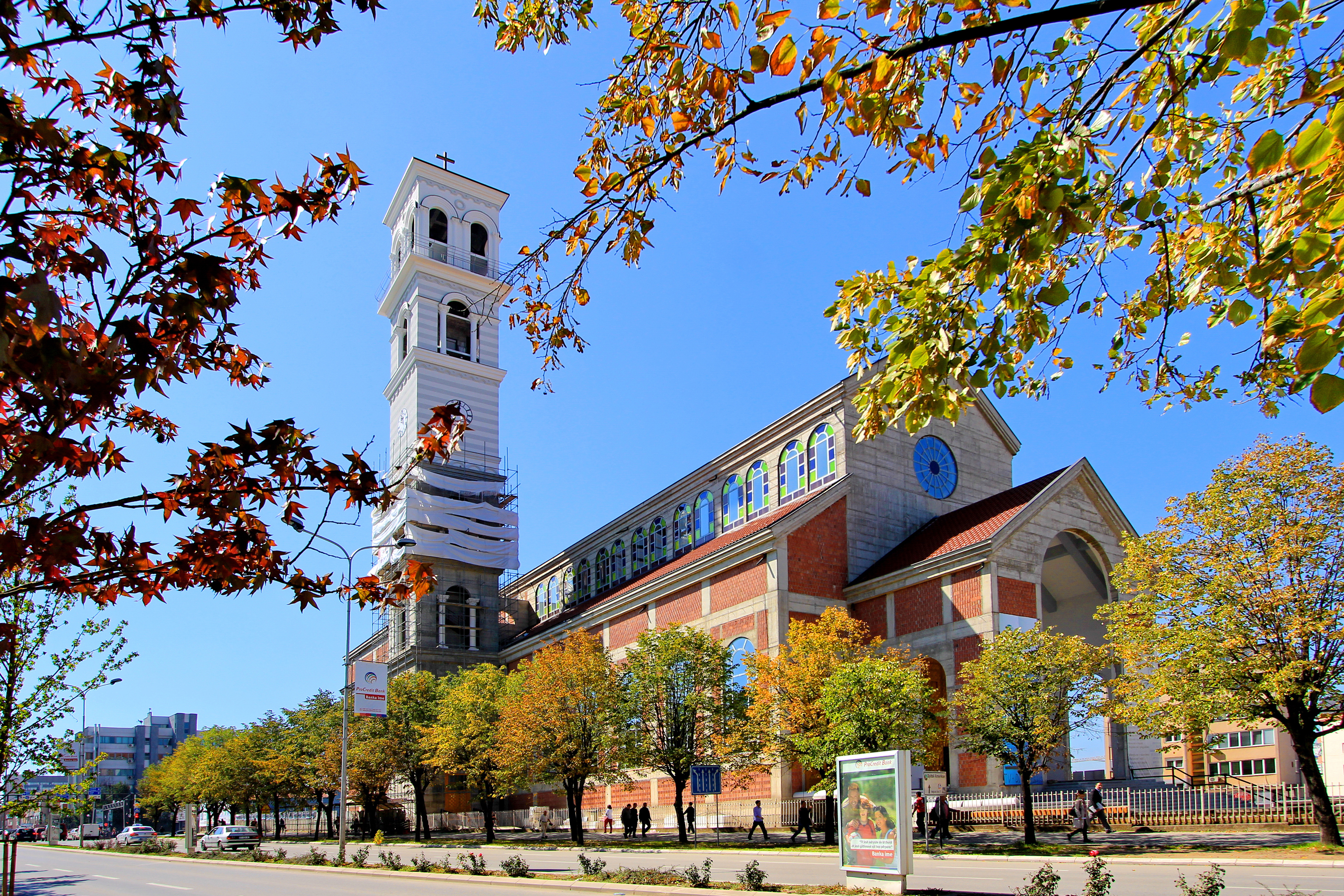
Cathedral of Saint Mother Teresa in Prishtina

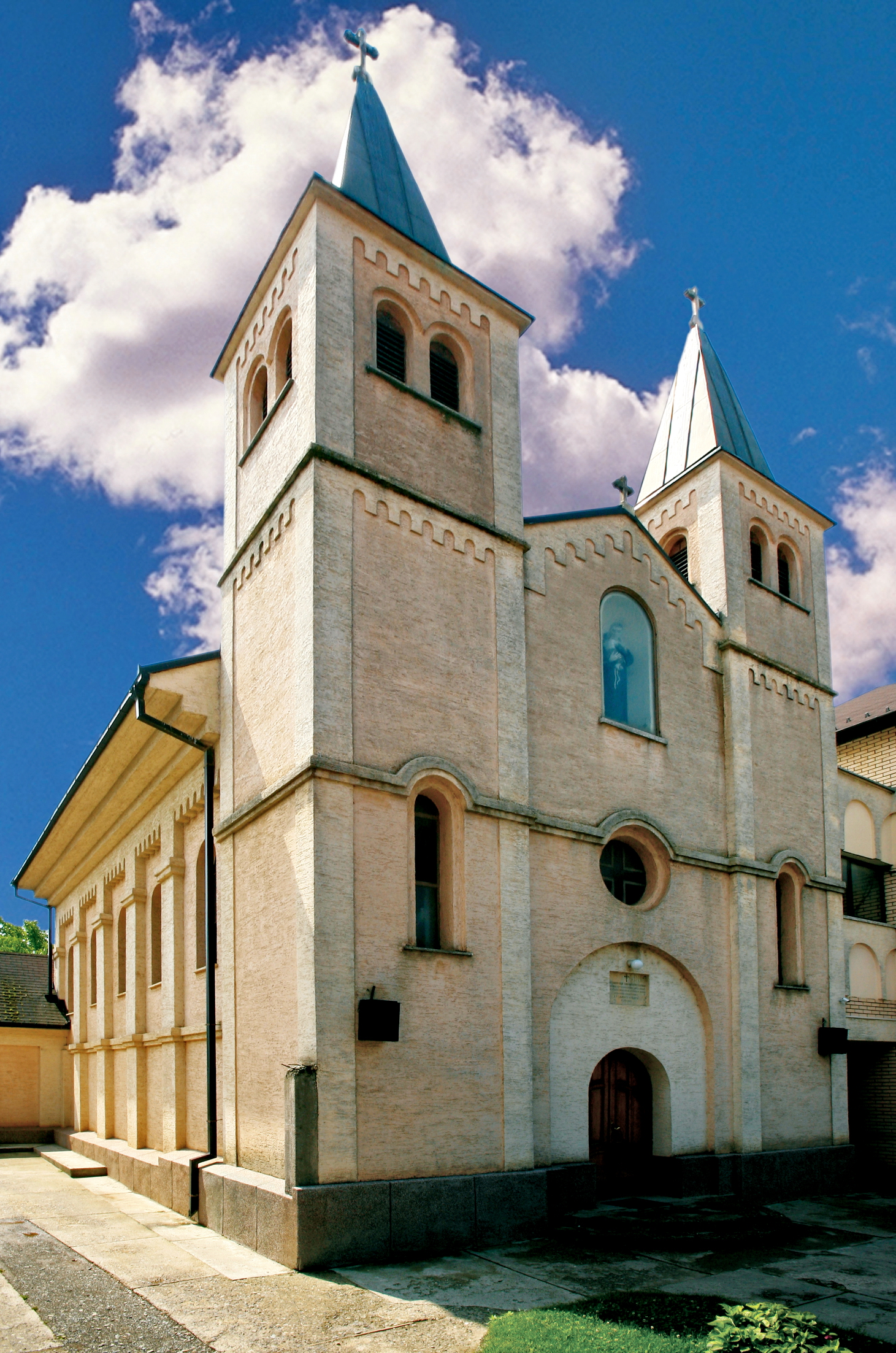
Church of St Anthony in Gjakova, Kosovo

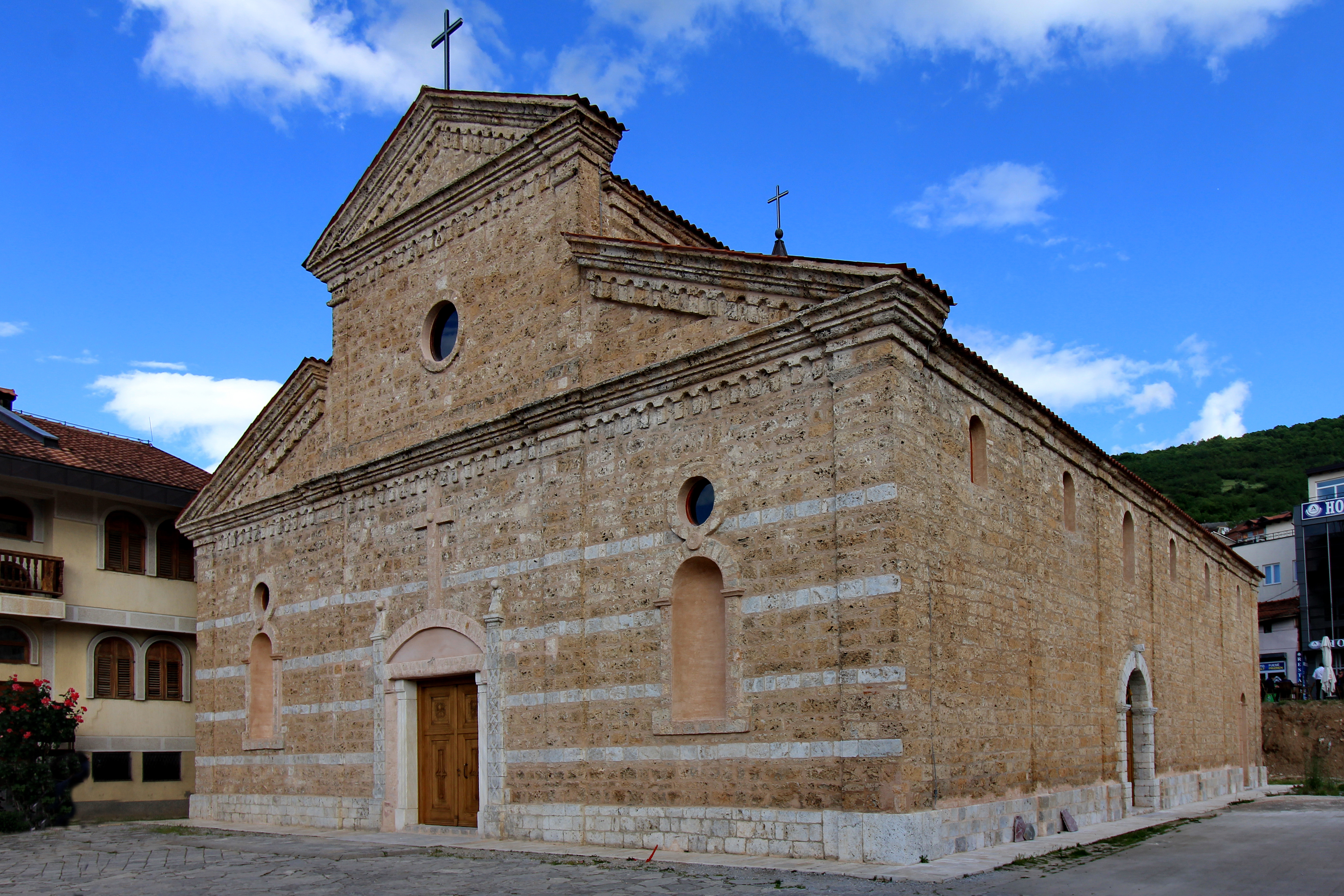
Cathedral of Our Lady of Perpetual Succour, Prizren

The Catholic Church has a significant historical presence in Kosovo, with roots dating back to the Roman and Byzantine empires. The influence of the Catholic Church grew under the Kingdom of Hungary in the 11th century and continued to develop during the subsequent periods of rule by various powers, including the Venetian and Ottoman Empires. During the Ottoman period, many Albanians converted to Islam, but a significant number remained Catholic, particularly in the western and northern regions of Kosovo. During the period in which the conversion of Catholics to Islam was fastest (the second half of the sixteenth century to the end of the eighteenth century) many converts continued to practice Catholic rites in private, although the Catholic Church banned this from 1703, and as late as 1845 significant numbers of people who had passed as Muslims declared themselves to be Catholics, to avoid conscription. The Catholic community maintained its religious and cultural identity despite the challenges posed by Ottoman rule; the resilience of the Catholic population during this time laid the foundation for the continued presence of the Catholic Church in the region. Important Catholic institutions, such as the Diocese of Prizren, played a crucial role in the religious and social life of the Catholic Albanians.

In contemporary Kosovo, the Diocese of Prizren remains an important religious institution. The community is estimated to make up about 3-5% of Kosovo's total population, translating to approximately 60,000 to 100,000 individuals. The Diocese of Prizren-Pristina, which serves the Catholic community in Kosovo, has been active in promoting education, culture, and social services. The Church also plays a role in interfaith dialogue, working to build bridges between different religious communities in the region. The church's efforts in preserving Albanian cultural heritage and its contributions to social and humanitarian causes are widely recognized. Key religious sites such as the Cathedral of Saint Mother Teresa in Pristina are central to the activities of the Catholic community. The church continues to support the spiritual and social needs of its followers, fostering a sense of unity and cultural identity among the Catholic Albanians in Kosovo.

Mother Teresa, whose parents were from Kosovo, saw the vision which decided her upon her religious vocation at the Church of the Black Madonna at Letnica in Kosovo. The central boulevard in Pristina is named after her. A Catholic Cathedral was consecrated in Pristina in 2011, having been built on land donated by the municipality. During the Kosovo war (1999), vandalization of Kosovo Albanian Catholic churches occurred. The Church of St Anthony located in Gjakova had major damage done by Serbian soldiers. In Pristina, Serbian officers ejected nuns and a priest from the Catholic church of St. Anthony and installed aircraft radar in the steeple which resulted in NATO bombing of the church and surrounding houses.

== Protestantism ==
There is also a small number of evangelical Protestants, whose tradition dates back to the Methodist missionaries' work centered in Bitola, in the late 19th century. They are represented by the Kosovo Protestant Evangelical Church (KPEC). There are around 2,000 Protestants in Kosovo, and around 19 Protestant Churches.

== See also ==
- Religion in Kosovo
- Islam in Kosovo
- Serbian Orthodox Church in Kosovo
- Catholic Church in Kosovo
- Kosovo Protestant Evangelical Church
- Destruction of Albanian heritage in Kosovo
- Destruction of Serbian heritage in Kosovo

== Sources ==
- Belgiorno de Stefano, Maria Gabriella (2014). "La coesistenza delle religioni in Albania. Le religioni in Albania prima e dopo la caduta del comunismo". Stato, Chiese e Pluralismo Confessionale (in Italian) (6). ISSN 1971-8543.
- Blamires, Cyprian (2006). World Fascism: A-K. ABC-CLIO. ISBN 1-57607-940-6.
- Çetinkaya, Halûk (2016). Zakharova, Anna; Maltseva, Svetlana; Stanyukovich-Denisova, Ekaterina (eds.). "To Excavate or not? Case of Discovery of an Early Christian Baptistery and Church at Ulpiana, Kosovo" (PDF). Actual Problems of Theory and History of Art. 6. Saint Petersburg: NP-Print Publ.: 111–118. doi:10.18688/aa166-2-11. ISSN 2312-2129. Archived (PDF) from the original on 10 March 2024.
- Clark, Howard (2000). Civil Resistance in Kosovo. Pluto Press. ISBN 9780745315690.
- Curta, Florin (2001). The Making of the Slavs: History and Archaeology of the Lower Danube Region, c. 500–700. Cambridge: Cambridge University Press. ISBN 9781139428880.
- Daskalov, Rumen; Marinov, Tchavdar, eds. (2013). Entangled Histories of the Balkans: Volume One: National Ideologies and Language Policies. BRILL. ISBN 9789004250765.
- Demiraj, Bardhyl (2002). "Einheitlichkeit und Spaltung im Laufe des Christianisierungsprozesses der Albaner. Eine ethno-linguistische Fallstudie" (PDF). Studime (in German). Academy of Albanological Studies: 23–41.
- Demiraj, Bardhyl (2011). "Rrënjë dhe degë të krishterimit ndër shqiptarë" (PDF). Hylli i Dritës (in Albanian). 2. Shkodër: 58–78.
- Elsie, Robert (2010). Historical Dictionary of Kosovo (Illustrated ed.). Scarecrow Press. ISBN 978-0-8108-7483-1.
- Fine, John Van Antwerp Jr. (1994) [1987]. The Late Medieval Balkans: A Critical Survey from the Late Twelfth Century to the Ottoman Conquest. Ann Arbor, Michigan: University of Michigan Press. ISBN 0-472-08260-4.
- Fischer, Bernd J.; Schmitt, Oliver Jens (2022). A Concise History of Albania. Cambridge University Press. ISBN 9781009254908.
- Hoxhaj, Enver (1999). "Die frühchristliche dardanische Stadt Ulpiana und ihr Verhältnis zu Rom". Dardanica. 8: 21–33.
- Jankowski, Tomek (2014). Eastern Europe!. Steerforth Press. ISBN 9780985062330.
- Johnstone, Diana (2002). Fools' Crusade Yugoslavia, Nato, and Western Delusions. Monthly Review Press. ISBN 9781583670842.
- King, Iain; Mason, Whit (2006). Peace at Any Price: How the World Failed Kosovo. United Kingdom: Cornwell University Press. ISBN 978-0-8014-4539-2.
- Lampe, John (2000). Yugoslavia as History - Twice There Was a Country. Cambridge University Press. ISBN 9780521774017.
- Judah, Tim (2000). The Serbs: History, Myth and the Destruction of Yugoslavia (2nd ed.). New Haven, Connecticut: Yale University Press. ISBN 978-0-300-08507-5.
- Judah, Tim (2002). Kosovo: War and Revenge. New Haven, Connecticut: Yale University Press. ISBN 978-0-300-09725-2.
- Malcolm, Noel (1998). Kosovo: A Short History. ISBN 978-0-3304-1224-7.
- Popović, Radomir V. (1996). Le Christianisme sur le sol de l'Illyricum oriental jusqu'à l'arrivée des Slaves. Thessaloniki: Institute for Balkan Studies. ISBN 9789607387103.
- Radić, Radmila (2007). "Serbian Christianity". The Blackwell Companion to Eastern Christianity. Malden: Blackwell Publishing. pp. 231–248. ISBN 9780470766392.
- Turlej, Stanisław (2016). Justiniana Prima: An Underestimated Aspect of Justinian's Church Policy. Krakow: Jagiellonian University Press. ISBN 9788323395560.
- Vlasto, Alexis P. (1970). The Entry of the Slavs into Christendom: An Introduction to the Medieval History of the Slavs. Cambridge: Cambridge University Press. ISBN 9780521074599.
