= Diocese of Skopje =

Diocese of Skopje may refer to:

- Roman Catholic Diocese of Skopje, current diocese of Catholic Church in North Macedonia
- Roman Catholic Diocese of Skopje and Prizren, former diocese (1969-2000) of Catholic Church
- Metropolitan Diocese of Skopje, former Eastern Orthodox eparchy of the Orthodox Ohrid Archbishopric (Serbian Orthodox Church)
- Macedonian Orthodox Diocese of Skopje, part of Macedonian Orthodox Church – Ohrid Archbishopric
- Bulgarian Orthodox Diocese of Skopje, former eparchy of the Bulgarian Exarchate

== See also ==
- Catholic Church in North Macedonia
- Eastern Orthodoxy in North Macedonia
- Diocese of Prizren (disambiguation)
