= Vinarc i Epërm =

Vinarc i Epërm Gornje Vinarce
- Village
- Interactive map of Vinarc i Epërm
- Location in Kosovo
- Coordinates: 42°53′37″N 20°47′56″E
- Country: Kosovo
- District: Mitrovicë
- Municipality: Mitrovicë
- Elevation: 705 m (2,313 ft)

Population (2024)
  - Total: 328
- Time zone: UTC+1 (CET)
  - Summer (DST): UTC+2 (CEST)

Vinarc i Epërm (in Albanian) or Gornje Vinarce (in Serbian: Горње Винарце) is a village in the municipality of Mitrovica in the District of Mitrovica, Kosovo. According to the 2024 census, it has 328 inhabitants.

== Demography ==
In 2024 census, the village had in total 328 inhabitants, all of them Albanians.

== See also ==
- Vinarc i Epërm Catholic Church
