= Religion in Kosovo =

Religion in Kosovo according to partial results, where some northern Serb areas boycotted census (2024 census)
1. Islam (93.5%)
2. Orthodox Christian (2.31%)
3. Catholic Christian (1.75%)
4. Others (0.45%)
5. No religion (0.50%)
6. Religion not Stated (1.50%)

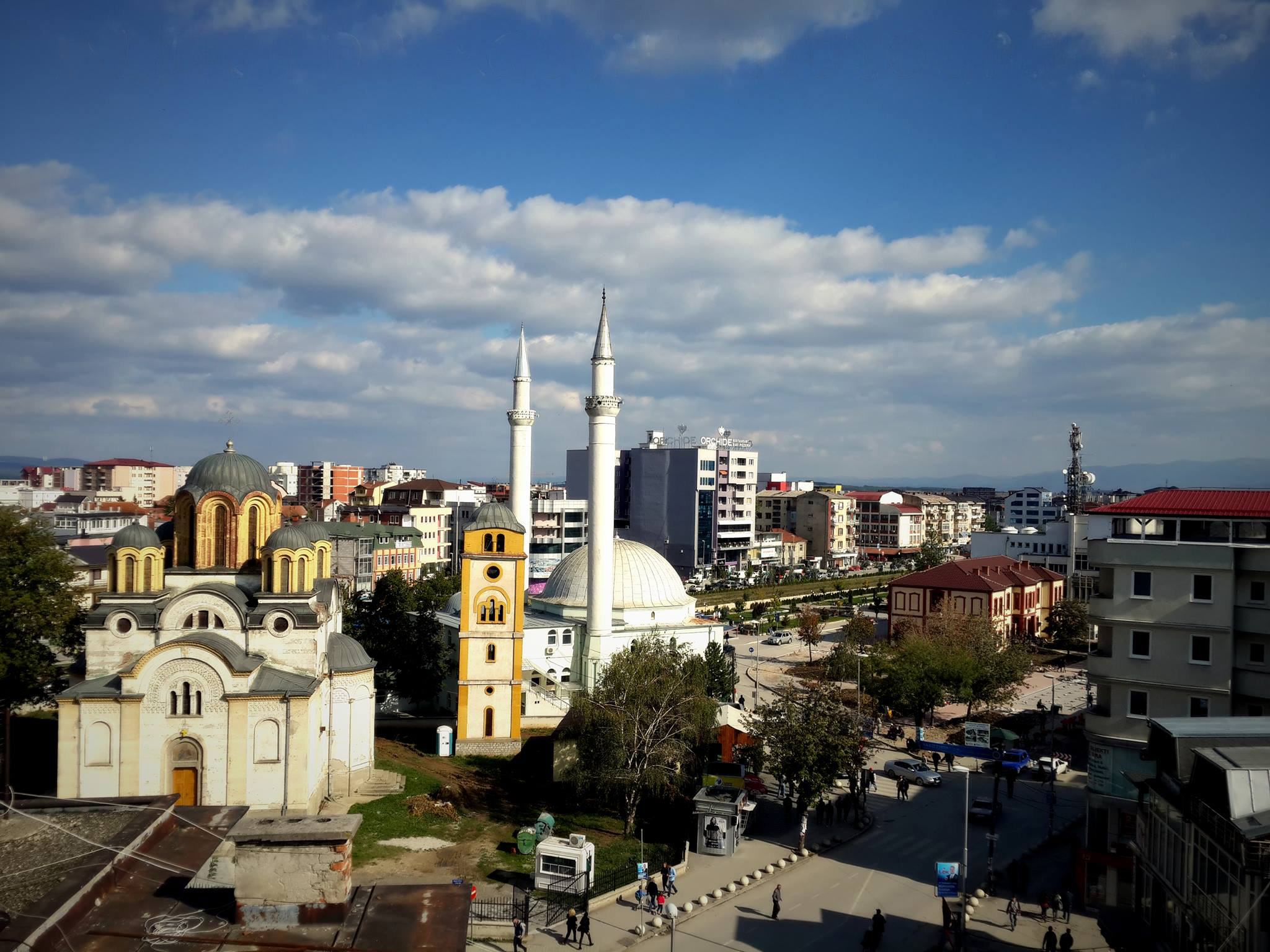
Church of Saint Uroš (left) and mosque (right) in Ferizaj.

Religion in Kosovo is separated from the state. The country's constitution establishes Kosovo as a secular state, that is, neutral in matters of religious beliefs, and where everyone is equal before the law and is guaranteed freedom of religion, belief, and conscience.

== Statistics ==
According to the United States Department of State's 2017 International Religious Freedom Report, religion and ethnicity are often linked. The majority of ethnic Albanians are Muslim, while some are Catholic and Protestant; almost all ethnic Serbs belong to the Serbian Orthodox Church. Most adherents of the Serbian Orthodox Church members reside in the six majority ethnic Serb municipalities in the south of the country or in four northern Serb-majority municipalities. The majority of the Muslim population belongs to the Hanafi Sunni school, although a number follow Sufi or Shia traditions and are part of the Tarikat school or the Bektashi order. Tarikat leaders state that Bektashis are one of nine Tarikat orders, but the Bektashis self-identify as a separate Islamic order. The majority of Roma Muslims belong to Sufi brotherhoods, a sizeable number of practising Albanian Muslims also. though a few enclaves exist elsewhere. The Catholic Albanian communities are mostly concentrated in Gjakova, Prizren, Klina and a few villages near Peja and Vitina (see Laramans). Slavic-speaking Catholics usually call themselves Janjevci or Kosovan Croats. Slavic-speaking Muslims in the south of Kosovo are known as the Gorani people.

In 2011, the first population census after Kosovo's independence was largely boycotted by the Serbs, almost all identify as Eastern Orthodox Christians, which as a result left the Serb population underrepresented. Other religious communities, including the Tarikat and Protestant, also contest the census data. Protestant leaders and those without a religious affiliation state some members of their communities were classified incorrectly as Muslims by census takers. According to the census regulation, census takers did not inquire if citizens are Protestant. Census data from 2011 identifies 95.6 percent of the population as Muslim, 2.2 percent as Roman Catholic, and 1.4 percent as Eastern Orthodox. The following "final data" come from the "What is your religion?" part of this census: "Missing" 2495, "Islam" 1663412, "Orthodox" 25837, "Catholic" 38438, "Other Specify" 1188, "No religion" 1242, "Prefer not to answer" 7213, "Skipped" 0.

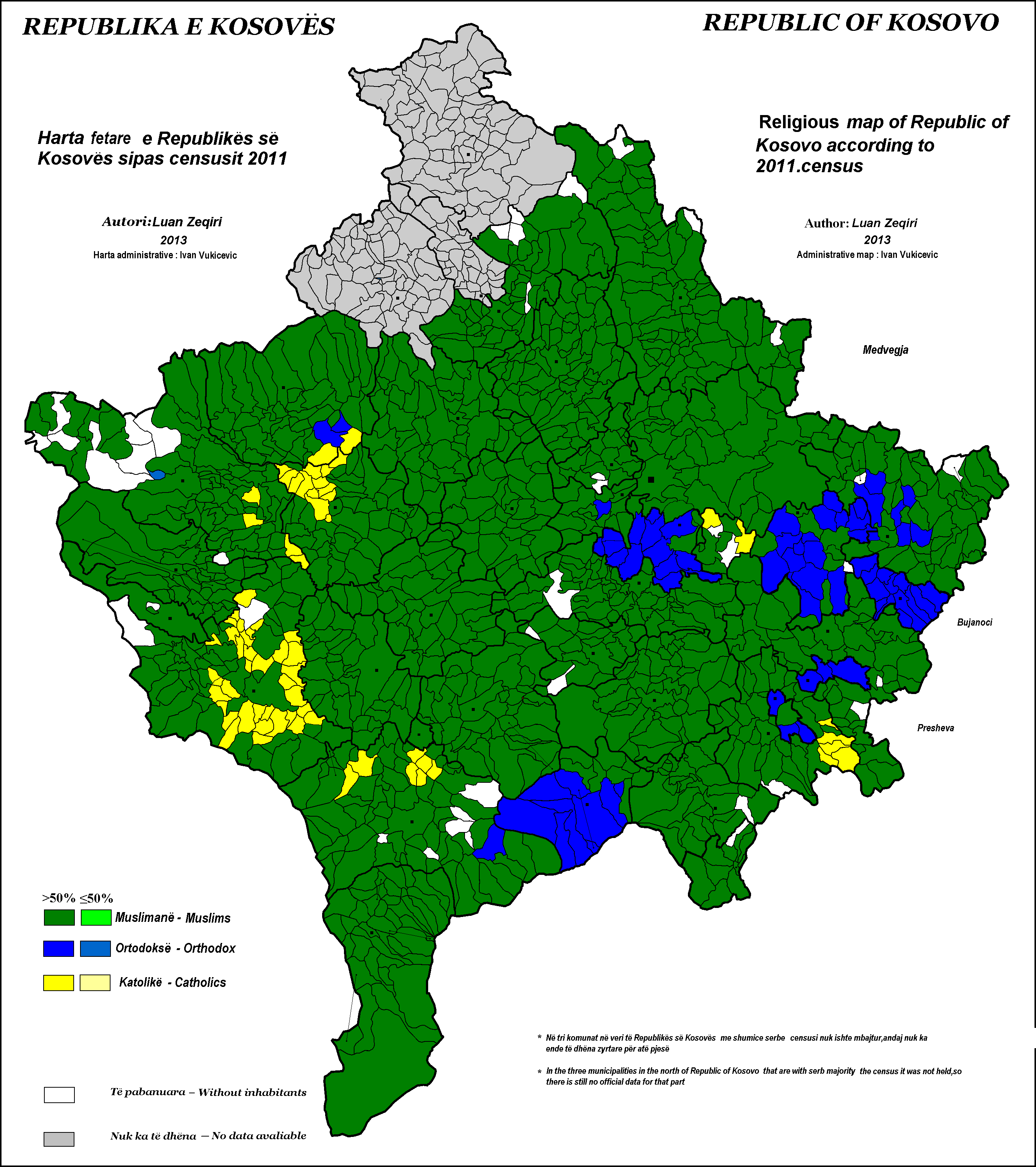
Religious map of Kosovo in 2011 by settlements.

According to the 2012 European Social Survey, the population of Kosovo was about 88% Muslim, 5.8% Catholic, 2.9% Eastern Orthodox, 2.9% irreligious, 0.1% Protestant and 0.4% another religion.

In 2010, according to Pew Research Center, Kosovo had 93.8% Muslims and 6.1% Christians (mainly Orthodox but also Catholics and even Protestants). The remaining 0.1% seem to be mostly the unaffiliated but also the other religions, in particular Judaism. In 2007, the US International Religious Freedom Report said that "the last credible census was taken in the 1980s", and that the religious demographics had to be estimated. The Report found that Islam was the predominant faith in Kosovo, "professed by most of the majority ethnic Albanian population, the Bosniak, Gorani, and Turkish communities, and some of the Roma—Ashkali—Egyptian community". About 100,000 people were Serbs and these were largely Eastern Orthodox. Approximately 3.4% of ethnic Albanians were Catholics, whereas Protestants comprised a minority of less than 1%. There were only two known families of Jewish origin and no reliable data for atheists. It is also likely that there are some Eastern Orthodox Albanians in Kosovo. However, with current tension between Kosovars and Serbs, they may feel as if they do not want to identify as Eastern Orthodox, as they may be thought of as "Serbs" because of their Eastern Orthodox status. If so, they are not represented in the census. Furthermore, the report claimed that religion was "not a significant factor in public life. Religious rhetoric was largely absent from public discourse in Muslim communities, mosque attendance was low, and public displays of conservative Islamic dress and culture were minimal".

== History ==
=== Christianity ===
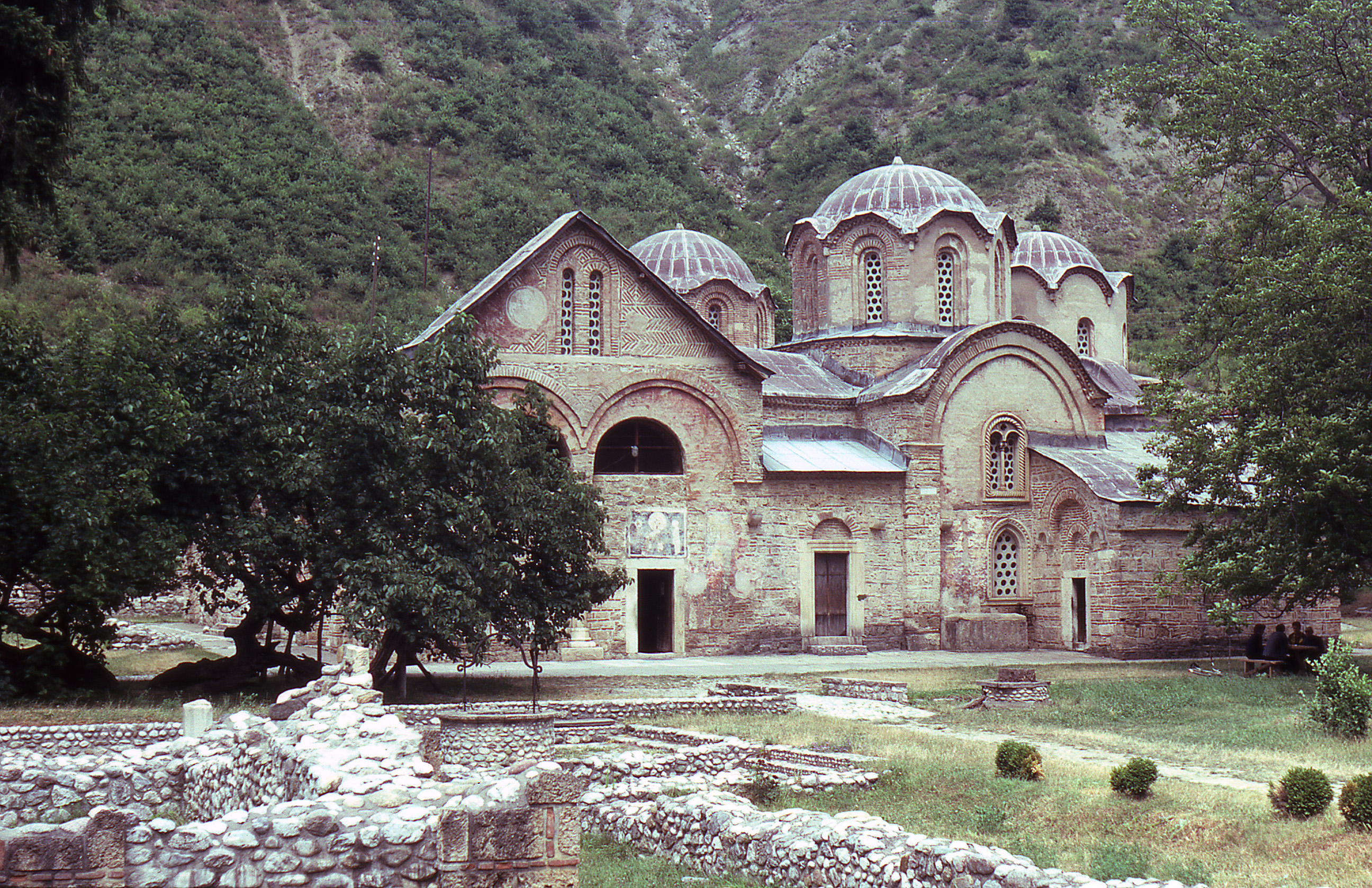
Patriarchate of Peć Monastery was the seat of the Serbian Orthodox Church

Christianity probably reached Kosovo in the 5th century as the Roman Empire gradually split into a Greek East and Latin West. Kosovo became part the former, known as the Byzantine Empire, and thus fell into the sphere of the Eastern Orthodox Church based in Constantinople. During the High Middle Ages, as Byzantine rule in Kosovo gave way to the Serbian Empire in the early 13th century, there was an Orthodox Christian majority, but also a Catholic minority consisting of the Italo-Dalmatian merchant class from Ragusa, German immigrants from Hungary and Transylvania, and probably all of the native Albanian population.

==== Eastern Orthodoxy ====
The presence of Serbian Orthodox bishops in Lipjan and Prizren was first recorded in the 10th century. The Serbian Archbishopric became autocephalous in 1219, when Saint Sava secured its independence from the Ecumenical Patriarchate of Constantinople, and Greek bishops were expelled from Kosovo. In 1252, the seat of the Serbian Archbishopric was moved to Patriarchate of Peć Monastery in Peja, thus making it the religious and cultural centre of Serbian Orthodoxy. In 1346, the Archbishop of Peć assumed the title of patriarch.

==== Catholicism ====
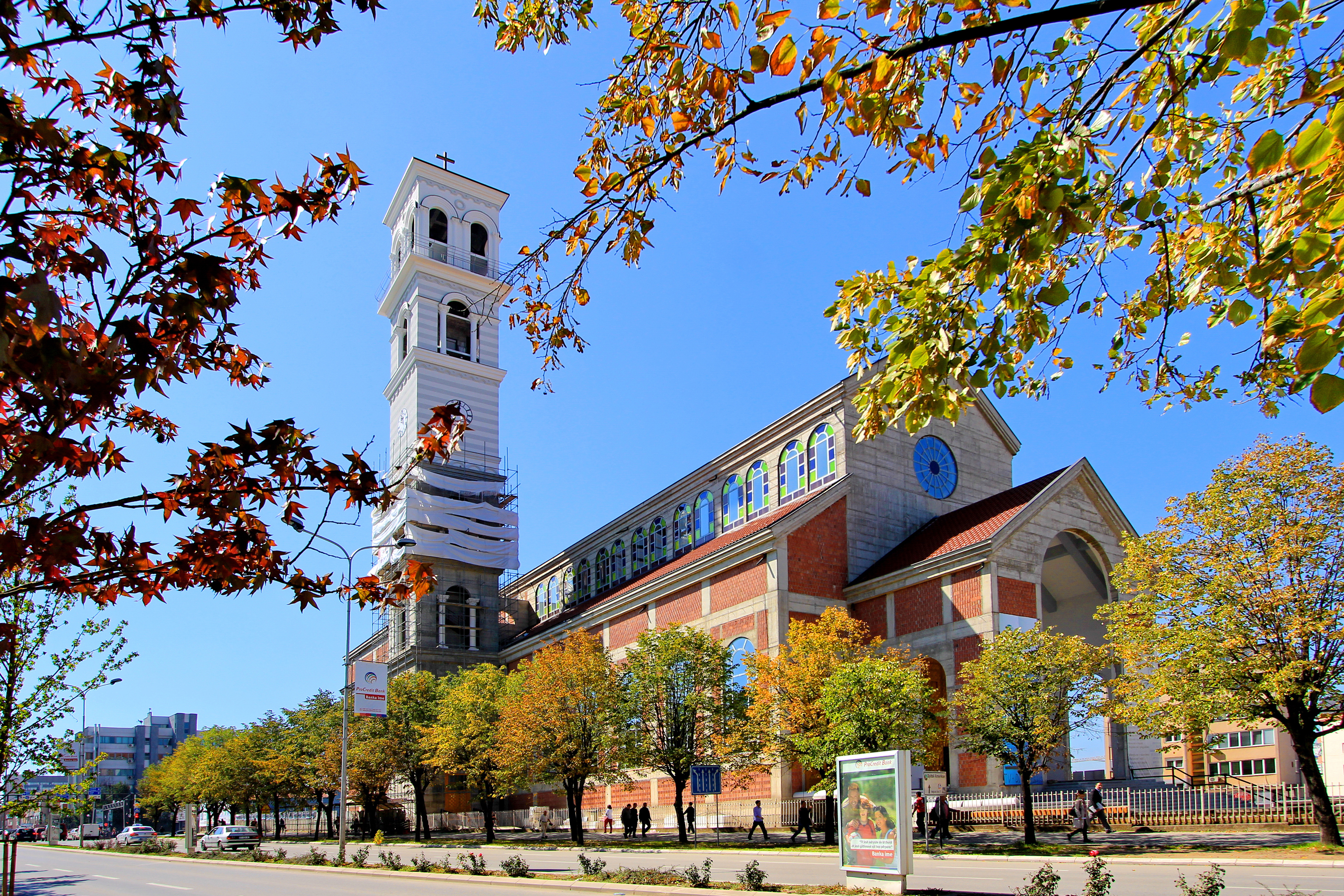
Cathedral of Saint Mother Teresa, Kosovo's main Roman Catholic church, 2013

Kosovo was conquered by the Ottoman Empire along with the other remnants of the Serbian Empire in the period following the Battle of Kosovo (1389). Although the Ottomans did not force the Catholic and Eastern Orthodox Christian population to convert to Islam, there was strong social pressure (such as not having to pay the jizya) as well as political expediency to do so, which ethnic Albanians did in far greater numbers (including the entire nobility) than Serbs, Greeks and others in the region. Many Catholic Albanians converted to Islam in the 17th and 18th centuries, despite attempts by Catholic clergy to stop them. During the Concilium Albanicum, a meeting of Albanian bishops in 1703, a strict condemnation of conversion – especially for opportunistic reasons such as jizya evasion – was promulgated. Whilst many of these converts stayed crypto-Catholics to a certain extent, often helped by pragmatic lower clerics – the higher Catholic clergy ordered them to be denied the sacraments for their heresy. Efforts to convert the Laraman community of Letnica back to Catholicism began in 1837, but the effort was violently suppressed – the local Ottoman governor put Laramans in jail. After the Ottoman Empire abolished the death penalty for apostasy from Islam by the Edict of Toleration (1844), several groups of crypto-Catholics in Prizren, Peja and Gjakova were recognised as Catholics by the Ottoman grand vizier in 1845. When the Laramans of Letnica asked the district governor and judge in Gjilan to recognise them as Catholics, they were refused however, and subsequently imprisoned, and then deported to Anatolia, from where they returned in November 1848 following diplomatic intervention. In 1856, a further Tanzimat reform improved the situation, and no further serious abuse was reported. The greater part of converts of Laramans, almost exclusively new-borns, took place between 1872 and 1924.

=== Islam ===
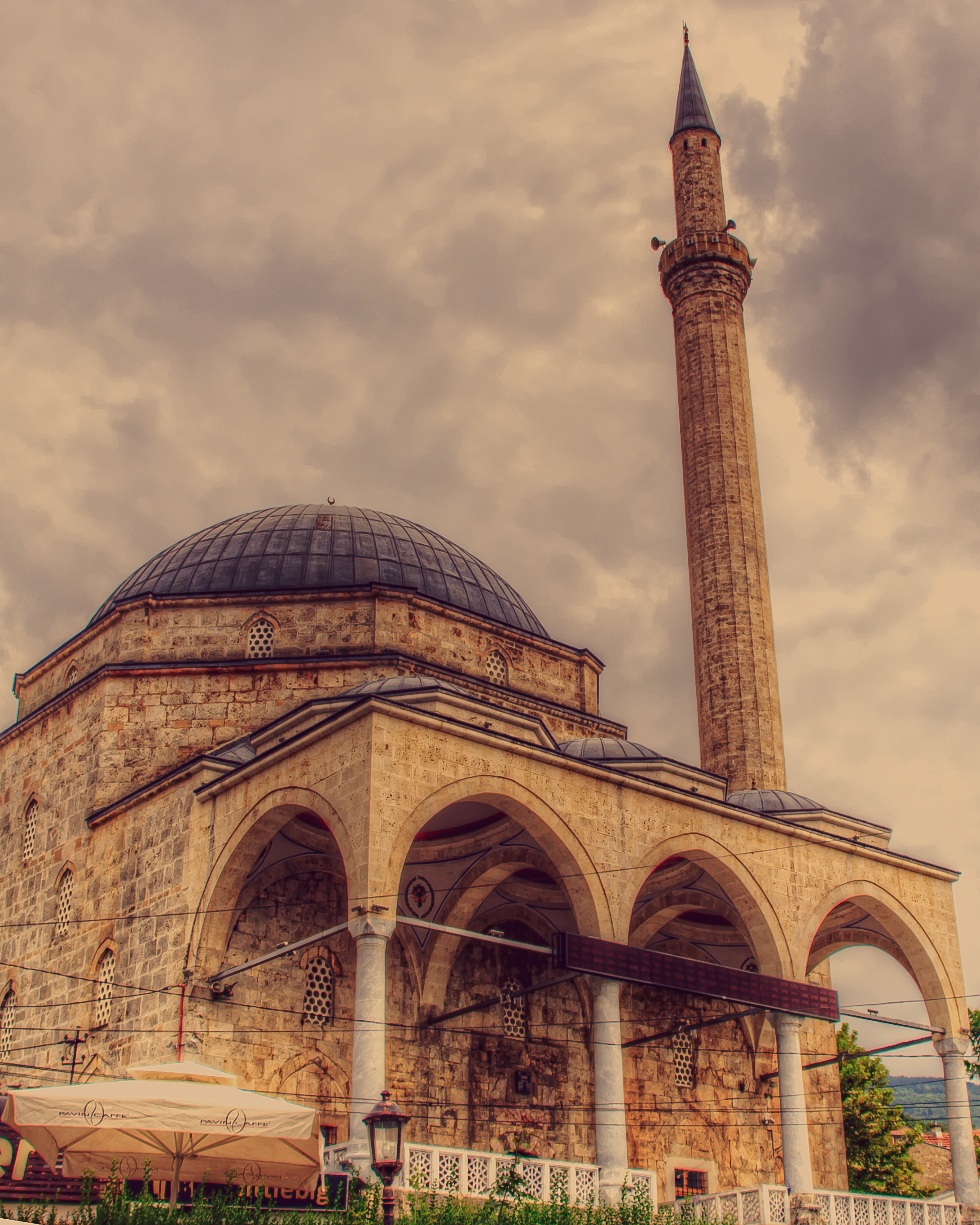
The Sinan Pasha Mosque in Prizren was completed in 1615.

After victory at the Battle of Kosovo (1389), the Ottoman Empire imposed Islamic rule on the region. Conversion to Islam was not obligatory, but had several financial, social and political benefits. Until the sixteenth century the degree of Islamisation in Kosovo was minimal, and largely confined to urban centres. The pace of conversions to Islam only increased significantly in the second half of the sixteenth century, possibly because converts thus became exempt from the cizje, a tax levied only on non-Muslims. By 1634, the majority of Kosovo Albanians had converted to Islam, although a minority remained Catholic. Besides the ethnic Albanians, and the ruling Turks who settled in Kosovo, the Roma and some part of the Slavic-speaking population (later called the Bosniaks or Gorani, to distinguish them from the Orthodox Serbs) also became Muslims, most of them, by far, Sunni; many of these belong to Sufi brotherhoods, although small a minority of Shia Muslims formed in the countryside. By the end of the 17th century, the Islamic population started to outnumber the Christians. Between 70.6 and 95.6% of Kosovans are Muslims. Most of them are Sunni.

Kosovo is not a member state of the Organisation of Islamic Cooperation.

=== Freedom of religion ===
In its 2024 Freedom in the World report, Freedom House rated the country 2 out of 4 for religious freedom:

The constitution guarantees religious freedom. However, the Law on Freedom of Religion prevents some religious communities from registering as legal entities, a designation that would allow them to more easily buy and rent property, access burial sites, establish bank accounts, and carry out other administrative activities. Although tensions between Muslims and Orthodox Christians have occasionally flared up in the past, interreligious relations are generally peaceful. In January 2023, the government approved draft legislation amending the law on religious freedom, with the aim of deepening interreligious tolerance.

Kosovo is part of the International Religious Freedom or Belief Alliance.

== See also ==
- History of the Jews in Kosovo
- Destruction of Albanian heritage in Kosovo
- Destruction of Serbian heritage in Kosovo
