= Roman Catholic Diocese of Prizren-Pristina =

Catholic diocese in Kosovo

Coordinates: 42.2077°N 20.7384°E

Diocese of Prizren-Pristina Dioecesis Prisrianensis e Pristinensis Dioqeza Prizren-Prishtinë

Catholic
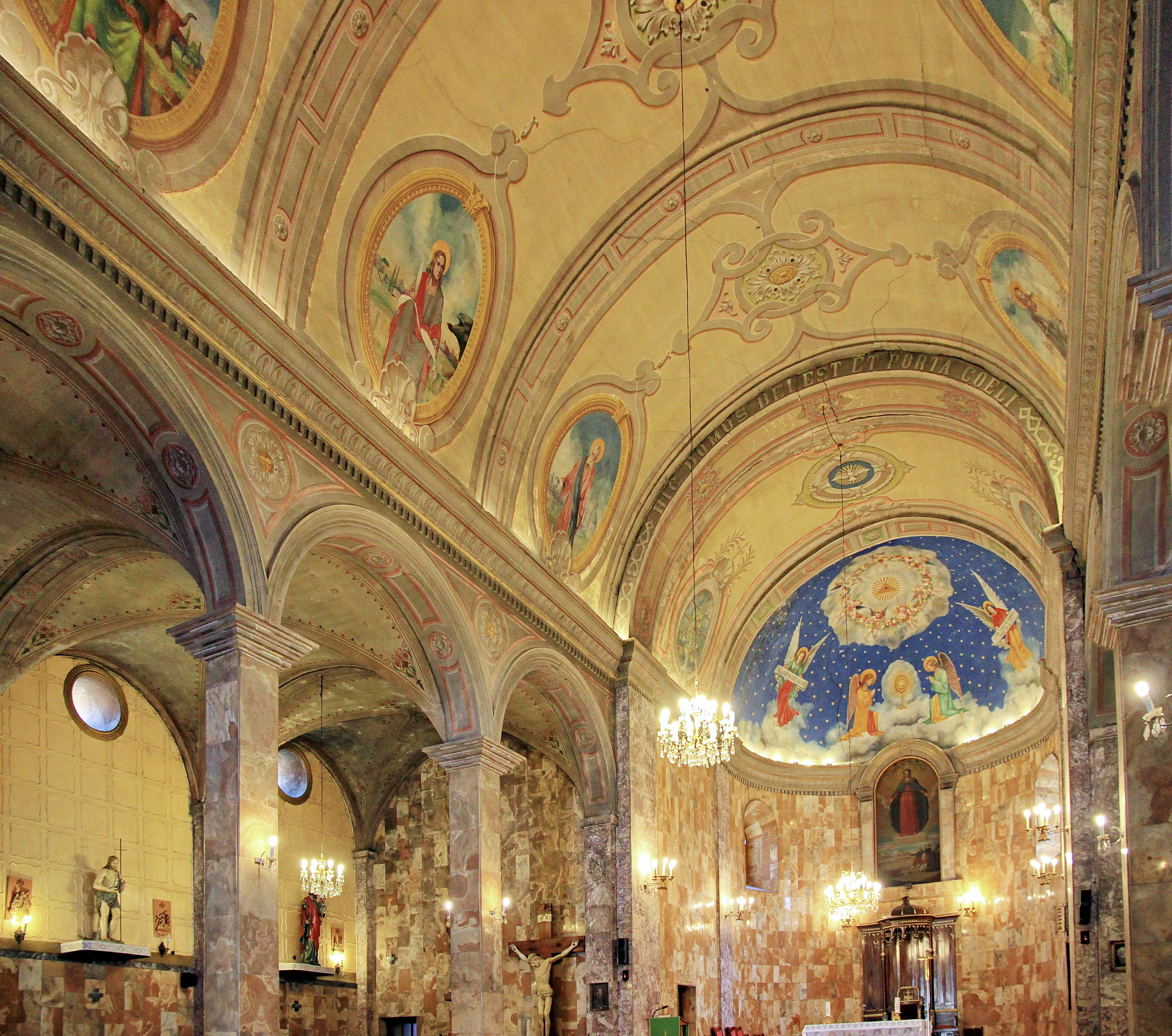
- Interior of Cathedral of Our Lady of Perpetual Succor

Location
- Country: Kosovo
- Ecclesiastical province: Immediately Subject to the Holy See

Statistics
- Area: 10,887 km^{2} (4,203 sq mi)
- Population: Total; Catholics: (as of 2024); 1.6 Million; 243,000 (16.2%)

Information
- Denomination: Catholic
- Sui iuris church: Latin Church
- Rite: Roman Rite
- Established: 24 May 2000
- Cathedral: Cathedral of Our Lady of Perpetual Succour, Cathedral of Blessed Mother Teresa in Prishtina
- Patron saint: Blessed Virgin Mary

Current leadership
- Bishop: Dodë Gjergji

Website
- www.kishakatolike.org

The Diocese of Prizren and Pristina (Latin: Dioecesis Prisrianensis e Pristinensis, Albanian: Dioqeza Prizren Prishtinë, Serbian: Dijeceza prizrensko-prištinska) is a Latin Church ecclesiastical territory or diocese of the Catholic Church in Kosovo. It is centered in the city of Prizren. It was erected as an apostolic administration in 2000, after being split from the Diocese of Skopje and Prizren, and elevated to the rank of diocese in 2018.

The first apostolic administrator of Prizren was titular bishop Marko Sopi of Celerina, who served from 2000 to 2006. He was succeeded by former bishop Dodë Gjergji of Sapë, who served as apostolic administrator of Prizren and currently serves as the first diocesan bishop.

== History ==
The modern Apostolic Administration of Prizren covers the approximate territory of the former Roman Catholic Diocese of Prizren that was a titular see known as Prisriana. During the later period of Ottoman rule in the 19th century, there were several initiatives for organization of a regular diocese. In 1912, the region of Prizren came under the rule of the Kingdom of Serbia. To regulate the status of the Catholic Church, the government of Serbia concluded an official agreement (concordat) with the Holy See on 24 June 1914. By the second article of the Concordat, it was decided that the Diocese of Skopje should be created as a regular diocese for all newly annexed regions (including Prizren), and it was also agreed that it would be placed under the jurisdiction of the Roman Catholic Archdiocese of Belgrade that was about to be created. Because of the breakout of the First World War, those provisions could not be fully implemented, and only after 1918 new arrangements were made.

During the time of the first Yugoslavia (1918–1941), there were some new initiatives towards the creation of a local diocese in Prizren. During the Second World War, the last titular bishop of Prisriana was appointed in 1942 (Ivan Romanoff), but he never came to Prizren. Only in 1969 was the name Prizren Diocese joined with the name Skopje Diocese, thus creating Roman Catholic Diocese of Skopje and Prizren. In 2000, jurisdictions were split, and the portion in Kosovo became the Apostolic Administration of Prizren, while the Diocese of Skopje returned to its former name.

On September 5, 2018, the apostolic administration was elevated to the rank of diocese but remained as an immediately subject to the Holy See.

== See also ==
- Catholic Church in Kosovo
