= Serbian Orthodox Church in Kosovo =

The Serbian Orthodox Church is the sole Eastern Orthodox jurisdiction in the territory of Kosovo, exercised through the Eparchy of Raška and Prizren. It has about 100,000 adherents in Kosovo, making it the second largest religious denomination in Kosovo, after Islam.

The Serbian Orthodox Church operates 156 churches and monasteries on the territory of Kosovo, of which four are World Heritage Sites: the Patriarchate of Peć Monastery, Visoki Dečani Monastery, Gračanica Monastery, and Our Lady of Ljeviš.

In the period from 1999 to 2004, 35 Serbian Orthodox churches were damaged or destroyed of which 30 in the 2004 unrest in Kosovo. In 2021, 46 Serbian Orthodox churches were on the Kosovo Culture Ministry's temporary protection list. In 2022, the government's Department for Security of Religious and Cultural Heritage Buildings provided 24-hour security to 24 Serbian Orthodox churches.

== Gallery ==
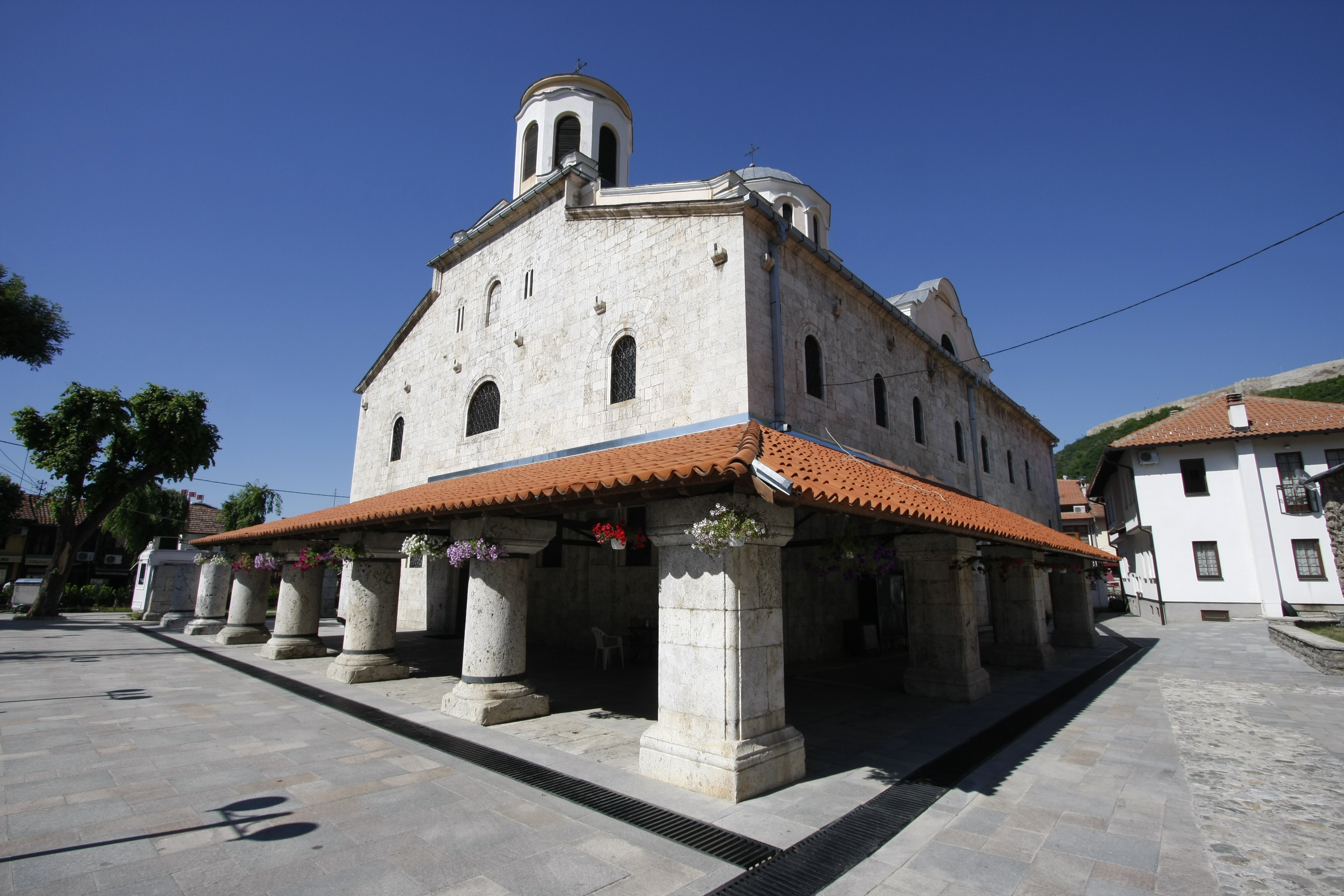
Saint George Cathedral

Church of Our Lady of Ljeviš

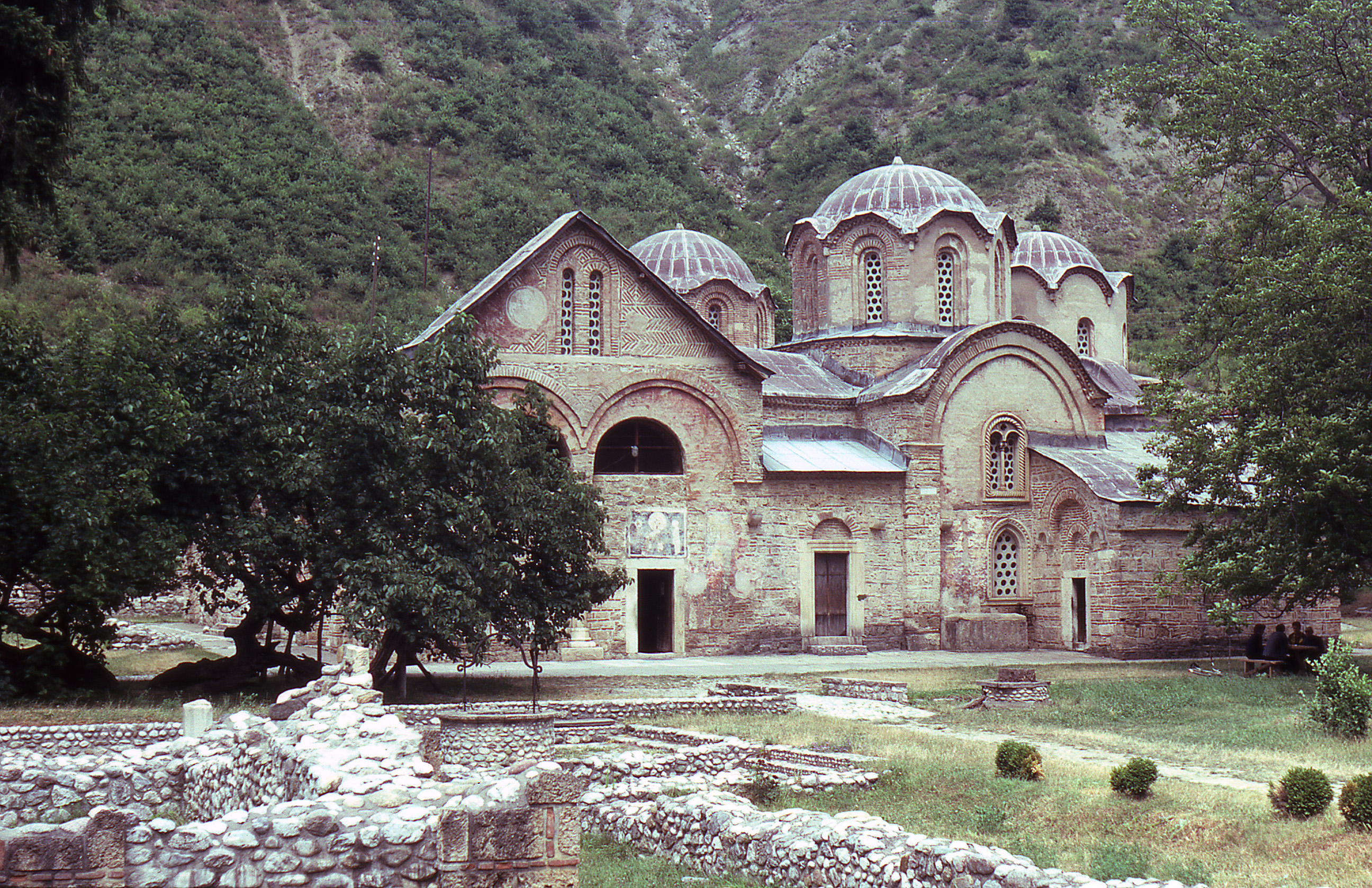
Patriarchate of Peć Monastery

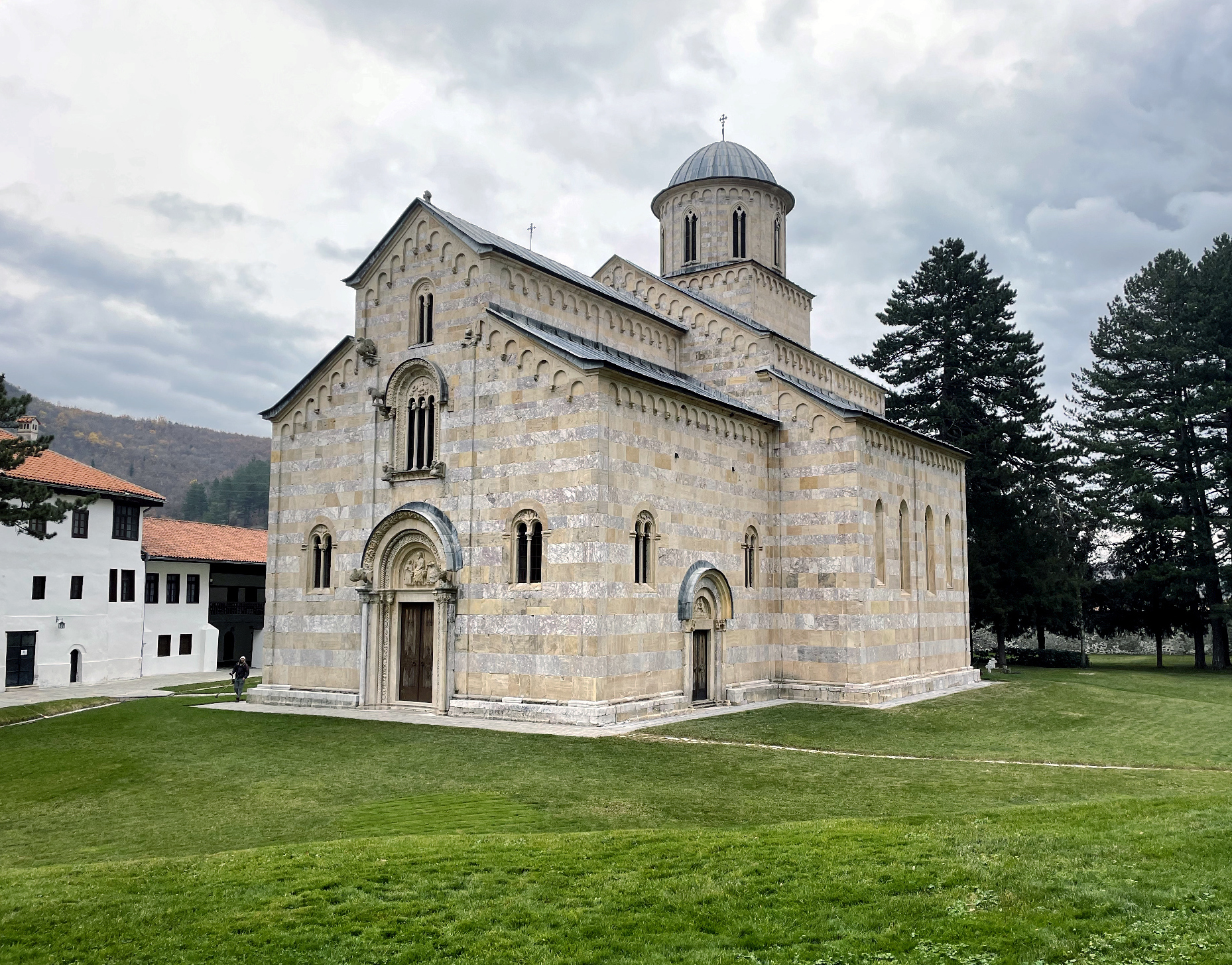
Visoki Dečani Monastery

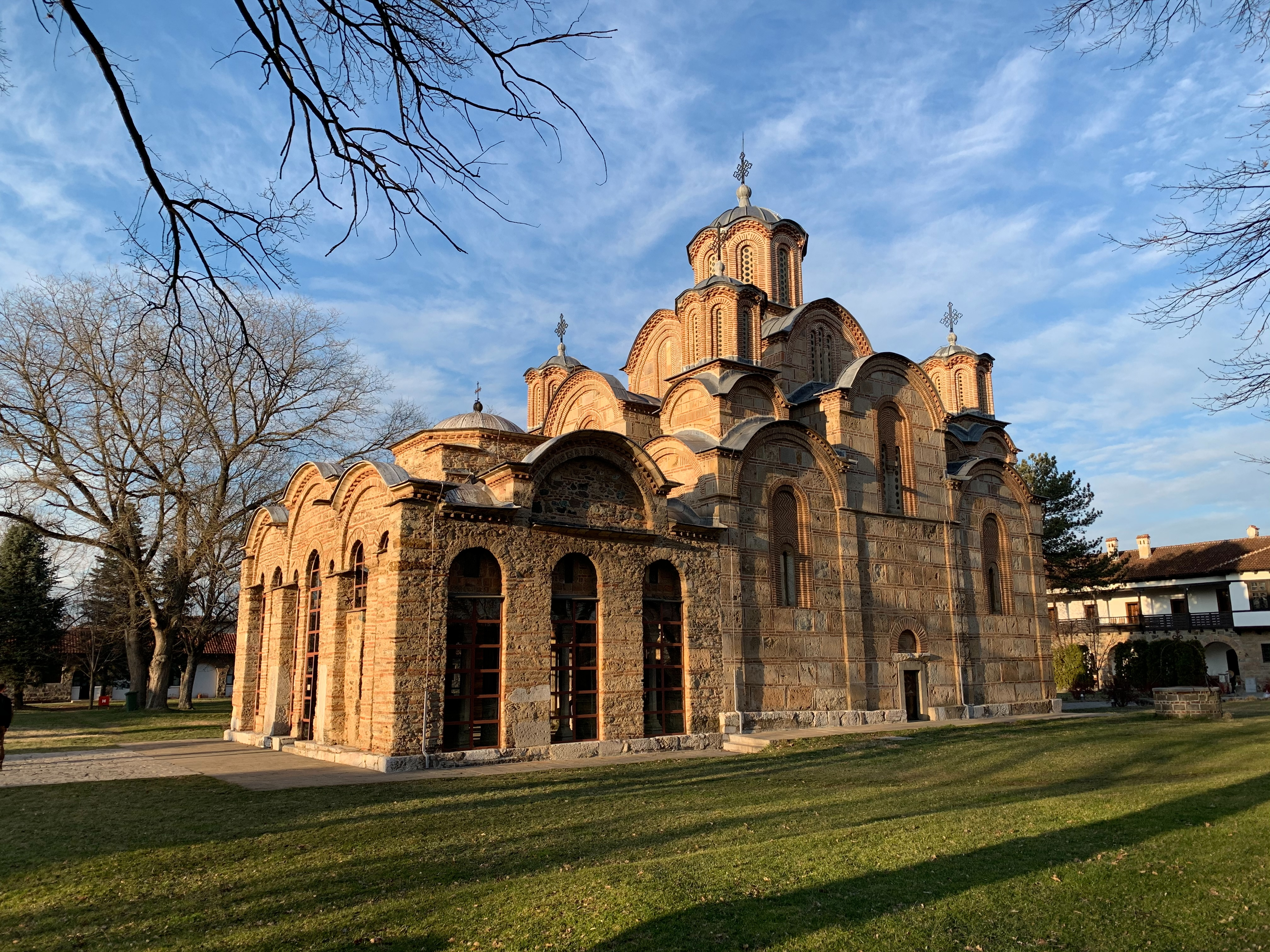
Gračanica Monastery

== See also ==
- Religion in Kosovo
- Christianity in Kosovo
- Destruction of Serbian heritage in Kosovo
