= Dodë Gjergji =

Kosovan prelate

His Excellency Dodë Gjergji
- Bishop of Prizren
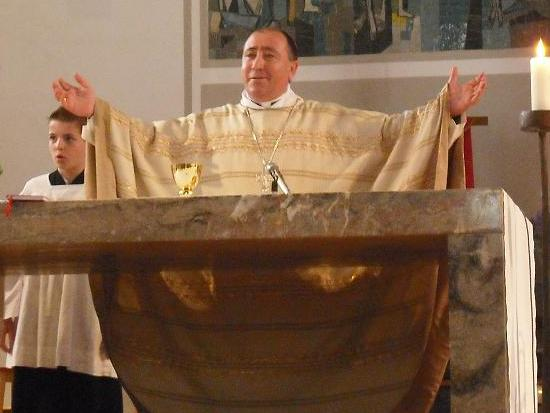
- Church: Roman Catholic
- Diocese: Diocese of Prizren
- Appointed: 12 December 2006
- Predecessor: Marko Sopi
- Previous posts: Apostolic Administrator of Sapë (2000-2005); Bishop of Sapë (2005-2006)

Orders
- Ordination: 15 August 1989
- Consecration: 5 January 2006 by John Bulaitis

Personal details
- Born: January 16, 1963 (age 63) Stublla, Viti, SFR Yugoslavia
- Coat of arms: Coat of arms of Dodë Gjergj

Dodë Gjergji (born 16 January 1963) is a Kosovan prelate of the Catholic Church. Since 2006, he serves as Apostolic Administrator of Prizren. In 2018, when the apostolic administration was elevated to the status of the diocese, he became the first diocesan bishop.

== Life ==
Dodë Gjergji was born in Stublla near Viti, SFR Yugoslavia. From 2000 to 2005 he was the Apostolic Administrator of Sapë in Albania. He was appointed the bishop of Sapë on 23 November 2005 and consecrated on 5 January 2006. On 12 December 2006 he was appointed the apostolic administrator of Prizren.

On 5 September 2018, Pope Francis elevated the apostolic administration as a new diocese and appointed Dodë Gjergji as its first diocesan bishop.

As Bishop, Dodë Gjergji is also the president of Caritas Kosovo.
