= Vinarc i Epërm Catholic Church =

Cultural heritage monument of Kosovo

- Kisha Katolike në Vinarc të Epërme (Albanian)
- Interactive map of Vinarc i Epërm Catholic Church
- Location: Vinarc i Epërm, Mitrovica, Kosovo

History
- Built: 18th century

The Vinarc i Epërm Catholic Church is a cultural heritage monument in Vinarc i Epërm, Mitrovica, Kosovo.

== History ==
In the village of Vinarc i Epërm, just 7 kilometres (4.3 mi) to 8 kilometres (5.0 mi) from Mitrovica, a Catholic church was built by the locals in the 18th century. It was used for burials and its churchyard is now part of the local cemetery. The one-sided church includes an apse with a stone arch. Late 20th century renovations include a two-layer roof covering the vault with concrete slabs and re-plastering on the façade. Up until the Kosovo War in 1999, the church was used by the Serbian Orthodox Church, and since then has been abandoned. A cistern supplies water on the northern side of the church, and legend has it that a bridge once stood nearby. During the Kosovo War, the building was graffitied inside and out, the front door demolished, and the interior plaster burned and soaked. Though not used for worship, the building was restored by the Kosovo Ministry of Culture, Youth, and Sport in 2012.
