= Cathedral of Saint Mother Teresa =

- Katedralja Shën Nënë Tereza
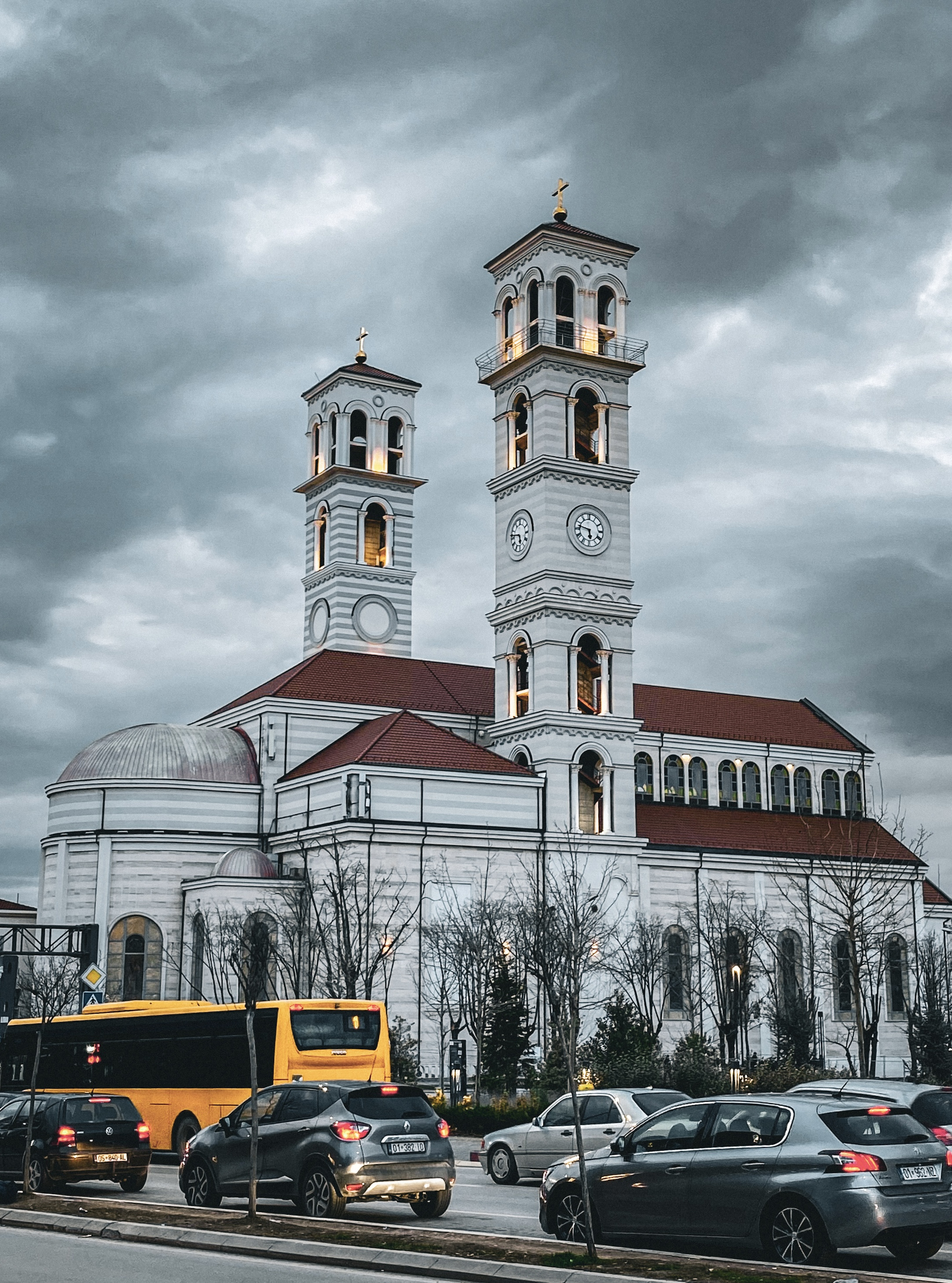
- View of the both clocktowers in 2025
- Cathedral of Saint Mother Teresa
- 42°39′23″N 21°09′34″E
- Location: Pristina
- Country: Kosovo
- Denomination: Catholic

History
- Dedication: Mother Teresa

Architecture
- Groundbreaking: 2007; 19 years ago

Administration
- Diocese: Roman Catholic Diocese of Prizren-Pristina

The Cathedral of Saint Mother Teresa (Albanian: Katedralja Shën Nënë Tereza) is a Roman Catholic cathedral in Pristina, Kosovo. In 2007, the Government of Kosovo approved plans for the building. The cathedral is dedicated to the Albanian-Indian Roman Catholic nun and missionary Saint Teresa of Calcutta.

== History ==
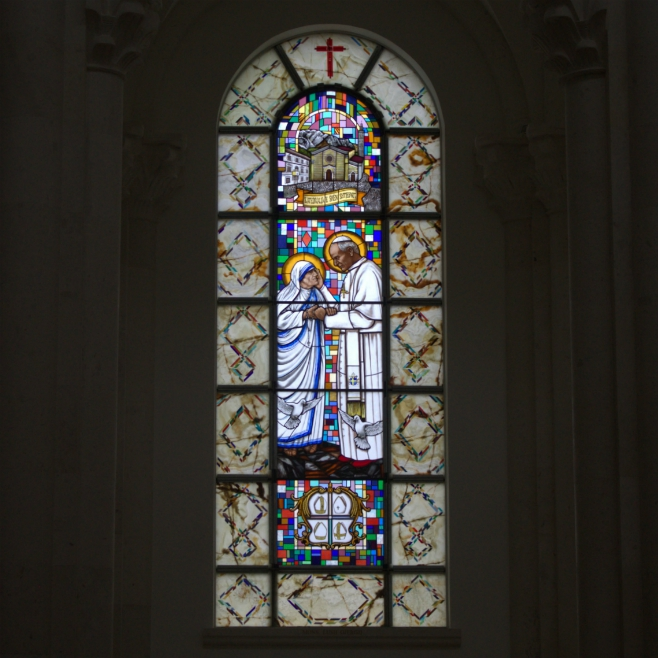
Interior Mother Teresa

In 2005, the foundation stone was ceremonially laid by former president of Kosovo, Ibrahim Rugova, himself a Muslim. Construction began in 2007. The unfinished cathedral was inaugurated on 5 September 2010, the anniversary of the death of Mother Teresa in 1997, as part of events commemorating the hundredth anniversary of her birth. The cathedral was formally consecrated seven years later on 5 September 2017, 20 years after Mother Teresa's death.

The cathedral's construction sparked some controversy in Muslim circles where it was seen as outsized considering the small number of Catholics in the area. Upon the cathedral's completion, the Roman Catholic Diocese of Prizren-Pristina moved from Prizren to Pristina. The cathedral is one of Pristina's tallest buildings.

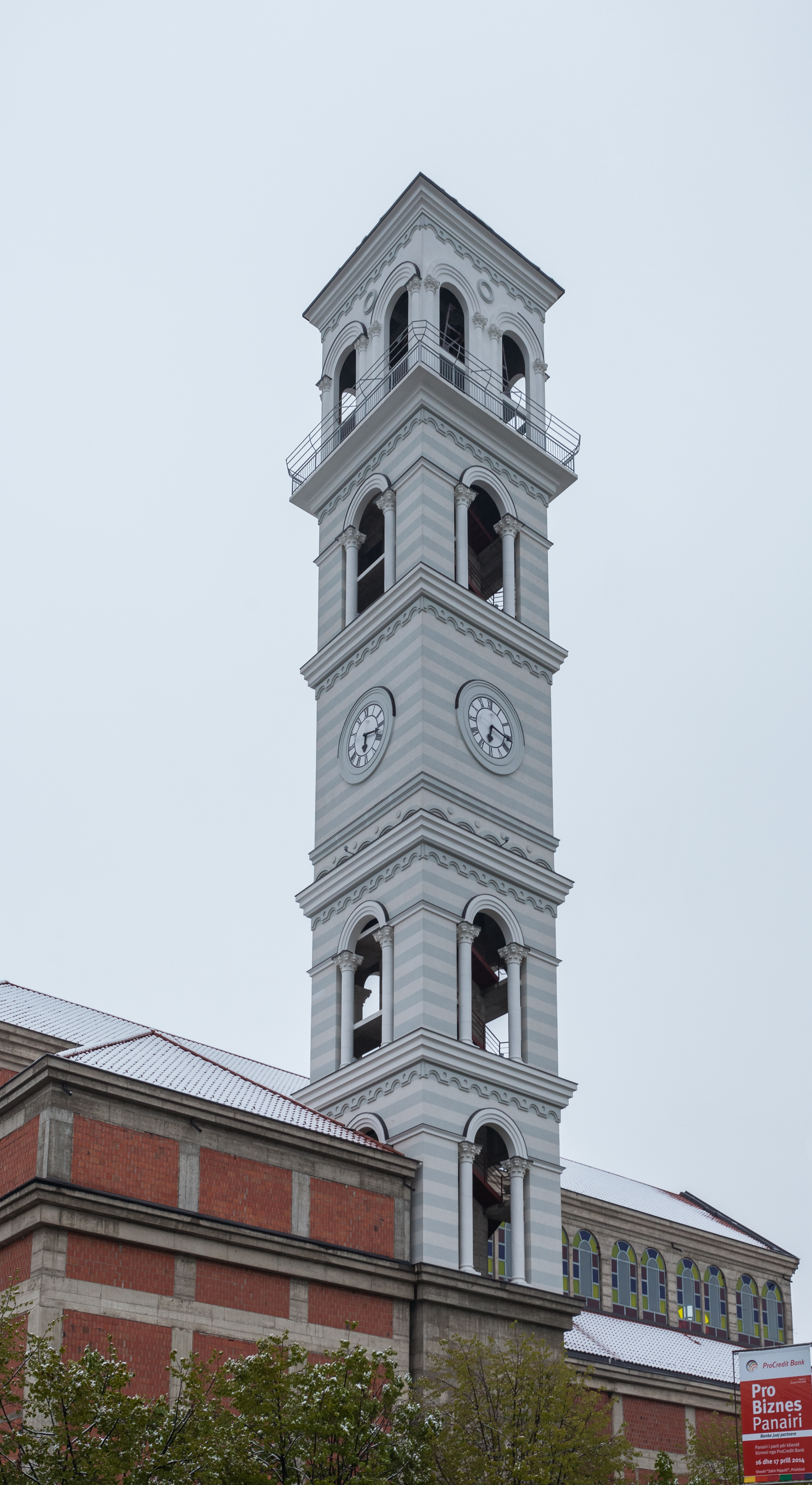
Bell tower

An exhibition celebrating the shared history of Albanians and Austria was held in the cathedral in January 2015. It was attended by the president of Kosovo, Atifete Jahjaga, and Austrian Foreign Minister Sebastian Kurz.

In Kosovo, some of the biggest Christmas masses occur at the cathedral, and local Muslims join their fellow Catholic citizens in solidarity as part of the congregation and to celebrate the holiday season.

== See also ==
- Tourism in Kosovo
- Religion in Kosovo
- Albanians
- Mother Teresa
- Pristina
- Freedom of Religion
