= Religion in Pristina =

Kosovo does not have an official religion. Like the rest of the country, the majority of Pristina's population consider themselves to be Muslim. However, religious practices may tend to be liberal. Many do fast for Ramadan and praying is widely practiced.

The small minority of Pristina's religious population that is not Muslim practice Christianity in the form of Roman Catholicism and Eastern Orthodoxy. When Pristina was in the Serbian Empire in the Middle Ages, Eastern Orthodoxy was the predominant faith other than Roman Catholicism.

Religious communities have educational institutions for their needs, organized in accordance with applicable law. All inhabitants of Pristina have the right to freedom of belief, conscience and religion. These basic rights are guaranteed to all persons in Pristina and Kosovo. The right includes freedom to hold, not to have, keep or change religion or belief. Also, it includes the right to manifest religion or belief (in worship, teaching, practice and observance), either alone or in community with others, in public or privately. The State is not expressly prohibited from interfering with the right to freedom of religion, but it is obliged to protect the practice of religious rites, traditional forms of religious life, including monastic life and religious education, as well as church property. Individuals and communities have the right to establish religious institutions and organizations.

== History ==
The history behind the religion in Pristina today shows a lot of suffering within the religious communities. Taking into consideration the fact that Slobodan Milošević practiced brutality towards the Kosovar nationality during the last war, that brutality affected the population emotionally causing harassment and persecution by the Kosovar population against the Serb community and their monasteries in Pristina.

The Serbian Orthodox Church was the church that supported Milosevic's regime but it was the career of Slobodan Milošević which made Patriarch Pavle to go public in the 1990s, criticizing Milošević even though other members which were part of the hierarchy continued to give their support towards him. After the war was finished, the Serbs who were willing to work with the international community, worked under the leadership of the head of the Orthodox Church in Pristina, Bishop Artemije. Serb forces during the war destroyed almost everything in Pristina including numerous Islamic facilities, archives and Islamic libraries. This act of Serbians made influence in the citizens behaviors by destroying the Orthodox Churches all around the place. The reason of destroying each other's monuments was mostly because of the desire to eradicate the evidence of the others presence in Kosovo than by religious fanaticism.

According to the Kosovo Statistics Agency, here is a chart showing the number of people within each religious community: .

Religious affiliation in Pristina, according to Kosovo Agency of Statistics.
1. Muslims (95.6%)
2. Christians (4.27%)
3. Non-religious (0.07%)
4. Other (0.06%)

Pristina	Total	Religion						
Pristina	Total	Muslim	Orthodox	Catholic	Other	No religion	Prefer not to answer	Not Available
Total	198,897	193,474	480	1,170	344	660	2,388	381
Male	99,361	96,375	221	558	181	334	1,168	164
Female	99,536	96,739	259	612	163	326	1,220	217

== Islamic Community ==
Islamic Community of Kosovo (Albanian:Bashkësia Islame e Kosovës) is an institution or a community, which is independent for Kosovar Muslims. This community aims to organize the life of Muslims in Kosovo on the basis of Islamic law, which under their responsibility itself has mosques and imams of these mosques, madrases and an Islamic science faculty in Kosovo. Madras, as a high school, is recognized equivalently with all Islamic universities around the world, as well as other non-Islamic universities in the country and world. Graduates of this school, how havedoctorate degrees, and masters, and are different scientific workers, theologians, doctors, engineers, etc., scattered throughout all corners of the world. Madras's home in Pristina, is a modern school, equipped with computer rooms, language labs, a sports hall and a library, in which have stored old manuscripts from the centuries before of our Islamic and national past. Madras-ah also has a dormitory which can accommodate 270 students and a canteen for food. Madras-ah students also bring their booklet "Nurul Quran-Drita". During the recent war in Kosovo, 16 madras-ants were martyr on the battlefield.

=== Secondary "Alauddin" Madras-ah in Pristina ===
Madras-ah started work in 1951, and operates several separate physical parallel; the boys in Prizren and Gjilan, and the girls in Pristina and Prizren. Madrasas has on average about 700 students. Since its founding, the madrases have graduated over 2,000 students. Madras's for decades served as the only educational institution where staff are educated by all Albanian territories and Sandzak. Learning that the foundation is developed only in Albanian. Since 1966 at this madras "Madras Students Association Middle Alauddin", according to their regulations, aims "to work on deepening and strengthening students love towards Islam, the people and the fatherland". This association has a literary section, lecture department, drama, and sports. The Association deals with the organization of the leisure of students. With its initiative at this madras there are races organized annually: chess, basketball, tennis, table tennis, and karate. It enjoys a good reputation among other schools in Pristina and is treated as a secondary vocational school with equal treatment with other sister professional schools in Pristina. Madras maintains cooperation with educational institutions such as the: University of Pristina, the Faculty of Agriculture, the Association of Kosovo Charter, and the Council of Solidarity at LDK etc. Association of Students of Madras-ah "Alauddin" in Pristina has its own body "Drita", a magazine of 32 pages.

== Islam in Pristina ==
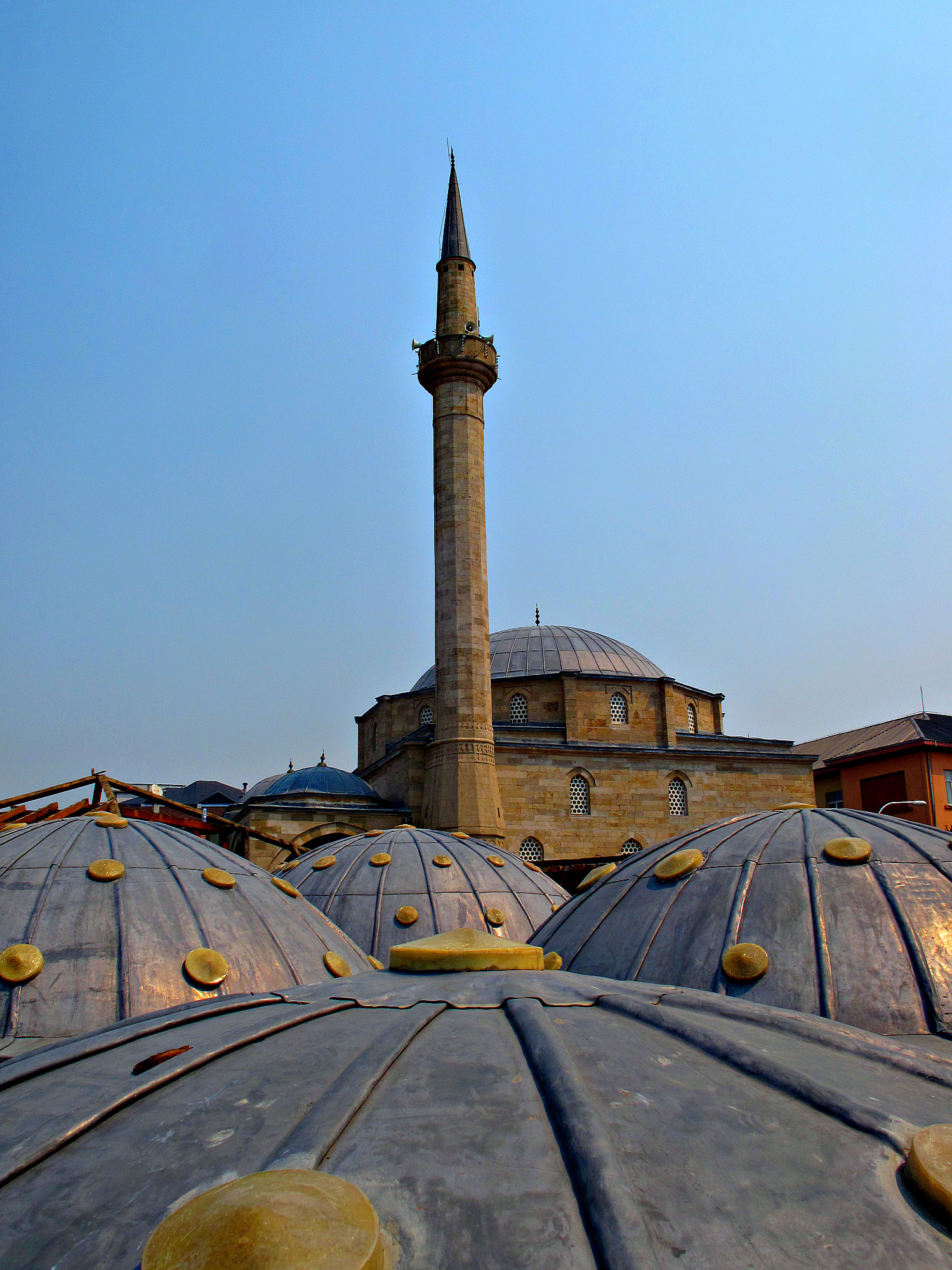
The Great Mosque in Pristina, Kosovo

Islam in Pristina began to be spread very early, during the Ottoman Rule. Before the Battle of Kosovo in 1389 the whole Balkan was Christianized by the Western and Eastern Roman Empire.From that time until 1912 Kosovo was governed by the Ottoman Empire resulting in high level of Islamization. But during the Yugoslavian Rule the population became largely secularized. Islam was introduced to Europe via two main Peninsulas, the Iberian and the Balkan peninsula. With influences from Muslim Spain (Andalusia) from the west, the Mediterranean coast and Sicily from the south, and lastly Muslim Pechenegs of Hungary from the north-east, Islam penetrated easily even to the most inner parts of the Balkans. One well known Muslim geographer, historian and cartographer Al Idrisi (1154) provided information about traveling to Constantinople from Albanian lands and vice versa. This made a huge impact on trading between the two civilizations.

Despite claims that might rise about radicalism or radicals movements in Kosovo, however, the presence of many international, mainly European, organizations hold that Kosovo Muslims do not define their national identity through religion, but through language and have a relatively relaxed approach towards the observance of the forms of Islam. Today, over 90% of Kosovo's population are from Muslim family backgrounds, most of whom are ethnic Albanians. Despite this there are also Slavic speaking Muslims such as Bosnians Gorani Turks and even a low percentage of Serbs. By the year 1993 there were 607 mosques in Kosovo. The majority of them date from the Ottoman Empire. According to Herscher and Riedlmayer one third of the 607 mosques were destroyed during the conflicts of 1998–99.As of 1993, there were 607 mosques in Kosovo: 528 congregational mosques of which 498 were actively used; and 79 smaller mosques were 70 were actively used. According to Herscher and Riedlmayer one-third of the 607 mosques counted in 1993 were destroyed or damaged during the 1998-99 conflict.

=== Historical Islamic Monuments in Pristina ===
==== Imperial Mosque ====
The Imperial Mosque, listed since 1953, It was built in the years 1460-1461 by Sultan Mehmet II al-Fatih - Conqueror, only eight years after the fall of Constantinople. It is located in the heart of the old city center, and is the largest mosque and most prominent in Pristina. Its cupola was once the largest in the region, while today it is the only mosque built by Sultan Mehmet II that still survives in these areas. The square in front of the Mosque King has always been known for meetings. In 1682–83, under the rule of Sultan Mehmet IV, the mosque was restored, the minaret is repaired again after earthquake in 1955. This mosque has suffered from deterioration and unprofessional in its restoration; poor infrastructure in surroundings creates and destroys moisture in walls stones.

==== Llapi Mosque of Prishtina ====
One of the oldest religious buildings in Pristina is the Llapi Mosque. It was built in the year 1470. Historically, it is also known as the Ramadan Mosque and belongs to the Ottoman Period.

==== Pirinaz Mosque ====
The Pirinaz Mosque was built of the same stone as well as the King's Mosque (Fatih). It was built about a hundred years later, in the second 16th century. Its founder, man Piri called Nazir, served as vizier during two Ottoman Sultans rule. According to some local legend 'Stone of Lazarus', which is found in the garden of the mosque, is the cornerstone on which Lazar was beheaded in 1389. Before his body moved to Ravaniqit Monastery, Prince Lazar was buried in the Mosque Pirinaz with the permission of Sultan Bayazid.

==== Çarshi Mosque ====
The Çarshi Mosque marks the beginning of the Old City. It was built in the early 15th century by Sultan Bayazid to commemorate the victory of the Ottoman forces in 1389. This mosque is the oldest building in Pristina today. In the past, Bazaar Mosque covered bazaar Pristina. Today there is nothing left of the old bazaar, just name Bazaar Mosque serves us to commemorate it. Many subsequent changes for its repair have changed appearance of the originality of this mosque, but its symbol - topped minaret - has survived for more than 600 years.

==== Jashar Pasha Mosque ====
The Jashar Pasha Mosque is named after Mehmet Yasar. According to inscriptions inside the mosque, it was built in 1834. Original gate is broken left to an expansion of the road Nazim Gafurri. In general, the building is risk of damage from moisture entering from cracks of different walls.

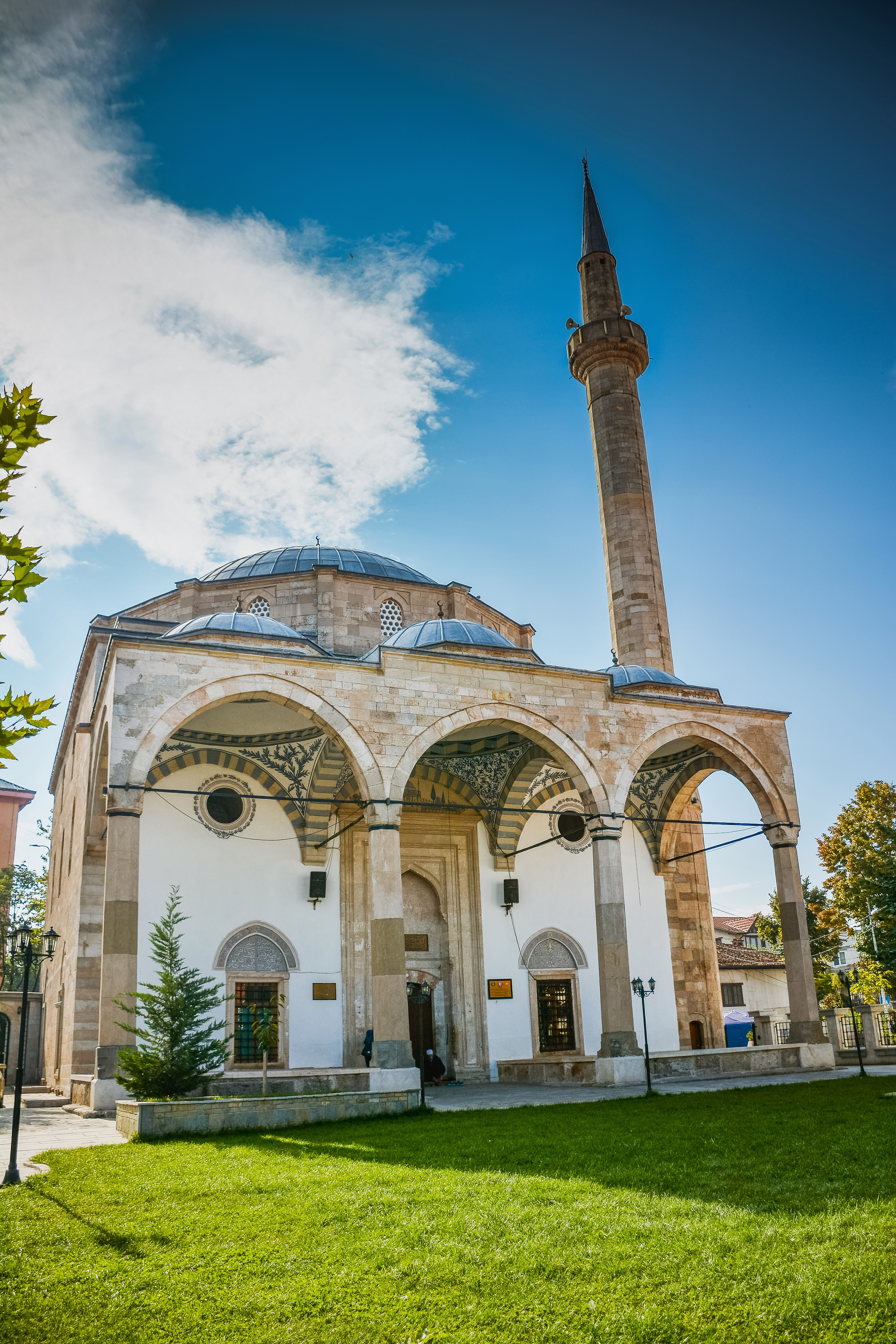
Imperial Mosque

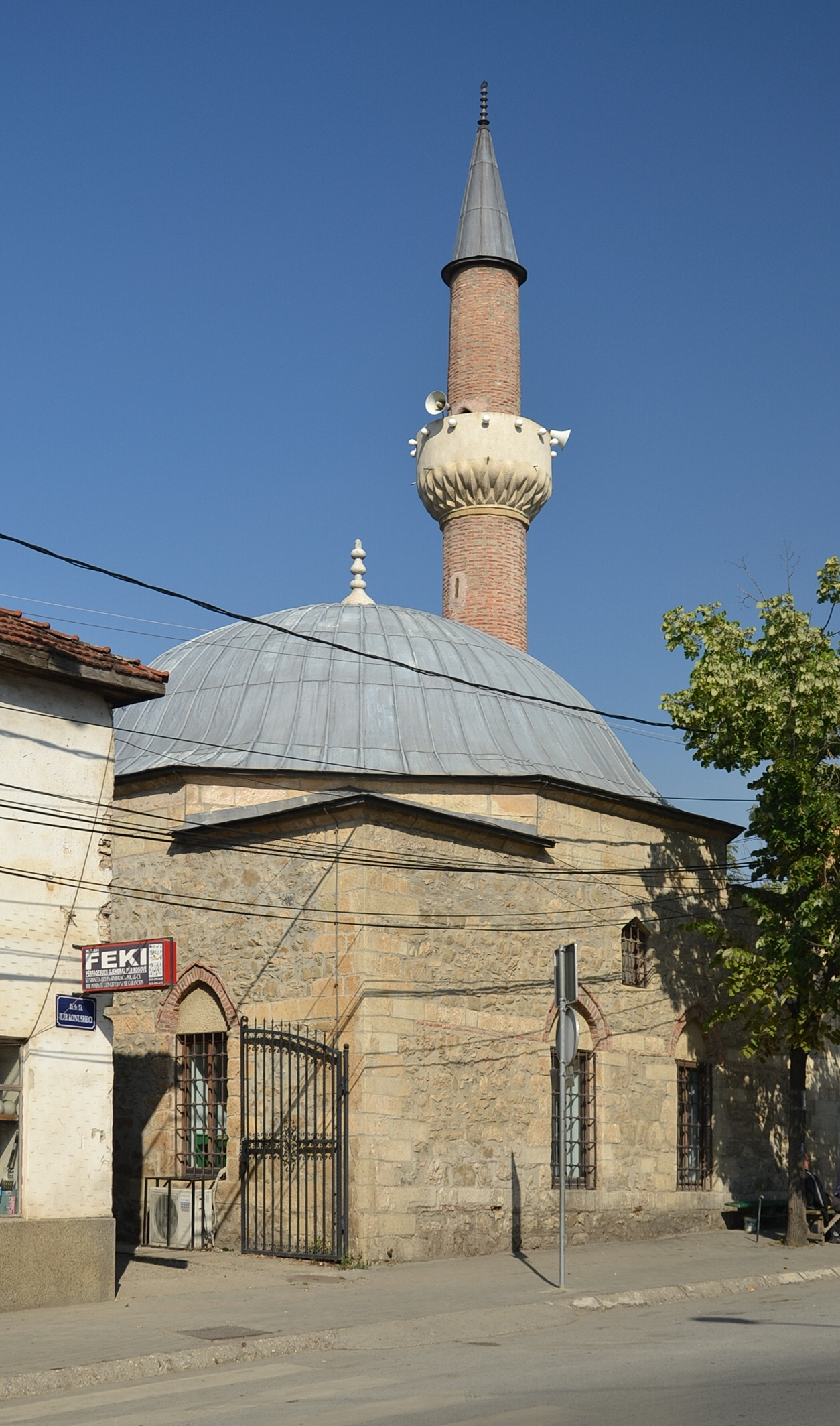
Llapi Mosque

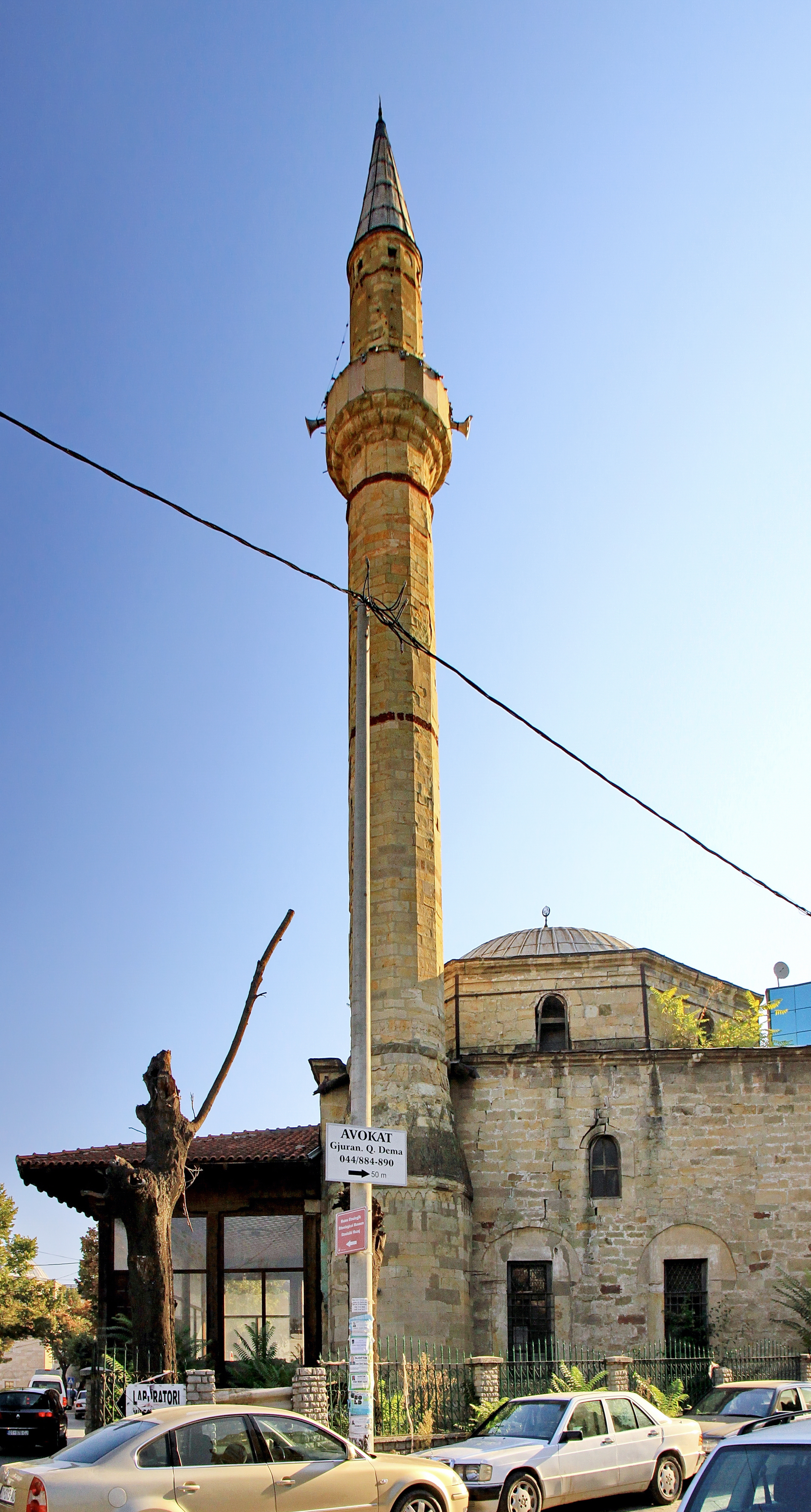
Jashar Pasha Mosque

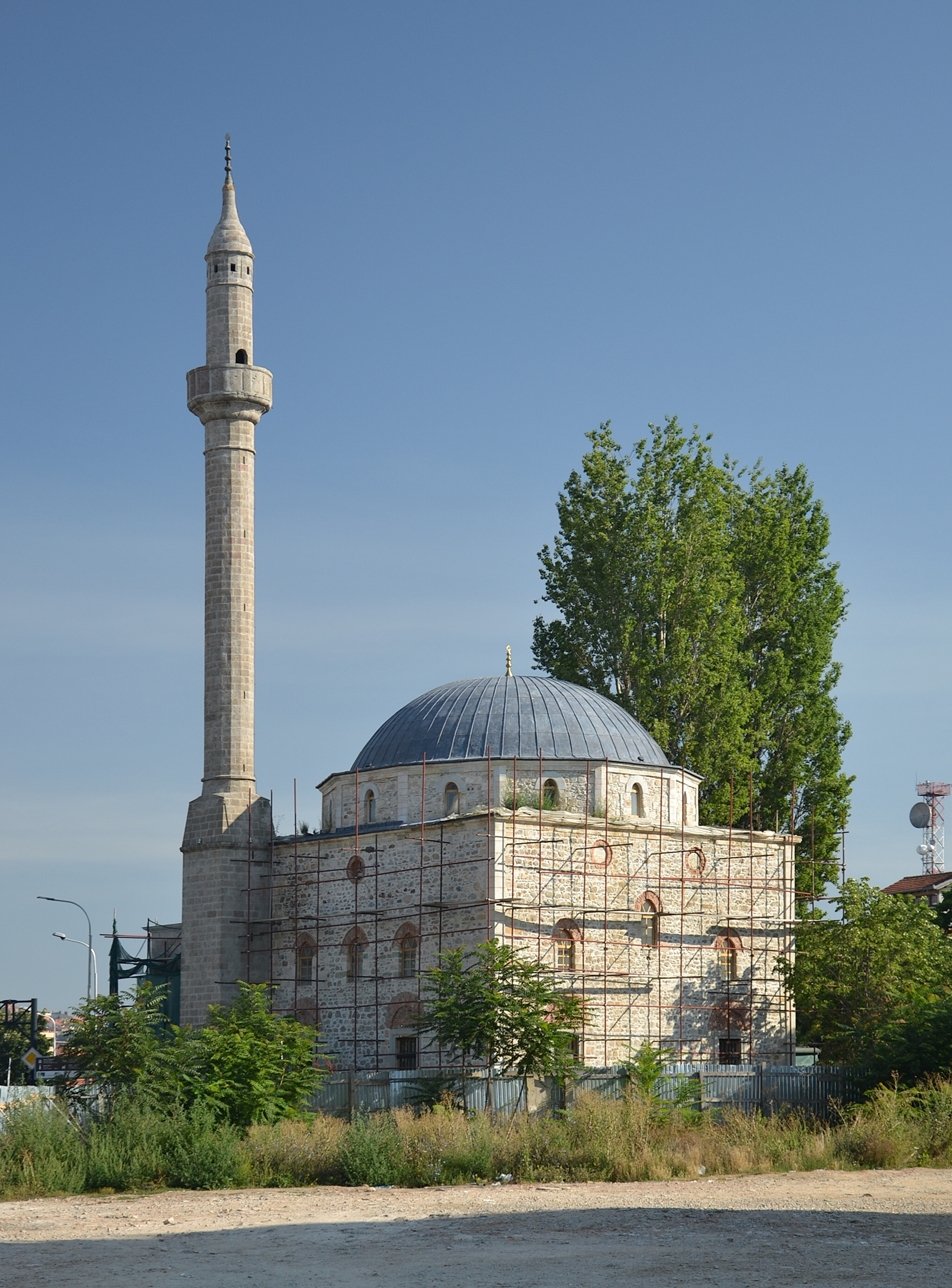
Çarshi Mosque

=== Islamic Monuments today ===
The Islamic community of Kosovo managed to repair some of the badly damaged mosques, and even built some new ones, using mainly community funds, voluntary donations by individuals, NGOs and governmental organizations such as the UAE contingent in the KFOR operation.

There are many mosques that have been built after the war. The contributions usually come from businessmen and wealthy people. Sometimes Kosovo Muslims, living in the west, do fundraising among their compatriots and bring the money back to the country. This is especially related to helping the poor donations and building mosques. Islamic Community of Kosovo usually organizes manages these fundraising, recently ICK has announced a project about building the Great Mosque in Pristina after getting the permission by relevant authorities.

Six Islamic monuments in Kosovo, among them Red Mosque in Peja, Hadum Mosque in Gjakova, Deçan Mosque, and Hammam of Ali Bey in Vushtrri, were selected to be restored by the UNESCO as well. UNESCO also sent two missions, in March 2003 and April 2004, to assess damage to Kosovo's cultural heritage in Kosovo. The findings of these missions resulted with a list of 48 Christian sites, 14 Islamic sites and 13 secular and historic buildings to present to the donors.

== Christianity ==
Christianity has been around in Pristina since its time under the Roman Empire. Before the Battle of Kosovo in 1389, Roman and Byzantine Empires Christianized the whole of the Balkan region. In today's time, most of the population of Pristina follows Islam. They have Muslim backgrounds and ancestry. but also including Slavic speakers (who mostly identify themselves as Gorani or Bosniaks) and Turks.

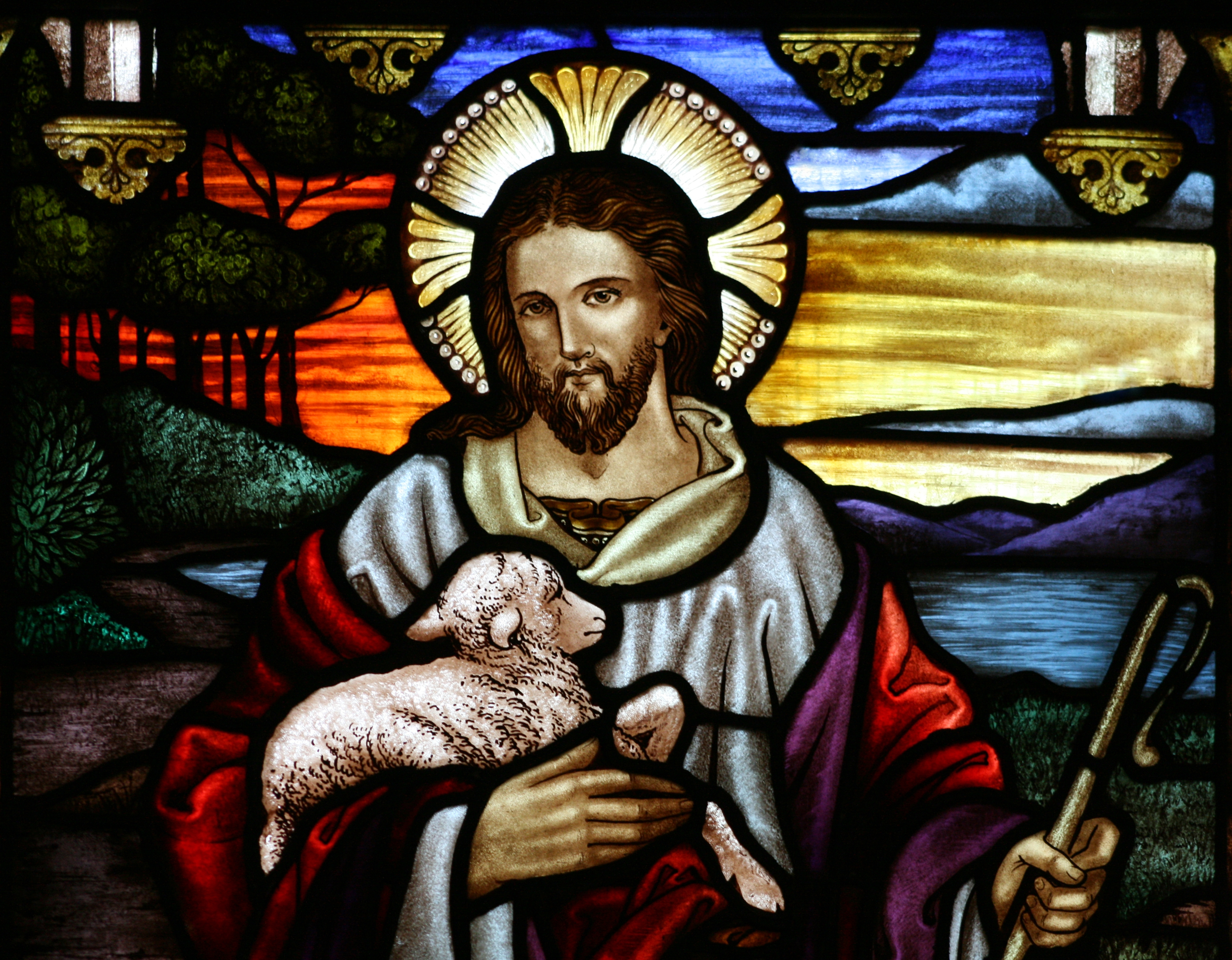
Stained glass Illustrates Jesus' description of himself "I am the Good Shepherd" (from the Gospel of John, chapter 10, verse 11). This version of the image shows a close up of the key features of the scene.

There are only approximately about three percent of people in Pristina of who are still Roman Catholic even through all the centuries of Ottoman rule. During the period when there were many changes made regarding religion, the second half of the 16th century to the end of the 18th century, many people kept and continued to accept Catholic rites in private. They banned this from the year 1703. (31) But still in 1845 a large percentage of Pristina's population who were Muslims continued to say they were Catholics so they would not have to enlist for state service, which was compulsory, and as late as 1845 significant numbers of people who had passed as Muslims declared themselves to be Catholics, to avoid conscription. Mother Teresa, whose parents were possibly from Kosovo, saw the vision which decided her upon her religious vocation at the Church of the Black Madonna at Letnica in Kosovo. The central boulevard in Pristina is named after her. The central boulevard in Pristina is named after her. A Catholic Cathedral was consecrated in Pristina in 2011, having been built on land donated by the municipality. There were widespread, though unconfirmed, rumours that President Ibrahim Rugova had been baptised a Catholic before his death in 2006.

Dating back, not a few years ago, in the late 1990s there was a dreadful rebellion by most of the Kosovars. Most of these Kosovars were Muslim came out with an open rebellion against the Serbian rule. The “ethnic cleansing” that the Yugoslav President, Slobodan Milosevic, enforced towards the population not just of Pristina but the whole of Kosovo, killed thousands and hundreds had to flee. Between March and June 1999, NATO intervened with a 78-day campaign focused at bombing and of which was done to tackle Serb forces and so Kosovo remains under UN control. The Pristina community has shown a great amount of frustration towards the amount of time that it had taken to decide Pristina's future status. Attacks against Kosovo's remaining minority Serb population have caused concern.

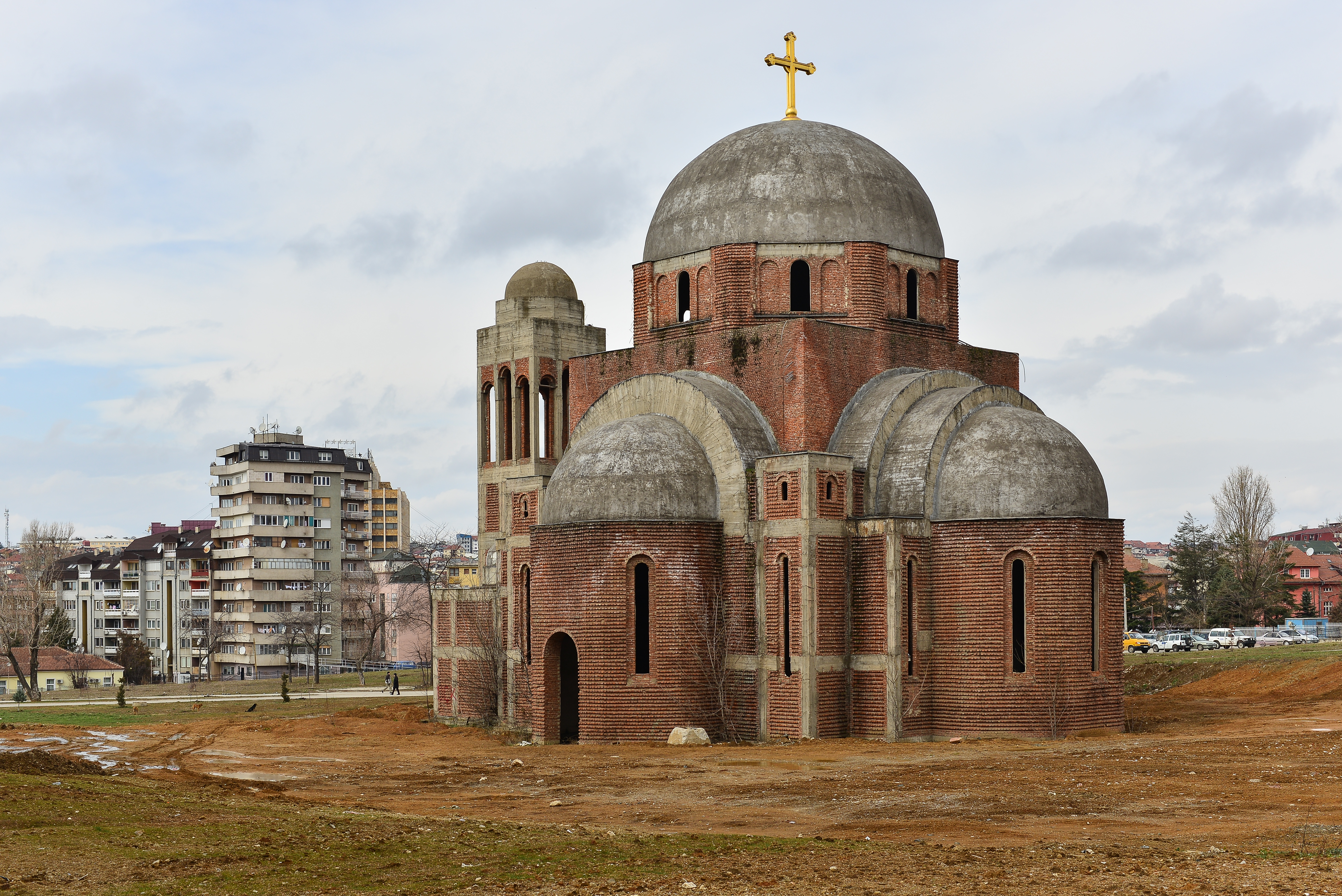
Serbian Orthodox Christian church

=== Serbian Orthodox Christianity in Pristina ===
Members of the Kosovo Serb community in Pristina have more rights than the average Kosovar in Pristina regarding religious, historical and cultural protection, especially within the Serbian Orthodox monasteries.“Special Protection Areas” (SPZ) are made around monuments, buildings and historical sites to protect historical, cultural, architectural or archaeological, natural environment or its aesthetic because these buildings or monuments hold a lot of importance to the Serbian community in Pristina. Therefore, if an area is declared or designated as a “Special Protection Area”, then it is protected so that no damage can come of the importance those places hold, including historical, cultural, architectural or archaeological, natural environment or its aesthetic areas. This process is monitored and guided by an Implementation and Monitoring Council (IMC). In case of dispute between the Serbian Orthodox Church and the central or local authorities of Kosovo, KIM can mediate between the two parties.

The Serbian population in Pristina is largely Serbian Orthodox. In general Kosovo has many monasteries and churches (26 monasteries, all Serb Orthodox). Dozens of churches were destroyed, and others damaged, after the end of Serbian governance in 1999, and a further 35 were damaged in the week of the violence in March 2004. There are also a small number of evangelical Protestants, whose tradition dates back to the Methodist missionaries' work centered in Bitola in the late 19th century. They are represented by the Kosovo Protestant Evangelical Church (KPEC).The Christ the Savior Cathedral in Pristina, Kosovo is an unfinished Serbian Orthodox Christian church whose construction began in 1995. Due to have been completed in 1999, its construction, on the campus of the pre-war University of Pristina, was interrupted by the Kosovo War.

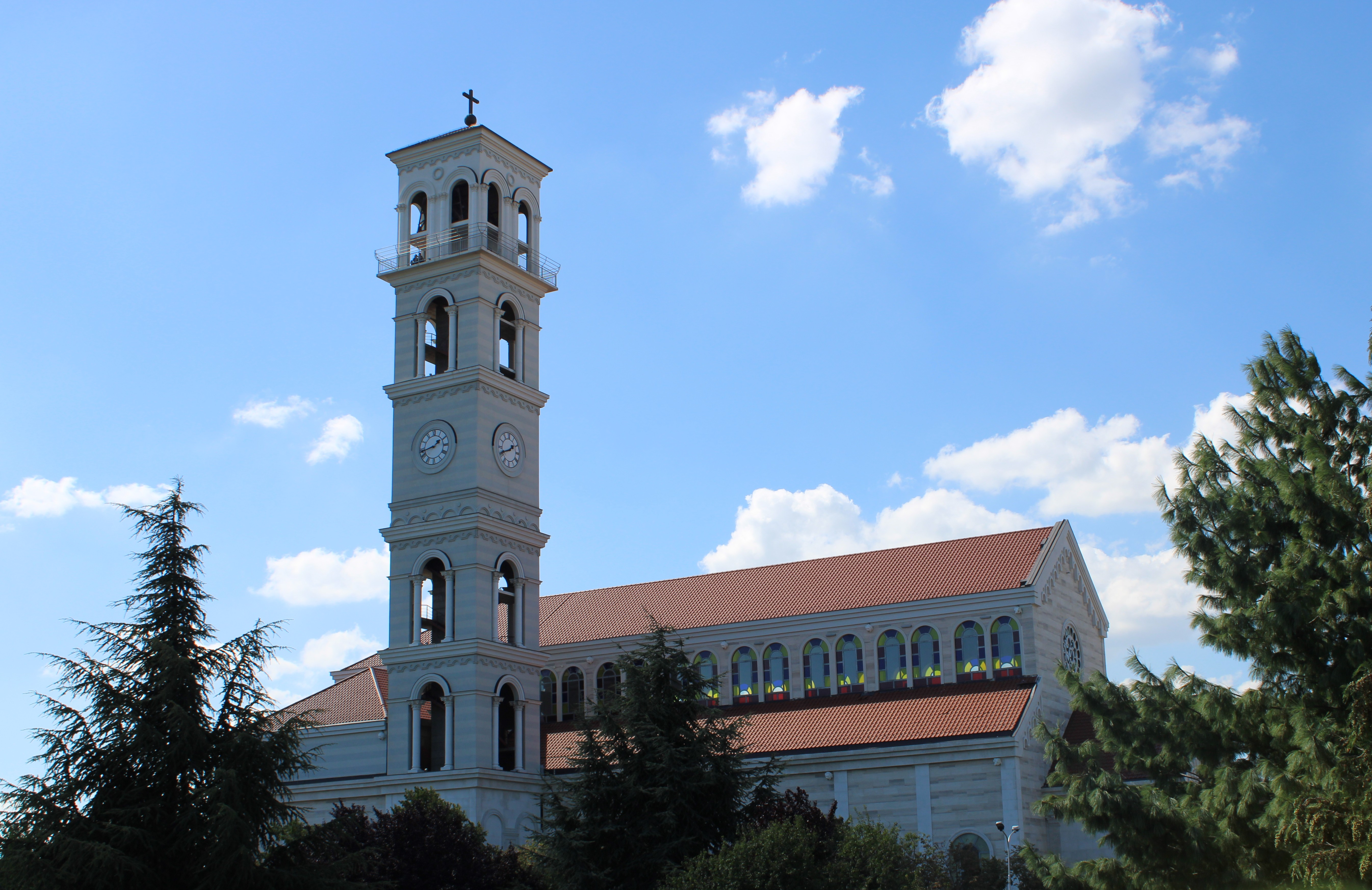
Cathedral of Saint Mother Teresa

=== Catholic Christianity in Pristina ===
The Cathedral of Saint Mother Teresa (Albanian: Katedralja e së Lumes Nënë Tereza në Prishtinë) is a cathedral located in Pristina. In 2007, the government approved plans for it to be built, and it is currently being constructed. The cathedral is dedicated to Blessed Mother Teresa. Himself a Muslim, the former president of Kosovo Ibrahim Rugova ceremonially laid the church's foundation.

Upon the cathedral's completion, the Apostolic Administration of Prizren that is covering Kosovo, will move from Prizren to Pristina. The cathedral will be one of Pristina's tallest buildings when it is complete.

=== Protestant Christianity in Pristina ===
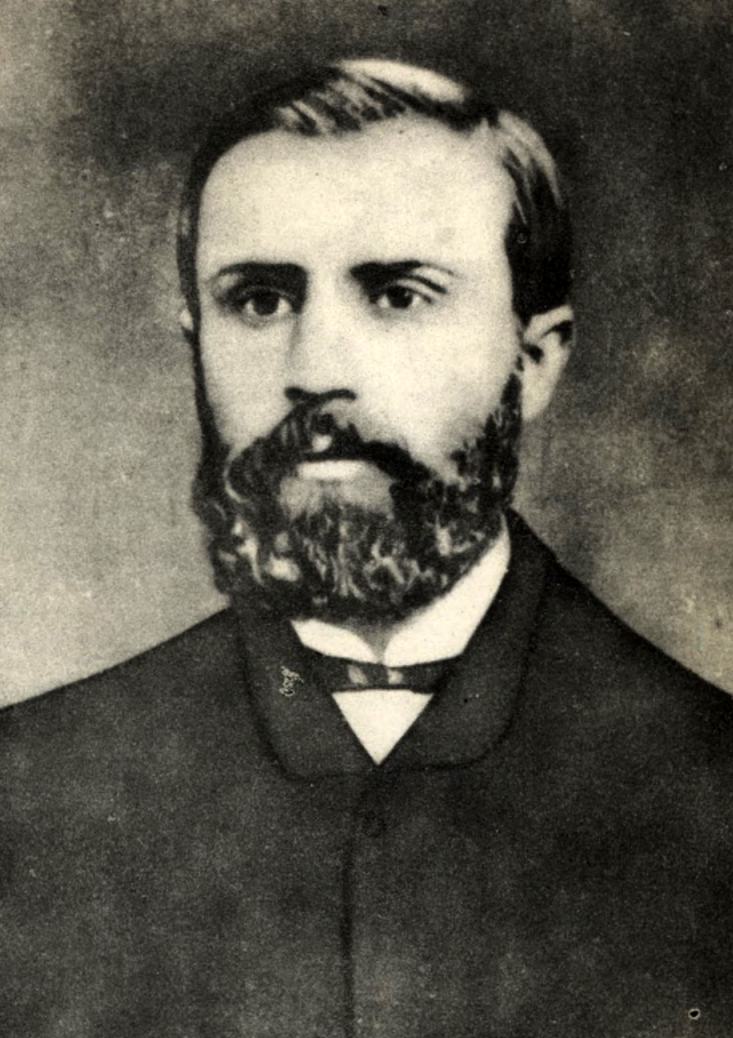
The founder, Gjerasim Qiriazi(writer & Protestant priest)

The Kosovo Protestant Evangelical Church (Albanian: Kisha Protestante Ungjillore e Kosovës) (KPEC) is a Protestant church based in Pristina, Kosovo. It is one of the four protected major religions in the Kosovo Law of Religious Freedoms. There are 6,000 Kosovar Albanians living in Pristina that follow this church. There are 42 churches in all of Kosovo. Its chairman Pastor is Artur Krasniqi. The oldest Protestant church found in Kosovo was in 1818, by Gjerasim Qiriazi. The first Albanians to convert to Protestantism were Nikolla and Dhimitër of Manastir, who did so in 1876. One year later, Gjerasim Qiriazi also converted.

By 1882, however, there were up to 36 believers added to the Albanian Evangelical Church family. In Manastir, the first Protestant Church was born and then in 1890, a second church was opened in Korça, they were led by Gjerasim Qiriazi, who at that time was a newly Christian. He was also the head of the first national society within Albania named “Evangelical Brotherhood”, due to this Gjerasim Qiriazi is now also known as the father of the Kosovo Protestant Evangelical Church.

Local Protestant churches carry different names, either by its functional or by its organizing structure make the formal religious community which is called The "Kosova Protestant Evangelical Church" (KPEC). KPEC has an ecclesiological structure in the organization of its decision-making and executive bodies. The KPEC church hierarchy is formed in that way so it is doctrinally biblical and practically functional. At the local level, Evangelicals respect the autonomy of local churches in self-governing its everyday church affairs. However, at the national level, KPEC bodies are: Assembly (Synod), Council of Ministers (Presbytery) and the chairman.

The KPEC Chairperson can only be a candidate and be elected for two consecutive mandates. The KPEC Chairperson represents the institution of the KPEC before KPEC members and before other state and international institutions. The chairperson together with the vice-chair prepares the agenda for CM meetings and together with the Treasurer prepares and manages the annual budget, which is brought before the Assembly for approval. The current KPEC President is Pastor Femi Cakolli.

== See also ==
- Religion in Kosovo
- Islam in Kosovo
- Christianity in Kosovo
- Kosovo Protestant Evangelical Church (KPEC)
- Serbian Orthodox Church in Kosovo
- Monument of Culture of Exceptional Importance
