= Artur Krasniqi =

Kosovar religious leader (born 1977)

- Born: Artur Krasniqi; 9 December 1977 (age 48); Peja, SFR Yugoslavia
- Other names: Arthur Krasniqi
- Known for: Leader of Kosovo Protestant Evangelical Church

Artur Krasniqi (born 9 December 1977 in Peja) is a Kosovar Albanian pastor who leads the Kosovo Protestant Evangelical Church and owns the church in Downtown Pristina. He has been in conflict with the Muslims in the area over burial rights.

== History ==
Artur Krasniqi’s father, Nikë Krasniqi, born and raised a Roman Catholic, returned from military service in Croatia. He converted to Protestantism in the army, and upon return to Kosovo started preaching the faith towards his family and friends. After many people heard about it, on 16 June 1985 the first Protestant-evangelical church in Kosovo was inaugurated.

== Personal life ==
Krasniqi was born in Peja. In 1977, he went to the high school Eqerem Çabej, then went to the Eqerem Çabej University for Theological studies. Then, he became a priest in the Kosovo Protestant Evangelical Church in Downtown Pristina. He is fluent in Albanian, English, and Serbo-Croatian.
