= Llapi Mosque =

Ottoman-era mosque in Pristina, Kosovo

Llapi Mosque Ramadan Mosque
- Xhamia e Llapit
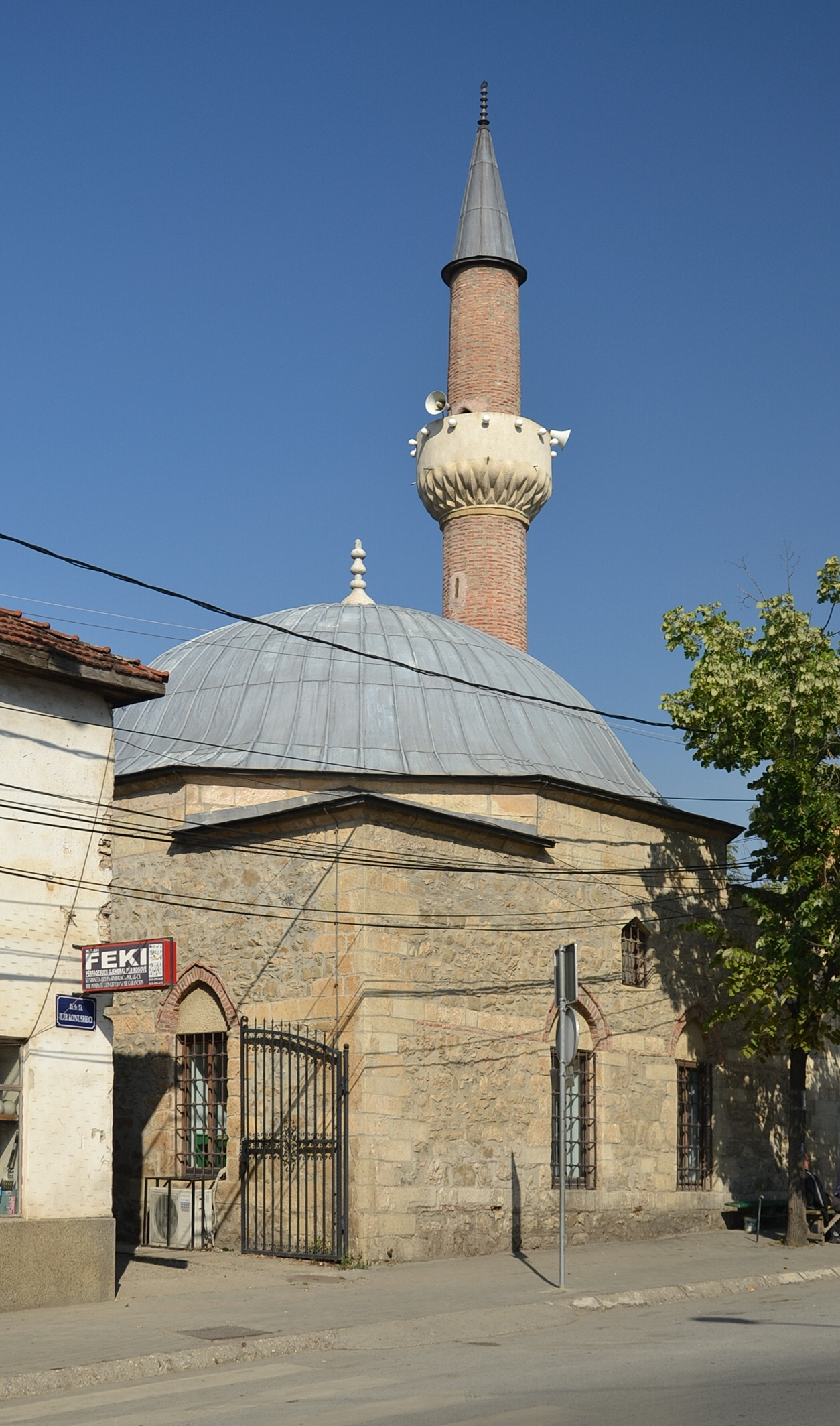
- Interactive map of the Llapi Mosque; Ramadan Mosque area

General information
- Status: Open
- Type: Mosque
- Location: Pristina, Kosovo
- Coordinates: 42°40′16″N 21°09′42″E
- Completed: 1470; 556 years ago
- Affiliation: Sunni Islam

Llapi Mosque (Albanian: Xhamia e Llapit) or Ramadan Mosque (Xhamia Ramadanie) is a mosque located in the northern part of the old city center (Old Bazaar) of Pristina, Kosovo.

== Formation ==
When construction of the minaret began the Catholics destroyed it twice overnight. Archaeological excavation has never been done and would probably shed light on the origin of the building. The mosque continuously functioned as a place of worship and prayer until 1999, when it was burned down and then abandoned.

The Llapi Mosque consists of the mosque itself with its minaret, a courtyard with surrounding walls to the north and west, the place of ablution (a fountain for ablution before prayer), which is located inside the surrounding wall. The base of the mosque has a dimension of 11.5 x 11 m. Its walls are 1.5 m thick and are built of carved sandstone and covered with mortar. The minaret was built in the same way. The room of the mosque is divided by the dome supported by an octagon. The transition from the base to the octagon is realized with pedantics. The interior of the mosque is notable for the pedestals starting at ground level to support the octagonal dome above the square room, which made this mosque very special. The interior is decorated with colorful murals, dominated by floral motifs. These drawings are highly regarded by Islamic art specialists as rare and unique works of the 16th century.

== History ==
It is believed that it was built by Ramadan Pasha, and after him it is named the Ramadanie Mosque of Llap. Historically, it is also known as the Ramadan Mosque and belongs to the Ottoman Period. Most of the documentary evidence testifies that the Llapi Mosque was built in 1470, however, in 1996 a marble plate was found in the courtyard which leads to another date of construction (Hijri 959, respectively 1551). According to an anonymous traveler, it is said that the mosque was started as a church.

The mosque was renovated during the 1980s. During the 1999 war it was burned. Although not completely destroyed, the wooden doors, windows and interior details were burned. The entire interior surface is covered with soot and mud and the floor is covered with debris. Since 1999 the mosque has been left to fate, without doors or windows. During the renovation in 1980, the minaret was repaired with red brick. Later the facade by the side of the street, the western wall of the mosque is covered with white silicate bricks. The entrance to the mosque, which was originally on the courtyard side, is covered with a roof to serve as the entrance to the neighboring commercial space. The yard has generally lost its original aspect and has been used as a parking lot. The mihrab, the pulpit and the mahvili inside the mosque were completely destroyed by fire. The mihrab was decorated with colorful geometric ornaments. The pulpit was built of stone and at a later stage was covered with plywood. Mahvili was built of wood.

In 2009 the conservation / restoration of the mosque was done. The entire interior is cleaned of debris and soot. The wooden interior elements, doors and windows have been rebuilt according to the original model. The floor has been rebuilt. The murals have been restored and preserved by specialists in the field, using contemporary materials and best practices. While out, the covering silicate bricks and annex have been removed and the damaged mortar has been repaired with traditional lime coating. The layer of iron under the cover has been replaced with the layer of traditional glaze. The mosque is now open to the religious community.

== See also ==
- Architecture of Kosovo
- Islam in Kosovo
- Religion in Kosovo
