= Kosovo Protestant Evangelical Church =

Protestant church based in Kosovo

- Kisha Protestante Ungjillore e Kosovës
- Abbreviation: KPEC
- Type: Eastern Protestant
- Primate: Artur Krasniqi
- Region: Kosovo
- Language: Albanian
- Headquarters: Pristina
- Territory: Kosovo; Albania
- Possessions: 42 buildings in Kosovo
- Founder: Gjerasim Qiriazi
- Independence: 16 June 1985
- Recognition: Recognized by Kosovo government
- Members: 15,000
- Official website: https://kishaprotestante.com/

The Kosovo Protestant Evangelical Church (KPEC; Albanian: Kisha Protestante Ungjillore e Kosovës) is a Protestant church network based in Pristina, Kosovo. It is one of the four protected major religions in the Kosovo Law of Religious Freedoms. Between 10,000 and 15,000 Kosovar Albanians follow this church, 6,000 in Pristina alone. There are a large number of churches in all of Kosovo.

Government authorities see Evangelical Church as encompassing all Protestants. Figures in 2020 suggested that 0.61% of the country's populations was Protestant (just over 12,000 people).

== History and development ==
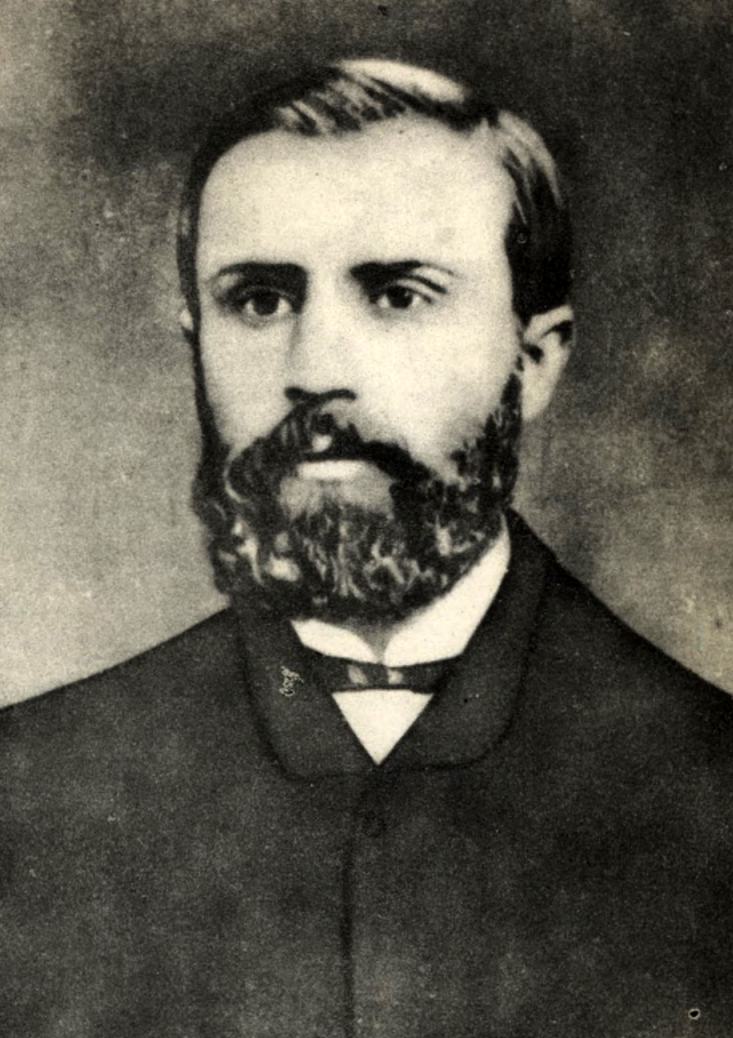
The founder, Gjerasim Qiriazi

The Kosovo Protestant church (and the Albanian Protestant Church) was founded by Gjerasim Qiriaz, but there were Protestant efforts previously. The British and Foreign Bible Society was a Protestant-based institution targeting the Ottoman Empire. There was a minor Protestant reformation in the Balkans after the Cyrniea war in 1856 after the Ottoman Turks had to give up. Albania was the sole country in the entire Ottoman Empire to take in the reform beliefs. The first Albanian to convert to Protestantism was Kostandin Kristoforidhi, who did so in 1856. He is buried in the Church St. Mary's of Kala, Elbasan burial grounds. Gjerasim Qiriazi also converted and became the first Albanian ordained Protestant minister.

By 1882, the Albanian Evangelical Church family grew up to 36 believers. The first Protestant church was founded in Manastir. In that year, prayers and sermons were conducted in the Albanian language. In 1890, a second church was opened in Korça, led by the newly Christian Gjerasim Qiriazi. Qiriazi was also the head of the first national society within Albania named "Evangelical Brotherhood". As a result, Gjerasim Qiriazi is considered the father of the Kosovo Protestant Evangelical Church.

The church was officially inaugurated on June 16, 1985, by the leadership of Artur Krasniqi. There is a church in downtown Pristina that was built after the church was inaugurated in 1985. Since 1999, after the Kosovo War, more Kosovo Albanians have been converting to the church. Currently, about 15,000 Kosovar Albanians follow this church, most of them having converted. Of these, 2,000 regularly attend church. There is about 6,000 followers in Pristina alone.

== Organization ==
Local Protestant churches carry different names, either by its functional or its organizing structure make the formal religious community which is called The "Kosova Protestant Evangelical Church" (KPEC). KPEC has an ecclesiological structure in the organization of its decision-making and executive bodies. The KPEC church hierarchy is formed in that way so it is doctrinally biblical and practically functional. At the local level, Evangelicals respect the autonomy of local churches in self-governing their everyday church affairs. However, at the national level, KPEC bodies are: Assembly (Synod), Leadership Council (Presbytery) and the President.

=== General Assembly ===
The KPEC General Assembly is the highest decision-making body in KPEC. It gathers once a year and is represented by representatives of all KPEC members. Each Evangelical entity – respectively local churches and organisations of Kosovo – that are KPEC members, are represented by the Legal Representative and in his/her absence by the Authorised Person. A KPEC member can be represented in the KPEC General Assembly by only one vote.

The KPEC General Assembly gathers once a year in its Annual Regular General Assembly or more often in Irregular Assemblies. During the plenary sessions, which are chaired by the KPEC Assembly Chair, amongst other things, the Assembly brings decisions for the interest of the KPEC, such as acceptance and/or dismissing of KPEC members; possible statutory amendments; approval of annual expenses and budget etc. The Assembly also elects with secret ballot the KPEC Leadership Council (LC) and the President. LC and the President are elected by a two-third majority.

=== Leadership Council ===
The Leadership Council (LC) is KPEC’s executive body and comes from the assembly. The LC has nine members and they can be members only if they are serving in a position of a spiritual leader in a local church. The assembly elects the LC for a three-year term, but every year two members are added and two removed.

Assembly itself maintains the election of LC members. Based on merits of the works of the individuals, participants in the assembly nominate potential candidates who may serve in such post. Upon completion, a list of nine persons is brought for secret ballot. LC members can only be candidates and can be elected for only two consecutive mandates. The LC regularly meets once a month and more often if required.

=== President ===
After the LC members have been elected, the KPEC members nominates the potential candidates for KPEC President (KPEC President is also the chairperson of the LC). After presenting candidatures, based on merits and the best program presented, Assembly administers an election of the President. The ballot is direct and secret. A two-thirds majority is required for election of the President for the next three-year mandate.

The KPEC president can be a candidate and be elected only for two consecutive mandates. The KPEC president represents the institution of the KPEC before KPEC members and before other state and international institutions. The president, in conjunction with the general secretary prepares the agenda for LC meetings and together with the treasurer prepares and manages the annual budget, which is brought before the assembly for approval. The current KPEC president is Pastor Artur Krasniqi.

== Relations ==
=== Conflicts ===
In what the Protestants say is an example of intimidation, the Islamic community in Gjakova decided to post a list of Protestant missionaries and leaders, together with their addresses, on a website. The information was taken down after complaints to authorities. The Protestants face legal obstacles when they seek to build churches and, in some cases, do not even have the right to bury their dead. Instead, they must ask Islamic imams to perform the burial and pay a fee to the Islamic Community for this service. The community has challenged what it says are onerous restrictions and is presenting its case before the Supreme Court. A particular concern, Krasniqi says, is the current law on religious freedom. Similarly, the KPEC plans to challenge the education ministry’s financing of an Islamic madrasa in the capital. They are calling for clear separation of religion and state, saying that the government should not be in the business of funding religious communities. The Protestants fear such plans are part of a growing Islamisation of Kosovo sponsored from outside. "We are alarmed that there are now an excess of mosques in proportion to the amount of Muslims that actually attend them, and these mosques are found in central, visible places," the report notes. "These mosques have been built by Islamic groups that are in Kosova as humanitarian organisations and this causes us concern." Local Muslims have already complained that damaged mosques were restored under Arab direction in Saudi undecorated style, in contrast to the decorated style traditional in Kosovo.

The latest draft of Kosovo's religion law favoured the five major groups in Kosovo: the Catholics, Muslims, and Serbian Orthodox, and the Kosovar Protestants. Artur Krasniqi stated that Protestants 'do not agree in any way with any discrimination whatsoever towards any religious group'. He was also concerned by the majority Muslim community's attitude to minorities. Chief Imam of Kosovo Sabri Bajgora stated recently that "Muslims will not be responsible for any consequences whatsoever to Protestants if they do not stop their activity in this country."

=== Regional relations ===
On June 12, 2012, the liberation day of Kosovo, the government of Kosovo dedicated a monument to dozens of internationals and organizations that have contributed to the peace and prosperity of the nation. The Kosovo Government also thanked Protestant Evangelical believers for all their help given to the Kosova population between 1999 and 2012. The motto behind this event was the Albanian old saying: “The good friend is shown in difficult days”.

The KPEC President, Secretary and the office staff were present for the dedication of the historic monument, and on behalf of the Kosova Protestant Evangelical Church, KPEC Secretary Brian Gibson had accepted the certificate of gratitude issued by the office of the Prime Minister. In the absence of the Prime Minister Hashim Thaçi, the Minister of Culture Memli Krasniqi awarded certificates.

=== International relations ===
On April 24, 2009, the World Evangelical Alliance met and accepted the Kosovo Protestant Evangelical Church as a member. The church is also a member of the more regional European Evangelical Alliance. Before the Kosovo War in 1998, the KPEC launched the International Day of Prayer, which also involved fasting, which influenced the rest of the World Evangelical Alliance. On January 31, all the evangelical countries join in prayer for Kosovo and how it suffered through the war. A message is also sent to the politicians in Kosovo to help pray for Kosovo. Ever since 1999 and the breakup of the Kosovo War, the World Evangelical Alliance joins in prayer on every January 31 for Kosovo.

== See also ==
- Religion in Kosovo
- Religion in Pristina
- Christianity in Kosovo
- Catholic Church in Kosovo
- Serbian Orthodox Church in Kosovo
