= Jashar Pasha Mosque =

Ottoman-era mosque in Pristina, Kosovo

Coordinates: 42.6660°N 21.1664°E

- Albanian: Xhamia e Jashar Pashës
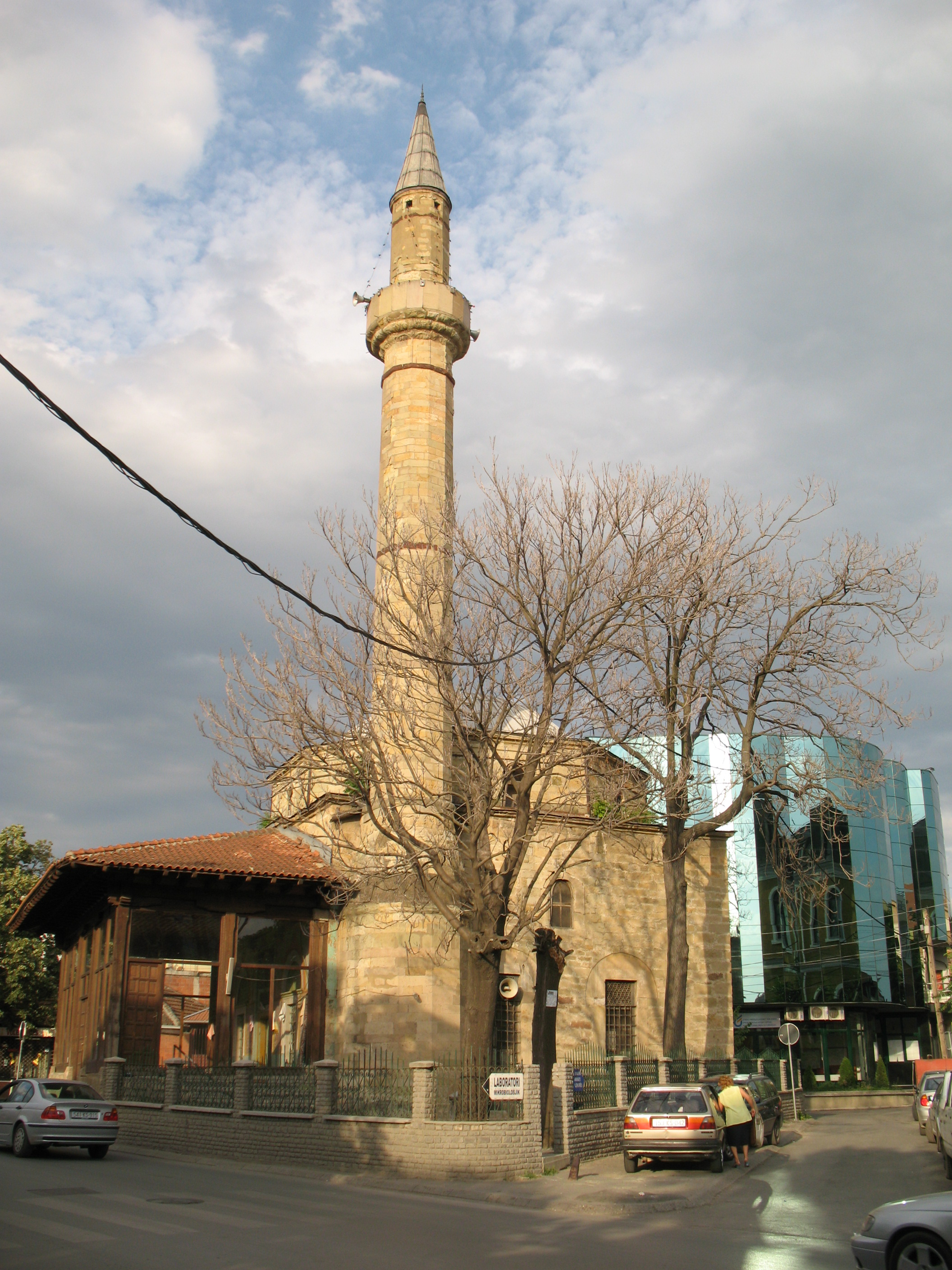

Religion
- Affiliation: Sunni Islam
- Sect: Sunni
- Year consecrated: 1834; 192 years ago

Location
- Location: Pristina
- Country: Kosovo
- Interactive map of Jashar Pasha Mosque

Architecture
- Type: Mosque
- Style: Ottoman
- Cultural Heritage under Permanent Protection
- Official name: Xhamia e Jashar Pashës
- Type: Architectural Heritage: Monument/Ensemble
- Reference no.: 2782

The Jashar Pasha Mosque is a historical mosque in Pristina, Kosovo. The mosque was built in 1834 by the mayor of Skopje, Mehmet Yasar.

== See also ==
- Architecture of Kosovo
- Historical monuments in Pristina
- Islam in Kosovo
- Religion in Pristina
