= Architecture of Kosovo =

The architecture of Kosovo dates back to the Neolithic period and includes the Copper, Bronze and Iron Ages, Antiquity and the Medieval period. It has been influenced by the presence of different civilizations and religions as evidenced by the structures which have survived to this day. Local builders have combined building techniques of conquering empires with the materials at hand and the existing conditions to develop their own varieties of dwellings.

The monasteries and churches from the 14th century represent the Serbian Orthodox legacy. Architectural heritage from the Ottoman period includes mosques and hamams from the 15th, 16th and 17th centuries. Other historical architectural structures of interest include kullas from the 18th and 19th centuries as well as a number of bridges, urban centers and fortresses. While some vernacular buildings are not considered important in their own right, taken together they are of considerable interest. During the 1999 conflict in Kosovo many buildings that represent this heritage were destroyed or damaged. In the Dukagjini region, at least 500 kullas were attacked, and most of them destroyed or otherwise damaged.

During the 1990s and thereafter, thousands of illegal buildings have been built in Kosovo. Rexhep Luci, the urban planner of Pristina who started an initiative to face this problem was killed in September 2000.

== Antiquity ==
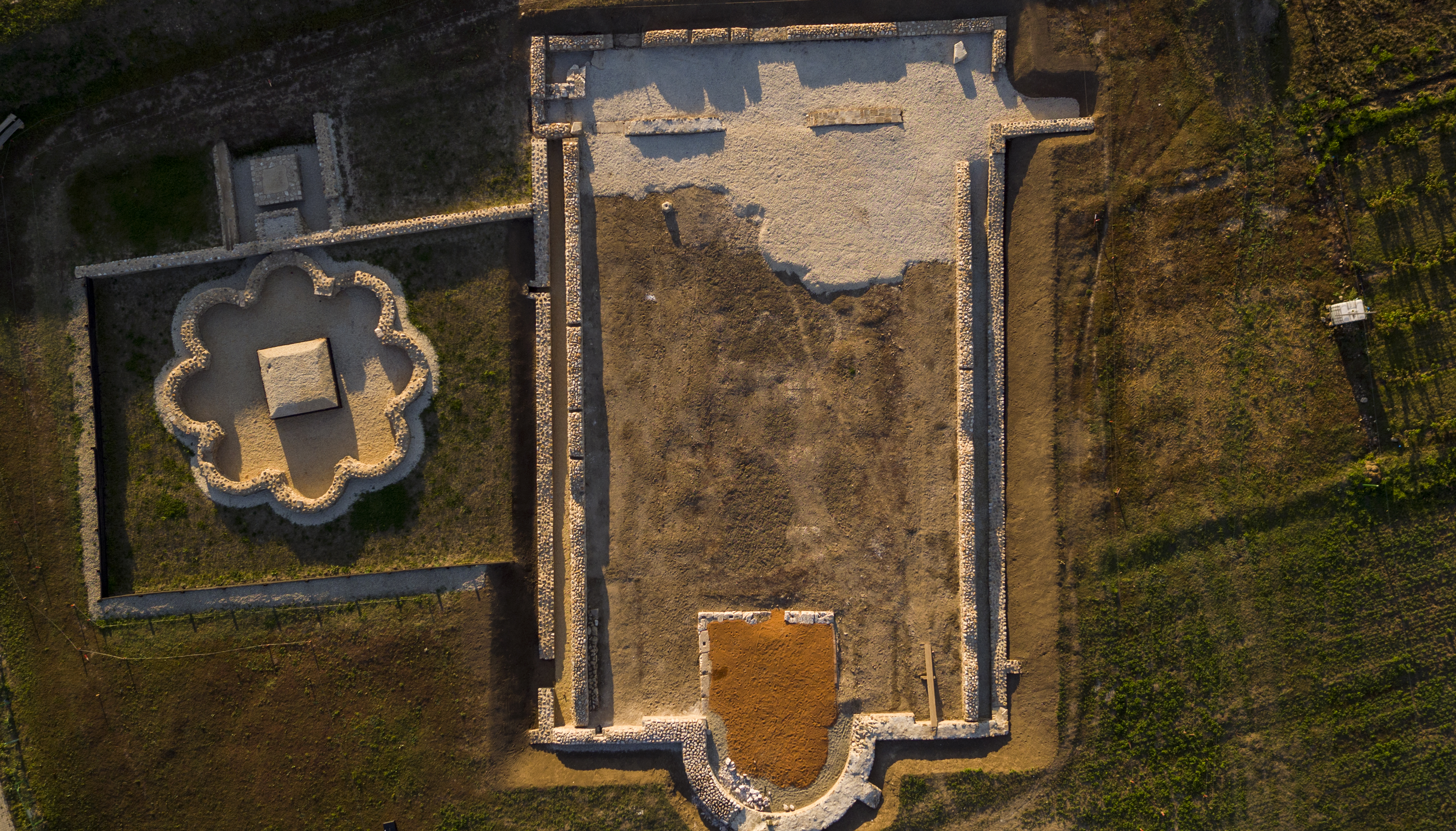
The basilica at Ulpiana

Ancient Ulpiana was a settlement of religious and cultural importance in the Roman Empire, that was active from the 1st to 7th centuries. Destroyed in an earthquake in 518, the settlement was later rebuilt by the emperor Justinian I. The city had a sustainable urban scheme typical of a Roman city in terms of street layout and water supply. It also had 3-meter-thick city walls with watch towers and 5-meter-wide castle gates. Apart from Ulpiana, another notable city from the Roman period is the Municipium Dardanorum. Among the remaining sites from this city are the forum, the basilica, the temple and other buildings.

According to geo-physical research conducted by an Albanian archaeologist and foreigners, more than 100 ha worth of objects lie in Ulpiana. On the north side of the city is the cemetery, where many objects have been found: the foundations of a basilica (Paleolithic-Christian) of early Christianity built in the beginning of the 4th century by Emperor Justinian. Also found is the north entry of the city with its walls and a memorium, a room or a form of funeral. The ruins of a building with a beautiful mosaic are found in the south of the city. The research mainly focused on antique objects which have been found on the sides of the main road which connected the antique city with the rest of the region. Attention was given to the findings of the objects in the north entrance of the city. With the addition of the use of air photography and satellites in the past years archaeologists, with no costly digging, were able to find and describe lots of big antique buildings which included a public bathroom, the forum (administrative center of the city), a residency of the bishop in the era of the early Christianity, and a baptismal chapel.

A monument dedicated to the Dardanian Empress is a site with notable architectural features from this era.

== Middle Ages ==
Buildings from the Late Antiquity and Early Middle Ages, when Kosovo was under the reign of the Byzantine Empire include castles in Prizren, Veletin and Kasterc and Christian basilicas in Ulpiana, Vërmicë and Harilaq. These and other building signify cultural and spiritual developments in this area. In the Middle Ages, there was a simultaneous presence of Byzantine, Catholic and Orthodox Monuments.

=== Byzantine period ===
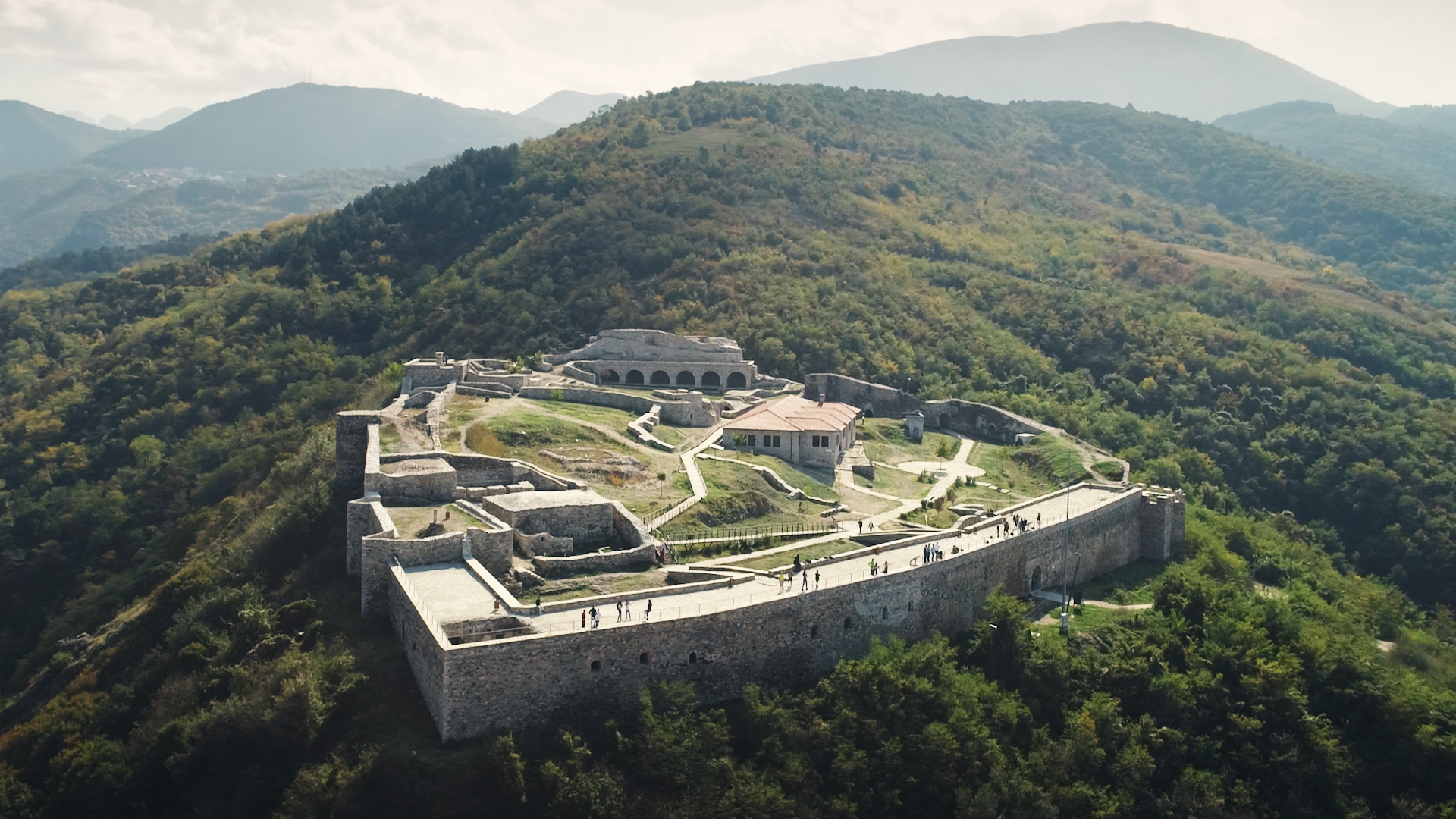
Prizren Fortress

The Fortress of Prizren is located in the city of Prizren. The first mention of it is from the 6th century AD and the last time it was used for non-recreational purposes was in 1912. The fortress has seen a number of civilizations and constructions in the castle have happened in different historical periods. The remains of the fortress are of point of interest from an architectural point of view. Although it is an important historical monument, archaeological excavations haven't been completed.

=== Serbian period ===
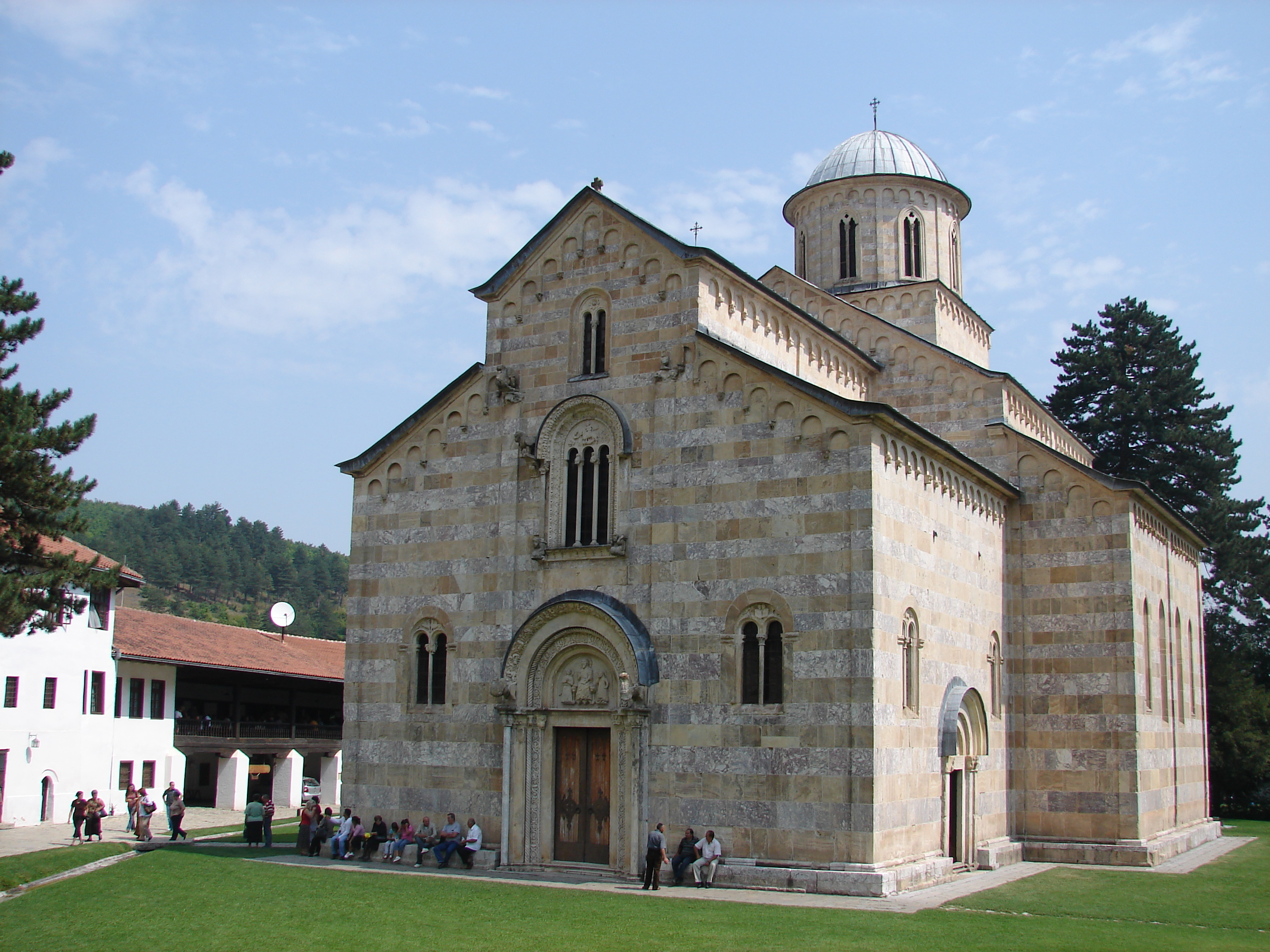
Visoki Dečani

The church of the monastery in Deçan was built by a Franciscan Friar from Kotor called Vita (Vitus). The building is of the Romanesque and Gothic architectural styles. The style it was built in is influenced by Western tradition while the main dome of the church links it with Byzantine traditions. The external part of the church contains details made of marble of different colors decorated with sculpture, while the interior part contains Byzantine frescoes. Most of the original marble furniture is still in the church which is uncommon for churches of this period from the Balkans. The church was founded by the Serbian king Stefan Dečanski (1321–31) and it was constructed as his mausoleum.

=== Ottoman period ===
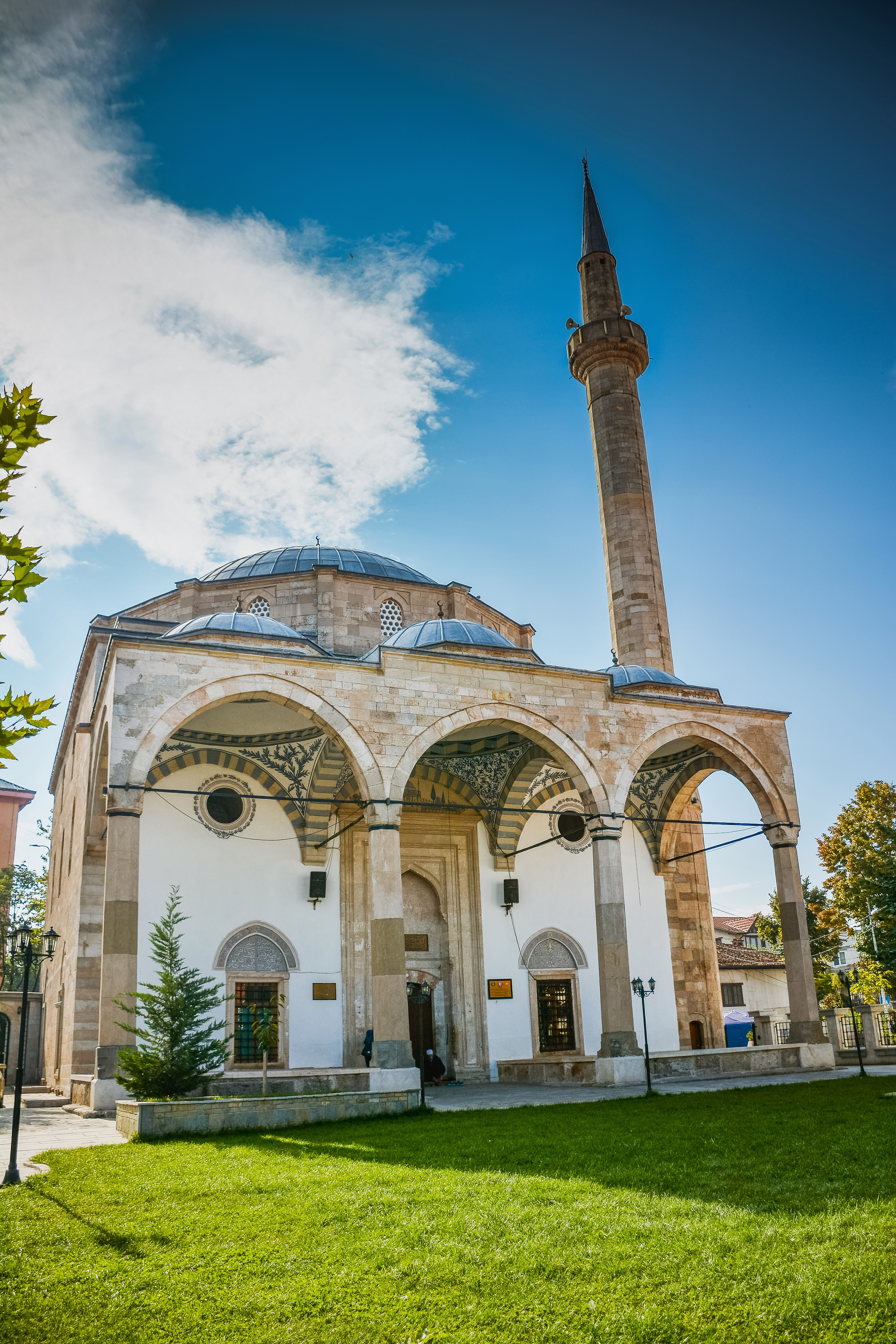
The Imperial Mosque in Pristina

The Imperial Mosque, also known as King's Mosque (Albanian: Xhamia e Mbretit), is a mosque built in 1461 by Sultan Mehmed II. Based on the monument, structure, construction way and decorative elements it ranks among the most important buildings of Islamic architecture in Eastern Europe.

Jashar Pasha Mosque is a 16th-century mosque located in the historical center of Pristina and it is one of the oldest buildings in Pristina. The mosque has a prayer hall, a porch and a minaret and it is covered with a cupola. It is an architectural monument of Kosovan style with oriental influences.

== Yugoslav period ==
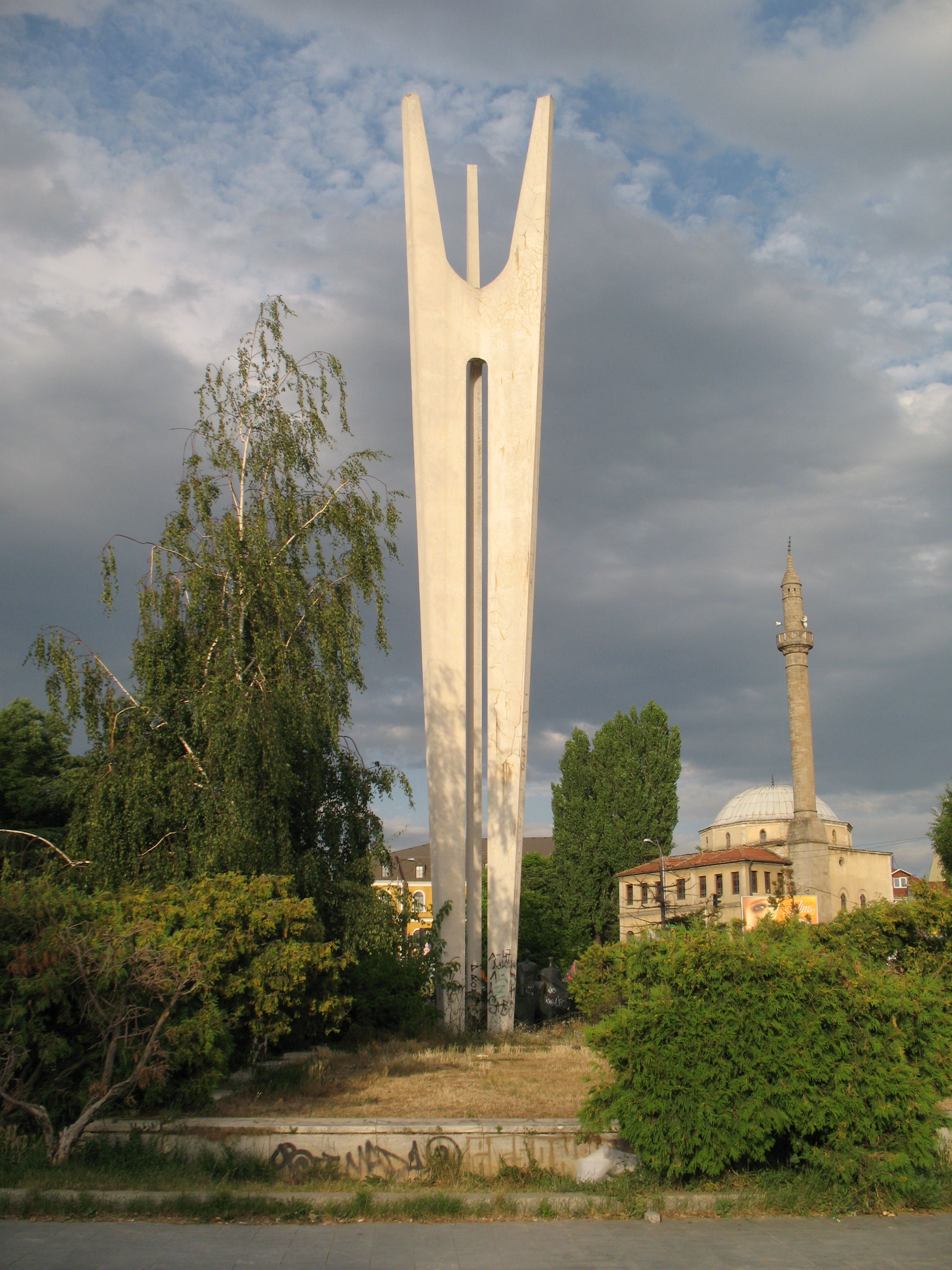
The Monument of Brotherhood and Unity in Pristina's centre

In 1950, at the outset of Socialist Yugoslavia, the motto of the State as far as city planning was concerned was "Destroy the old, build the new". A 1959 book by the Municipal National Council of Pristina called "Prishtina" shows the intentions of the regime at the time to lose the city's previous characteristics in the quest to give it more modern traits. The book boasts about 2200 newly built apartments, a number of health facilities, administrative buildings and schools, 130.000 square meters of new roads and pavements. According to this book, the new look of Pristina was to be built on the ruins of the old city. New memorials were being erected and special care was being given to set new aesthetic foundations on the city.

Immediately following the Second World War, Yugoslavia's brief association with the Eastern Bloc ushered in a short period of socialist realism. Centralization within the communist model led to the abolition of private architectural practices and the state control of the profession. During this period, the governing Communist Party condemned modernism as "bourgeois formalism," a move that caused friction among the nation's pre-war modernist architectural elite.

Socialist realist architecture in Yugoslavia came to an abrupt end with Josip Broz Tito's 1948 split with Stalin. In the following years the nation turned increasingly to the West, returning to the modernism that had characterized pre-war Yugoslav architecture. During this era, modernist architecture came to symbolize the nation's break from the USSR (a notion that later diminished with growing acceptability of modernism in the Eastern Bloc).

The Yugoslav break from Soviet socialist realism combined with efforts to commemorate World War II, which together led to the creation of an immense quantity of abstract sculptural war memorials, known today as spomenik including the Monument of Brotherhood and Unity in Pristina's centre.

In the late 1950s and early 1960s Brutalism began to garner a following within Yugoslavia, particularly among younger architects, a trend possibly influenced by the 1959 disbandment of the Congrès Internationaux d'Architecture Moderne.

With 1950s decentralization and liberalization policies in SFR Yugoslavia, architecture became increasingly fractured along ethnic lines. Architects increasingly focused on building with reference to the architectural heritage of their individual socialist republics in the form of critical regionalism.

The Hotel Union building is located in the center of Pristina. It is a three-storey, L-shaped building of Austro-Hungarian architectural style with a surface of 500 square meters on the ground. It was designed by an Austrian architect and built in 1927 when it was used as a hotel. Because it is a distinguished example of that particular architectural style in Kosovo it was declared a protected cultural monument 1996. On August 22, 2009, the building caught on fire and sustained major damages. The building and the surrounding area went through a restoration Arassociati studio that made it functional again. Now it is operated by The United Colors of Benetton and is called Benetton Megastore in Pristina. The store was opened on September 9, 2013. The roof has remained its original form while the entrance has been given a new urban layout.

The Palace of Youth and Sport, commonly called Boro-Ramizi, was built in 1977 with a surface of 8,136 square metres (87,580 sq ft) and was intended to be used for social, public, cultural and sport activities. The building caught fire in February 2000 due to an electrical malfunction. Now only the shopping center part of the building is functional.

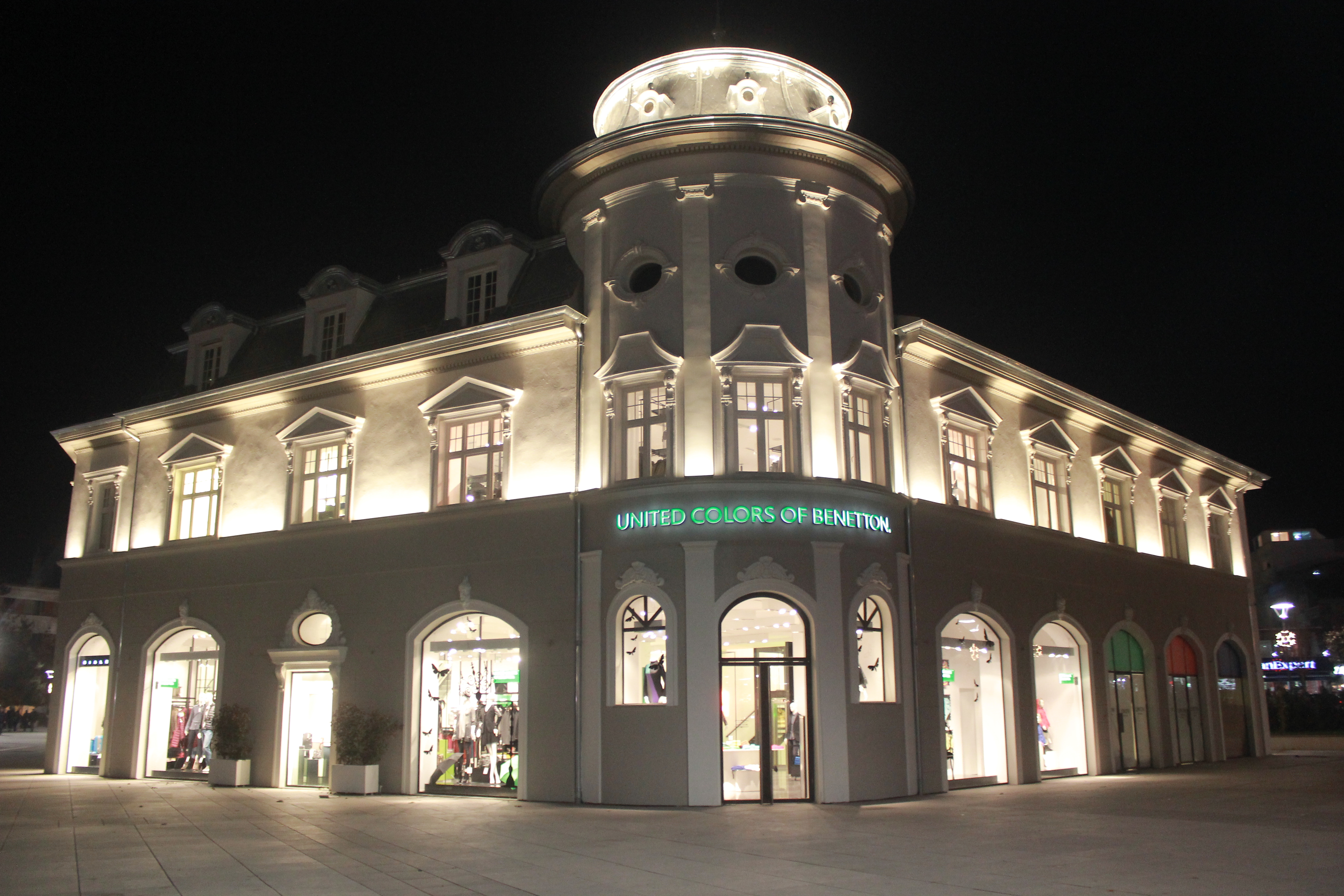
The Hotel Union Building after restoration

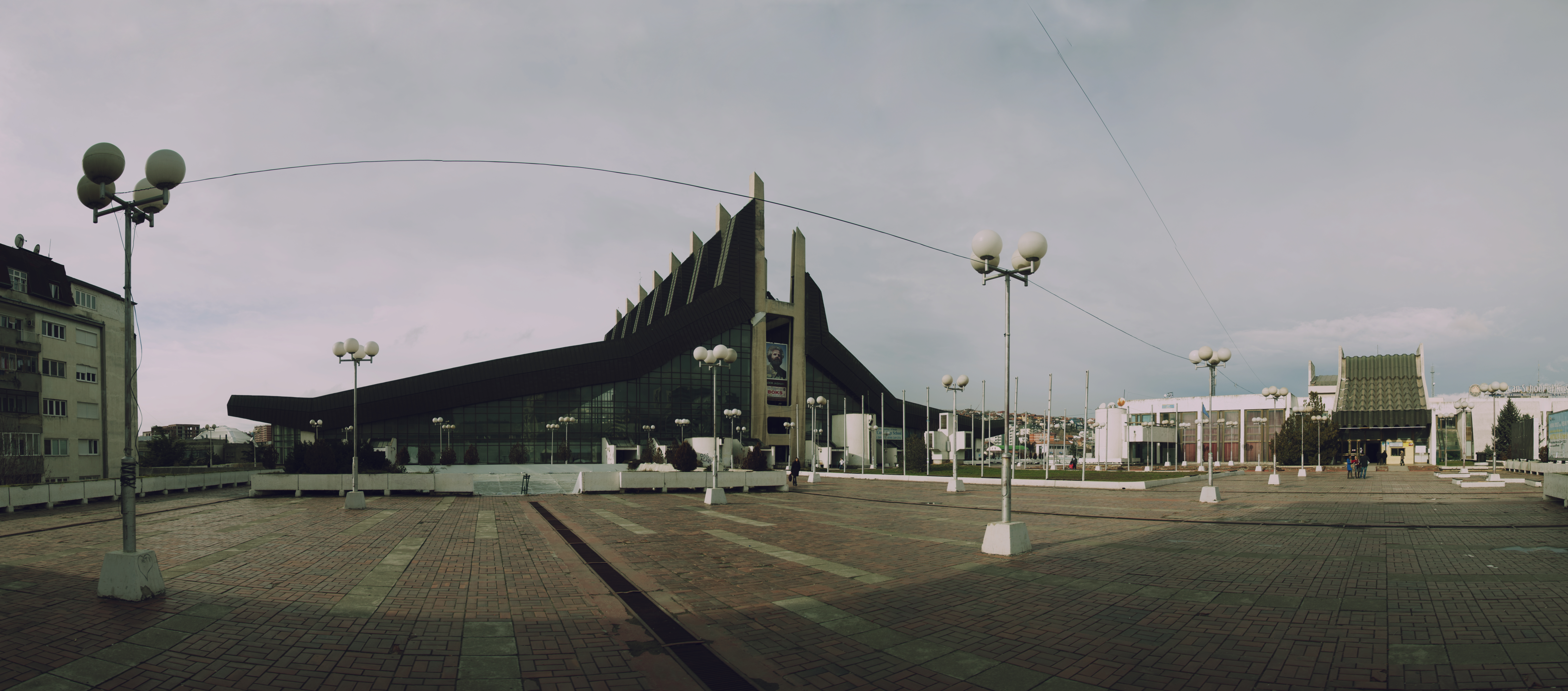
Palace of Youth and Sport (Boro-Ramizi)

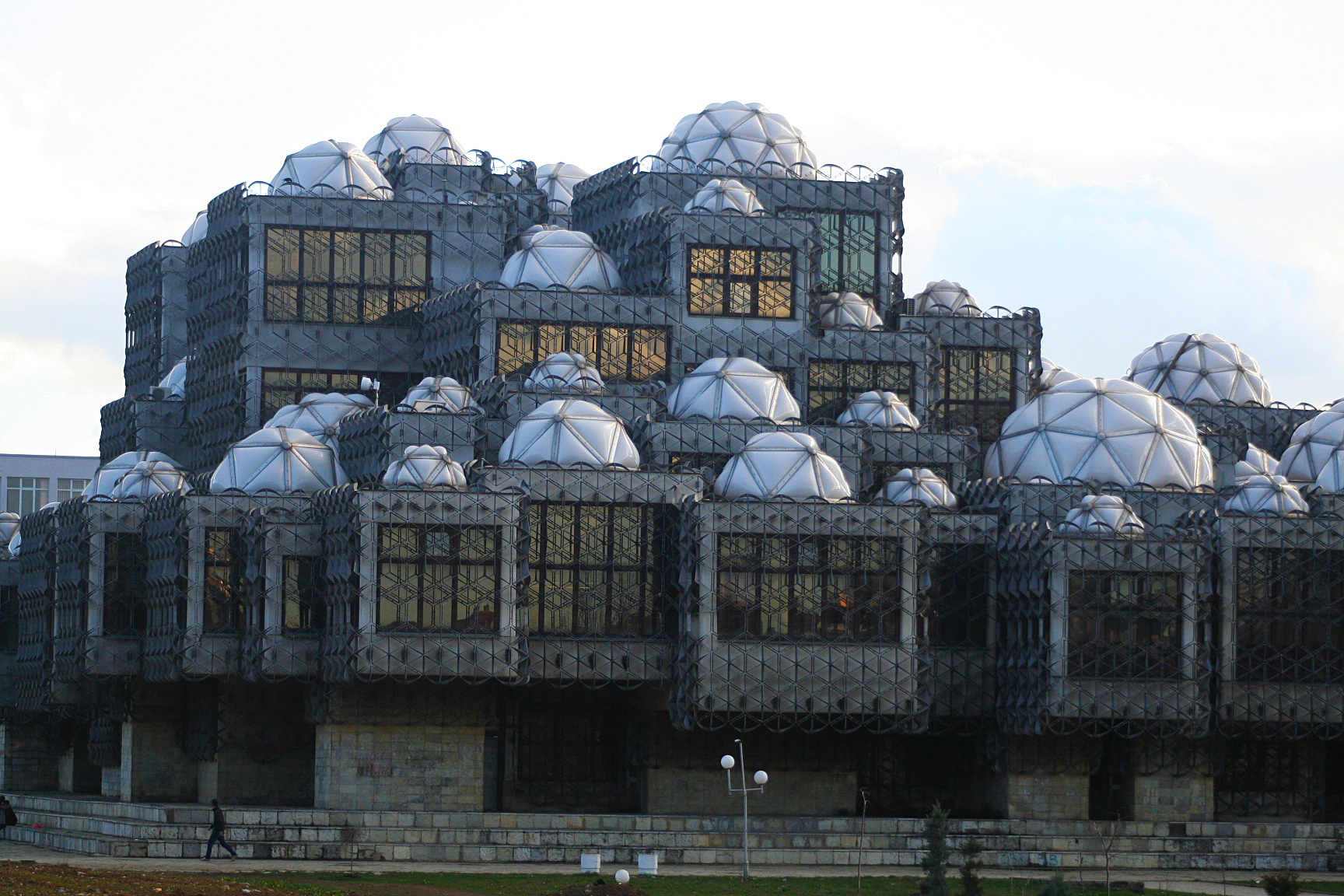
The domes of Andrija Mutnjaković's National Library of Kosovo (1982) in Pristina nod to Kosovo's Islamic heritage

== Contemporary architecture ==
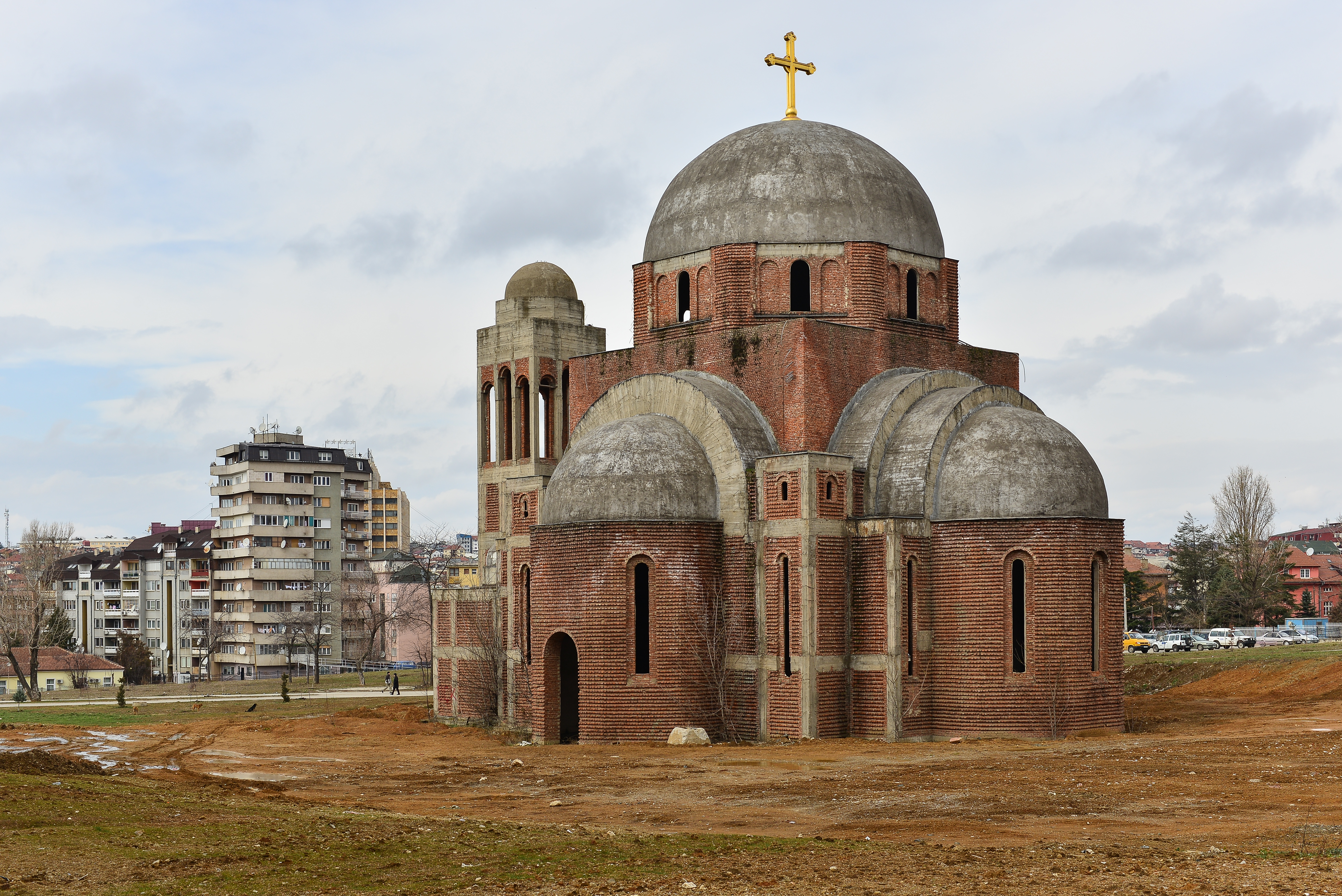
Christ the Saviour Cathedral Pristina February 2013

=== Christ the Saviour Cathedral ===
Construction of the Christ the Saviour Cathedral in Pristina began in 1995; and although it was meant to be finished in 1999, construction was halted by the Kosovo War.

There are different groupings that either support the demolition, the completion or the conversion of the building to a museum. Some Albanians support its demolition or conversion, the reason being that it was built for political and not religious reasons but there are others that support its completion. According to Albanian Architect Eduard Morina who supports demolishing the cathedral or repurposing it, the cathedral "... doesn’t have any architectural values and is not among [listed] cultural heritage objects since it is not an old building" he continues.

Archimandrite Sava Janjic, of the Visoki Decani monastery, on the other hand, strongly support making it functional. According to him, the cathedral is of architectural significance and "... it is a very interesting mixture of traditional and modern architecture, that shows that one must respect tradition, but also look into the future."

After the war in Kosovo, the cathedral was bombed and structural damage was caused to it. In the aftermath of the war the church was bombed by unknown attackers and put under the protection of NATO peacekeepers for some years.

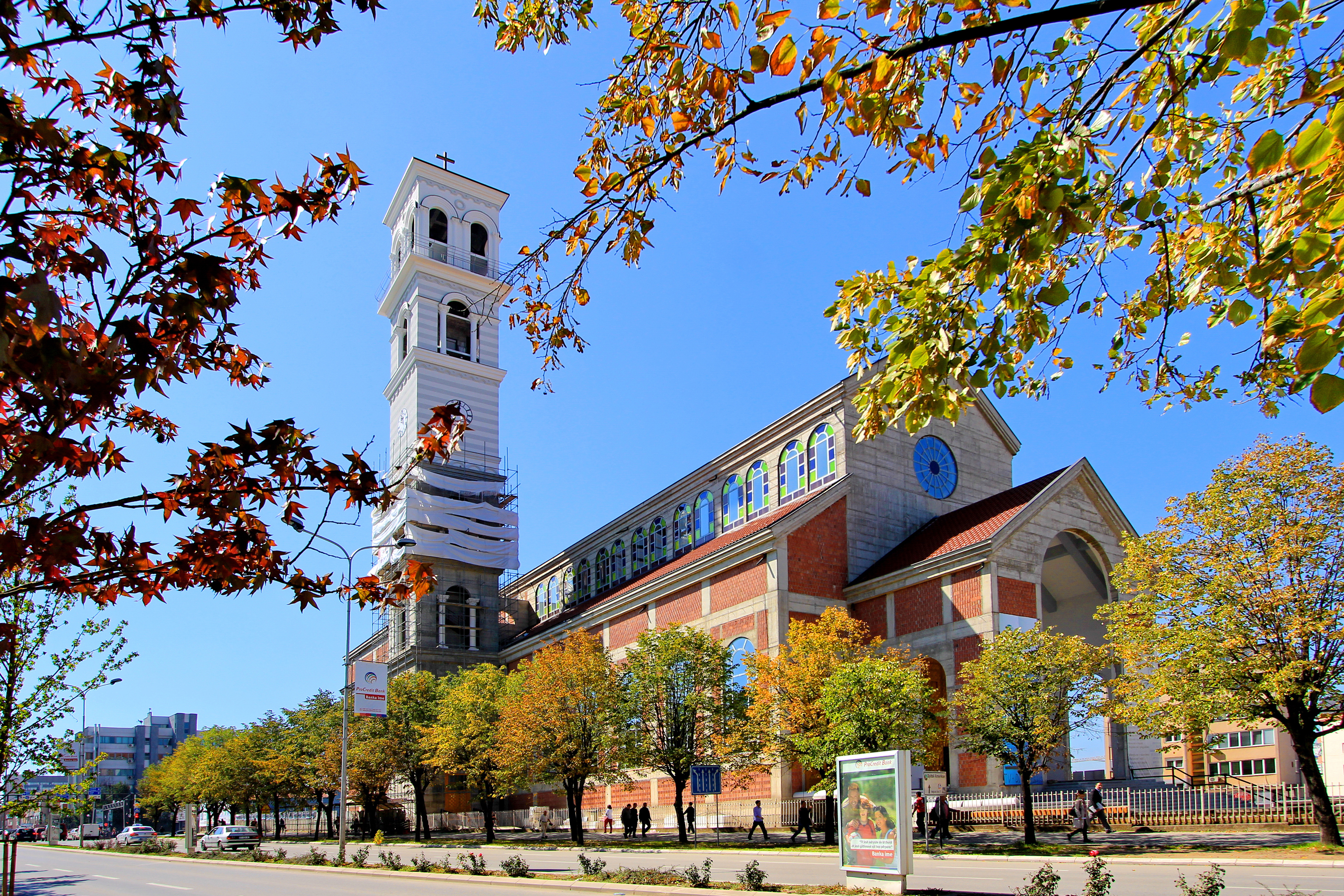
Mother Teresa Cathedral

=== Cathedral of Saint Mother Teresa in Pristina ===
The initiators of the project for building the Roman Catholic cathedral in Pristina are Ibrahim Rugova and Mark Sopi, who set the cornerstone for the building on June 26, 2005. Construction began on September 5, 2007, and it was formally opened by president Fatmir Sejdiu on September 5, 2000.

Its architectural style belongs to the neo-renaissance Italian style from the 16th century, and it was designed by the Architectural Association of Rome. The cathedral has a 70-meter-high tower.

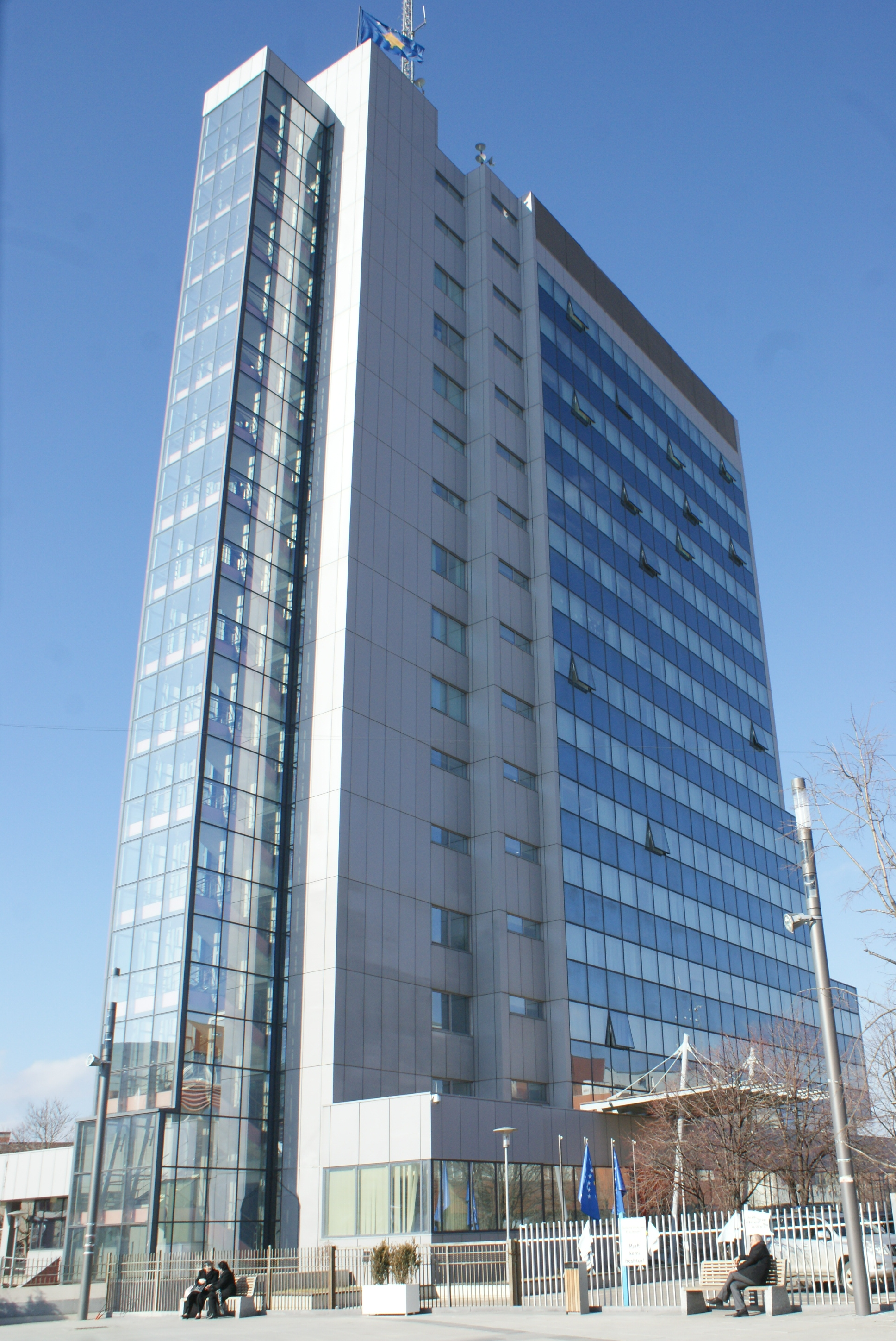
Kosovo Government building

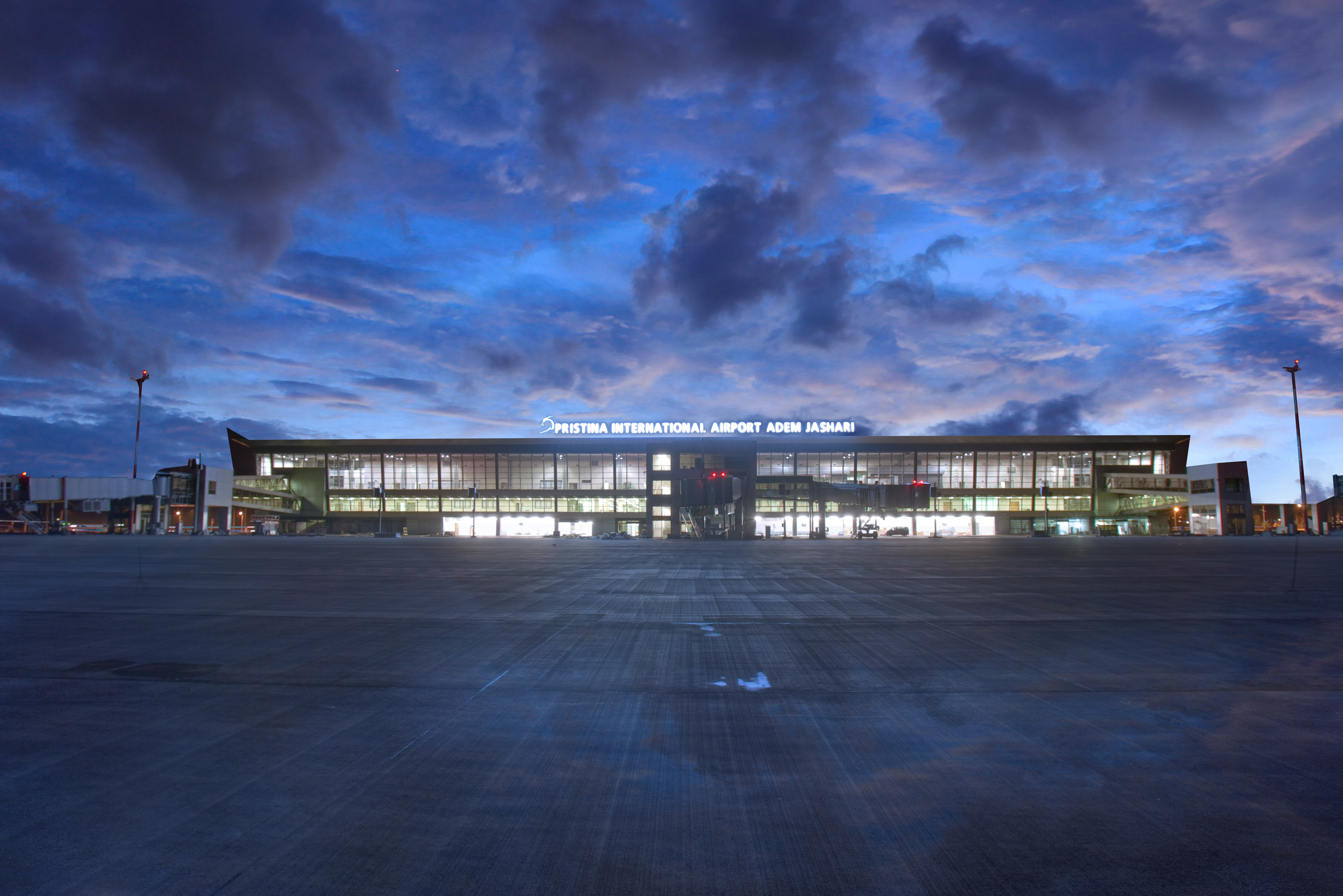
Prishtina International Airport "Adem Jashari"

== Vernacular architecture ==
=== Kulla ===
The type of building called kulla is a fortified residential building built in Kosovo, mainly in the Dukagjin region. The Albanian word kulla means "tower" in English. This is a type of building that was initially built from wood and stone and eventually only from stone. This type of building is typical for the School of National Albanian Building and they have been built exclusively by the Albanian population in Kosovo. They are also the only buildings in Kosovo that haven't been influenced by foreign styles.

Kullas are heavily fortified buildings with small windows and shooting holes, because their main purpose was to offer security in a fighting situation. The first kullas that were built are from the 17th century, a time when there was continuous fighting in the Dukagjini region, although most of the ones that still remain are from the 18th or 19th century. They are almost always built within a complex of buildings with various functions but kullas in towns exist mostly as standalone structures. They are also positioned within the complex of buildings that they exist in a way that makes it possible for the inhabitants to survey the surrounding area. Kullas in towns are usually built as standalone structures, while in villages they are more commonly found as a part of a larger ensemble of kullas and stone houses, usually grouped based on the family clan they belonged to.

Most kullas are three-storey buildings. A characteristic unit of its architectural structure in "Oda e burrave" (Chamber of Men or Gathering Room of Men) which was usually placed in the second floor of the Kulla, called Divanhane, while the ground floor served as a barn for cattle and the first floor was where the family quarters were located. The material from which the Divanhane is constructed, either wood or stone, is sometimes used to classify Kullas.

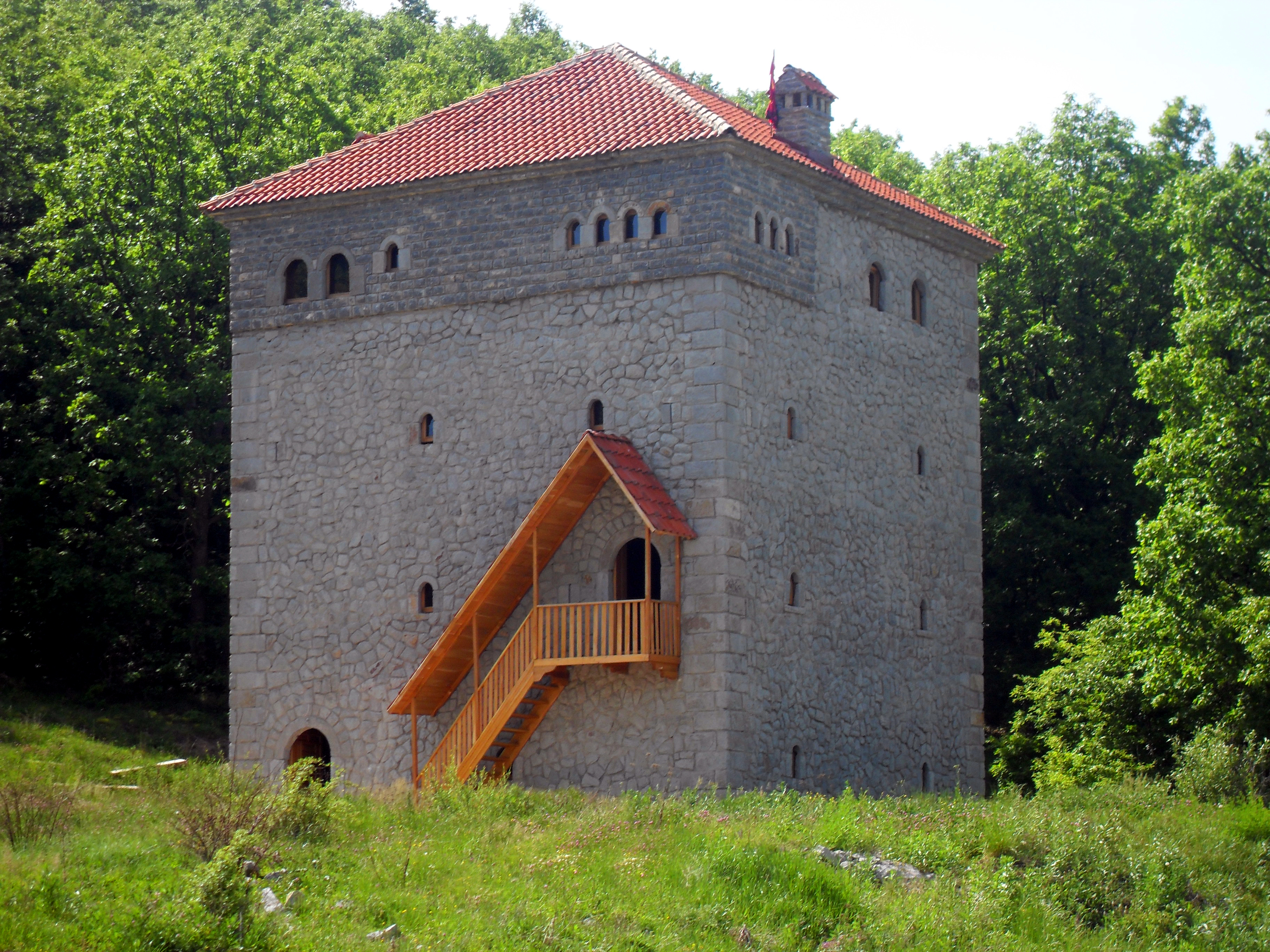
Kulla of Zahir Pajaziti

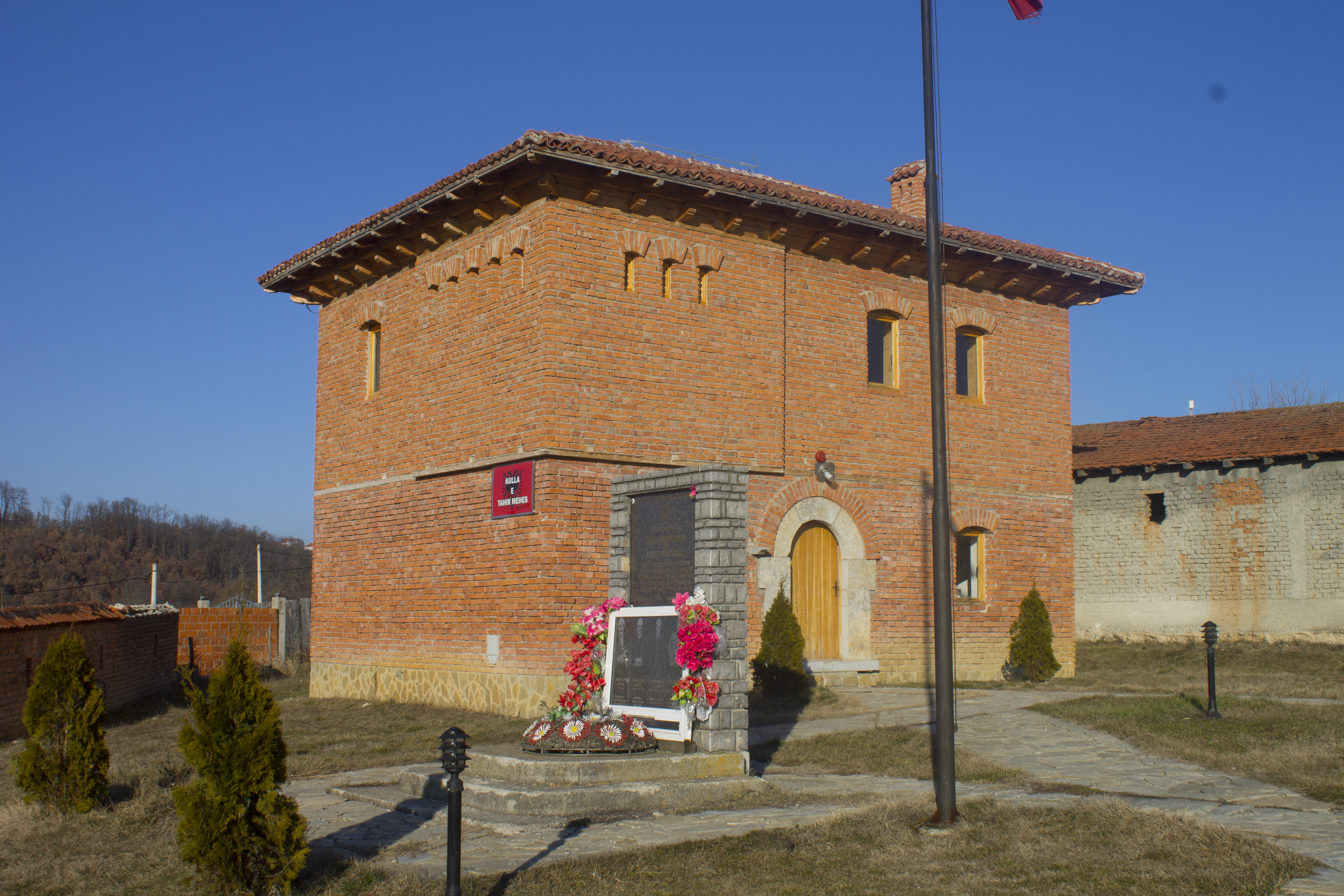
Kulla of Tahir Meha, Prekaz

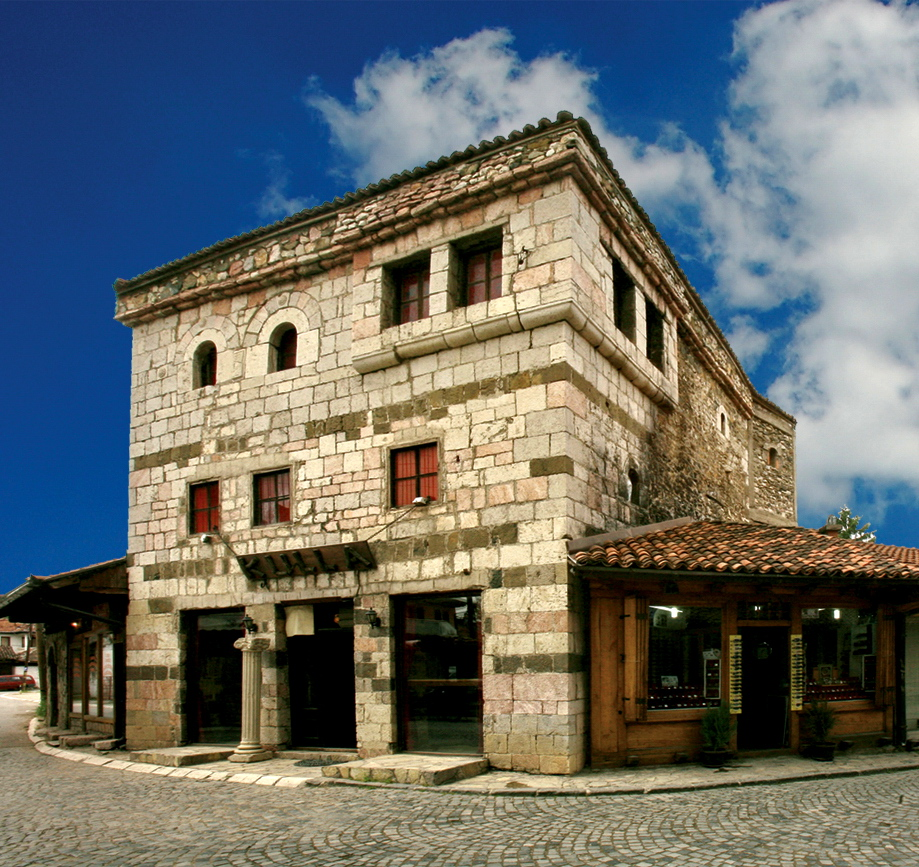
Kulla of Koshi, Gjakovë

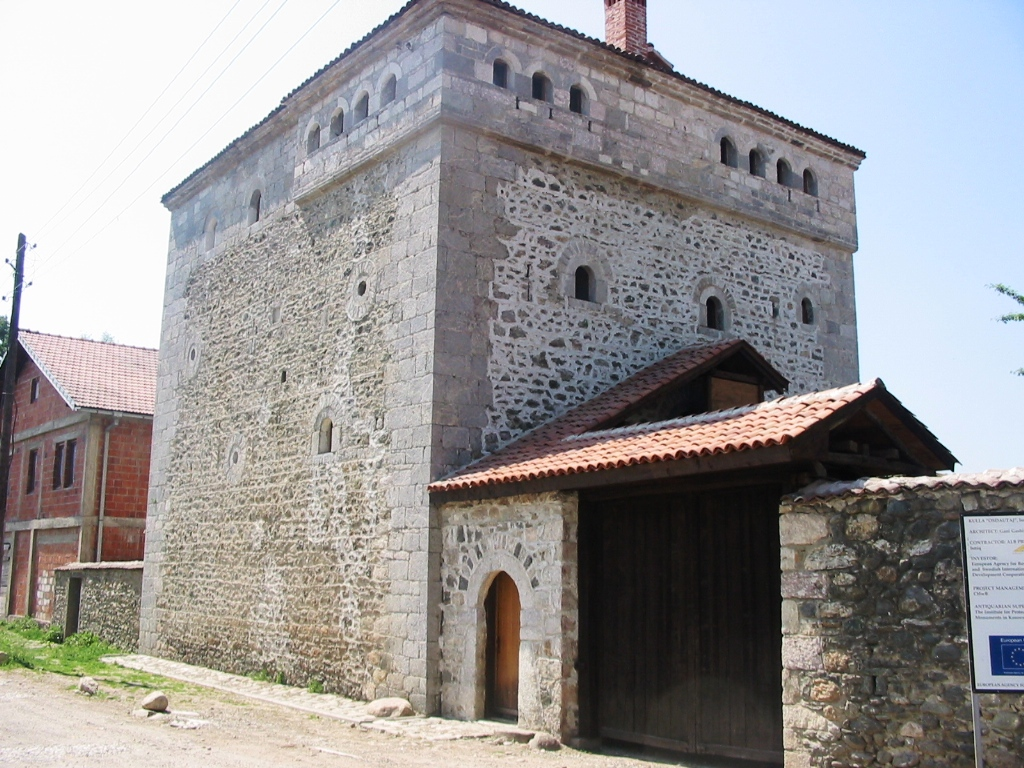
Kulla of Osdautajve, Isniq

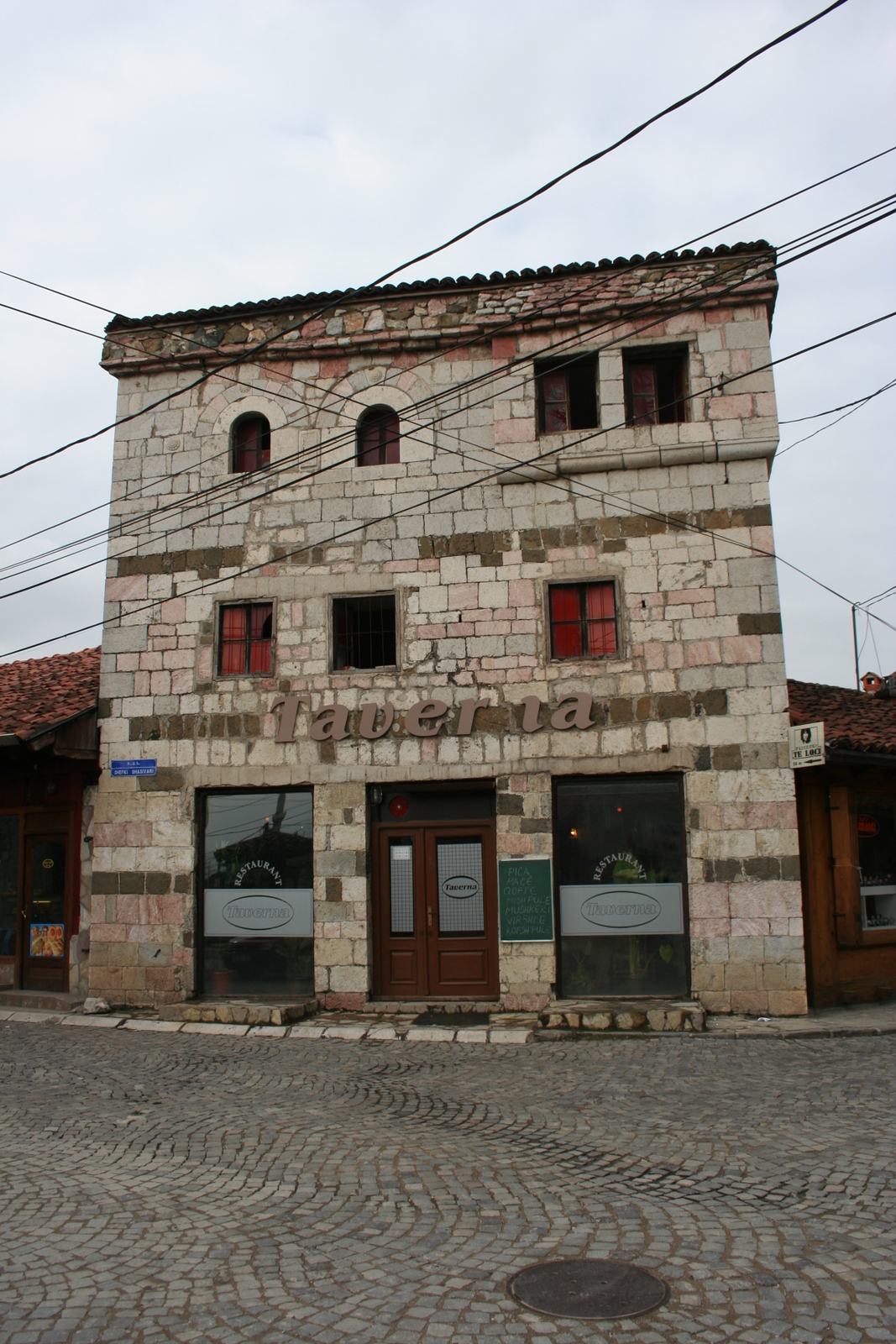
Modernised Kulla, Gjakovë

=== Peja ===
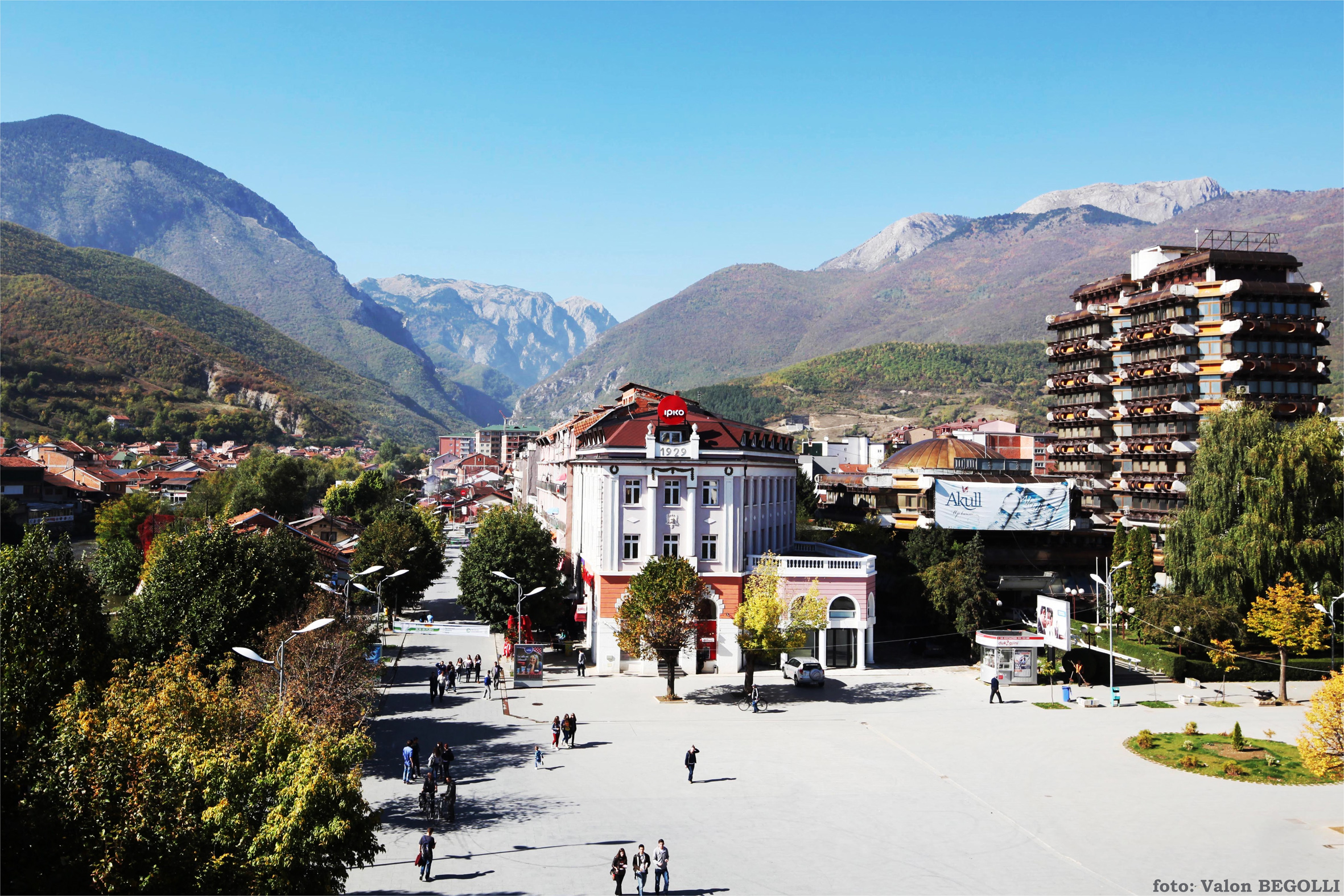
Main square of the city of Peja

The architecture of Peja describes a large mixture of architectural structures which are a reflection of the influential foreign rule all across the city. The architecture of the city consists of buildings, structures and constructions which were built with an architectural influence of the Byzantine architecture, Serbo-Byzantine architecture, Ottoman architecture, Stalinist architecture (former Yugoslavia), and Modern cultures/architectures. Because of this there are many churches, mosques, buildings which are attraction points in the city and were built by the aforementioned influences. The foreign rule of the Ottoman and Serbian empires and the historical influence of former Yugoslavia (communist era) have shaped the architectural landscape of the city to become a conglomerate of cultures.

== See also ==
- Archaeology of Kosovo
- Cultural heritage of Kosovo
- Islamic monuments in Kosovo
- Medieval Monuments in Kosovo
- Monuments of Kosovo
- Destruction of Albanian heritage in Kosovo
- Destruction of Serbian heritage in Kosovo
