= Mehmet Yasar =

Former mayor of Skopje

Mayor of Skopje
- In office 1842–1842

Jashar Mehmet Pasha (alb. Jashar Pashë Gjinolli) was a citizen of Pristina and also the governor of Skopje in 1842. He succeeded Maliq Pashë Gjinolli in this post in 1826. Before that served as his deputy.

He built the Jashar Pasha Mosque in 1834.
