= Qerim (disambiguation) =

Qerim is a village in Gjakova, Kosovo.

Qerim may also refer to:

- Molly Qerim (born 1984), American sports commentator
- Qerim Begolli (1874-1945), Albanian activist during the Second World War
- Qerim Qerimi (born 1980), Albanian-Kosovar university professor
- Qerim Sadiku (1919–1946), Albanian Catholic martyr

== See also ==
- Qerimi, an Albanian surname
