= Sahiti =

Sahiti or Sahithi may refer to:

- Sahiti (Lohana), a subgroup of the Lohana caste in India
- Naser Sahiti (born 1966), Kosovan professor and rector of the University Prishtina
- Sahiti P. Lakshmi, Indian chess player
- Sahithi Varshini Moogi, Indian chess player

== See also ==
- Sahitya (disambiguation)
- Sahith (disambiguation)
