= Sahith =

Sahith may refer to:

- Sahith Theegala (born 1997), American professional golfer
- Sahithya Jagannathan (fl. 2000s–2020s), Indian sports presenter
- Sahithi Varshini Moogi (born 2007), Indian chess player

== See also ==
- Sahitya (disambiguation)
- Saith (disambiguation)
- Sahiti (disambiguation)
