= NEGO =

- Born: Genc Avdyli; 18 January 2002 (age 23); Ferizaj, Kosovo
- Origin: Albania
- Occupations: Singer, record producer, songwriter
- Years active: 2018–present
- Website: www.negoaye.com

Genc Avdyli (born January 18, 2002), known professionally as NEGO, is an Albanian record producer, singer and songwriter. He is best known for his hit song "Karma" which he released in 2020.

== Life and career ==
NEGO was born and raised in Kosovo. He started his career in 2018 as a beatmaker and later as a singer. In 2019, he released his debut song, Gianni.

In September 2020, as a record producer and singer, NEGO released the music video Bandita in collaboration with Valo93. Later in December 2020, he released Karma, which became an instant hit garnering over 7 million views on YouTube.

In 2021, NEGO released another video song, Tu E Lut, which he composed and produced. He also composed music and published a video clip for Ke Ndryshu'. Later in the same year, he also released the music video Paranoja.

In 2022, NEGO released various music videos, including Bebe and Fajsom. In October 2022, he collaborated with the artist 2Ton for the music video Monotonia.

== Discography ==
Year	Release
2019	Gianni
2020	Bad Bitch
2020	Star
2020	Sorry
2020	Bandita
2020	Karma
2021	Tu E Lut
2021	Ke Ndryshu
2021	Pa Pi
2021	Ex
2021	Kallma
2022	Bebe
2022	Forever
2022	Fajsom
2022	Monotonia
