= Economy of Ferizaj =

Coordinates: 42.3667°N 21.1667°E

Ferizaj is a city and municipality in southern Kosovo, located 38 kilometers (24 mi) south of the capital city, Pristina. Ferizaj is the third most populated city in Kosovo, after Pristina and Prizren. It is the administrative centre of the homonymous district. The central city postal code is 70 000, and the currency is euro (€).

== Geographical position ==
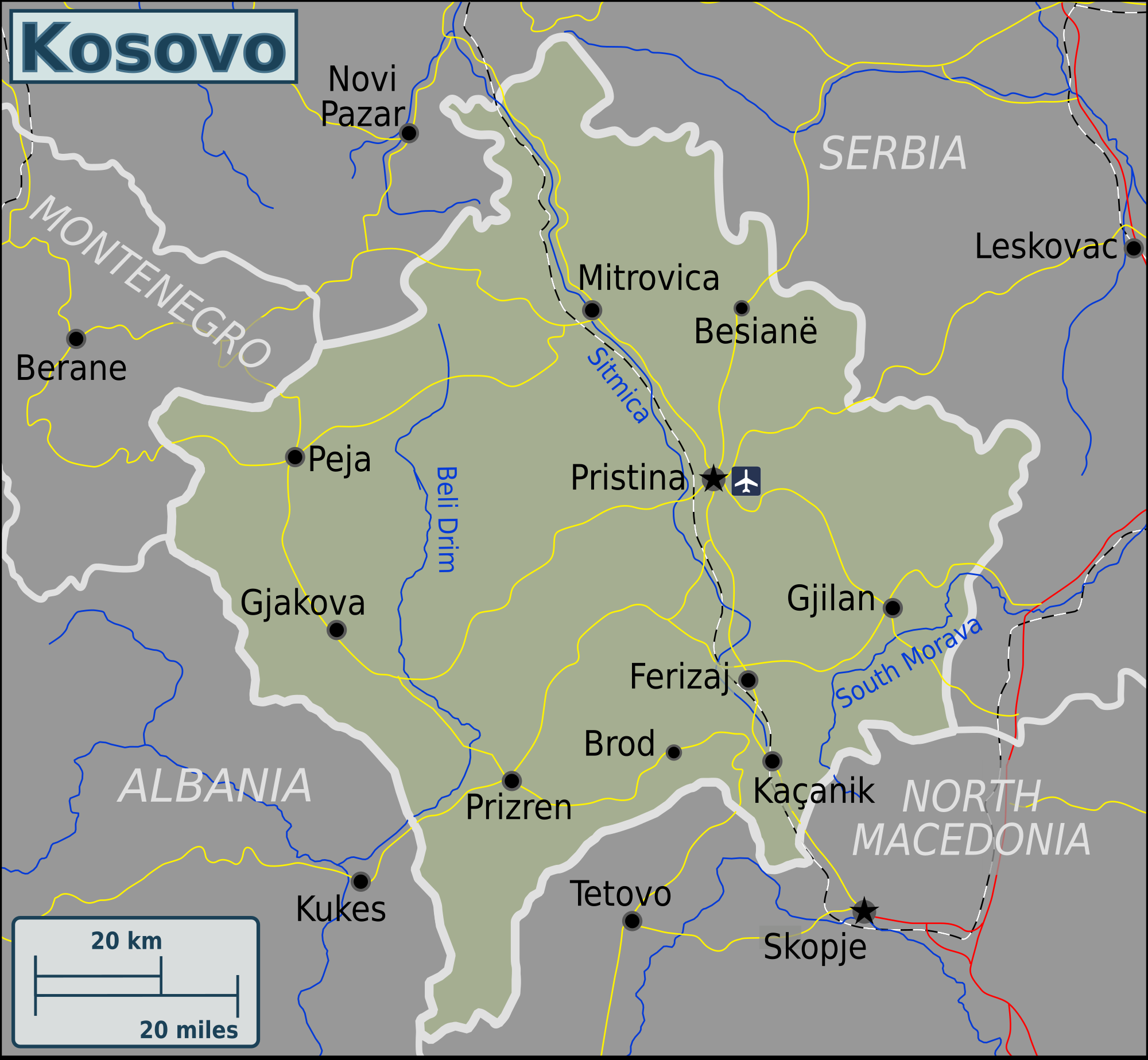
The geographical position of Ferizaj, linking two important capitals in Balkans, Pristina and Skopje

Ferizaj, the third most populated city in Kosovo presents a very suitable geographical and economic position. As one of the major cities of Kosovo, it obtains strong connections with the capitals of the neighboring countries, e.g. Ferizaj - Pristina: 36 km (22 mi), and Ferizaj - Skopje: 48 km (30 mi) which means facility in the field of trade, tourism and other branches of the economy. This is one of the reasons why Ferizaj is taking a sustainable and competitive position in economy.

=== The road network ===
Ferizaj keeps it connections with all the major cities of Kosovo secure. Also, Gjilan has close ties with the European Transport Network. If you look at the map of the municipality, we see clearly that the road network is formed in the center of Ferizaj, which leads to the interurban traffic. Ferizaj is extremely close with Kosovo's main "artery", running north-south highway which connects M2/E65 Pristina to Skopje and in the East-West highway M25-3, which connects Ferizaj with Gjilan and Prizren. Ferizaj also has good ties with Štrpce, Tetovo and Shtime. This is valuable because in Shtime it was responsible for the highway Niš-Durrës.

== Early history ==
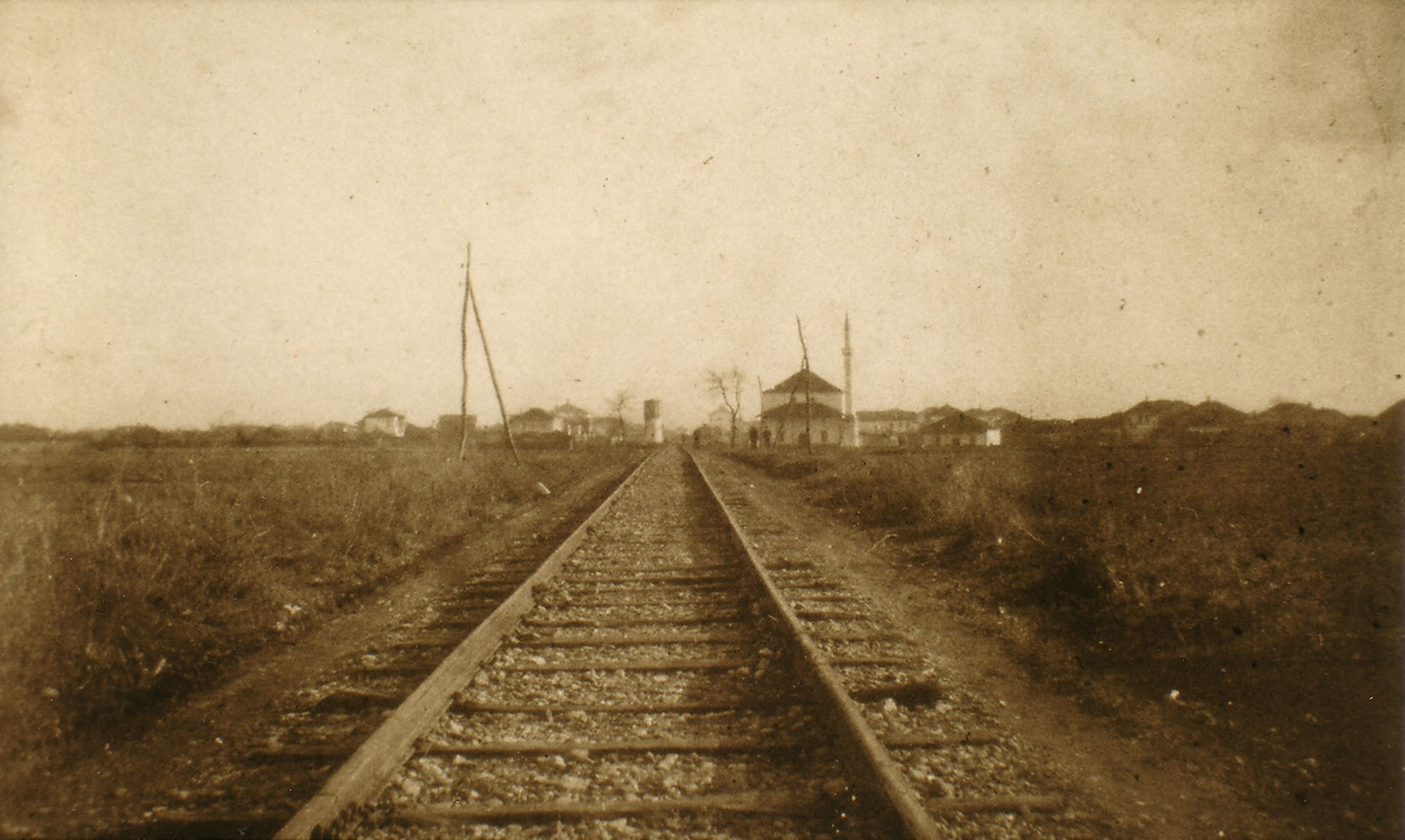
The railway line in Ferizaj 1903

Ferizaj opened the first financial institution which credited "Kisha e Shën Uroshit" in 1907 with a starting capital of 324.000 groschen The first steps of the formation of the city happened at the second half of the 19th century (1873). Due to the formation, it resulted in the trade development - which comprises the tertiary sector of the economy. Therefore, traders have been the earliest inhabitants of the city. One of the most important factors of the historical past of Ferizaj and its economic development is the construction of the railway line and station in the 19th century (1874) during the period of Ottoman Empire occupation, being the first railway line in Kosovo. This construction has been an important asset for the transportation of passengers and goods within Kosovo. Due to the railway line it changed the physiognomy of the settlement, which today is the third most populated city in Kosovo.

== Ferizaj through years ==
Compared with other municipalities, Ferizaj is a relatively new settlement, which means that its economy has developed in the recent years. The earliest base of the economy of Ferizaj were mainly crafts and trade. For example, in 1900, from the 400 buildings Ferizaj had at that time 200 of them were stores. The main craft activities were plis, filigree and shoe makers. One of the first businesses established in Ferizaj was a hotel, whose owner was Feriz Shasivari (from where the name descended). Many factories were built during the occupation of ex-Federation of Yugoslavia in Kosovo, causing rapid industry and economic development. Almost all the enterprises were established at the time of the Second World War (1941), from which only the brick factory is existent from that time. Before the last war in Kosovo that happened in the 90s, Ferizaj had well developed metal, wood processing, food, and construction industries; forestry and agriculture. The collapse of Kosovo's autonomy, followed by the application of violence and massive removal of Albanian workers from their places of work which had major negative consequences on Ferizaj's economy. After the Kosovo war, efforts were made to consolidate these enterprises revitalization and capacities, but the results were not very encouraging. Nowadays, Ferizaj is converted into an important economic center. Some factories and former enterprises still operate to date e.g. "Fabrika e Tubave të Çelikta" (Metal Tubes Factory), "Fabrika e vajit" (Oil Factory), "Kombinati i drurit" (Wood Procession Factory), and "Fabrika e tullave" (Brick Factory), have built the base for the economic development of the municipality.

Even though the municipality of Ferizaj economic development came out of the war with a very fragile economy, its transition period began building a sustainable economic system based primarily on the development of the small and medium enterprises, although not at a satisfactory level. Ferizaj municipality based on geographic position and its resources has a bright perspective in terms of economic development in all its branches. For a short and medium term perspective UNs Economic development opportunities are in the construction industry, wood processing industry, tourism and agribusiness. The credit policy significantly affected the current lending policies unless there are changes. As a result, it will only complicate the developmental perspective in the near future of our municipality and Kosovo in general.

== Natural resources ==
Ferizaj has a large mountainous part covered with trees, the Šar Mountains, which area presents one of the main natural wealth resources, having a very diverse flora and fauna world and distinct minerals that haven't been very well studied yet. The flat areas are mainly covered by deposits of the Neogene era, which contain useful minerals such as quartz sand close to the village of Mirosala, argil, mineral water close to the village of Burrnik, petroleum reserves, zinc and lead. Ferizaj has a plenty of underground resources, including here natural and mineral water. A good example of wise use of these resources is the Miros water processing factory.

=== Table of natural resources ===
Habitations	Underground fortunes	Mines and minerals surfaces	Forest cutting areas
Babush	Coal	Coal	
Bibaj	Quartz sand	Argil	
Burrnik			23%
Dremjak			2%
Jezerc			1%
Koshare	Coal		
Mirosalë		Quartz sand	
Nikadin	Humus		
Pleshinë			10%
Rahovicë			1%

== The role of the Local Administration in the economic development of Ferizaj ==
The municipal administration despite budget difficulties is trying to create the conditions, facilities in all areas for small and medium businesses. In the budget approved for 2008, municipal administration in the capital investment program amounts €2,300,000, a symbolic value, enough for the economic development of the Municipality of Ferizaj. The municipal administration has reached agreements with the investor from Slovenia to build "Technological Park" at the planned industrial area in Gurëz, there will be built about 36 factories of various profiles and will be able to employ about 600 employees, also the municipal administration is in negotiations with the Swedish prestigious firm EC PLAST, which is very interested in technology transfer and its capital in the municipality. Also, the local administration of Ferizaj is in contact with our business who exercise their business abroad, without hesitating to bring their capital experience here in their place, because Ferizaj municipality already is creating adequate conditions for businesses.

== Economic activity ==
1. Trade (48.0%)
2. Transport and Telecommunication (18.0%)
3. Processing industry (10.0%)
4. Hotels and Restaurants (7.00%)
5. Architecture (4.00%)
6. Wealth by rent (2.00%)
7. Education (2.00%)
8. Healthcare (3.00%)
9. Other activities (6.00%)
10. Other (0.00%)

Sectors of the economy development of Ferizaj include :

- The Public Sector or state sector
- The Private Sector or privately run businesses.

In the municipality of Ferizaj. the economic activity is developed by 25 social and private enterprises. The oil factory, which was commercialized in September 2001 has 160 full-time employees. 25 of these employees receive social assistance, and gives support to 20 of them. The average incomes are 325 euro. The other commercialized enterprise is the Exotic fruits' production and processing factory "Minex" which has 210 employees. The privatized enterprises in the municipality of Ferizaj are: "Plantacioni i pemëve" (The trees plantation), has 67 employees, and The Wood Combine named: "Tefik Qanga".

=== Private sector ===
Today, the private sector of economy presents its main economic base. According to the data from the Department for Economy and Finance of the Municipality of Ferizaj the number of small and medium registered businesses reaches 4413, in which businesses are employed 9,137 workers. Ferizaj has its business registration center, where taxes for small businesses is 5 euro, while for corporations is 22 euro. Based on the statistics of Businesses Registration Centre in Ferizaj, for a period of 6 months business activities have legalized over 400 new businesses.

== Development of industry and business in Ferizaj ==
There are a number of aids available to Small-Medium Businesses (NVM) by local organizations and international such as: OEK, EICC, REA, USAID and others. Organizations provide assistance to enable the development of new products and market. Support has also certain institutions in the state level, in order to create the climate in favor of economic development. This refers in particular the establishment of professional education, certification standards, quality management, production, etc. products. All these activities can contribute to the stabilization of NVM-se as important basis of Ferizaj Kosovo economy and liberties for more products in the Kosovo market, while also providing employment opportunities. Authorities in the municipality have many activities undertaken by the genuine development of businesses, ranging from:

- Facilitating access to the site
- Giving consent for the removal of the extended business registration procedures
- The granting of a work permit
- Improving infrastructure etc...

.

=== Problems and challenges ===
- Lack of budget
- Infrastructure
- Cumbersome structure of businesses
- Small existing industrial capacity
- Consumer protection
- Protection and stimulation of production
- Degradation of local tourism resources
- Agricultural land degradation and loss of this activity
- Format and small plots.

.

=== Kellogg Brown & Root ===
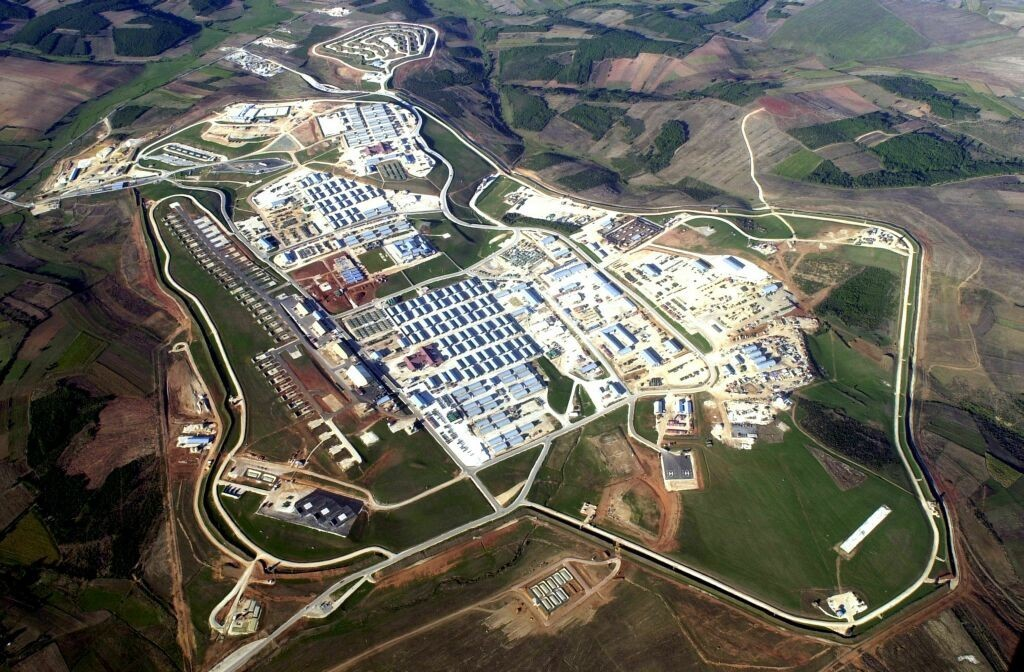
Aerial photo of Camp Bondsteel, KFOR, Task Force Falcon Public Affairs Office, Ferizaj

Brown & Root assisting in constructing the Camp Bondsteel as one of the largest military base in the country, has hired around 7000 employees. Since July 1999, when forces of KFOR entered in Kosovo, to the citizens of Kosovo was offered the opportunity to work for foreign contractors Through Bondsteel many Kosovars saw the possibility of employment in Afghanistan and Iraq. Since 2001 when American military forces entered in Afghanistan, a large number of Kosovars were employed there as a support staff of the army, through contracting company KBR (Kellogg Brown & Root). According to data from banks operating in Kosovo, regional extension of Kosovo employees working in Afghanistan is concentrated in Ferizaj with 56% of total workers in Afghanistan.

== SWOT Analysis ==
SWOT analysis about Businesses

Description	The number of subjects	The number of employees
Agricultural enterprises	4	152
Forestry	1	62
Commercial enterprises	7	353
Processing industry	8	2443
Public utilities	1	58
Construction	2	208
Repairs and maintenance	1	235
Hotels and restaurants	2	46
Transport	2	329
Financial enterprises (insurance)	1	9
Total	25	3743

.

SWOT analysis about industry

Advantages	Disadvantages	Opportunities
Industrial tradition	infrastructure	reactivation of existing infrastructure
The favorable geographic position	unfavorable structure of businesses	Recovery of human-resources professionals
The existence of natural resources	increase in unemployment	restructuring production processes based on flexibility
Human Resources	low utilization of industrial capacity	Investors from the diaspora)
Commercial enterprises	Insufficient professional framework	creating partnerships
The existence of special industrial manufacturing zones	outdated technology	
The existence of the small and medium manufacturing businesses	Insufficient budget	
The process of privatization	fiscal policy and not affordable credit	

.

Swot Analyses about trade

Advantages	Disadvantages	Opportunities	Threats
Geographical position	Infrastructure	The stimulation of local products	The black informal trade
Tradition (Experience)	Predimension of trading capacity		
Natural resources			
The existence of International presence			

.

== Agriculture ==
The city of Ferizaj has agricultural fertile lands. The sector of agriculture of the Ferizaj's region (including: Kaçanik, Štrpce, Hani i Elezit, Shtime) has potential because of the large fund of fertile land, which has supplied many factories (such as oil factory). The quality of these agricultural lands guarantees favorable conditions for the production of agricultural goods (fruits, vegetables), which can be exported outside the city/state due to good geographical position. Agriculture is the main economic sector that provides the largest part of the revenues in the postwar period, because 2/3 of the population lives in the rural areas. Farmer's products in the private sector fulfill the needs of familiar consumption, therefore, there is nothing left for trade. Ferizaj owns 16,954 ha of agricultural land and 13,315 ha of forests, in total 30,269 ha. Grains are agricultural bases for the population, livestock and industrial processing. Earlier there were dozens hectares of trees plantation, but due to the activity of the anthropogenic factor, those hectares of soil were left behind. In the villages of Ferizaj are cultivated : wheat, corn, sunflower, soya, potatoes as described in the following table:

Cereals	Hectares of plantation
Wheat	16,710
Corn	2,960
Forage plants	1970
Oat	380
Vegetables	380
Fruits	350
Potatoes	320
Barley	150

Agriculture is widespread in rural parts of Kosovo, but not intensive, almost at the same development level as other branches of the economy. After the war, Kosovo is facing radical changes to the economic system it has inherited, its transformation from a centralized economic system to an open market economy.

=== Vertisol ===
This type of soil is formed in valleys (200–600 m elevation). Vertisols are present in all forms of relief but mainly in flat lake terraces under semi-arid climate. This is a very common soil in Kosovo and covers considerable areas (108 444 ha or about 10%) in the municipalities of Ferizaj, Lipljan, Orahovac, Vushtrri, Kamenica, Gjilan, Glogovac, Pristina, etc.

=== Pseudogley soil ===
Is present in semi-humid and humid regions with more than 700 mm of rainfall. This soil is present in Ferizaj, Gjakova, Vitina, Podujevo, Prizren, Glogovac, Istok, etc. with totally 40 245 ha or 3.7%.

=== Semigley soil ===
This type of soil is usually associated with fluvisols and takes only 1.26% of the area with most present in Orahovac, Lipljan, Gjilan, Vitina, Gjakova, Shtime, Ferizaj, etc.

=== Apiculture ===
Apiculture is one of the most important and oldest branches of agriculture in our community. Beekeeping resources in Ferizaj are estimated to be around 3,000 hives of bees. In the past two years, the municipality has increased the interest of farmers for the recovery of the agricultural and fruit cultivation sector.

== Tourism ==
Besides the plenty of the natural resources in Ferizaj such as Jezerc mountains and Gryka e Jezercit, a rare hydrographic phenomenon occurs where the bifurcation of the Nerodime River flows in two separate directions, one in the Aegean Sea and the other in the Black Sea. European Commission through the organization Care International has started to implement the project of rural tourism development, which will bring benefits to local people and will create good conditions for accommodation of visitors in rural places, through developing a wide range of sports and recreational activities. Jezerc has mountains and meadows, and is suitable for different kinds of entertainment. Its nature provides recreation opportunities with aeronautical aircraft, also offers opportunities for mountaineering, horseback riding, hunting, fishing, skiing and other.

Nr	Habitation	Natural potentials for tourism development								
Nr	Habitation	Type of tourism				Level			Infrastructure	
Nr	Habitation	Forest	Cultural	Summer	Transit	Local	Domestic	International	Low level	Average level
1	Ferizaj (city)		1		1	1		1	1	1
6	Burrnik	1				1				1
10	Dardani (Tankosiq)				1	1				1
12	Gërlicë				1	1				1
14	Jezerc	1				1				1
16	Koshare				1	1				1
24	Neredime e Epërme			1		1				1
29	Prelez i Jerlive				1	1				1
30	Prelez i Muhaxherëve				1	1				1
34	Slivovë		1				1			1
36	Sojevë				1	1				1
	Total	2	2	1	7	10	1	1	1	11

=== SWOT analyses for tourism ===
Strengths	Weaknesses	Opportunities
Practical geographic position	Lack of good urban planning	Utilization of natural resources
Available natural resources	Lack of good infrastructure	Improvement of the existing infrastructure
Bifurcation of the Neredime river	Insufficient budget	Donations from foreign investors and organizations
Existence of special areas for tourism	Lack of touristic marketing	Development of touristic weekend-areas
