= Trajnimi =

Online e-learning platform

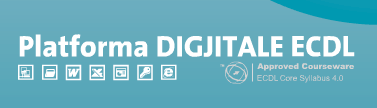
- Website type: E-learning, online education
- Headquarters: Pristina, Kosovo
- Owners: IPKO Institute, Ministry of Education, Science and Technology (Kosovo)
- Creator: Kushtrim Xhakli
- Industry: E-learning
- Website: trajnimi.com
- Registration: Required
- Users: 25000+
- Launched: 2007; 19 years ago
- Current status: Active

Trajnimi is a Kosovo-based free online education e-learning platform that offers training for the European Computer Driving Licence computer literacy certification programme. The platform was created by Kushtrim Xhakli at the IPKO Institute and was launched in 2007.

== History ==
The platform is used as a self study tool and as a teaching resource by educators and general audiences free of charge. The content uses the European Computer Driving License (ECDL) syllabus. Trajnimi received the official certification by ECDL Foundation as the first online IT educational platform in Albanian, accessible for Albanian speaking countries and diaspora.

Prior to Trajnimi launch there was no digital ICT training material in Albanian and face-to-face training was not afforded by the general public. The e-learning platform Trajnimi ('trajnimi' means training in Albanian), started to be developed at the end of 2006 and went live in June 2007. The e-learning platform is based on Adobe Flash.

After launch, the platform was deemed as a national treasure by Kosovo's prime minister, and the following year, it won the best practice award from the ECDL Foundation. The foundation cited the platform for adopting the ECDL "as a means to increase employability."

== National e-Learning education in Kosovo ==
In 2008, the IPKO Institute donated Trajnimi to Kosovo's Ministry of Education, Science and Technology with about 20,000 people registered at the time of transfer of ownership. In the same year Kosovo's Ministry of Education, Science and Technology included Trajnimi as an extracurricular ICT activity in the public schools curricula where IT teachers would use the platform to teach ICT computing to students.

Some universities in Kosovo used Trajnimi as part of their curriculum syllabus including:

- University of Prishtina
- University of Applied Sciences in Ferizaj
- Kolegji Biznesi
- AAB College
- Riinvest College
- Pjetër Budi College

== Awards ==
In 2008 the platform received the "Best Practice Award" by ECDL Foundation, during its annual meeting in Vienna, Austria for the efforts to promote digital literacy and increase employability in Kosovo.

== Discontinuation of Adobe Flash ==
Trajnimi platform will be prematurely out of service after December 31, 2020, following the discontinuation of Adobe Flash.
