= Saith =

Saith may refer to:

- Saith Sakala (born 1996), Zambian footballer
- Fairoz Nuruddin Saith, Indian politician
- Saith, a river for which the village of Tresaith derives its name

== See also ==
- Saith the Lord, 1996 book by author Howard Wandrei
- Saith Seren, Welsh-language community centre and pub in Wrexham, North Wales
- Sahith (disambiguation)
