= Naser Sahiti =

Kosovan university lecturer

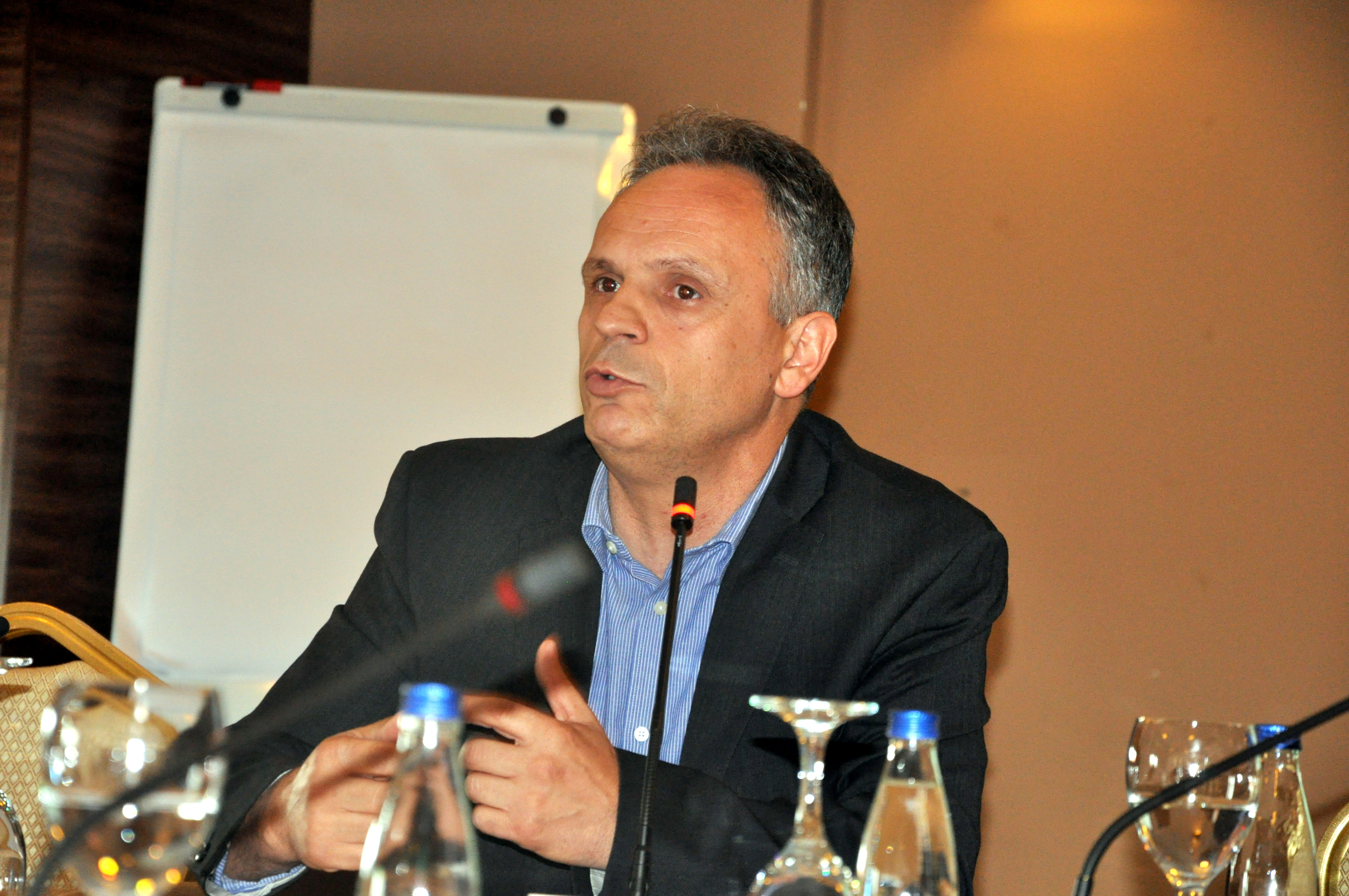
Naser Sahiti 2020

Naser Sahiti (born 12 March 1966) is a Kosovan mechanical engineer, professor, and former rector. He was a Professor of Mechanical Engineering, and served as the Rector of the University of Pristina, from 2020 to 2022.

== Life and work ==
Naser Sahiti was born on 12 March 1966 in Carraleva, Kosovo. Sahiti spent his youth in Carraleve and went to primary school there. After attending vocational college in Shtime and the technical college in Ferizaj he studied mechanical engineering at Pristina University, finishing with a Diploma in Mechanical Engineering with honours (1991). He then became a vocational school teacher in mathematics and informatics at the Naim Frashëri school in Shtime.

In 1996 Sahiti joined Prishtina University as an assistant in mechanical engineering. His focus there was research in and teaching of thermodynamics and thermal turbo-machinery.

In 2001 Sahiti moved to the University of Erlangen-Nuremberg, Institute of Fluid Mechanics. He obtained after five years research the degree Dr. Ing. with the dissertation Thermal and fluid dynamic performance of pin fin heat transfer surfaces

After returning to the university in Pristina Sahiti became Assistant Professor and from November 2013-February 2014 he has the Position Vice Rector for Budget and Finance at the University of Prishtina. From February 2009-October 2009 he was acting as Vice Dean for Teaching Issues at the Faculty of Mechanical Engineering and from September 2018 he was appointed Chief of the Center for Renewable Energy. In 2017 the position as full Professor of Mechanical Engineering. He has been Prorector to Rector Marjan Dema and was elected as his successor in August 2020. On 1 October 2020 he started as Rector of the University of Pristina.

== Publications (selection) ==
- Naser Sahiti has published more than 30 major articles and has an Impact Factor of 24.
- F Bunjaku, RV Filkoski, N Sahiti: Thermal Optimization and Comparison of Geometric Parameters of Rectangular and Triangular Fins with Constant Surfacing. Strojniski Vestnik/Journal of Mechanical Engineering 63, 2017
- F Bunjaku, RV Filkoski, N Sahiti: Toplotna optimizacija in primerjava geometrijskih parametrov pravokotnih in trikotnih reber z enako povrsino Strojniski Vestnik-Journal of Mechanical Engineering 2017 63 (7-8), SI63-SI63
- Naser Sahiti: Interrelation between Pin Length and Heat Exchanger Performance, Applied Thermal Engineering, Vol. 91, pp. 946–952, 2015,
- Naser Sahiti, Fejzuall Krasniqi, Xhamajl Fejzullahu, Januz Bunjaku, Ali Muriqi: Entropy generation minimization of a double-pipe pin fin heat exchanger, Applied Thermal Engineering, (28), pp. 2337–2344, 2008,
- Naser Sahiti, Franz Durst, Paolo Geremia: Selection and optimization of pin cross-sections for electronics cooling, Applied Thermal Engineering, (27), pp. 111–119, 2007,
- Naser Sahiti, Franz Durst, Anupam Dewan: Strategy for selection of elements for heat transfer enhancement, Int. Journal Heat Mass Transfer, (49) pp. 3392–3400, 2006,
- Naser Sahiti, Abdellah Lemouedda, Dragan Stojkovic, Franz Durst, Eberhard Franz: Performance comparison of pin fin in-duct flow arrays with various pin cross-sections, Applied Thermal Engineering, Vol. 26, pp. 1176–1192, 2006,
- Naser Sahiti, Franz Durst, Anupam Dewan: Heat transfer enhancement by pin elements, Int. Journal Heat Mass Transfer, (48), pp. 4738–4747, 2005,
- Naser Sahiti, Fejzuall Krasniqi: Bewertung eines PIM-Wärmetauschers durch Entropieproduktion, Chemie-Ingineur-Technik, (74) pp. 1568–1572, Wiley VCH Verlag, Weinheim, 2002,
- Maria Pascu, Naser Sahiti, Franz Durst: Parametrical Study of the Flat-Tube and Pin Fin Heat Exchangers, ASME International Mechanical Engineering Congress and Exposition, Seattle, Washington USA, 2007,
