= Qerimi =

Qerimi is an Albanian surname. Notable people with the surname include:

- Adem Kerimofski (born 1975), Australian musician whose surname origin is Qerimi.
- Florat Qerimi (born 1997), Swiss-Albanian rapper and producer.
- Luan Qerimi (1929–2018), Albanian actor.
- Qerim Qerimi (born 1980), is an Albanian-Kosovar university professor of politics and international law at the Kosovar University of Prishtina.
