= Church of the Holy Emperor Uroš, Ferizaj =

Serbian Orthodox church in Ferizaj, Kosovo

Coordinates: 42.370425°N 21.150424°E

Church of the Holy Emperor Uroš
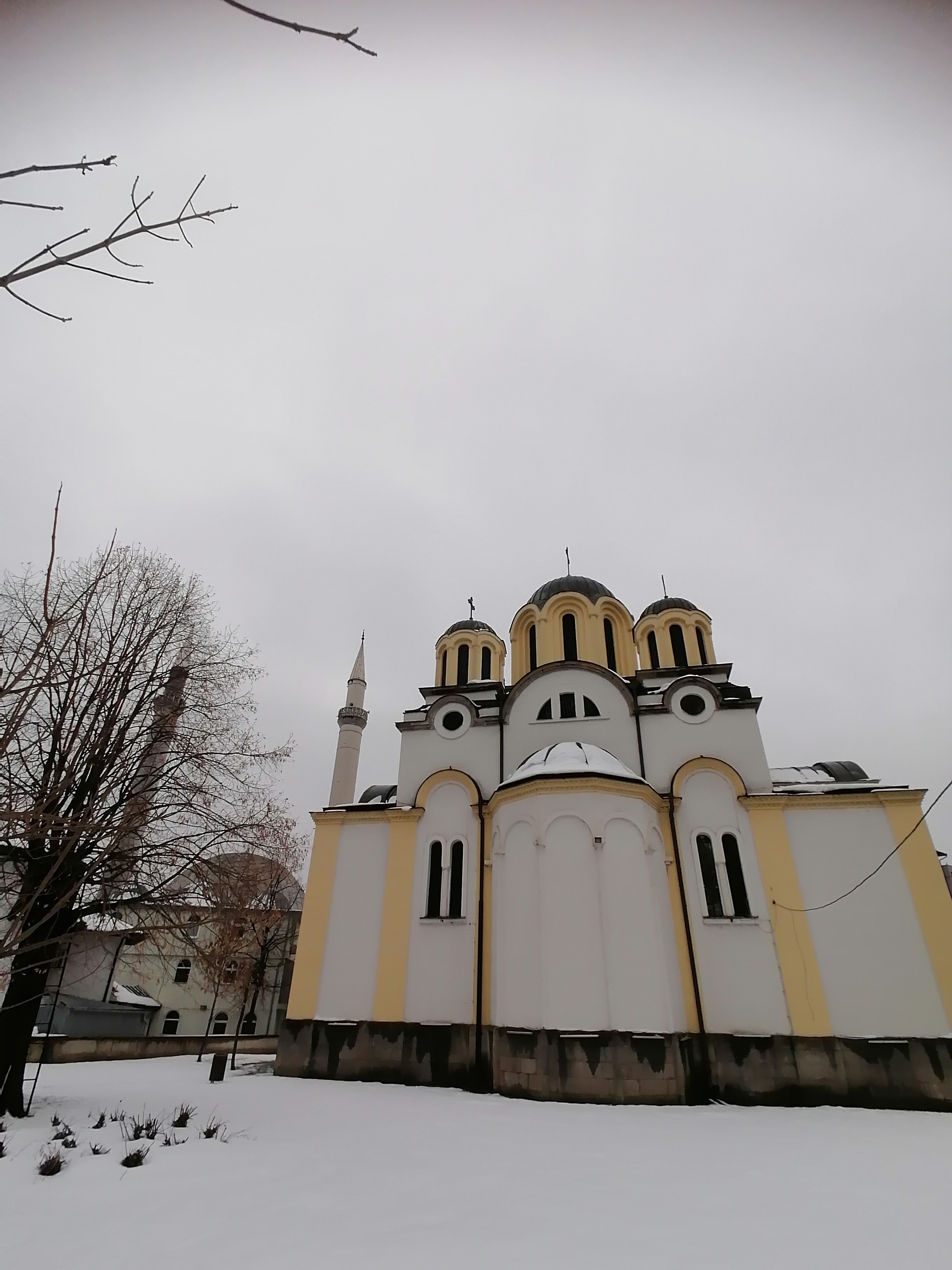

Religion
- Affiliation: Serbian Orthodox
- Year consecrated: 1933

Location
- Location: Ferizaj, Kosovo
- Interactive map of Church of the Holy Emperor Uroš

Architecture
- Cultural Heritage of Serbia
- Official name: Crkva Sv. Kralja Uroša
- Type: Monument of Culture
- Designated: 17 February 2000

The Church of the Holy Emperor Uroš (Serbian: Црква Светог цара Уроша, romanized: Crkva Svetog cara Uroša) is a Serbian Orthodox church located in the center of Ferizaj in Kosovo. It belongs to the Eparchy of Raška and Prizren.

The church was built between 1929 and 1933, dedicated to Serbian emperor Uroš V (r. 1355–71). Its architect was Josif Mihajlović Jurukovski from Skopje. It was built as a five-domed building with a trefoil base, and made of concrete, stone and brick mix which was later plastered. The church of the Gračanica monastery served as a model for the diverse composition of the upper part of the temple. The decoration in the dome consists of chess box with crosses, floral motifs and bricks. The main dome rests on four free pillars.

The murals were painted by Janko Kuzmanović from Galičnik, from 1932–36, who, along with Viktorija Puzanova from Mitrovica, created the throne icons and richly carved iconostasis decorations. The collection of Serbian medieval iconography, including the icon of the Holy Trinity, painted by Josif Radević from Lazaropolje in 1896. The iconostasis is from the 19th century, made in wood, and it was a gift of the Serbian King Aleksandar I Karađorđević.

The church was looted and set on fire by Albanians after the arrival of the US KFOR forces in town, at the end of June 1999. It was attacked in the 2004 unrest, and Albanian nationalist graffiti were painted on the walls in 2013.

In 2015 work on the exterior began. In September 2016, more than 200 Serb former inhabitants of the town (pre-war 12,000 Serbs, now only three), participated in liturgy in the church.

== See also ==
- Eparchy of Raška and Prizren
- Destruction of Serbian heritage in Kosovo

== Annotations ==
1. The official name of the church is "Church of the Holy Emperor Uroš" (црква Св. Цара Уроша, црква Светог Цара Уроша). It is also known in Serbian as the Saborni hram svetog cara Uroša (Саборни храм светог цара Уроша), which could be translated into "Cathedral/Temple of the holy emperor Uroš". Other names include "Church of the Holy King Uroš", "Church of Holy King Uroš", "St. Uroš Cathedral", "Church of St. Uroš", etc. The church building is sometimes referred to as a "cathedral" because of its size although it is not a cathedral in the technical ecclesiastical sense, as it is not the seat of a bishop. In Serbian it is called hram (temple), which is another name for a church in Eastern Orthodoxy.

== Sources ==
- "Crkva Sv. Kralja Uroša". Serbian Academy of Sciences and Arts. 2006.
- "18 Church of the Holy King Uroš. Ferizaj/Uroševac". Council of Europe. Archived from the original on 7 February 2011.
