= Qerim Qerimi =

Albanian-Kosovar professor of politics (born 1980)

- Born: December 10, 1980 (age 45); Socialist Federal Republic of Yugoslavia
- Education: University of Pristina
- Occupation: Professor

Qerim Qerimi (born December 10, 1980, in SFR Yugoslavia) is an Albanian-Kosovar university professor of politics and international law at the Kosovar University of Prishtina. He has been the rector of Hasan Prishtina University since November 2022.

== Biography ==
Qerim Qerimi has been a professor at the Faculty of Law, University of Pristina. He teaches Public International Law, International Human Rights Law and International Organizations, as well as Environmental Law, International Environmental Law and Diplomatic and Consular Law. Querim Qerimi is a visiting professor at the Law Faculty of the University of Antwerp in Belgium, a member of the Venice Commission of the Council of Europe, Chair of the Sub-Commission on the Protection of National Minorities, and former vice-chair of the Sub-Commission on the Rule of Law of the Venice Commission.

Previously, Qerimi was a research fellow at the Max Planck Institute for Comparative Public Law and International Law in Heidelberg, Germany, and spent graduate and postdoctoral fellowships at Harvard University as a recipient of the U.S. Government's J. William Fulbright Fellowship has attended The Hague Academy of International Law. Qerimi is a former member of the European Commission.

In the rectorate election to succeed Marjan Dema and Naser Sahiti, Qerimi successfully won against five other candidates in 2022.

== Publications (selection) ==
- Smart Technologies, Human Security and Global Justice in Smart Technologies for Society, State and Economy (Springer Nature Switzerland, 2020).
- The Normative Power of Dialogue and Debate about Democracy through Law: Empirical Expressions of the Venice Commission's Role in Shaping Transnational Constitutional Justice in Venice Commission: Thirty-year Quest for Democracy through Law (Juristförlaget i Lund, 2020).
- Global Regulation of Carbon Capture and Storage (CCS) as a Climate Change Mitigation Strategy: Prospects, Process and Problems in Entrepreneurship for Social Change, Emerald Publishing Group (Cole C. Scanlon and B.S. Sergi eds., Emerald Publishing Group, forthcoming, 2020).
- Imagination, Invention and Internet: From Aristotle to Artificial Intelligence and the Post-human Development and Ethics in The 21st Century from the Positions of Modern Science: Intellectual, Digital and Innovational Aspects, Springer (E.G. Popkova and B.S. Sergi eds., 2019).
- Human Dignity in Kosovo's Legal Order in Handbook of Human Dignity in Europe (Paolo Becchi and Klaus Mathis eds.), Springer International Publishing (2019).
- International Law of Human Rights [E Drejta Ndërkombëtare e të Drejtave të Njeriut] (with G. Zyberi) (2015).
- Development in International Law: A Policy-Oriented Inquiry. BRILL – Martinus Nijhoff Publishers: Leiden and Boston (2012).
- The Political Economy of Southeast Europe from 1900 to the Present: Challenges and Opportunities. The Continuum International Publishing Group: New York and London (2008; with B.S. Sergi).
- Global Economic Crisis, Social Welfare and Social Disparities in South East Europe: Understanding the Crisis Effects on Employment in The Social Dimension of EU Enlargement (pp. 101–123), Foundation for European Progressive Studies, Brussels, 2014.
- A Values-Based Approach to Development: Principles of Content of Development, the Right to Development, and Sustainable (Human) Development (in William T. Bagatelas, Getnet Tamene, David Reichardt and Bruno S. Sergi eds.), Studies in Economics and Policy Making: Central and Eastern European Perspectives, Budrich UniPress Ltd., Opladen & Farmington Hills, MI 2010.
