= Sahitya =

Sahitya literally means literature in Sanskrit.

Sahitya may also refer to:

- Dasa sahitya, genre of literature of the bhakti movement composed by devotees in honor of Vishnu or one of his avatars
- Sahitya Akademi, the National Academy of Letters of India

== See also ==
- Sahith (disambiguation)
- Sahiti (disambiguation)
