= Camp Bondsteel =

Headquarters of the NATO-led Kosovo Force

- Ferizaj, Kosovo
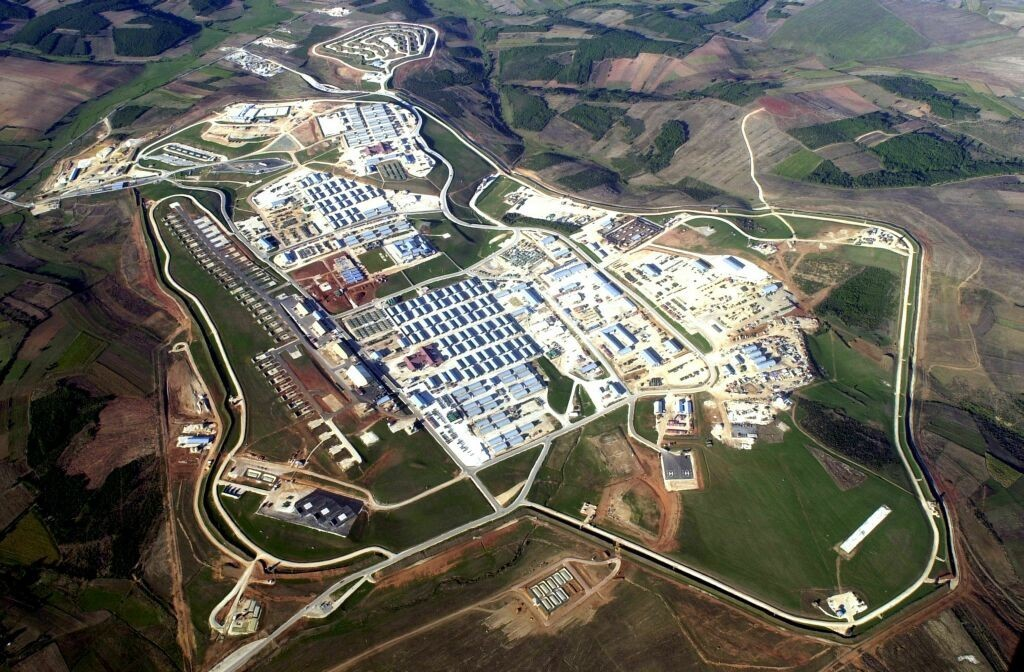
- Aerial photo of Camp Bondsteel

Site information
- Type: Military base
- Controlled by: United States Army

Location
- Location of the military base Camp Bondsteel within Kosovo
- Coordinates: 42°21.94′N 21°14.9′E

Site history
- In use: 1999–present

Airfield information
- Identifiers: LID: BK12
- Elevation: 1,944 feet (593 m) AMSL
Helipads
Number	Length and surface
VIP	60 by 60 feet (18 m × 18 m) Asphalt
MED	50 by 50 feet (15 m × 15 m) Asphalt
MED	100 by 80 feet (30 m × 24 m) Asphalt
VFR	60 by 60 feet (18 m × 18 m) Asphalt
SLING	195 by 185 feet (59 m × 56 m) Asphalt
	65 by 60 feet (20 m × 18 m) Asphalt
- Sources: DoD FLIP

Camp Bondsteel is the operation headquarters of the Kosovo Force (KFOR) in Kosovo. It is located near Ferizaj in southeastern Kosovo. It is the Regional Command-East headed by the United States Army (U.S. Army) and it is supported by troops from Greece, Italy, Finland, Hungary, Poland, Slovenia, Switzerland and Turkey. The base is named after U.S. Army Staff Sergeant James L. Bondsteel, who is a Medal of Honor recipient.

The camp occupies 955 acres (1.492 sq mi; 3.86 km^{2}) of land. During the construction of the base, two hills were flattened and the valley between them was filled. In August 1999, 52 helipads were constructed on the facility's west perimeter to handle helicopter aviation. The camp is built mainly of wooden, semipermanent SEA (Southeast Asian) huts and is surrounded by a 2.5 m (8.2 ft) high earthen wall.

== Facilities ==
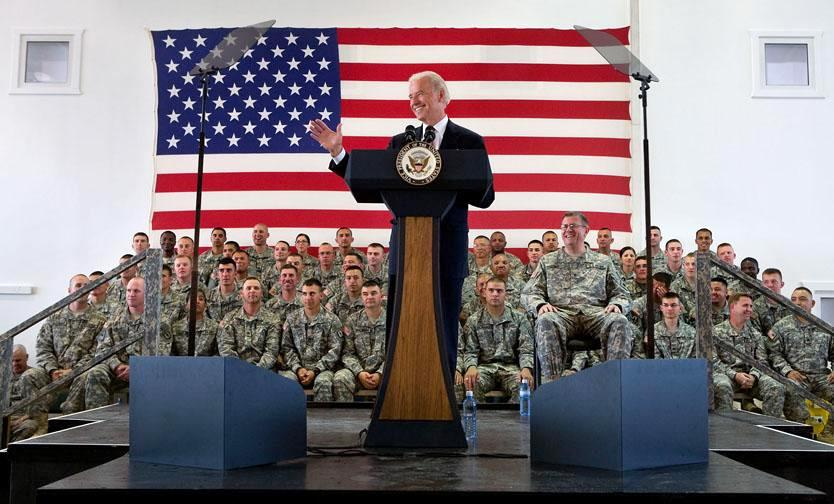
Then-U.S. Vice President Joe Biden visiting Camp Bondsteel, May 2009

Camp Bondsteel was constructed by the 94th Engineer Construction Battalion, augmented by A Company, 864th Engineer Battalion and the 568th Combat Support Engineer Company, together with the Kellogg, Brown and Root Corporation (KBR). KBR was also the prime contractor for the operation of the camp. The planning, design, and construction management of the project was completed by the Construction Management Section of the 130th Engineer Brigade and a team from the Baltimore District of the U.S. Army Corps of Engineers.

Camp Bondsteel has several facilities on base, all built with US military aid, that are used by both soldiers and civilian employees alike. The base can house up to 7,000 soldiers, making it the largest American base in the Balkans. The post exchange (PX) is the largest military exchange in Southeastern Europe and contains various necessities and luxuries. All of this is housed in the PX's two-story building.

The base also has a hospital, two gyms, and two recreation buildings with phones, computers, pool tables, and video games. Camp Bondsteel also has a chapel, a large dining facility, a fire station, a military police station, two bars and three restaurants. There is also a barber shop, a laundry facility employing local nationals, a dry cleaner, a tailor, various local vendors who sell Kosovo souvenirs and products, and sports fields.

== Prisoners ==
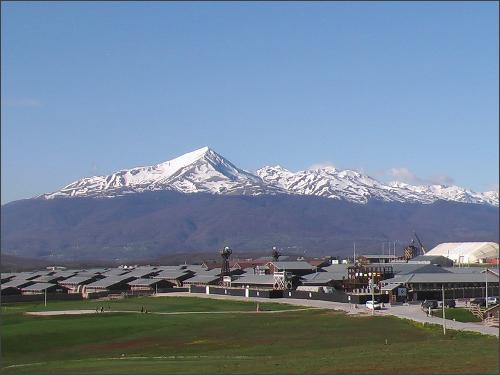
"Big Duke" (Mt. Ljuboten) looming over Camp Bondsteel

Camp Bondsteel is not open to inspections by the Committee for the Prevention of Torture (CPT), which has the right to visit all "places of detention" of the member states of the Council of Europe. Negotiations with KFOR were underway but were suspended because of Kosovo's unilateral declaration of independence, which was not recognised by the Council of Europe. The United States Army had been criticised for using the base as a detention facility for suspected terrorists. In November 2005, Álvaro Gil-Robles, the human rights envoy of the Council of Europe, described the camp as a "smaller version of Guantanamo" following a visit. Robles confirmed that the detention facilities belonged to KFOR, not any U.S. government agency, and "..the then KFOR boss, General Marcel Valentin, helped me as much as he could during my visits. There was no attempt to hide anything or hush anything up." The prisoners at the site when Robles visited had been jailed by KFOR under KFOR authority. The US Army denied the accusation that the detention facilities "were a smaller version of Guantanamo" and stated that there were no secret detention facilities in the Camp.

== Gallery ==
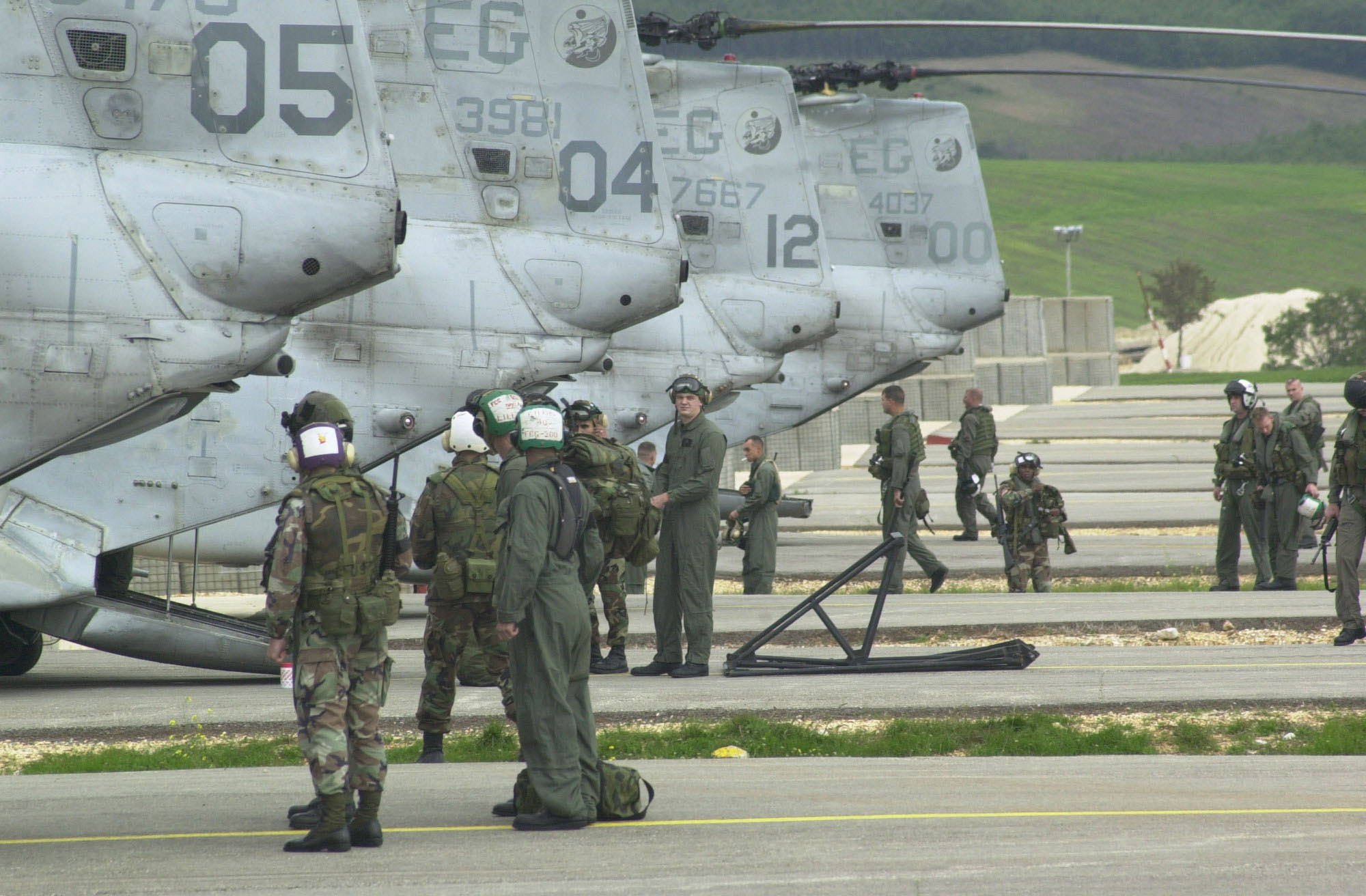
Airfield at Camp Bondsteel, 2002

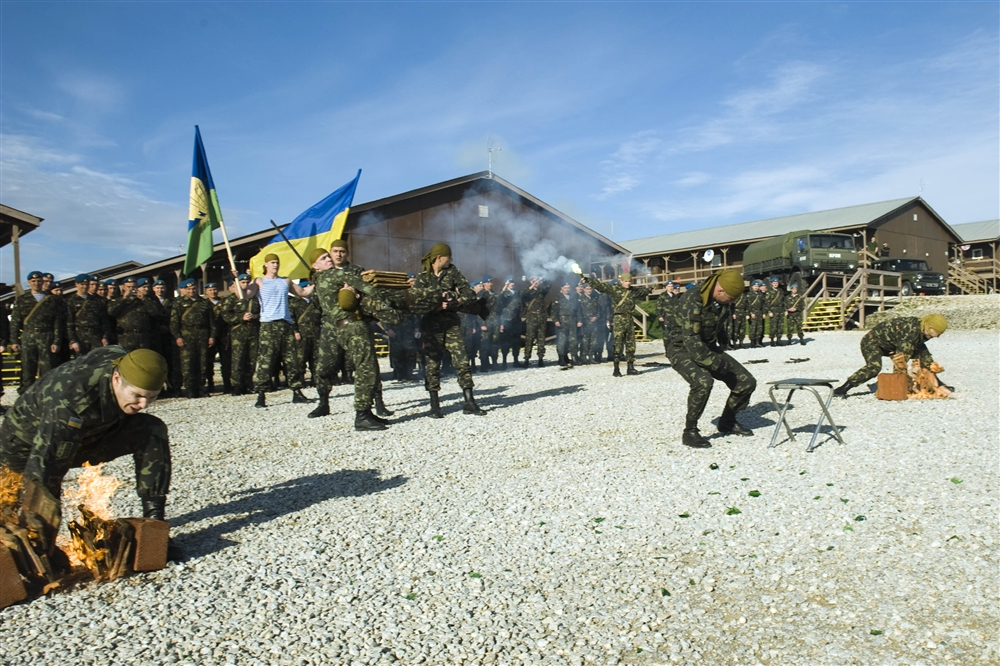
Ukrainian soldiers from the 79th Airmobile Brigade at Camp Bondsteel, 2010

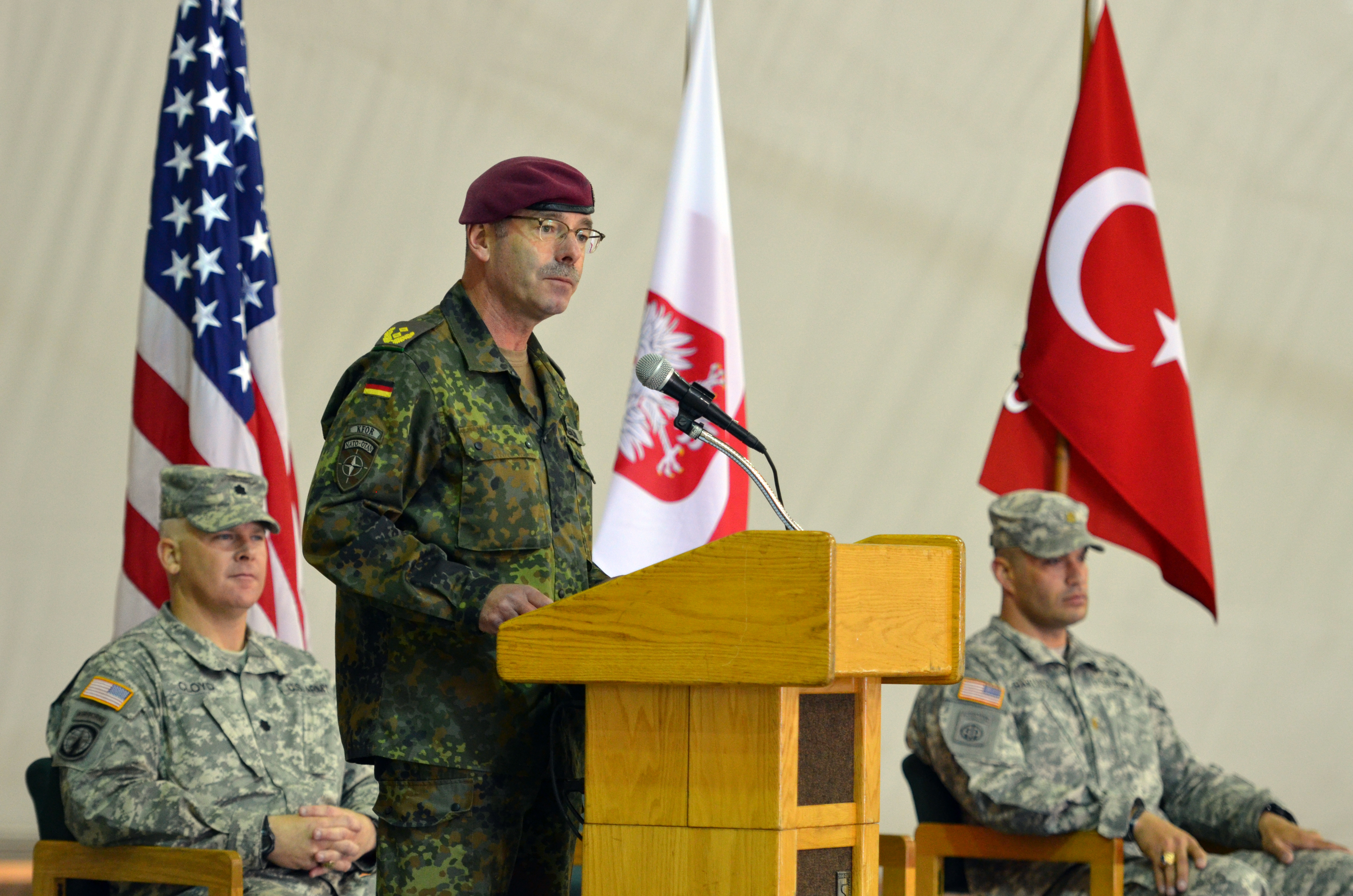
Volker Halbauer, the commander of the NATO-led Kosovo Forces, 2013

== See also ==
- List of United States military bases
- International recognition of Kosovo
