= University of Applied Sciences in Ferizaj =

Public university in Ferizaj, Kosovo

Coordinates: 42.3663°N 21.1684°E

University of Applied Sciences Ferizaj
- Universiteti i Shkencave të Aplikuara në Ferizaj
- Former names: Ferizaj High Technical School (until 2005); Faculty of Applied Sciences in Ferizaj (2005–2015)
- Type: Public
- Established: 14 May 1976; 50 years ago 16 July 2015; 10 years ago (current form)
- Rector: Agron Bajraktari
- Academic staff: 57
- Students: 1,545
- Location: Ferizaj, District of Ferizaj, Kosovo
- Campus: Urban
- Website: https://ushaf.net/

The University of Applied Sciences in Ferizaj (UASF) formerly known as the Faculty of Applied Sciences in Ferizaj (FASF), is a public institution of higher education located in Ferizaj, Kosovo.

== History ==
The history of the University of Applied Sciences in Ferizaj started in 1976 when the Municipal Assembly of Ferizaj by Decision No. 01-612-1/76 of 14/05/1976 established the Higher Technical School. On 5 September 2005, the High Technical School was transformed into the Faculty of Applied Technical Sciences. In the academic year 2008–2009, master's studies were opened in the Department of Wood Industry. On 6 July 2015, by decision of the Ministry of Education of Kosovo and ratified by the Assembly of Kosovo on 16 July 2015, the Faculty of Applied Sciences in Ferizaj was transformed into the University of Applied Sciences in Ferizaj.

== See also ==
- Education in Kosovo
- University of Prishtina
