= Ferizaj =

Third largest city of Kosovo

Ferizaj: Ferizaj or Ferizaji (Albanian) Uroševac or Урошевац (Serbian)
- City and municipality
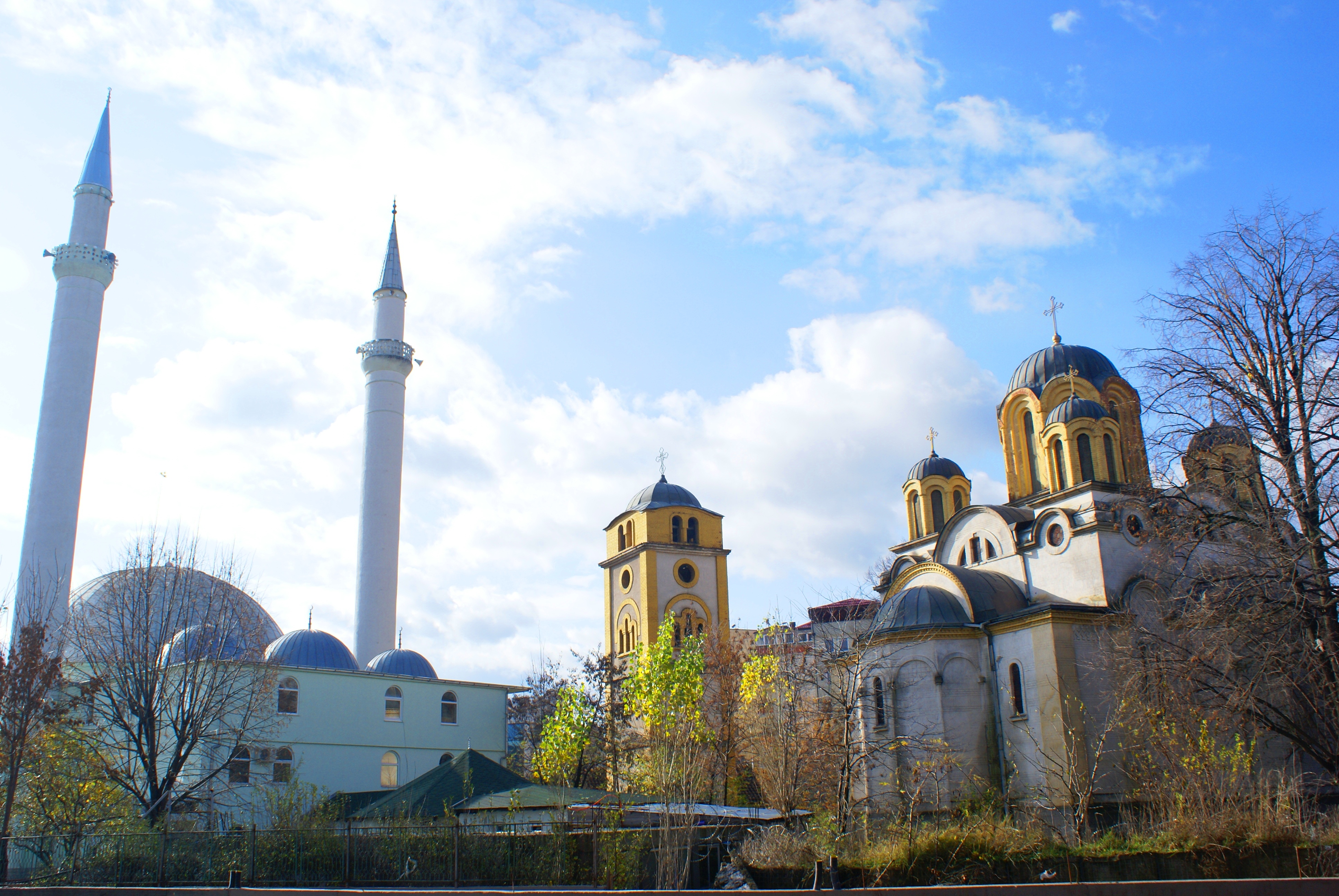
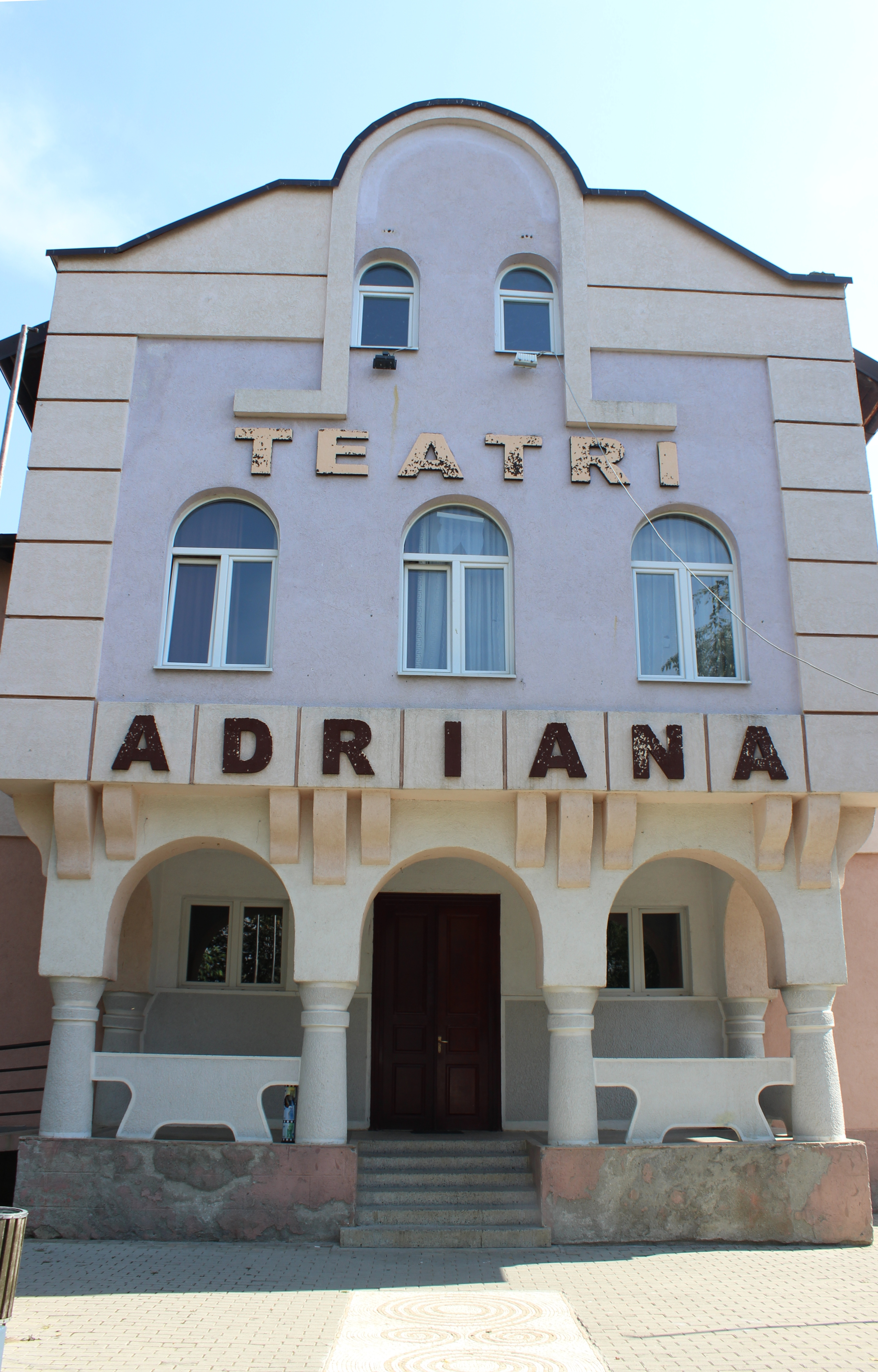
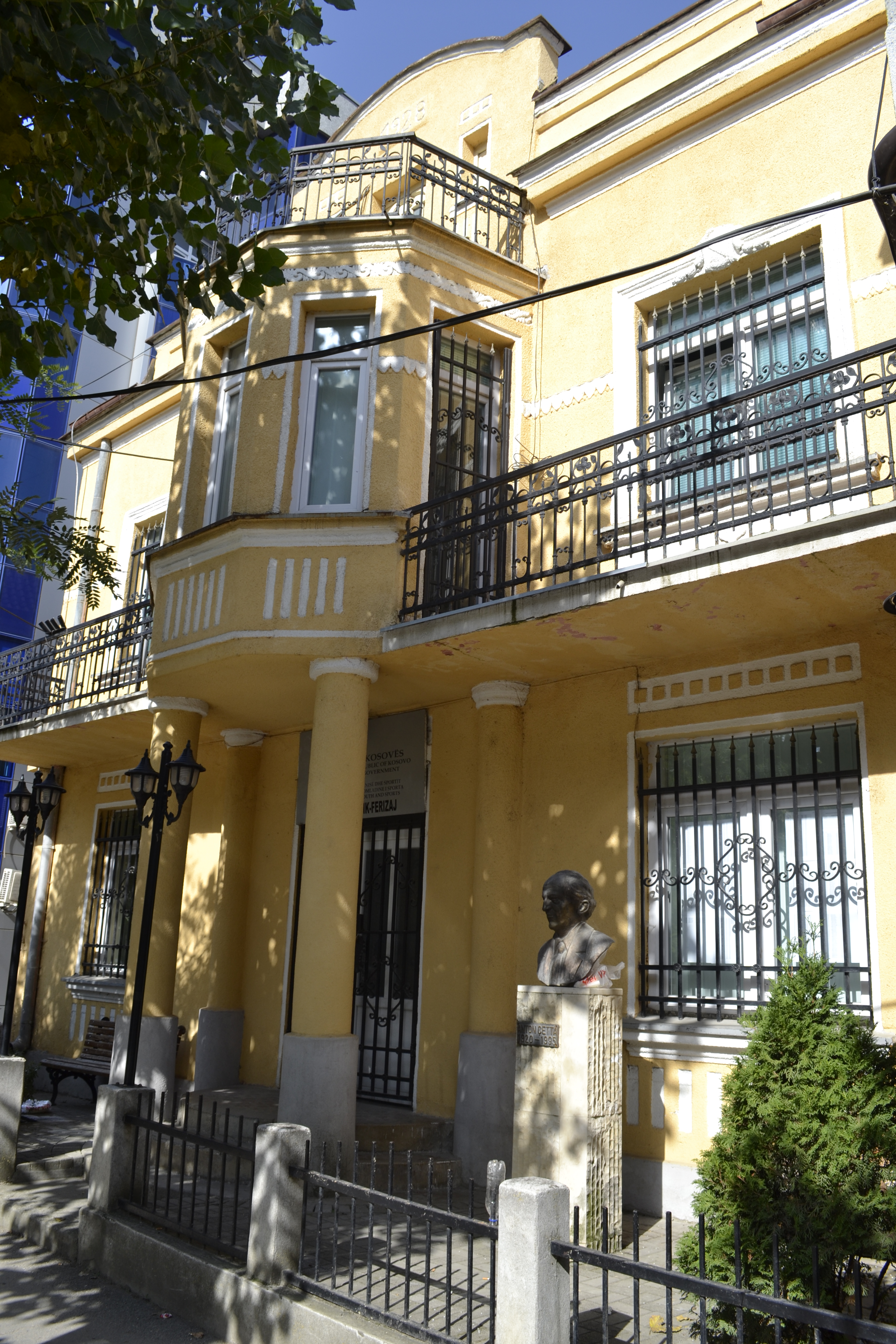
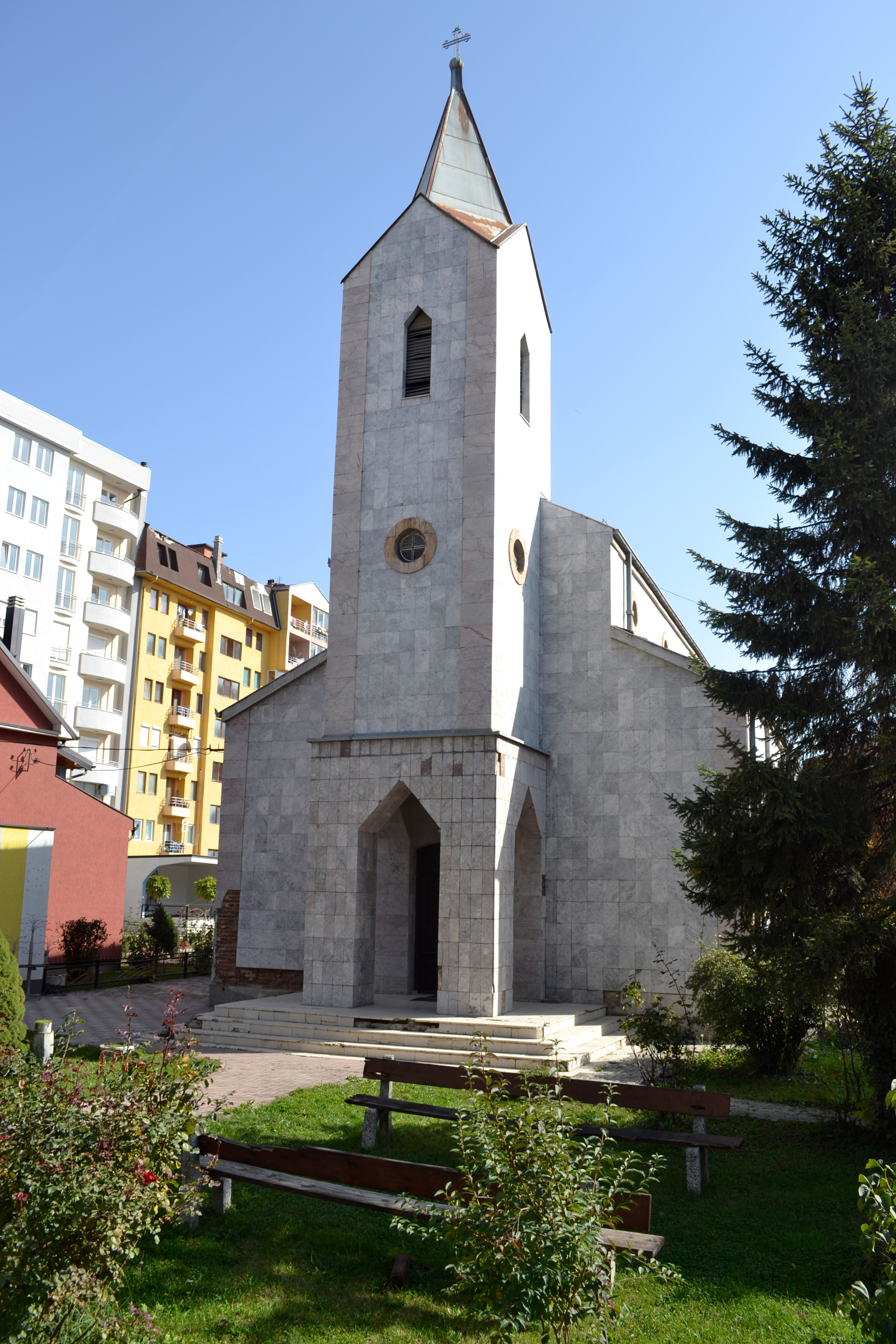
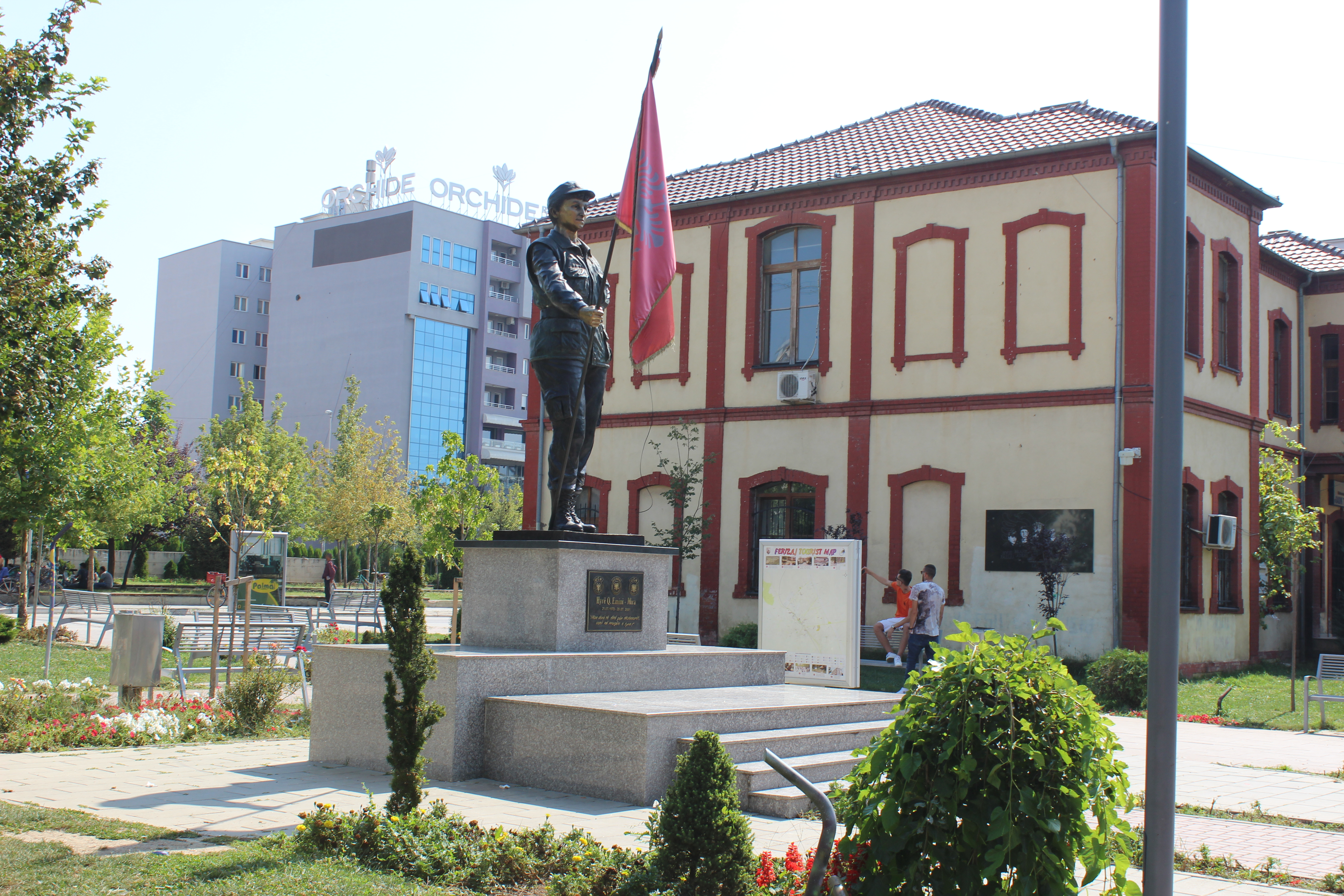
- "Mulla Vesel Guta" Mosque and St. Uroš Cathedral Ferizaj's Theatre "Adriana" "Anton Çetta" City Archive Catholic Church "Engjëlli i Rojës" "Sadik Tafarshiku" City Library

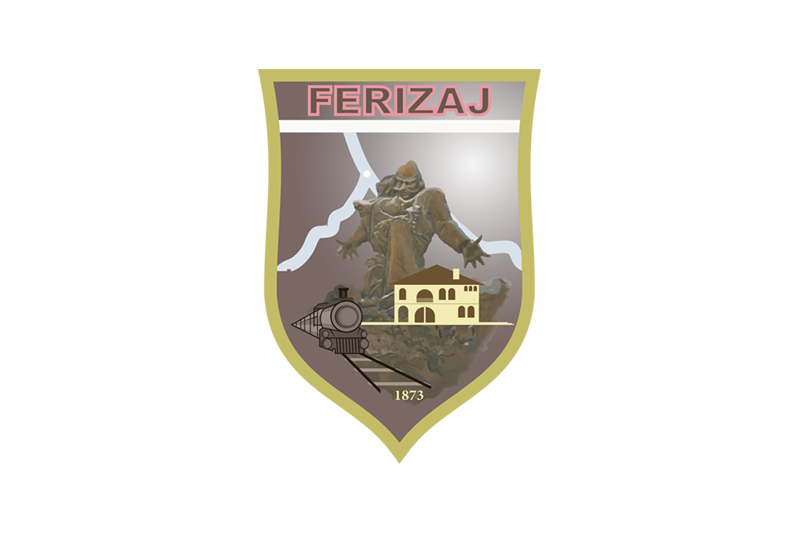
- Flag Seal
- Nicknames: City of Murals
- Interactive map of Ferizaj
- Location within Kosovo
- Coordinates: 42°22′N 21°10′E
- Country: Kosovo
- District: Ferizaj
- Settled: 1873
- Named for: Feriz Shasivari

Government
  - Type: Mayor–council
  - Mayor: Agim Aliu (PDK)
  - Council: Ferizaj Municipal Council

Area
  - Municipality: 344.61 km^{2} (133.05 sq mi)
  - Rank: 14th in Kosovo
- Elevation: 580 m (1,900 ft)

Population (2024)
  - Municipality: 109,345
  - Rank: 3rd in Kosovo
  - Density: 317.30/km^{2} (821.81/sq mi)
  - Urban: 52,392
  - Ethnicity: 96.13% Albanian; 3.87% Other
- Demonym(s): Standard Albanian: Ferizajas (m); Ferizajase (f); Gheg dialect: Ferizajli (m); Ferizajlike (f)
- Time zone: UTC+1 (CET)
  - Summer (DST): UTC+2 (CEST)
- Postal code: 70000
- Country code: +383
- Vehicle registration: 05
- Website: ferizaj.rks-gov.net

Ferizaj, or Uroševac, (Note: Albanian definite form: Ferizaji, pronounced [fɛɾiˈzaji] or Uroševac Serbian Cyrillic: Урошевац, pronounced [uroˈʃeʋats]. Also formerly known as Ferizovići (Turkish: Firzovik).) is a city and a municipality in Kosovo. It is the third largest city in Kosovo by population and also the seat of Ferizaj Municipality and the Ferizaj District. According to the last census of 2024, the municipality of Ferizaj has 109,255 inhabitants.

Ferizaj has been populated since the prehistoric era by the Starčevo, Vinča and Baden culture. During the Ottoman period, Ferizaj served as a trading centre on the route between Belgrade and Thessaloniki. Ferizaj has always been considered as a city where tolerance and coexistence in terms of religion and culture has been part of the society in the last centuries. During and after the Kosovo War in 1999, the US Army base Camp Bondsteel was established outside of the city, now being used by forces belonging to KFOR. It is the largest and the most expensive foreign military base built by the Americans in South Eastern Europe, since the Vietnam War.

Ferizaj is located in the south-eastern part of Kosovo, about halfway between the cities of Pristina and Skopje. It is some 230 kilometres north-east of Tirana, 55 kilometres north of Skopje, 300 kilometres west of Sofia, 35 kilometres south of Pristina and 300 kilometres east of Podgorica. Ferizaj is also known for a geographic phenomenon known as river bifurcation. The Nerodime river is divided into two branches and both flow into two different seas. This phenomenon is exclusively seen in nature in this example, and that of the river Casiquiare, Brazil.

Since 2016, the MuralFest festival has been organised annually by the organisation with the same name, MuralFest Kosova. Painting murals in public spaces, the festival eventually spread to other cities in Kosovo. The festival has been attracting the attention of international media since the 2025 edition, it is attended by famous mural artists around the world.

== Etymology ==
Ferizaj was named after a governor in Ottoman times (along with the typical Albanian -aj suffix), who had a station built on the Mitrovica-Skopje railway on his estate: Ferizaj in Albanian and Ferizović in Serbian. In 1914, after Serbian annexation, Ferizović was subsequently changed to Uroševac in reference to the last Serbian Tsar, Stefan Uroš V, while its Albanian name remained unchanged.

== History ==
=== Early development ===
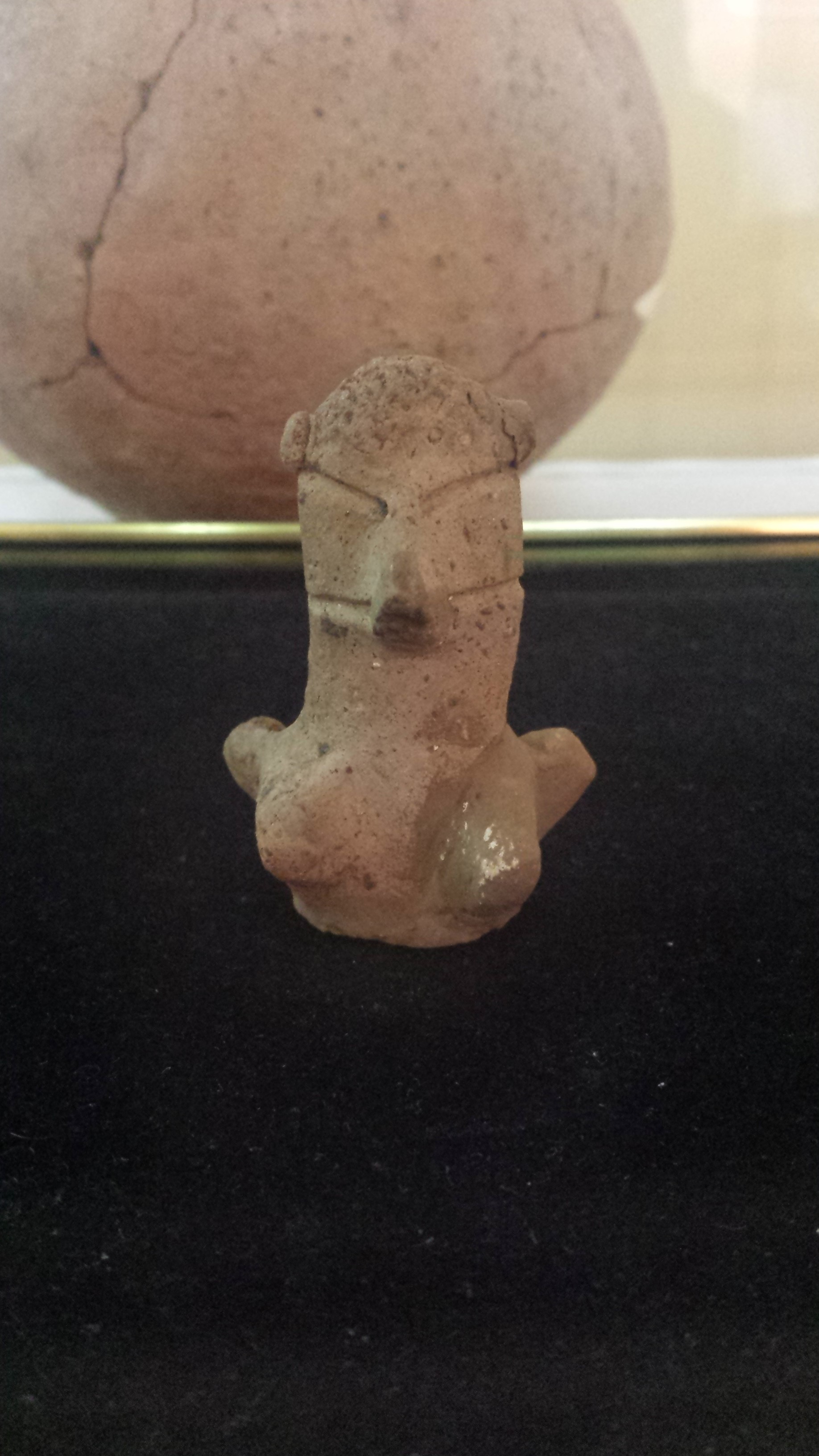
Goddess of Varosh

The most ancient group of people that inhabited the territory of Kosovo, in the 6th and 5th millenniums BC was the Starčevo culture. Members of this group built homes near rivers and river terraces. They made their homes of willows and mud, while their main profession was plowing and farming.

In the next archaeological period, the Vinča culture developed in some parts of Kosovo. These population shifts were made around 4300 BC. The newcomers also built their habitats near rivers. These habitats were unfortified, with dense rows of willows and mud houses. Remnants of their material culture, mostly different forms of ceramic vessels and large numbers of baked clay figures, testify on a higher cultural level.

Following the previously mentioned, Starčevo and Vinča, the Bubanj-Hum culture arrived in Kosovo. This cultural group expanded from the east, from the territory of today's Bulgaria. When carriers of this ethno-cultural group reached the region before the end of the 6th millennium BC, they destroyed Vinča habitats. Remnants of their material culture have not survived.

After Bubanj-Hum, the Baden culture arrived from the Danube, representing its southernmost influence in Kosovo. Baden culture ended before the end of the 3rd millennium BC.

Starting from the 8th century BC and then during the next centuries, until the Roman conquest, can transmit continuously development of a new culture in the region, the Dardanian tribe. The Dardanian burned their dead and bury their remnants in tumuli tombs. In the city, two necropoleis have been found, one in the locality of Kuline near the railway station in Gërlicë, the other in region of Mollopolc, along the Ferizaj-Shtime road.

Around 280 BC some episodes from the life of Dardania reaches historical records as a political community ruled by a king.

Most of the information on the Dardanians is about their wars against the Macedons. The first contact between the Dardania and the Romans came in 200 BC when they offered military assistance in the fight against Macedonia. In 96 BC the Roman Emperor Sulla subdued the Dardani. Numerous Roman settlements were established across the valley, on the old lake terraces. These settlements also accompanied a road network; connecting cities such as Ulpiana and Skopje, which was part of the important road connecting Macedonia to Dalmatia, passing across Ferizaj and the gorge of Kaçanik. A part of the road was discovered on the river bed of the Lepenac, one near the village of Doganaj, the other near the village of Reka.

=== Medieval period ===
In the late 13th century, Serbian king Stefan Milutin built two medieval fortresses (Veliki Petrič and Mali Petrič) to protect his court in Nerodimlje, located west of present-day Ferizaj.

=== Ottoman period ===
The town, named Ferızovık when it was part of the Ottoman Empire, was little more than a village until 1873 when the Mitrovica–Skopje railway station was built in the area.

During the Ottoman–Habsburg wars of the late 17th century and the first half of the 18th century, major ethnic changes occurred and the rapid Islamisation from Ottoman Empire began. The city became home to different inns, warehouses, and permanent markets. In addition to the name established by the Ottoman authorities, the town was also called "Tasjon" by surrounding villagers; dervied from the French word station.

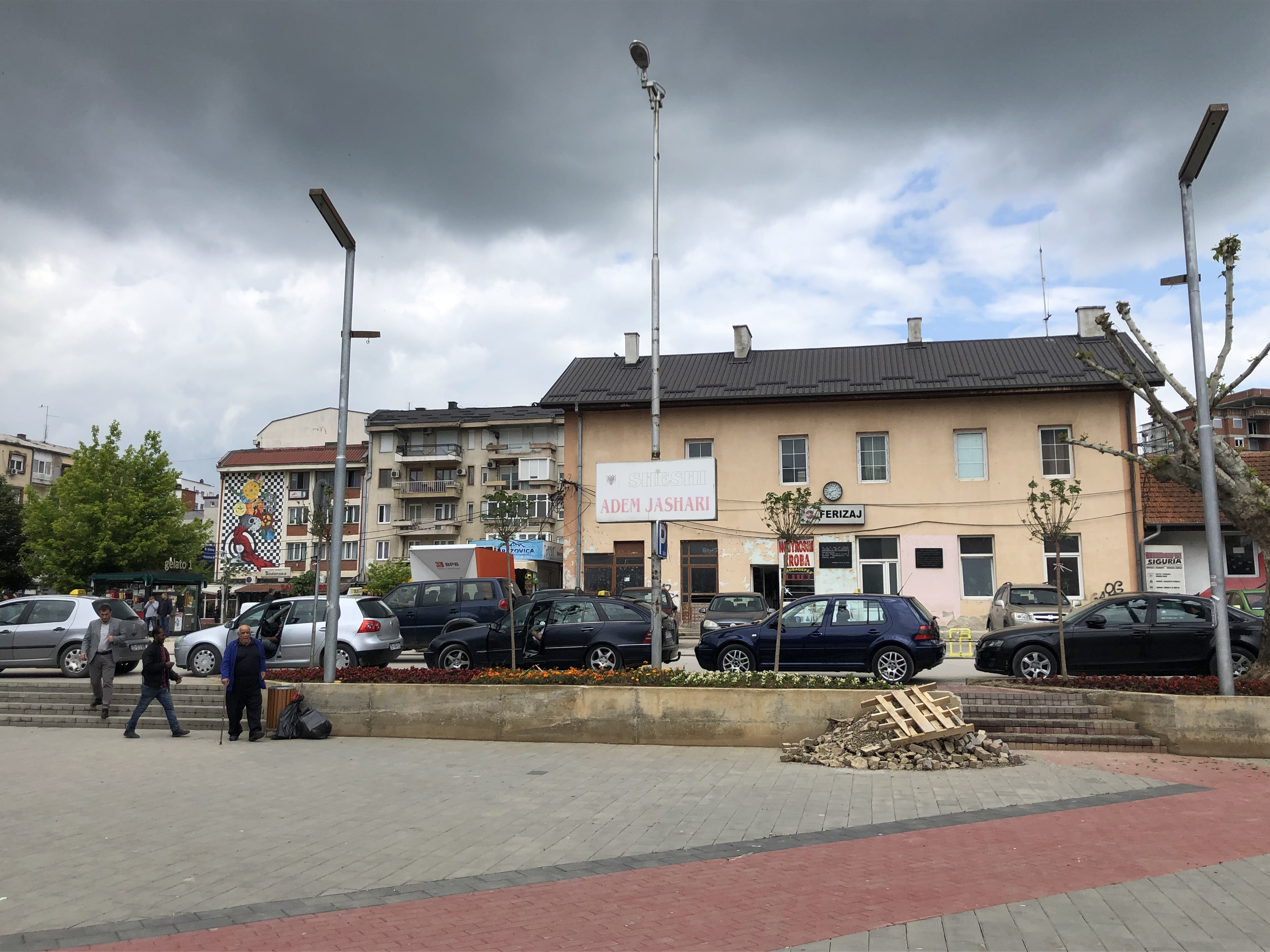
Ferizaj train station

Traders of Kosovo from Prizren to Shkodër, which at that time was by caravan, were mainly diverted towards Thessaloniki. Exporting raw materials especially that of cereals went through Ferizaj and through aligned foreign goods turnover came from Thessaloniki and Skopje. During this period, the opening of the colonial shops, craft workshops accelerated the development of the city. Most of the population worked in crafts and other activities related to trade. By 1900, Ferizaj became a city with about 400 houses and 200 shops.

=== Balkan Wars ===
When the settlement fell to Serbia during the First Balkan War, the local Albanian population offered determined resistance. According to certain reports, fighting lasted for three days. The Serbian commander then ordered the population to surrender. When the survivors returned, 300–400 men were executed and according to the Catholic Archbishop of Skopje, Lazër Mjeda, only three Muslim Albanians over the age of fifteen were left alive. The destruction of Albanian-populated villages around Ferizovik followed. The massacre of the Albanian population following the entry of the Serbian army was described by Leo Freundlich who recorded contemporary reports in Albania's Golgotha. According to the war correspondent from Rome's Il Messaggero, the town was destroyed and most of its inhabitants were killed. Freundlich estimated the total number of deaths to be 1,200. Numerous reports from the Balkan Wars including the series of articles from then journalist Leon Trotsky recorded state-organised massacres in numerous locations including Ferizaj, Gjakova, Gjilan, Pristina and Prizren with the total number of deaths at around 25,000.

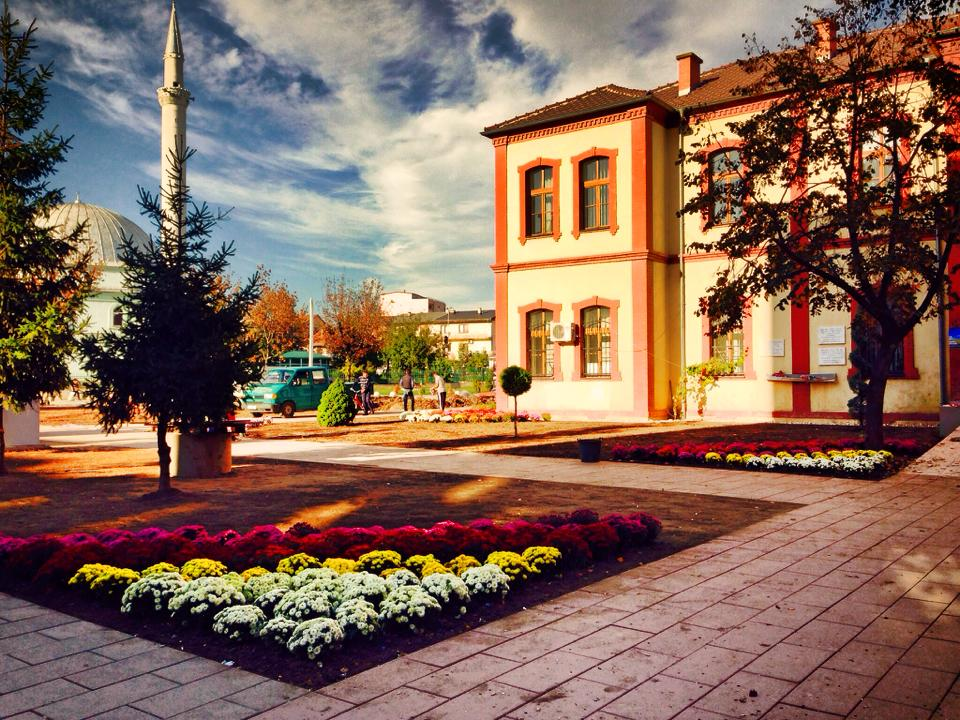
City Library

The Treaty of London in 1913 turned Ferizovik into a part of the Kingdom of Serbia, and the name was changed to Uroševac, after Stefan Uroš V of Serbia. This was part of the Serbianisation efforts of the early twentieth century in which inhabited places within Kosovo were named after heroes from Serbian epic poetry.

=== World War I ===
The beginning of the First World War partly began with Serbia and Montenegro, and because both were involved directly from the beginning of the war, Kosovo was plagued with fighting. In October 1915, Bulgaria entered the war as an ally of the German Empire, and conducted military operations in the Ferizaj area that were part of the main artery connecting Kumanovo and Skopje with Kosovo. The city had served as a stopping point during the Bulgarian penetration of the Kaçanik Gorge. The Serbian resistance ended on 25 November 1915, when it was vanquished by the Bulgarian Army. This was facilitated by Albanians in hopes that the situation would change and the area would be freed. On 1 April 1916, Ferizaj was left to Bulgaria as a station key, but the usage of the railway was also granted to the Austro–Hungarian Empire as the line: Prizren – Ferizaj – Albania.

=== World War II ===
The early months of the World War II had a positive impact on the residents of Ferizaj for not realising the Convention of 1938, which was signed between Yugoslavia and Turkey for the resettlement of Albanians in Turkey, and that included the massive resettlement of the residents of the District of Nerodime. Under this convention, this migration was to be imposed in the period of 1939 until 1944. The attack led by Italy to Albania that it had not been realised. Under the invasion of Albanian territory by Italians and Germans, the Italian troops were deployed in Ferizaj, due to an auxiliary army airport of the Kingdom of Serbia being discovered, which served Italian military aircraft.

In 1941, the Communist Party's leading bodies of Ferizaj implored more residents to join the National Liberation Movement. By the end of this year, previously established groups of illegal arms were conducting business in the city. With the capitulation of Italy, the country was occupied by Germany, and the behavior of the German occupation was more favorable to the Albanian population than that of the Italians. On 11–12 September 1943, 60 Serbs were killed by Ballists in the area of Ferizaj. The excuse given for the massacre was that a communist activist wounded 2 Albanian gendarme. After the German invasion, the National Liberation Movement was strengthened even further until 1943 when the arrest and deportation of all participants began. This movement eventually resulted in the liberation of the city on 2 December 1944, and later, in the liberation of the country. After the liberation of Ferizaj, two tasks stood afront the National Liberation Movement: release and protect territory, and rebuild the economy of the country.

=== Kosovo War ===
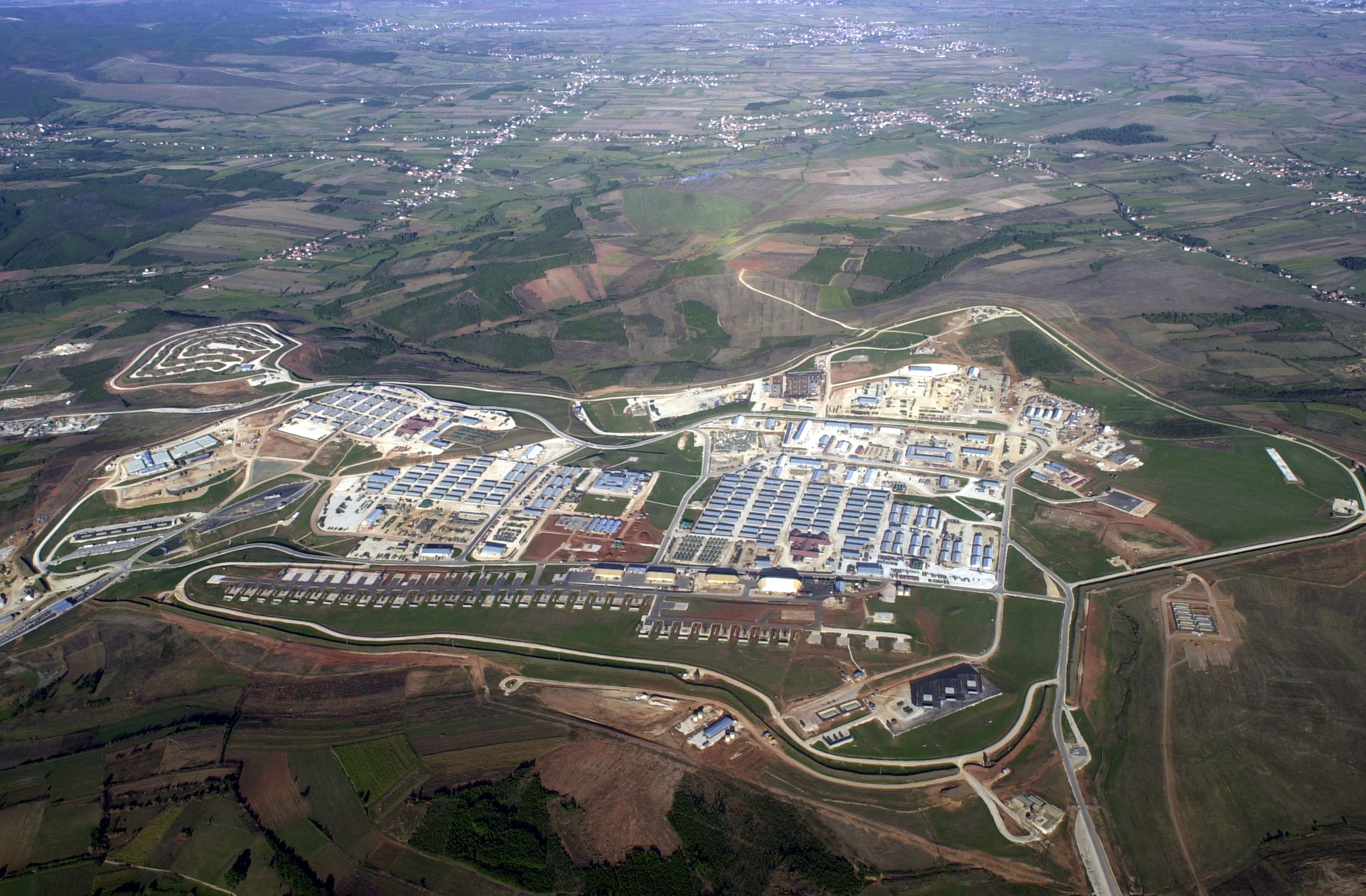
Camp Bondsteel from above in Ferizaj

Later, the city suffered some damages during the 1999 Kosovo War, with some of its Albanian-populated neighbourhoods being shelled and burned by the Yugoslav Army. Following the war, the city has seen serious inter-communal unrest, which has resulted in almost all of the Serbians, and other non-Albanian inhabitants, either being expelled or forced to flee. The Serbian churches of St. Nicholas and St. Stephen were destroyed in 1999 in an act of rebellion.

Camp Bondsteel, the main base of the United States Army detachment to the KFOR peacekeeping force in Kosovo, is located nearby. The camp was established immediately after the war. The camp is one of the largest in the area, being formed by 955 acres or 360,000 square meters. Bondsteel is located on hills and farmland near the city of Ferizaj.

== Geography ==
=== Climate ===
Ferizaj has a humid subtropical climate (Cfa) as of the Köppen climate classification with an average annual temperature of 11.7 °C (53.1 °F). The warmest month in Ferizaj is August with an average temperature of 23.2 °C (73.8 °F), while the coldest month is January with an average temperature of 0.1 °C (32.2 °F).

Climate data for Ferizaj
Month	Jan	Feb	Mar	Apr	May	Jun	Jul	Aug	Sep	Oct	Nov	Dec	Year
Mean daily maximum °C (°F)	4.1 (39.4)	6.4 (43.5)	11.4 (52.5)	16.7 (62.1)	21.2 (70.2)	25.5 (77.9)	28.2 (82.8)	28.7 (83.7)	23 (73)	17.2 (63.0)	11.1 (52.0)	5.1 (41.2)	16.5 (61.8)
Mean daily minimum °C (°F)	−3.2 (26.2)	−1.7 (28.9)	1.7 (35.1)	6.2 (43.2)	11 (52)	15.1 (59.2)	17.5 (63.5)	17.8 (64.0)	13.2 (55.8)	8.1 (46.6)	3.1 (37.6)	−1.5 (29.3)	7.3 (45.1)
Average precipitation mm (inches)	56 (2.2)	58 (2.3)	76 (3.0)	90 (3.5)	103 (4.1)	80 (3.1)	64 (2.5)	49 (1.9)	57 (2.2)	60 (2.4)	65 (2.6)	74 (2.9)	832 (32.7)
Average relative humidity (%)	79	75	71	67	68	64	57	55	64	73	78	80	69
Source: Climate-Data

== Demographics ==
Population history of Ferizaj Municipality in selected periods
Year	1948	1961	1981	1994	1997	2011	2024
Pop.	30,596	41,881	83,945	121,300	127,900	108,610	109,345
±% p.a.	—	+2.44%	+3.54%	+2.87%	+1.78%	−1.16%	+0.05%

According to the OSCE census OF 2018, there were 108,610 residents in Ferizaj Municipality, constituting the sixth most populous municipality of Kosovo. Its urban population amounted to about 42,500, while the rural population was around 65,900. With a population density of 314.8 people per square kilometer, Ferizaj is among the most densely populated municipalities of Kosovo. In the 1990s, the city of Ferizaj had a population of about 70,000 people but it has grown substantially due to Albanian migration from the countryside and from parts of southern Serbia.

By ethnicity, Albanians form the largest ethnic group in Ferizaj Municipality at 104,152, followed by Ashkalis (3,629 inhabitants) and Romanis (204 inhabitants). Other ethnicities include Bosniaks, Egyptians, Gorani, Serbs and Turks. By language, 107,926 spoke Albanian as a first language. Other spoken languages were Bosnian, Serbian and Turkish. By religion, there were 107,121 Muslim, 413 Roman Catholics, 45 Orthodox, 64 of other religions and 41 irreligious.

== Culture ==
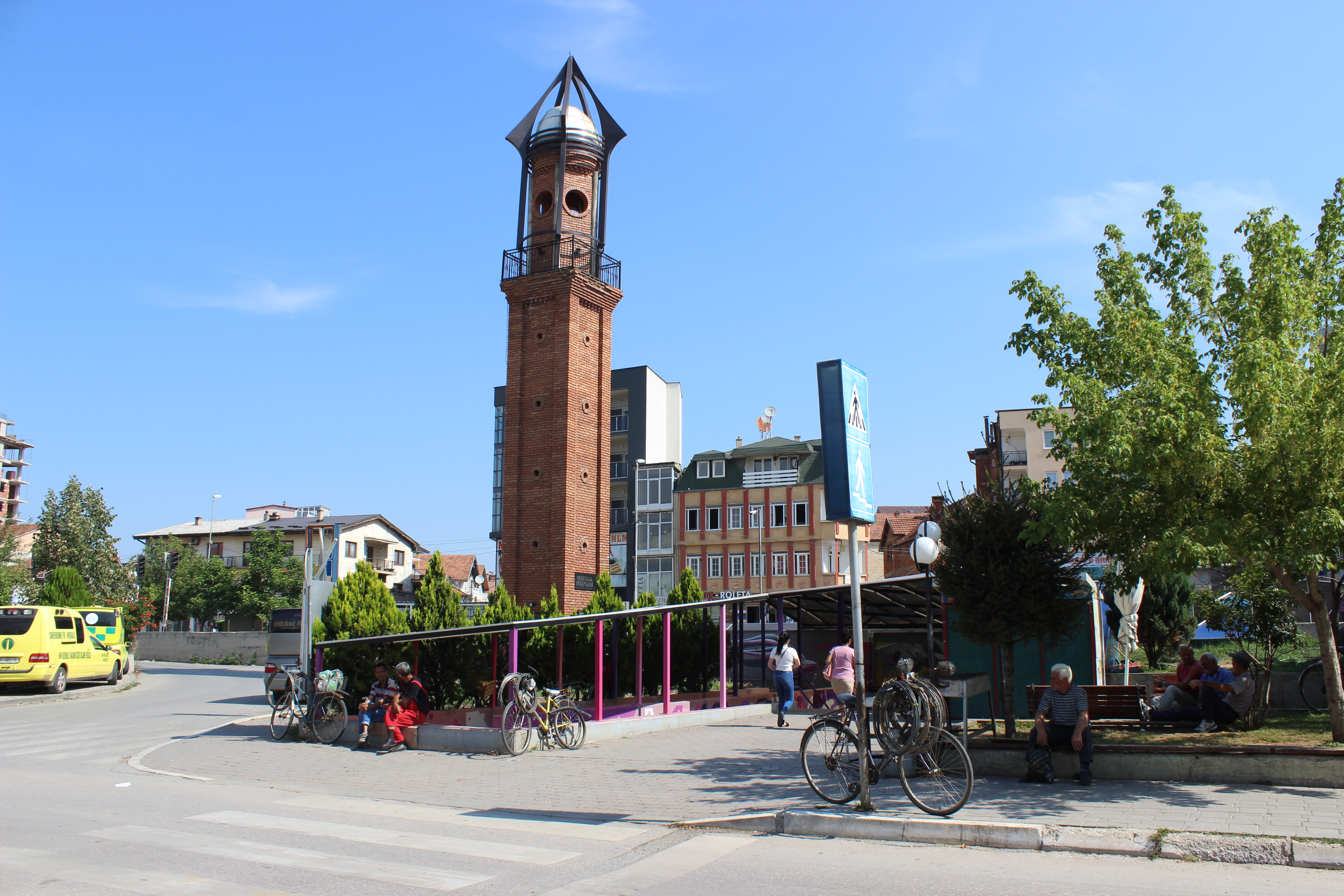
Ferizaj's Clock Tower, now destroyed

The Big Mosque of Mulla Veseli, built in 1891, and the St. Uroš Orthodox Cathedral in the centre of Ferizaj are considered symbolic of religious tolerance between Muslim Albanians and Christian Serbs. Because the mosque and the church are next to one another, they are popular tourist destinations. The mosque was destroyed during World War II, but then rebuilt after the war. During the Kosovo War in 1999, neither were destroyed, however, in March 2004 during a period of unrest in Kosovo, the church was attacked.

The composer Lorenc Antoni lived in Ferizaj in the early 1940s, and the composer Venqenc Gjini from Ferizaj have also made notable contributions to culture and are respected throughout Kosovo, especially for their creative idioms inspired by the central fountain in front of the mosque.

Ferizaj is also famous for its Ensemble of Song and Dance "Kastriotët", which was created in 1967.

It also yearly hosts MuralFest, a festival of murals hosted every June in Ferizaj, where artists from around the world who specialise in the art of murals, come and show their talent by transforming public spaces into lively areas of the city, thus earning the name city of murals over the years, the festival also does mural art in other cities in Kosovo too, like Pristina, Gjilan, Gjakova, Vitia, Kaçanik and Pallagorio of the Calabria region in Italy.

Panorama of Ferizaj

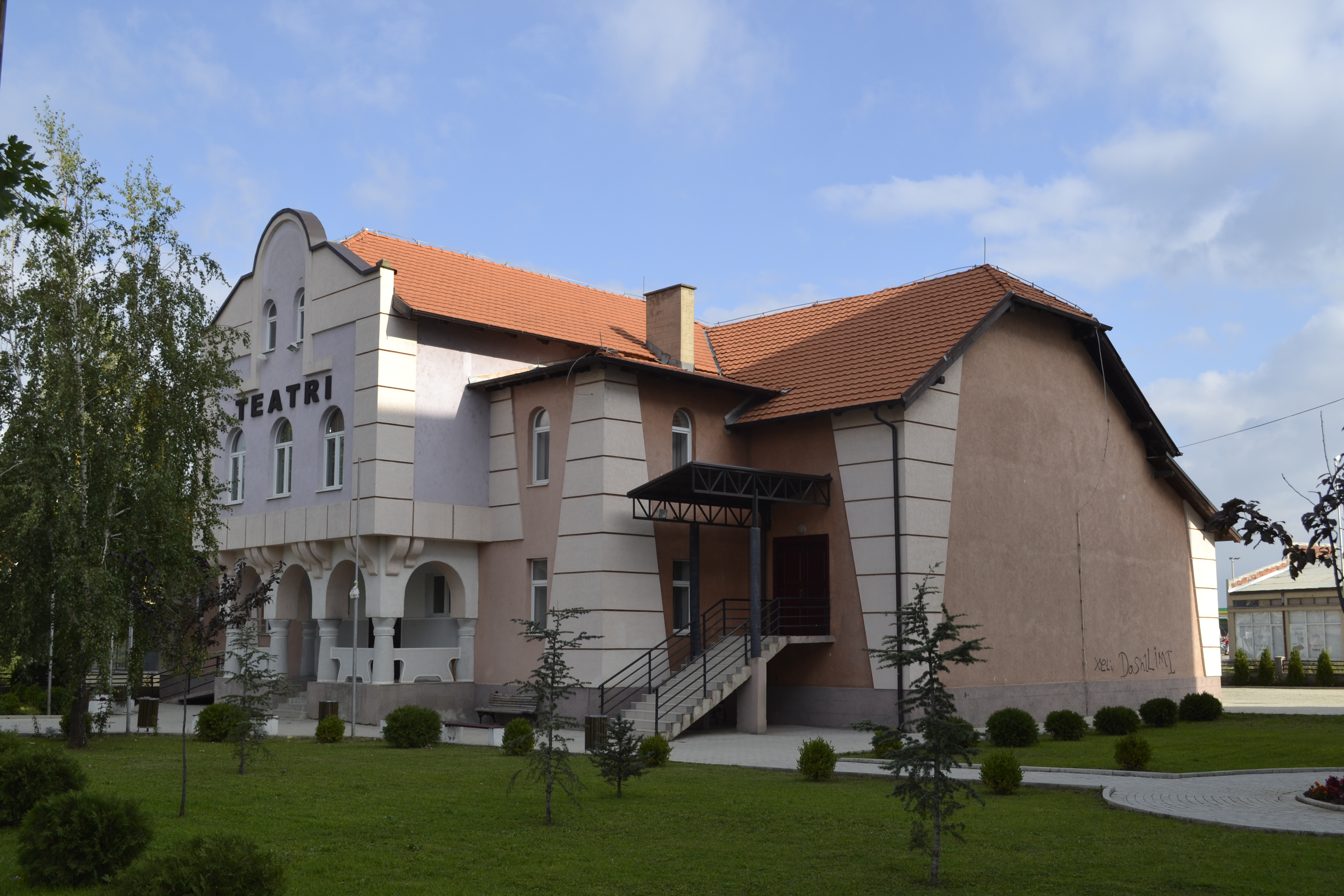
Teatri "Adriana" Theatre in Ferizaj

=== Education ===
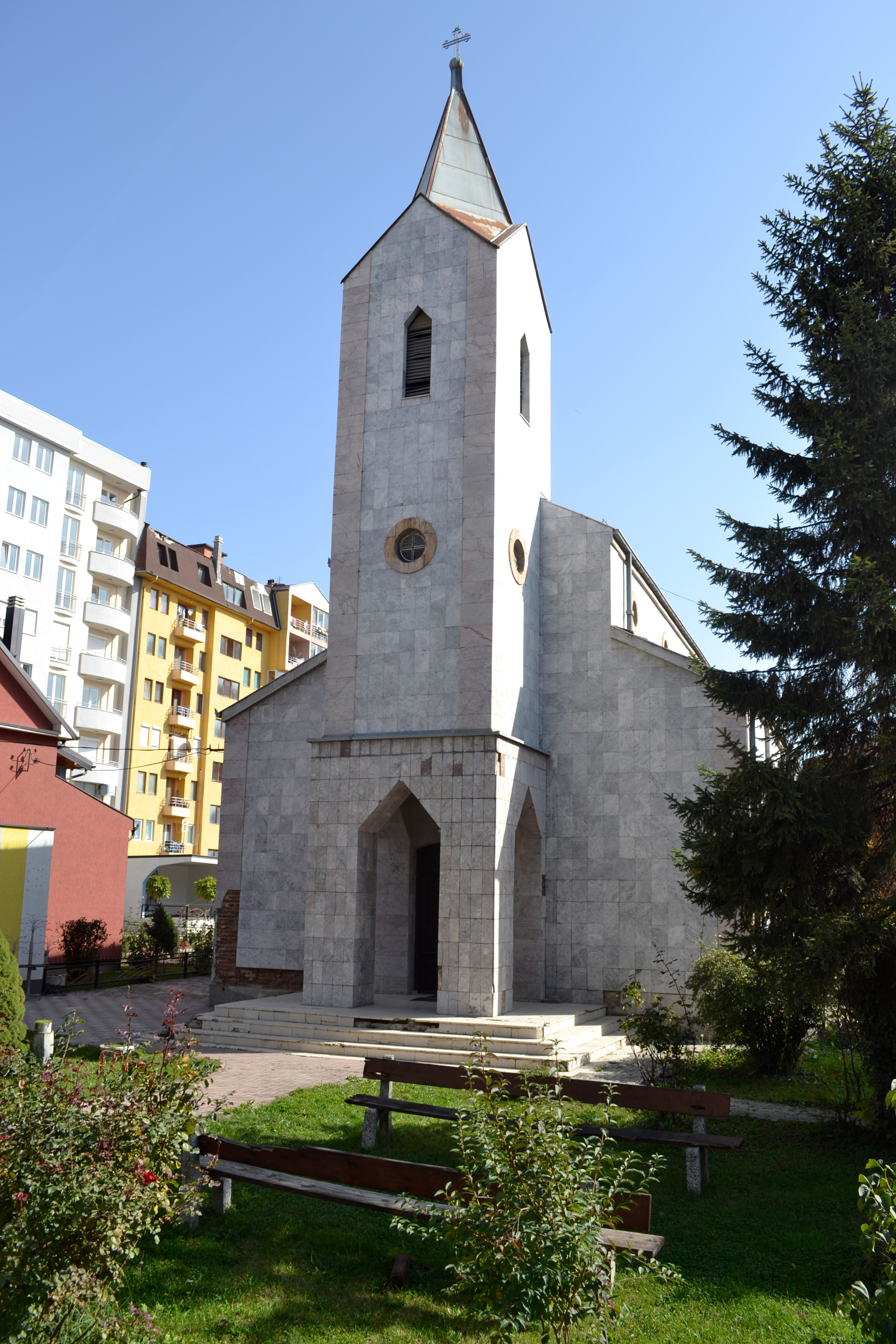
Kisha Katolike „Engjelli i Rojës“

There are 39 primary schools in the municipality and 20,492 students. Eight secondary schools include gymnasium and professional schools (technical, medical, music, agricultural and economics) with 6,127 students in total. The school attendance of the Ashkali, Roma and Gorani children is lower than the Kosovo Albanians. There is also one kindergarten with a total of 270 children registered. The Municipal Department of Education and Science has more than 1,680 professional and support staff, including 10 minority communities representatives.

The city has one public university known as University of Applied Sciences in Ferizaj and one public library, where students also have internet access. Membership prices apply.

=== Sport ===
Ferizaj is home to FC Ferizaj, KF Dinamo in football and KH Kastrioti in handball.

=== Archaeology ===
A church foundation was unearthed in the Nikadin village, believed to date back to the 5th or 6th centuries. There are remnants of bricks and tiling from the Roman era, and, most notably, a sarcophagus which was identified below the floor.

A Neolithic site is located 2 km from Ferizaj, in the Varosh village. It includes ceramic fragments, the majority of which belonged to the Starčevo and Vinča cultures. It is believed that the site was a settlement in the Roman era. In 2008, another Neolithic site was discovered in the Zllatar village. There are indications it was used in the Mesolithic age, as well as more recent periods. It displays flint, stone tools, and ceramics.

Ruins of a Roman-era church were discovered at Komogllava. It is believed to have been built in the 1st century BC, then rebuilt in the Byzantine era. The locality includes remnants of ancient urbanised streets, sewage, and other infrastructure. Vases, ceramic pots, coins, jewellery, items of iron and other carbonaceous substances, but also characteristic stone, believed to have been moved from coastal areas to build the sarcophagus and other items.

== Sister cities ==
Ferizaj's sister cities are:

- (United States) Cedar Falls, Iowa (2023)

== See also ==
- Economy of Ferizaj
