= Marjan Dema =

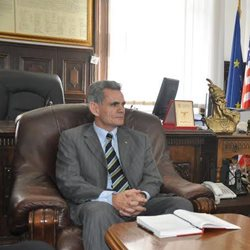
Marjan Dema, 2016

Marjan Dema (born May 27, 1957, in Klina, FPR Yugoslavia) is a professor of mathematics. He was involved for many years in the Balkan Universities Network and from March 2016 until September 2020 he was Rector of the University of Pristina.

== Biography ==
Marjan Dema earned a master's degree in mathematics with the thesis "Some interpolation features of analytical functions within the Hilbert transform and Doctor of Mathematical Sciences in 1987 with the work Multiple interpolation in HP premises, at the University of Pristina.

He has taught as visiting professor at the Faculty of Economics of the University of Tetova (1997-1999) and at the American College "Midwestern Baptist College" in Pontiac, United States (2002-2005). He has scientific connections within the framework of the Balkan Universities Network to the Trakya University in Edirne and especially with Hilmi Ibar.

In the years 2009-2012 he was a member of the University Council of the University of Pristina. After his election as Rector of the University of Pristina, he took office in March 2016.

In 2019, Rector Dema was the patron of an international seminar hosted by Rotary International with students from Germany, Greece, Turkey and Kosovo on the subject of malaria control.

== Literature ==
- Marjan Dema opening speech in: Manfred G. Raupp und Wolfgang Uebel: The fight against Malaria and other related mosquito-born Diseases, Results and proposed next Steps of the Rotary Seminar at the University Prishtina (Kosovo) 2019: Publisher: madora gmbh Lörrach & Lörrach International e.V. Mai 2019, ISBN 978-3-945046-16-6
