= Sahithi Varshini Moogi =

Indian chess player (born 2007)

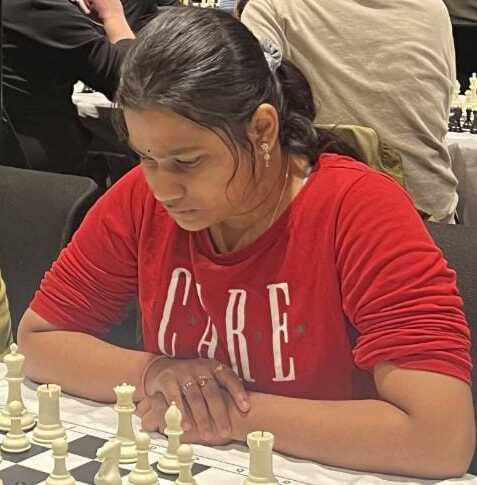
- Sahithi Varshini Moogi in 2023 in Reykjavik open blitz tournament Iceland

Personal information
- Born: 27 April 2007 (age 19) Vishakhapatnam, Andhra Pradesh, India

Chess career
- Country: India
- Title: FIDE Master (2023); Woman International Master (2022)
- FIDE rating: 2266 (July 2025)
- Peak rating: 2312 (April 2022)

Sahithi Varshini Moogi (born 27 April 2007) is an Indian chess player who holds the FIDE titles of Fide Master (FM) 2023, Woman International Master (WIM) 2022, Woman FIDE Master (WFM) 2019, and Woman Candidate Master (WCM) 2017.

Sahithi represented the Indian chess team in the 44th Chess Olympiad, 2022. Sahithi won the Magnus Chess Challenge best female player in 2022 and secured the second position in the best female category in the Biel Grandmasters tournament in Switzerland 2022.

== Career ==
- Gold Medal in U10 girls commonwealth Chess championship
- Gold Medal in Asian Youth U12 girls at Thailand in individual Classical
- Gold Medal in Asian Youth U12 girls at Thailand in individual Rapid championship
- Bronze medal in Asian Youth U12 girls at Thailand in individual Blitz championship
- Gold Medal in Asian Youth U10 Girls at Uzbekistan in 2017 in individual classical
- Gold Medal in Asian Youth U10 girls at Uzbekistan in 2017 in individual blitz
