= Faculty of Philosophy of the University of Pristina =

Faculty of the University of Pristina

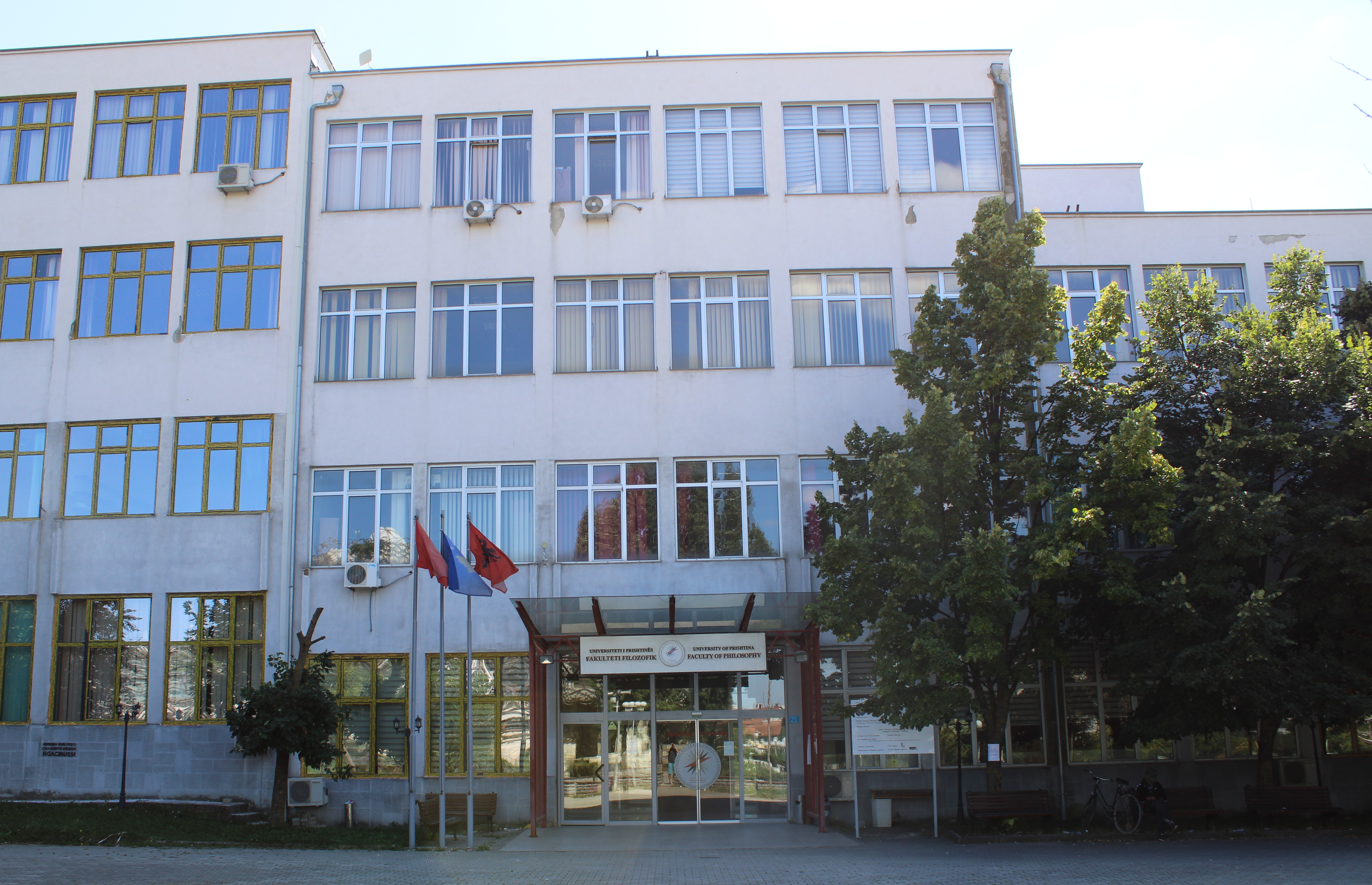
Entrance to the faculty

The Faculty of Philosophy is the first faculty in Kosovo, established on October 30, 1960, a decade before the founding of the University of Pristina itself.

== Organisation ==
The Faculty of Philosophy is organized into seven departments, which are:

- Department of History
- Department of Sociology
- Department of Philosophy
- Department of Psychology
- Department of Social Work
- Department of Anthropology
- Department of Political Science

== Notable faculty ==
- Idriz Ajeti
- Zef Mirdita
- Edi Shukriu
- Fehmi Agani
- Pajazit Nushi
- Skënder Rizaj
- Islam Krasniqi
- Hajrullah Koliqi
- Jashar Rexhepagiq
- Afërdita Deva-Zuna
- Aleksandar Stipčević

== See also ==
- Education in Kosovo
- List of universities in Kosovo
