= Koliqi =

Koliqi is a surname. Notable people with the surname include:

- Ernest Koliqi (1903–1975), Albanian journalist, politician, translator, teacher and writer
- Hajrullah Koliqi (born 1946), Albanian educator, lecturer and university professor
- Mikel Koliqi (1902–1997), Albanian Catholic cardinal
