= Higher Pedagogical School of Pristina =

Former high school in Pristina, Kosovo

The Higher Pedagogical School of Pristina established in 1958, has been the first institution of modern higher education in Kosovo and a precursor to the University of Pristina.

== History ==
While its roots can be traced back to the Normal School of Pristina, the Higher Pedagogical School in Pristina was initially established in 1958 as the first institution of higher education in Kosovo. It had a notable impact on the advancement of education and culture during a time of heightened self-governance for Kosovo within Yugoslavia. The institution was originally situated in a repurposed facility that had previously served as a teacher training college (Prishtina Normal School). It was established by authorities from Kosovo and Yugoslavia as a response to address Albanian aspirations for increased educational access. The educational program of the institution mirrored the structure of other universities within Yugoslavia. The inaugural group of students, comprising 120 individuals of Albanian descent, commenced their academic journey.

== See also ==
- Education in Kosovo
- List of universities in Kosovo
- Faculty of Philosophy of the University of Pristina
