= Islam Krasniqi =

Kosovan educational theorist and pedagogue

Islam Krasniqi (1942, Negroc, Drenas) is a Kosovan didactician, educational theorist, and university professor.

== Biography ==
Krasniqi was born in the village of Negroc near Drenas in 1942. Primary education began in his hometown, after which he completed the Prishtina Normal School. He continued his studies at the Faculty of Philosophy at the University of Pristina, while he obtained his master's degree at the Faculty of Philosophy, University of Zagreb in Croatia and his doctorate in 1985 at the Faculty of Philosophy of the University of Prishtina. Initially, he was a teacher in Arllat of Drenas, later teaching pedagogical subjects at the Normal Schools of Ferizaj and Pristina, at "Sami Frashëri" high school, and at the music high school in Pristina, as well as at "Skënderbeu" high school in Drenas. In 1972, he was accepted as an assistant at the Department of Pedagogy at the Faculty of Philosophy in Pristina. Until the end of his career, he taught in this department, but was also involved in the Pedagogical-Linguistic Section of Gjakova and Gjilan, in several faculties of the University of Pristina, at the University of Skopje and University of Tetovo, and ended up at the Fama College in Pristina. Meanwhile, he performed professional duties with responsibility. He was the head of the pedagogy department, dean of the Faculty of Philosophy, member of the State Council for the Development of Pre-University Curricula of Kosovo, etc. He dealt with Albanian pedagogical methodology, didactics, and bibliography. He participated in conferences and scientific symposiums for study purposes, he stayed in various countries. He is the author or co-author of school and university texts. In various magazines and newspapers, he published dozens of works and also published several scientific-professional works.

== Selected publications ==
- "Mësimi i leximit dhe i shkrimit fillestar" (Teaching Reading and Writing at the Primary Level), 2002,
- "Metodikë e mësimit të dituri natyrës e shoqërisë" (Methodology of Teaching Natural and Social Sciences), 2002,
- "Bibliografi e punimeve pedagogjike të botuara në periodikun pedagogjik në gjuhën shqipe midis viteve 1945-1978"
  (Bibliography of Pedagogical Works Published in the Pedagogical Periodical in Albanian between 1945-1978), 2004,
- "Mendimi metodik dhe praktika shkollore e mësimdhënies..." (Methodical Thought and School Teaching Practice...) 2004,
- "Abetare" (Alphabet book), 2008, (coauthor) OCLC 732318230
- "Një gurrë përherë e freskët e mendimit didaktik në gjuhën shqipe..." (A perpetually fresh pot of didactic thought in the Albanian language...), 2008, OCLC 892098550
- "Një shkollë pa dhunë" (A school without violence), 2012, (coauthor)
- "Abetare për klasën e parë të arsimit fillor" (Primary school primer for first grade), 2021 OCLC 1374830732
- "Për shkollën dhe mësimin shqip" (For Albanian Schooling and Teaching), 2022,

== See also ==
- University of Prishtina
