= Radivoje =

Given name

Radivoje (Cyrillic script: Радивоје) is a masculine given name of Slavic origin. Notable people with the name include:

- Radivoje Brajović (born 1935), President of Montenegro 1986–1988
- Radivoje Golubović (born 1990), footballer
- Radivoje Janković (1889–1949), general of the Kingdom of Yugoslavia
- Radivoje Manić (born 1972), Serbian football player who has played at forward
- Radivoje Ognjanović (born 1938), former Yugoslavian football player and manager
- Radivoje Papović, Rector of the University of Pristina, Kosovoin 1991–1998 and 2004–2006

== See also ==
- Radivojević
