= Lulzim Tafa =

Poet and academic (b. 1970)

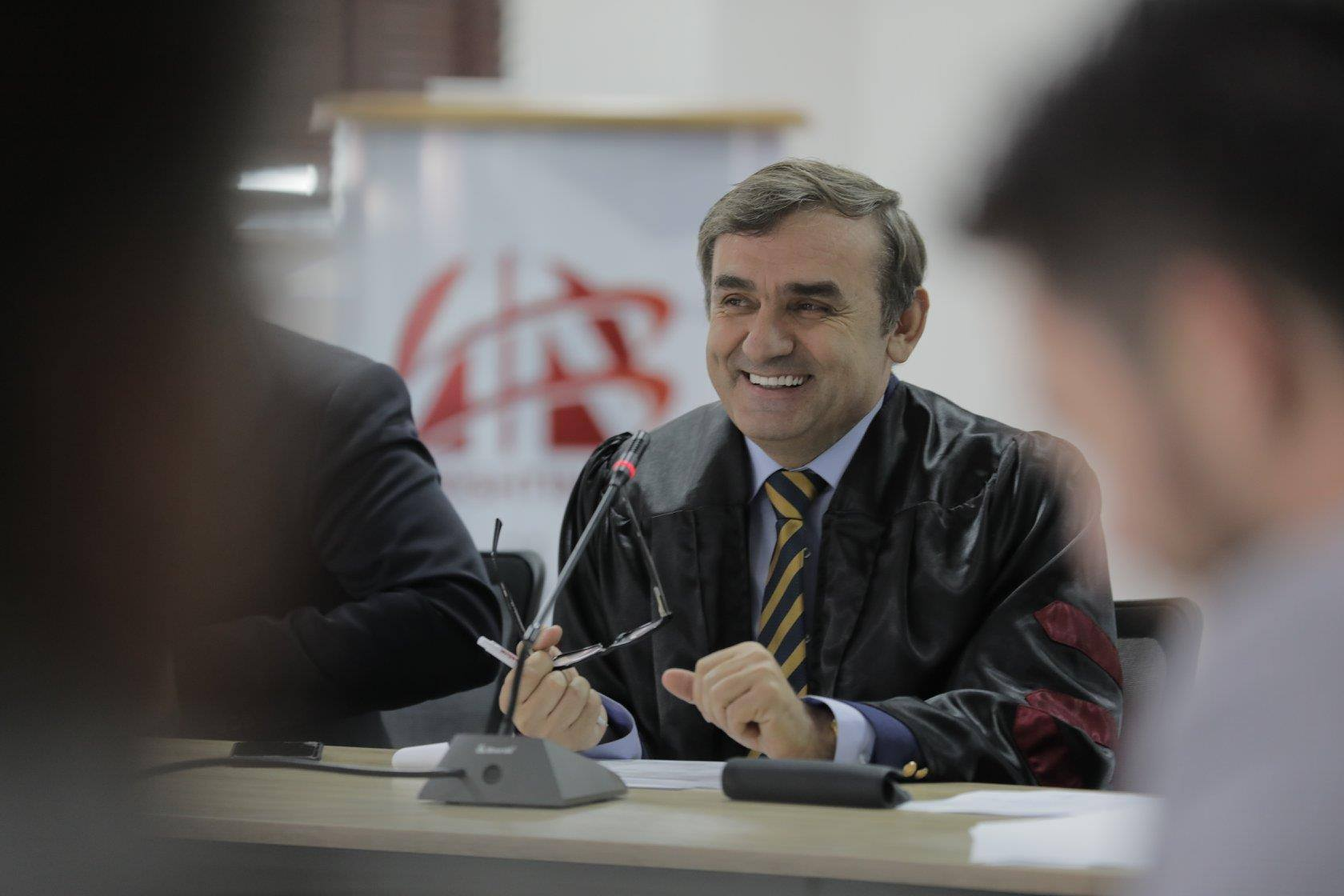
- Born: 2 February 1970 (age 56); Lipjan
- Education: University of Sarajevo, University of Pristina
- Occupations: Poet and Professor
- Writing career
- Subject: Lyrical
- Website: www.lulzimtafa.al

Lulzim Tafa (born 2 February 1970 in Lipjan, Kosovo) is a poet and academic. Tafa served as the Rector of AAB University, the largest non-public university in the Western Balkan region, from 2012 to 2020.

== Early life ==
He was born in Lipjan, near Prishtina, the capital city of the Republic of Kosova. He attained his primary and secondary education in Lipjan, to later finish his graduate and postgraduate studies at the Faculty of Law of the University of Prishtina. Subsequently, Tafa pursued his doctoral studies at the Law Faculty of the University of Sarajevo, ultimately achieving the academic distinction of Doctor of Legal Sciences.

== Career ==
He is dedicated to promoting and supporting the rights of both humans and animals. Notably, he founded the Human Rights Protection Center, the Cultural Center, the AAB Theater "Faruk Begolli" at AAB University and recently, the "Poetry Theater," a theater dedicated solely to poetry. Furthermore, he has established several international awards, including the renowned "Ali Podrimja" international award for Arts and Literature". He is an honorary member of the Council of Albanian Ambassadors (CAA) and a member of the Kosova PEN Center.

He is among the world's most famous and most translated Albanian poets. His works have gained widespread international acclaim, as evidenced by their translations into multiple languages, including: English, German, Italian, Serbian, Croatian, Bosnian, Montenegrin, Turkish, Greek, Romanian, Roma, French, Ukrainian, Azeri, Swedish, Arabic, Macedonian, Russian, Slovenian, Hungarian.

He is member of the Academy of Sciences of Albania, member of the European Academy of Sciences and Arts, etc. He holds many honorary titles in prestigious world academies and universities.

== Awards ==
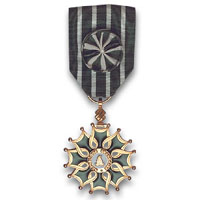
L'OrdreDesArtsOfficier

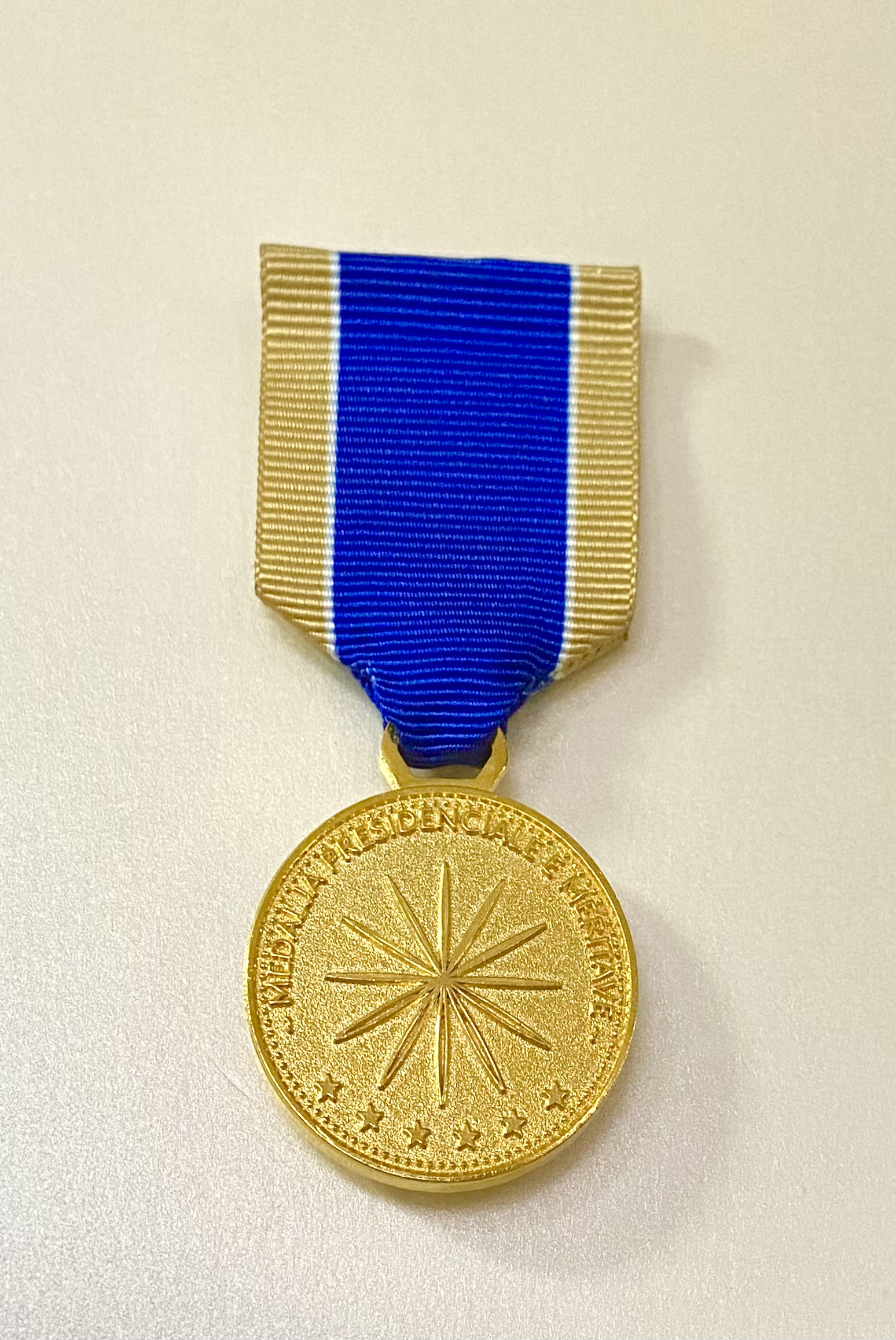
Presidential Medal of Merits - Republic of Kosova

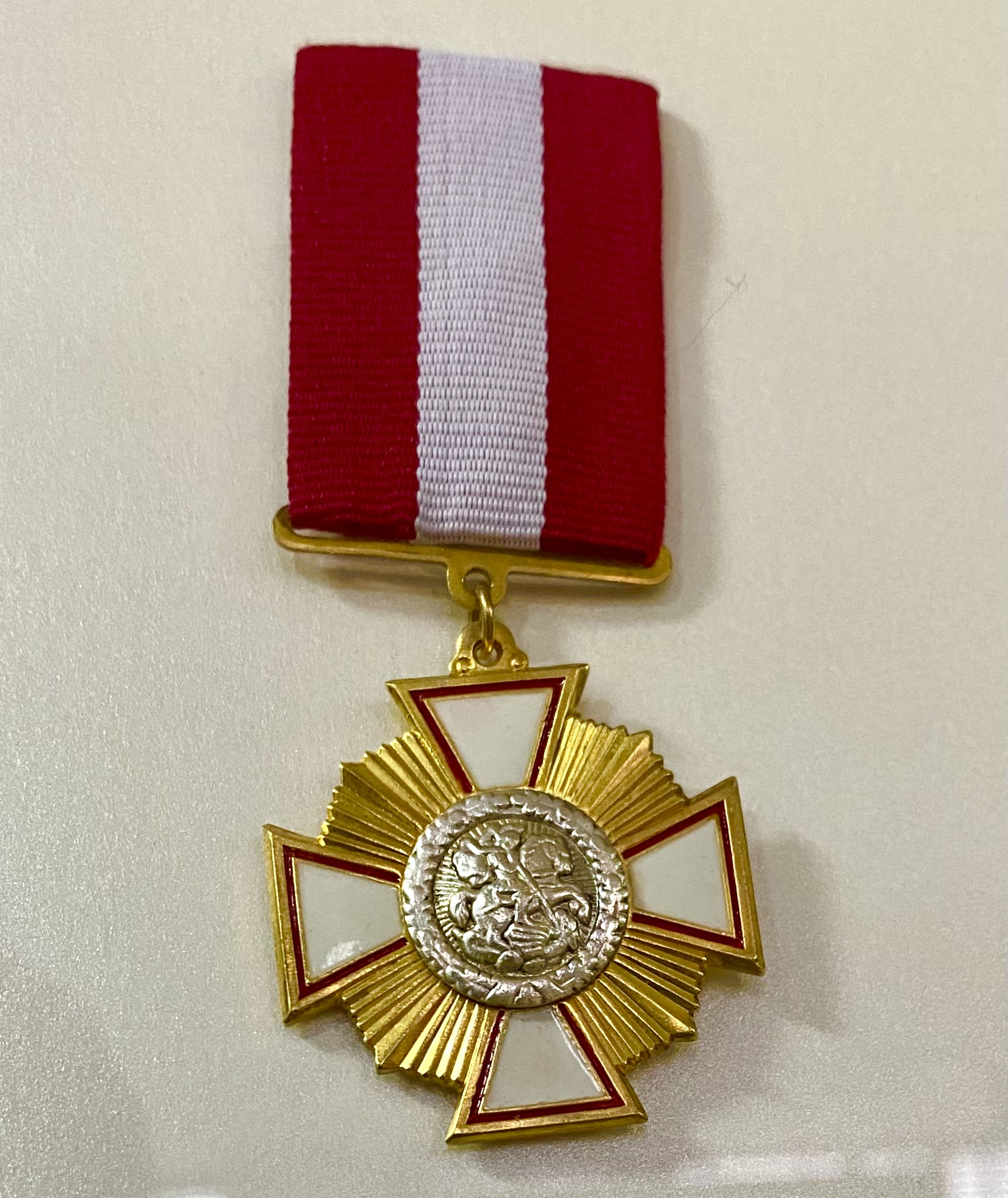
Decoration for Poet Lulzim Tafa - Patriarch of Ukraine, Patriarch Filaret, the "Order of Saint Yuri the Victorious"

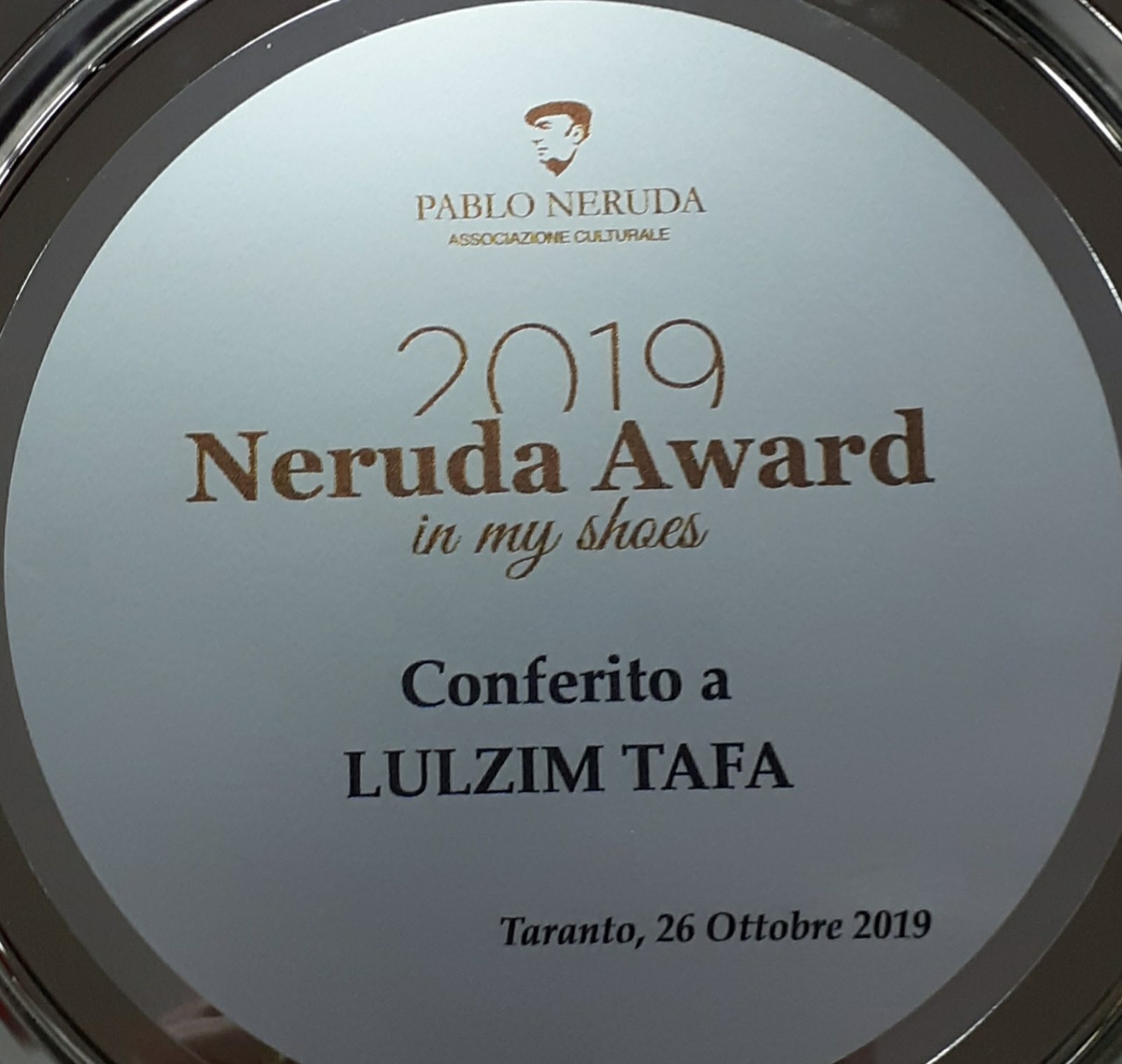
Neruda Awards

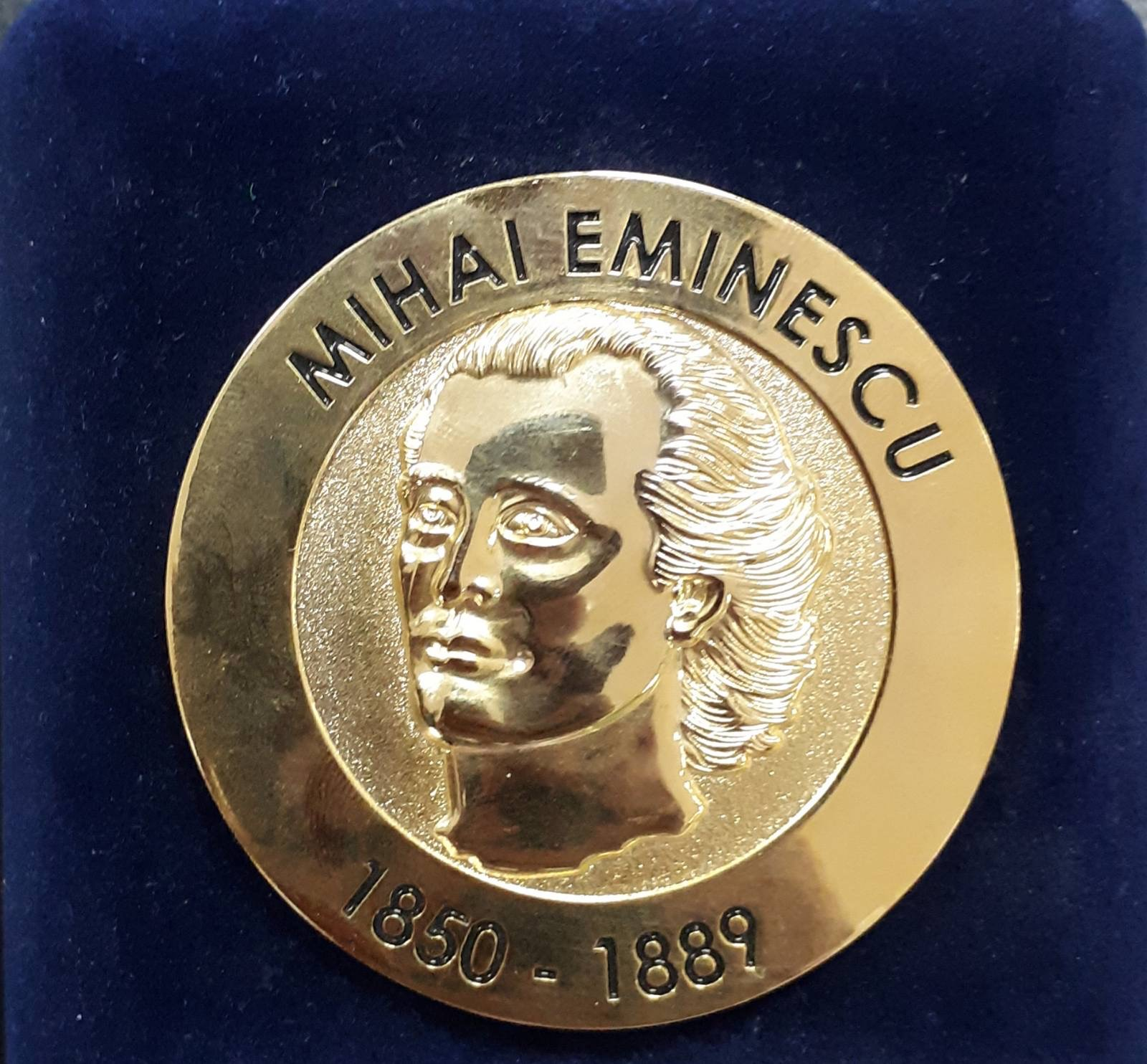
International Prize "Mihai Eminescu"

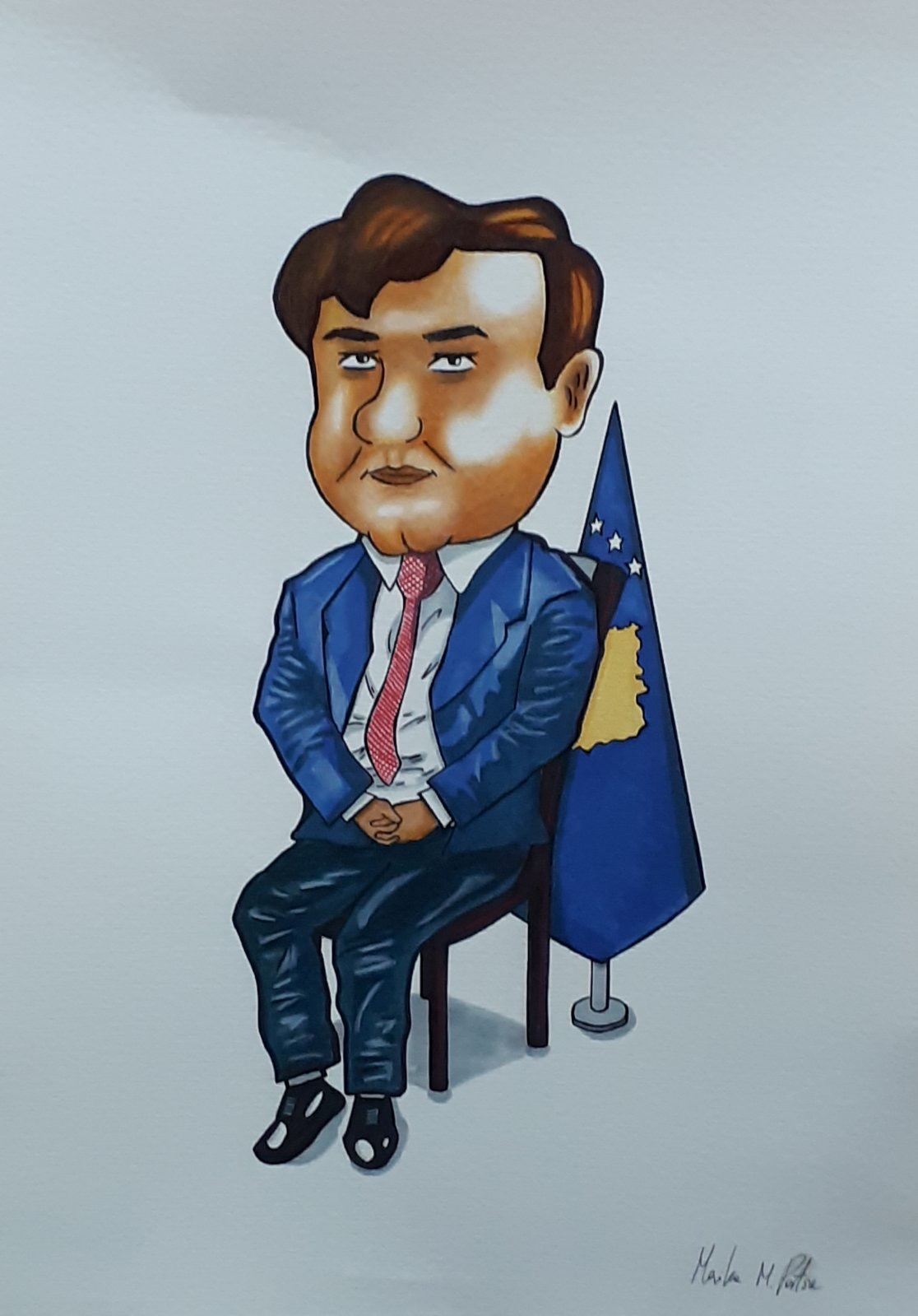
Italian students at the International Poetry Festival in Taranto created a caricature of Mr. Tafa.

- Officer in the French Order of Arts & Letters (2023) Kosovo
- Kosovo Presidential Medal of Merit (2018) Kosovo
- Highest decoration bestowed by the Patriarch of Ukraine, Patriarch Filaret, the "Order of Saint Yuri the Victorious".
- National Poetry Award “At Gjergj Fishta ”(2025) Lezhë, Albania.
- International Award "Mihai Eminescu" (2018) Romania
- International Award "Neruda Awards" (2019) Italy
- International Award "Naji Naaman" (2019) Lebanon
- International Award "Radovan Zogovic" 2016 Montenegro
- "Ramadan Sinani" Book Fair Award (2015) Tetovo, North Macedonia
- International Award "Alexander the Great" (2021) Greece
- “Lirikë me shi” - Azem Shkreli Award (2024) - from The Municipality of Peja
- "Best Poetry Book" Award for “Rivali i Adamit” from the Poetry Meeting in Municipality of Gjakova

== Published books ==
- Rivali i Adamit - Poetry Book, AAB Publishing House, Prishina, 2024
- Gjaku nuk bëhet ujë - Poetry Book, Rilindja, Pristina 1993
- Metaforë e pikëlluar - Poetry Book, Rilindja, Pristina 1995
- Planeti Babiloni - Poetry Book, Rilindja, Prishtina 1997
- Vdekja çon fjalë - Poetry Book, Rilindja Pristina, 1998
- I kam edhe dy fjalë- Poetry Book - Faik Konica, Prishtina, 2011
- Shtini n’dhe këto fjalë - Poetry Book - collection of poems, Faik Konica, Prishtina 2015
- "Flirt" - Poetry Book, Botimet AAB, Pristina 2019 ISBN 978-9951-494-87-8

Collection of poems

- Antologji Personale - Poetry Book - Kosova PEN Center, Prishtina, 2025
- TË DIELAVE MOS MË THIRR, Collection of poems, Armagedoni, Pristina 2019 ISBN 978-9951-780-16-2
- Paketimi i merzisë - Collection of poems, Luma Grafik, Tetovo 2017
- Analogjia e Shëmtisë - Collection of poems, Faik Konica, Prishtina, 2002
- Ekspozitë me ëndrra- Collection of poems, Onufri Publishing House, Tirana, 2024

Some of the publications in foreign languages:

- Traumausstellung Poetry, Amanda Verlag, Sinaia 2013
- Terrible songs Gracious light, New York, 2013
- Under manen sover tiderna Poetry, Erik Hans Forlag, 2012
- Expozitie de vise Poetry, Amanda Edit, 2012
- ''La theorie de l'explication des reves", Poetry, Esprit Des Eagles, 2013
- Vraziji Posao Poetry, Djordan Studio, 2015
- La cronica di una santa Guerra Poetry, Ginta Latina, 2013
- Zavjetne pjesme Poetry, Dignitas, Podgorica, 2016
- Teuta Poetry, Grinta, 2018
- Dali ti imas Bolka Poetry book, Akademski Pecat, 2018
- Ne zovi me Nedeljom poetry book, Allma, Belgrade 2018
- Szokatlan ima, poetry in Hungarian Budapest 2019 ISBN 9786156033024
- Ne Klici me v nedeljo, poetry in Slovenian, Ljubljana 2020 ISBN 978-9616-388-740
- ТОЛКОВАНЕ ДОЖДЛИВЫХ СНОВ, ЛЮЛЬЗИМ ТафА, ЛИТО, poetry book, 2020 (Russian language).
- Bersa e Roslipeimaske, poetry book, Romani emancipacia, Belgrade 2020. ISBN 9788679746511
- ''Тафа Люлзім. "Розмова з камінням", вибрані поезії'', Kyiv, poetry book, 2021 (Ukrainian language). ISBN 978-966-986-455-0
- On Sundays do not call me, poetry book, Edition Cyberwit, Allahabad, India. ISBN 978-81-8253-903-7
