= AAB College =

Private higher education institution in Kosovo

- Kolegji AAB
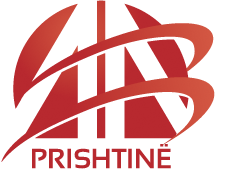
- Motto: Cilësi. Lidership. Sukses!
- Type: Privat
- Established: 2000; 26 years ago
- Affiliations: Erasmus
- Rector: Blerim Olluri
- Faculty: 900+
- Students: 20,000+
- Location: Pristina, Kosovo; 42.6398°N 21.1120°E
- Colours
- Website: www.aab-edu.net

AAB College (Albanian: Kolegji AAB) is a non-public higher education institution in Pristina, Kosovo. AAB College was established in 2000 as the first non-public higher education institution in Kosovo, with its initial study program in mass communication. It has since expanded into a multidisciplinary institution with accredited bachelor's and master's degree programs in law, economics, social sciences, information technology, engineering, and health sciences. The college is licensed by the Ministry of Education, Science and Technology and accredited by the Kosovo Accreditation Agency, which is a full member of the European Quality Assurance Register (EQAR), the Central and Eastern European Network of Quality Assurance Agencies (CEENQA), the International Network for Quality Assurance Agencies in Higher Education (INQAAHE), the Global Academic Integrity Network (GAIN), and an affiliate member of the European Association for Quality Assurance in Higher Education (ENQA).

Operating under the Bologna Process, AAB College aligns its academic structure with European higher education standards, promoting student mobility and academic compatibility.

AAB College also actively participates in the Erasmus+ program, enabling international academic exchanges and enhancing cooperation with partner institutions across Europe. Currently, AAB College is the coordinating institution of the Erasmus+ project WB-Edu4Migration, which focuses on enhancing higher education's role in addressing migration challenges in the Western Balkans.

== Organizational structures ==
=== Organizational structure of AAB College ===
AAB College has an organizational structure that includes academic leadership, administrative management, and student representation.

=== Governance and leadership ===
AAB College is overseen by a Steering Council, which is responsible for institutional governance. The council includes academic administrators and representatives from the founding organization. Daily management of the college is carried out by the rector, who is supported by vice-rectors responsible for different areas such as academic affairs, research, and international cooperation.

== List of Rectors of AAB College ==
Name	Image	Term
Prof. Dr. Masar Stavileci	Masar Stavileci	2006 –2007
Enver Petrovci	Enver Petrovci	2007 – 2008
Uroš Lipušček	Uroš Lipušček	2008 – 2011
Prof. Dr. Lulzim Tafa	Lulzim Tafa, Rector of AAB College	2011 – 2020 - Rector 2023 – 2024 - Acting Rector
Prof. Dr. Bujar Demjaha	Bujar Demjaha	2020 – 2023
Dr. Blerim Olluri	Blerim Olluri	2024 – present

== Academic units ==
AAB College organizes its academic activities into multiple faculties or departments. Each faculty is led by a dean or head of department and is responsible for overseeing academic programs, faculty recruitment, and student assessment. The faculties include:

- Faculty of Social Sciences
- Faculty of Foreign Languages
- Faculty of Public Administration
- Faculty of Arts and Architecture
- Faculty of Economics
- Faculty of Law
- Faculty of Physical Culture and Sports
- Faculty of Mass Communication
- Faculty of Computer Sciences
- Faculty of Psychology
- Faculty of Medical Sciences
- Faculty of Dentistry

Each faculty may be subdivided into departments or study programs, providing specialized academic oversight within its discipline.

== Administrative services ==
AAB College maintains several administrative offices that support academic and institutional operations. These offices handle services such as admissions, student support, financial management, human resources, information technology, and campus maintenance.

Key administrative units include:

- Office of Admissions and Enrollment
- Finance and Accounting Department
- Human Resources and Staff Development
- IT Services and Infrastructure
- Library and Learning Resources

== Student representation and support ==
Students at AAB College may participate in governance through bodies such as a Student Council or Student Union, which coordinate student activities and serve as a link between students and the administration. The college also provides services for students, including career guidance, psychological support, and academic advising.

== Quality assurance and accreditation ==
The institution has established a Quality Assurance Unit that oversees the monitoring and evaluation of academic programs, teaching practices, and administrative procedures. This unit operates in accordance with national accreditation requirements set by the Republic of Kosovo and follows frameworks outlined by the European Higher Education Area (EHEA).

== Affiliations and memberships ==
AAB College holds affiliations and institutional memberships with various academic and professional organizations. These associations are intended to support academic collaboration, research initiatives, and mobility opportunities for students and staff, as well as to facilitate integration within the broader international higher education landscape.

=== International and regional academic networks ===
AAB College is a member of various international and regional academic organizations that promote collaboration in higher education. Among its affiliations, the institution is a member of the European University Association (EUA), which comprises over 800 universities and national rectors' conferences from 48 countries. Through such memberships, AAB College participates in discussions related to higher education policy, institutional development, and academic cooperation within the framework of the European Higher Education Area (EHEA).

=== National and regional collaborations ===
AAB College participates in national and regional academic activities. The institution aligns its programs with national quality standards and collaborates with other higher education organizations in Kosovo and the Western Balkans.

=== Professional and sectoral affiliations ===
AAB College collaborates with sector-specific organizations and professional networks. These partnerships support curriculum development, practical training opportunities, and initiatives aimed at enhancing student employability.

=== Research and innovation networks ===
AAB College participates in research networks that support interdisciplinary collaboration and knowledge exchange. These networks provide opportunities for faculty and students to attend international conferences, access research funding, and collaborate on joint projects. The institution's research office coordinates participation in European research programs and supports academic publishing activities.

=== Commitment to quality and ethical standards ===
AAB College aligns its operations with recognized quality assurance frameworks and engages with international academic organizations that promote standards in higher education. These networks provide access to training, benchmarking activities, and advisory services, which can support institutional development, academic integrity, and transparency.

== Admission process ==
AAB College's admission process is structured to select candidates for its undergraduate and graduate programs in line with national education regulations and the institution's policies. The process typically begins with the publication of admission notices on the college's official website and other relevant platforms, detailing available programs, eligibility criteria, application deadlines, and required documentation.

Prospective students must complete an application form and submit it alongside supporting documents, which usually include academic transcripts, diplomas or certificates, proof of identity, and, where relevant, documentation of language proficiency. For undergraduate admission, applicants are expected to have completed secondary education credentials recognized by the Kosovo Ministry of Education, Science, Technology, and Innovation. Graduate applicants generally need to hold a relevant bachelor's degree, and additional materials such as research proposals or letters of recommendation may be requested for certain programs.

Depending on specific study program, the college may administer entrance exams or conduct interviews aimed at assessing applicants’ academic readiness and suitability for the chosen field of study. An admissions committee reviews all applications, making selections based on academic merit, program requirements, and available capacity.

Once students are admitted, they receive information on enrollment procedures, including registration steps, tuition fees, and orientation. The college also provides support to international students and those requiring additional assistance throughout the admission and enrollment period.

== International Affairs and Cooperation ==
The Office for International Affairs and Cooperation (OIAC) at AAB College coordinates the institution's international relations, partnerships, and mobility programs. Its primary role is to establish and maintain collaborations with universities, research centers, and international organizations to support academic exchanges, joint projects, and capacity-building initiatives.

The office manages international mobility programs such as Erasmus+, overseeing the selection and support of participating students and staff, as well as hosting incoming international visitors. It also facilitates AAB College's involvement in international projects and grant applications, working alongside other institutional units to ensure effective cooperation.

OIAC organizes international events, including conferences and workshops, aimed at fostering dialogue and collaboration with global partners. Additionally, it handles official communications with foreign institutions and administers policies related to internationalization, study abroad, scholarships, and visa guidance.

Through these activities, the office contributes to the college's internationalization efforts by enhancing academic quality and promoting cross-cultural exchange.

== Project Development Office ==
The Project Development Office at AAB College is responsible for initiating, coordinating, and managing international and regional projects related to higher education, research, and innovation. Through partnerships in Europe and the Western Balkans, the office participates in various EU-funded and regional initiatives. Its portfolio includes programs such as Erasmus+ (CBHE, EMJM, Jean Monnet), Horizon Europe, EIT Culture & Creativity, the Western Balkans Fund, and Visegrad+.

The following section lists projects organized by funding call, outlining AAB College's involvement in different international and regional initiatives.

== Erasmus+ CBHE (Capacity Building in Higher Education) ==
1. MORIN: Academic recognition of student mobility based on learning outcomes to support migrant integration. Role: Partner | Countries: Kosovo, Albania, Czechia, Serbia, North Macedonia.

2. WB EDU4MIGRATION: Bridging the skills gap for social care providers via curricula enhancement and micro-credentials. Role: Lead | Countries: Kosovo, Albania, Denmark, Austria, Italy.

3. CORE-ED: Equipping specialists in correctional pedagogy to foster inclusion and shared values in justice systems. Role: Partner | Countries: Kosovo, Albania, Bosnia & Herzegovina, Montenegro, Serbia, Greece, Romania.

4. HOMODIGITALIS: Bridging digital humanities and educational media in the Western Balkans. Role: Partner | Countries: Albania, Kosovo, Bosnia & Herzegovina, North Macedonia, Germany, Greece.

5. UNIGREEN: Embedding sustainability principles into HEI governance, administration, and curricula. Role: Lead | Countries: Kosovo, Albania, Greece, Poland.

6. GREEN IMPACT: Strengthening HEI capacity to lead the green transition via a Whole-Institutional Approach. Role: Partner | Countries: Bulgaria, Spain, Albania, Kosovo, Montenegro.

7. TBEAI@WB: AI-driven curricula, AI hubs, and academia-industry collaboration for entrepreneurs. Role: Lead | Countries: Albania, Portugal, Slovenia, Bosnia & Herzegovina, Kosovo.

== Erasmus+ EMJM (Erasmus Mundus Joint Master) ==
1. FSE-JM: Forensic Sciences Engineering Joint Master Design: Design of an interdisciplinary MSc in forensic sciences. Role: Partner | Countries: Kosovo, Germany, North Macedonia.

== Erasmus+ Jean Monnet ==
1. EU HEALTH ACQUIS: Module on EU Health Legal Framework within Health Care Management studies. Role: Lead | Countries: Kosovo, Albania, Bosnia & Herzegovina, Montenegro, Serbia, Greece, Romania.

2. LEG-EU: Module on integrating EU gender equality laws into law curriculum. Role: Lead | Countries: Kosovo (mono-beneficiary).

3. EU PROGRESS REPORT: Module on Kosovo's EU progress in justice, education, economy, and health. Role: Lead | Countries: Kosovo (mono-beneficiary).

4. KO-in-EU: Centre of Excellence on EU integration, values, role, and impact. Role: Lead | Countries: Kosovo (mono-beneficiary).

== Horizon Europe ==
1. EDU-LAB: Comparative European study of youth education-to-labour transitions. Role: Partner | Countries: Kosovo, Austria, Greece, Portugal, Germany, Italy, UK, Poland, Finland.

2. HUMLIT: Humour Literacy: Exploring humour as a tool to reframe conflicts and promote dialogue. Role: Partner | Countries: Kosovo, Poland, Estonia, Belgium, Czechia, Finland, Greece, Ireland, Romania, Spain, North Macedonia, Norway, Slovenia.

== EIT Culture & Creativity ==
1. CREATECH: Boosting innovation and entrepreneurship in CCIs through training, start-up support, and partnerships. Role: Partner | Countries: Albania, Italy, Slovenia, Kosovo, Greece, Belgium, North Macedonia, UK.

== Other Calls ==
1. STUDENTS FOR SUSTAINABLE DEVELOPMENT (Western Balkans Fund): Students' engagement in campus sustainability initiatives and green careers. Role: Lead | Countries: Kosovo, North Macedonia, Montenegro.

2. SUSTAIN EDU (Visegrad+ Grants): Supporting HEI staff to integrate SDGs into teaching, research, and innovation. Role: Lead | Countries: Kosovo, Albania, Poland, Czech Republic.

3. LET'S PLAY MATHS (Erasmus+ KA220-SCH): Using sport-based teaching methods to enhance mathematics learning. Role: Partner | Countries: Kosovo, North Macedonia, Romania, France.

== Conferences and public events ==
On 3-4 September 2026, AAB College hosted the AI & Tech Summit 2026 in Pristina. The two-day event brought together representatives of public institutions, academia, technology companies, start-ups and civil society. Its programme included lectures, panel discussions, workshops and a technology exhibition focusing on artificial intelligence, digital transformation, cybersecurity, education, business and technological innovation.

== Graduation at AAB College ==
The graduation ceremony at AAB College is an annual academic event held in Pristina, Kosovo, marking the completion of undergraduate and postgraduate studies. It serves as a formal recognition of students' academic achievements and symbolizes their transition into professional and civic life.

The ceremony typically includes the conferral of degrees by faculty representatives, speeches by institutional leaders and invited guests, and the awarding of diplomas and academic honors. Graduates wear traditional academic regalia, reflecting international academic customs.

The event is attended by students, faculty, staff, families, and guests, and emphasizes the institution's values of academic excellence, ethical leadership, and lifelong learning. It also encourages continued engagement through alumni networks.

== Publishing and Libraries at AAB College ==
AAB College supports its academic programs through publishing activities and library services.

The institution publishes a peer-reviewed scientific journal titled THESIS, which includes research articles and scholarly discussions across various academic disciplines. In addition, AAB College publishes conference proceedings, research monographs, and textbooks related to its academic fields.

The AAB College Library provides access to a variety of print and electronic resources, including books, journals, databases, and multimedia materials.

== Awards at AAB College ==
AAB College annually presents a range of awards to students, faculty, and external contributors in recognition of academic excellence, professional achievements, and contributions to various fields.

The institution recognizes students for academic performance, including highest grade point averages, theses, and involvement in extracurricular activities.

Formal ceremonies are held for the presentation of awards.

AAB College also confers several international awards to individuals who have made notable contributions in various sectors:

1. International Award for Democracy and Integration – Presented to individuals for their contributions to democracy and social integration. One of the recipients is Doris Pack, recognized for her efforts in promoting international recognition and supporting Kosovo's democratic development.

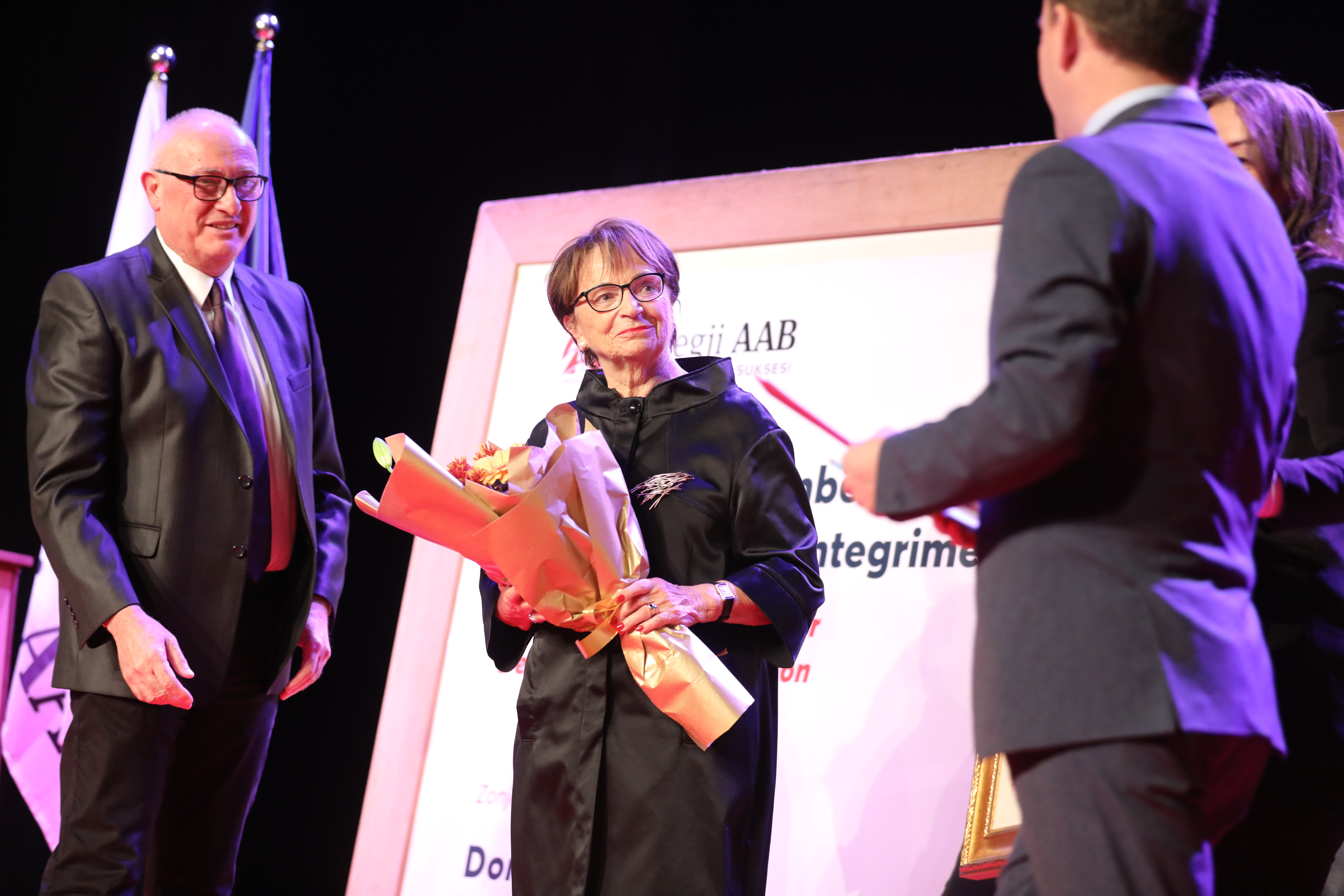
Doris Pack receiving the award from AAB, 2022

2. International Human Rights Award – Recognizes individuals for their efforts in human rights advocacy.

Notable recipients include:

- Jamie Shea (2016) for his role as NATO spokesperson during the Kosovo conflict and his advocacy for humanitarian intervention.
- William G. Walker (2017) for his role as Head of the OSCE Kosovo Verification Mission, especially his reporting on the Račak massacre.
- Massimo D'Alema (2018) for his diplomatic efforts in Southeast Europe.
- Milo Đukanović (2022) for his contributions to democratic reform and regional cooperation.

3. International Award for High Scientific and Artistic Achievement – Recognizes individuals for their contributions in the fields of research and the arts.

- Nexhmije Pagarusha (2013) for her outstanding contribution to Albanian music and cultural heritage.

4. Ali Podrimja International Literature Award – Named after the late Albanian poet Ali Podrimja, the award honors significant literary achievements.

Recipients include:

- Ismail Kadare (2013) for his contributions to world literature.
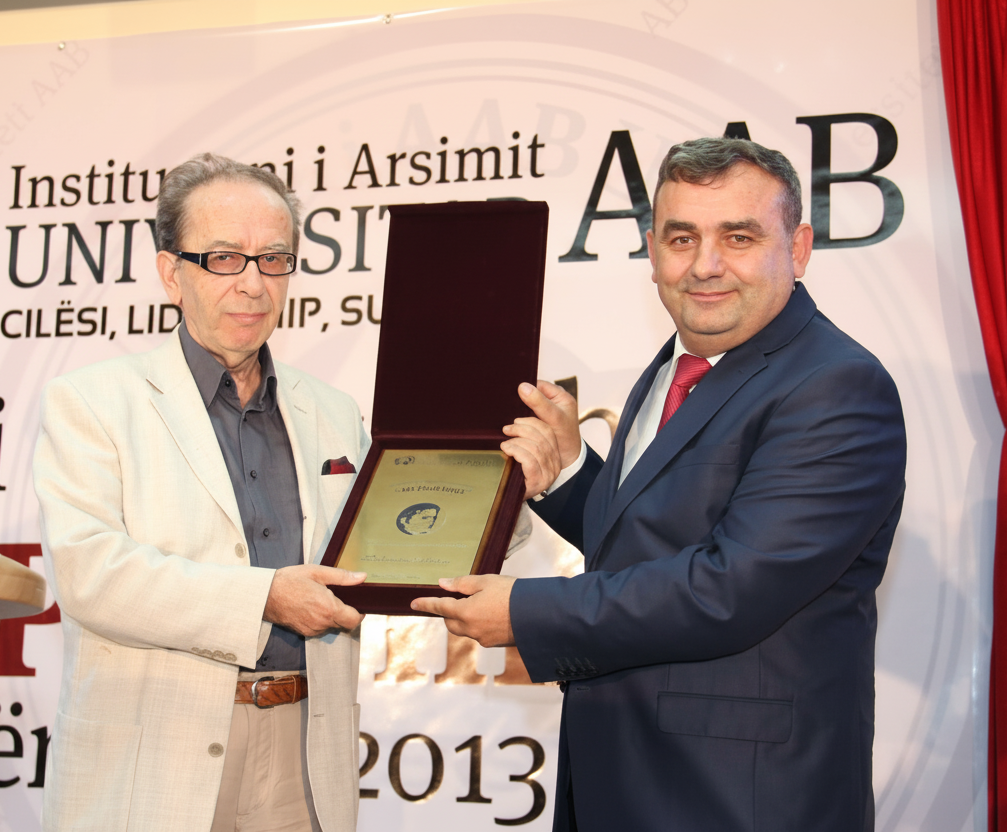
  Ismail Kadare receiving the "Ali Podrimja International Literature" Award, 2013.
- Jevrem Brković (2015) for his c*

== See also ==
- Education in Kosovo
- List of universities in Kosovo
- Higher education in Kosovo
- Kosovo
