= Aferdita =

Aferdita or Afërdita is a feminine given name of Albanian origin. Notable people with the given name include:

- Afërdita Deva-Zuna (born 1950), Kosovar university professor
- Afërdita Dreshaj (born 1986), Albanian-American singer, model and beauty pageant titleholder
- Aferdita Kameraj (born 1984), German former footballer
- Aferdita Suka (born 1980), German politician
- Afërdita Tusha (1945–2018), Albanian female sports shooter
- Afërdita Veveçka Priftaj (1948–2017), Albanian physicist

== See also ==
- Afërdita, the dawn goddess, goddess of love, beauty, fertility, health and protector of women, in the Albanian pagan mythology
