= Hajrullah Koliqi =

Albanian educational theorist and pedagogue

Hajrullah Koliqi (1946) is an Albanian educator, lecturer and university professor from Montenegro.

== Biography ==
Koliqi was born in Kështenjë (Krajë), Municipality of Bar (Tivar), in Montenegro. He completed primary school in his hometown, namely in Ostros. After Normal School of Prishtina, he studied pedagogical sciences at the Faculty of Philosophy in Prishtina, where he also obtained his doctorate (1987). One school year (1966/67) he was a teacher in his hometown, while from 1973 he developed his entire career in the pedagogy department of the Faculty of Philosophy of the University of Prishtina, first as an assistant, then as a lecturer, docent, associate professor and to the ordinary one. He has also been an external cooperator at the University of Tetova since its establishment.

He performed various tasks and functions in higher educational institutions in Kosovo and in educational and pedagogical associations, including the Minister of Education and Science in the Provisional Government of Kosovo, president of the publishing council of the University of Prishtina, vice-chairman of the League of Albanian Teachers (Lidhja e Arsimtarëve Shqiptar), as well as a member of professional councils or editors of several scientific and cultural magazines. He did intensive work for the survival and independence of Albanian education in Kosovo, especially the University of Prishtina, in the years 1991–1999. He was among the organizers of the student protests of 1997. The basic areas of scientific-professional interest of Mr. Koliqi are: the history of education and Albanian and world pedagogical thought, andragogy, comparative pedagogy, philosophy of education, etc., about which he wrote numerous scientific-professional articles. He was also a participant in many roundtables and scientific conferences in Kosovo and abroad. The result of his scientific-professional work is also a number of monographic works, university texts, etc.

== Publications ==
Author

- Aleksandër Xhuvani: Puna edukativo-arsimore dhe pikëpamjet pedagogjike (Aleksandër Xhuvani: Educational work and pedagogical views), 1987
- Andragogjia (Andragogy), 1987, 1990
- Kraja ndër mote (Kraja Among the Times), 1993
- Mbijetesa e Universitetit të Prishtinës 1991–1994, 1995
- Das Überleben der Universität Prishtina 1991–1996 (in German), 1997
- The Survival of the University of Prishtina 1991–1996 (in English), 1997
- Historia e pedagogjisë botërore I (History of World Pedagogy 1), 1997
- Historia e pedagogjisë botërore II (History of World Pedagogy 2); 1998
- Historiku i arsimit në Krajë (History of education in Kraja), 1999
- Kraja e Shkodrës (Kraja of Shkodra), 2001
- Historia e arsimit dhe e mendimit pedagogjik shqiptar (History of Albanian Education and Pedagogical Thought), 2002
- Sistemi i arsimit në Kosovë (The Education System in Kosova), 2004
- Jashar Rexhepagiqi: Portret (Jashar Rexhepagiqi: Portrait) , 2004
- Thesar filoedukimi – Thesaurus of Philoeducation, (in Albanian) & (in English), 2007
- Jashar Rexhepagiqi: Figurë e shquar e arsimit dhe e shkencës (Jashar Rexhepagiqi: Distinguished Figure of Education and Science), 2009
- Gruaja ndër shekuj: Arsimimi dhe emancipimi i saj (Woman Across Centuries: Education and Her Emancipation), 2009
- 40 vjet të tempullit tonë të diturisë: Shkrime për Universitetin e Prishtinës (40 Years of Our Temple of Knowledge: Writings about the University of Prishtina), 2010
- Ata që jetën na e falën (Those Who Gave Us Life), 2010
- Fjalor Enciklopedik i Edukimit (Encyclopedic Dictionary of Education), 2022

Coauthor

- Gjendja dhe pozita e arsimit shqip në Kosovë në periudhën 1990–95 (The condition and position of Albanian education in Kosovo in the period 1990-95) , 1996
- Në kërkim të dijes dhe të lirisë (Searching for Knowledge and Freedom), 2004, (coauthor & editor)
- Universiteti i Prishtinës 1970–2005 (University of Prishtina 1970–2005), 2005
- Në një cep të Ilirisë (In one corner of Illyria), 2007
- Kosova – Vështrim monografik (Kosova – Monographic overview), 2011

== See also ==
- Education in Kosovo
- History of education in Albania
