= Radivojević =

Radivojević or Radivojevich (Cyrillic script: Радивојевић) is a patronymic surname derived from a masculine given name Radivoje. Notable people with the surname include:

- Branko Radivojevič (born 1980), Slovak professional ice hockey player of Serbian ancestry
- Desnica Radivojević, Bosnian politician
- Juraj Radivojević (died c. 1408), Bosnian nobleman
- Jovan Radivojević (born 1982), Serbian professional football player
- Katarina Radivojević (born 1979), Serbian actress
- Milan Radivojević, Yugoslav basketball player
- Miloš Radivojević (born 1939), Serbian television and movie director
- Paul von Radivojevich (1759–1829), Austrian general of the Napoleonic era of Serbian antecedents
- Saša Radivojević (born 1979), Serbian professional football goalkeeper
- Vladimir Radivojević (born 1986), Serbian professional football player
- Vuk Radivojević (born 1983), Serbian professional basketball player
- Julija Radivojević (born 1799), Serbian writer
