= Pedagogical Institute of Kosovo =

The Pedagogical Institute of Kosovo (PIK) is a professional research and educational institution established in 2007, with its headquarters in Pristina. PIK plays a crucial role in the development and improvement of the educational system in Kosovo, focusing on enhancing the quality of education through teacher training, curriculum development, and educational research.

== Overview ==
The inception of Pedagogical Institute of Kosovo began in March 2003, during a meeting in Milan, Italy, where working groups were formed to draft a project based on a preliminary agreement between the Ministry of Education, Science, and Technology (MASHT) and Centro Europa Scuola Educazione e Società (CESES). The first draft was completed in April 2004 and submitted to decision-making institutions in October 2005, receiving approval from MASHT, the Italian government, and C.E.S.E.S. The Board of Directors and the Scientific Council were appointed in March 2006, and in February 2007, a competition for research personnel was announced. By March 2007, selected researchers underwent intensive training in research methodologies in Milan.

PIK’s mission is to provide professional services to MASHT and educational institutions at all levels in Kosovo through research, training, counseling, monitoring, and evaluation, along with professional publications in various educational fields. A key objective is to research, analyze, and compare educational achievements in Kosovo with those in other countries. PIK also focuses on developing research work according to sector tasks in areas such as curriculum standards, textbooks, evaluation, and training of teachers and educational leaders.

The institute operates through four sectors: the research sector, lifelong learning sector, general education sector, and the evaluation and standards sector. It is also involved in publishing activities, including the journal Kërkime Pedagogjike, and has released several professional-pedagogical works. PIK aims to contribute to the development and modernization of the educational system in Kosovo by engaging in research, training, assessments, experimentation, and educational innovations.

== See also ==
- Education in Kosovo
