= University of Pristina (1969–1999) =

Historical university

Coordinates: 42.6486°N 21.1675°E

- Универзитет у Приштини; Univerzitet u Prištini; Universiteti i Prishtinës
- Seal of University of Pristina
- Active: 1969–1999
- Location: Pristina, AP Kosovo and Metohija, Serbia, Yugoslavia

The University of Pristina was founded in the Socialist Autonomous Province of Kosovo, Socialist Republic of Serbia, Yugoslavia, in the city of Pristina, for the academic year 1969–1970 and functioned until 1999. However, owing to political upheaval, war, successive mutual expulsions of faculty of one ethnicity or the other, and resultant pervasive ethnic-based polarisation, there came to be two disjoint institutions using the same name, albeit idiosyncratically to reflect ethnic identity. Albanian-language activity continues at the original location (University of Pristina), whilst the Serbian-language University of Priština has relocated to North Mitrovica, where it maintains its place within the Serbian education system.

== History ==
=== Foundation ===
The first higher education institutions in Kosovo were founded during 1958-69 (Higher Pedagogical School of Prishtina, Faculty of Philosophy, etc.) and they functioned independently or as part of the University of Belgrade. As the League of Communists of Kosovo requested more self-governance for the region, extensive protests occurred in Kosovo during November 1968. As a result, the University of Pristina was established in 1969-70. The university's first faculties were those of engineering, medicine, law and philosophy, while the languages of instruction were Albanian and Serbo-Croat. Because the organizational status of the institution was language-based it is often regarded as two separate universities.

Albanian leaders of Kosovo welcomed the university's foundation, but expressed the view that the university was a milestone towards political equality within the federation and not a final goal. Follow an invitation, a delegation of the university visited the University of Tirana in the People's Socialist Republic of Albania in period between 19 and 29 October 1970 where they signed cooperation and exchange agreement. While the opening of the university was supported by Josip Broz Tito, according to a Kosovo Communist leader at the time, the university had faced strong political opposition from the Serbian Communists, who regarded it "as a harbinger of autonomy for Kosovo." As early as 1971, there were Serb and Montenegrin protests against the opening of the university.

=== 1970s ===
In the 1970s, the university was expanded rapidly with respect to Albanian language instruction, from 7,712 students in the academic year 1969/70 to 43,321 in the academic year 1980/81, its highest student population ever. Ideologically, it acted upon strengthening of Albanian national conscience. The university was the scene of repeated Albanian nationalist protests. In 1974, at least 100 students were arrested for participating in nationalist protests.

=== The 1981 demonstrations ===
The university was the starting point of the 1981 Kosovo student protests. Although the authorities again blamed the protests on nationalist radicals, contributing factors included Kosovo's cultural isolation within Yugoslavia and its endemic poverty, which resulted in the province having the highest ratio of both students and illiterates in Yugoslavia. At the same time the university system contributed to unemployment, with highly educated and resentful Albanians becoming prime recruits for nationalist sentiment. In addition, the Serb and Montenegrin population of Kosovo increasingly resented the economic and social burden incurred by the university's student population. By 1981, the University of Pristina had 20,000 students – one in ten of the city's total population.

The demonstrations started on 11 March 1981, originally as a spontaneous small-scale protest for better food in the school cafeteria and improved living conditions in the dormitories. They were dispersed by police but resumed two weeks later on 26 March 1981. This time, the police used force to disperse a sit-in by Albanian students in a dormitory, injuring 35 people and arresting 21. The violence provoked mass demonstrations across Kosovo, a state of emergency, riots and numerous casualties.

Following the demonstrations, the university faculty and students were purged of those deemed to be "separatists". 226 students and workers were tried, convicted and sentenced to up to fifteen years in prison. The president of the university and two rectors were among those who were replaced with Communist Party hardliners. The university was also prohibited from using textbooks imported from Albania; from then on, the university was only permitted to use books translated from Serbo-Croatian. The demonstrations also produced a backlash among Serbian politicians. The university was denounced by the Serbian Communist leadership as a "fortress of nationalism".

During the 80s, the university, however, continued to back requests for change of Kosovo's status and the spread ideology of Enver Hoxha and Maoism, and the propagate creation of Greater Albania, mostly due to Albanian professors from Tirana. Meanwhile, the actual work of the university was practically impossible due to frequent Albanian demonstrations and political infighting between Serbian and Albanian members of its administration. Sometimes, entire dormitories were shut down and years were disrupted because of the demonstrations.

=== 1990–1998 ===
At the end of the 1980s, at the behest of Slobodan Milošević, the constitution of Serbia was changed and the autonomy of Kosovo curtailed.

Management of provincial universities, University of Priština and the Novi Sad, located in Vojvodina, was transferred from provincial authorities to Belgrade. The University of Priština was a key target for repression. As with other education in Kosovo at the time, the University's existing curriculum was abolished and replaced with a new one devised in Belgrade. Albanian lecturers and students widely refused to accept the new curricula and educational changes imposed by the Serbian Parliament, also protesting against the ongoing curtailment of Kosovar autonomy in general. Consequently, many Albanian lecturers were accused of breaking the Serbian education laws, dismissed and replaced by Serbs. In some cases dismissal was done under other pretexts (such as, for example, "for leaving the faculty building during working hours"). The Rector, Professor Ejup Statovci, was imprisoned after writing a letter asking for the university buildings to be returned to the Albanian faculty and students. His Serbian replacement, Professor Radivoje Papović, explained the official reasoning for the changes made at the University:

Our first task was to remove the hatred for all that is Serbian which had been accumulated here for decades. This factory of evil, established with the basic intention of destroying Serbia and the Serbian name... is now destroyed thanks to the coordinated action of the government and university personnel.... Our university has the ultimate object of renewing Serbian thought in Kosovo and Metohija.

On 16 January 1997, Papović was seriously injured in a car bomb attack by the Kosovo Liberation Army (KLA) member Nait Hasani.

The composition of the student body also changed drastically. A new enrolment policy was implemented which – in theory, provided for a one-to-one ratio between the two language groups, i.e., 1,580 full-time students in each, commencing from the start of the 1991–92 academic year. In practice, Albanian language students boycotted education, reducing the Albanian student body from 27,000 to nil. This was welcomed by many Serbs, as funding would now be spent only on non-Albanian students. Remaining Albanian professors have continued to work for a while; however, after a year and a half of boycott, they were technological surpluses and were mostly dismissed. Those who were needed have been offered to work on education in Serbian language; however, because of threats and pressure directed at them by other Albanians, very few remained. Thus, Albanians have effectively shut themselves out of the university entirely: there were no Albanian-speaking staff to teach the students, and no Albanian-speaking students for the staff to teach.

The Albanian-language education then continued in private facilities as part of the unofficial parallel shadow state, a self-declared Republic of Kosovo that had been established by Kosovo's Albanians, enabling the education of some 30,000 Albanian students to continue. The university, which also called itself the University of Pristina, was financed by the Albanian diaspora and parallel tax system and existed without any connection to the academic system, which led to a worsening of the quality of education (for example, students of medicine had no access to clinics, laboratories or other necessary equipment). However, the university professors have reported about a large number of graduates, magisters and doctors: the university issued graduation certificates in the name of the Republic of Kosovo, which were not recognized by the Federal Republic of Yugoslavia. State security forces subjected the parallel schools to repeated raids and harassment.

In the second half of the 1990s, the Government of Serbia started negotiations with Albanian leaders about the university, which in 1998, as the crisis in Kosovo was building, led to an agreement between the Serbian authorities and Kosovo Albanian leaders to permit the return of Albanian students to the university. According to the agreement between Slobodan Milošević and Ibrahim Rugova, Kosovo Albanians should get control over 60% of the university campus, Serbs 35%, and Turks 5%. Three buildings of the university were turned over to the Kosovo Albanians on 15 May 1998. However, Kosovo Serb protesters staged violent protests against the transfer and eventually had to be evicted by government forces. The buildings were extensively devastated, with furniture and equipment deliberately vandalized as to make them unusable.

=== Kosovo War and its aftermath ===
The Kosovo War of 1999 completely disrupted both the official university and its shadow counterpart. After the issuing of Resolution 1244 and the coming of the Kosovo Force (KFOR) most of the staff and students fled from Kosovo in early June 1999; by August 1999, only two months after the war's end, the Serbian population of Pristina had fallen from 40,000 to under 1,000.

As a result, the university broke up into two institutions claiming the same name: one with headquarters in Pristina and another in North Mitrovica.

== Notables ==
=== Faculty ===
- Eshref Ademaj, professor of mathematical sciences
- Bardhyl Çaushi, dean of law
- Ukshin Hoti, professor of international law
- Idriz Ajeti, dean of Faculty of Philosophy

=== Doctors of Honor ===
- 1975 - Mr. Josip Broz Tito – Yugoslavia (Former President of SFR Yugoslavia)
- 1975 - Mr. Fakhruddin Ali Ahmed – India (Former President of India)
- 1987 - Mr. Dragiša Ivanović – Yugoslavia (Professor at the University of Belgrade)

== See also ==
- List of split up universities
