= Pajazit Nushi =

Kosovan psychologist and educational theorist

Pajazit Nushi (January 8, 1933 – September 2, 2015) was a Kosovan university professor, psychologist and scientific and social-political worker. He was a member of the Kosova Academy of Sciences and Arts.

== Biography ==
Pajazit Nushi was born on January 8, 1933, in Gjakova. He completed primary school and normal school in his hometown. He continued his studies at the, Department of Experimental Psychology, Faculty of Philosophy, University of Belgrade, which he completed on September 28, 1955. In 1955, he completed the state exam for professor of psychology and educational (pedagogical) psychology. He crowned his higher studies on June 8, 1983, when he defended his doctoral dissertation thesis entitled, "Development of psychological terminology and the semantic basis of its definition in the Albanian language" (Albanian: Zhvillimi i terminologjisë psikologjike dhe baza semantike e përcaktimit të saj në gjuhën shqipe) at the Faculty of Philosophy of the University of Pristina. Furthermore, he worked as a professor of psychology and logic at the Gjakova Gymnasium and a professor of psychology subjects at the Normal School in Prizren and at the Normal School in Pristina. In 1963, he was elected director of the Organization for the Advancement of Schools of the Autonomous Province of Kosovo.

In September 1964, he was accepted as a professor of psychology subjects at the Higher Pedagogical School of Pristina and from 1974 a lecturer, then docent, associate professor and ordinary professor of general psychology at the Faculty of Philosophy of the University of Pristina. In the meantime, he exercised various administrative and political duties at the level of the municipality, the district, Kosovo and the former – Yugoslav Federation, in which the task was mainly concerned with the organization of the educational system, scientific work and cultural and artistic creativity. From 1982, he worked at the Miroslav Krleža Institute of Lexicography in Zagreb, in the Kosovo Editorial Office, where he was the editor of the Encyclopedia of Yugoslavia of the Albanian language edition. On September 31, 1991, due to political reasons, he was forced to retire early, but continued his educational and scientific work at the Faculty of Philosophy of the University of Pristina]. In 2000, he was elected a corresponding member of Kosova Academy of Sciences and Arts – ASAK. On November 25, 2008, he was elected a regular member of ASAK. For a period of time, he was vice-president of the All-Albanian Association of Psychologists and president of the Council for the Protection of Human Rights and Freedoms (Albanian: Këshilli për Mbrojtjen e të Drejtave dhe Lirive të Njeriut) based in Pristina.

Professor Pajazit Nushi died on September 2, 2015, in Pristina.

== Scientific activity ==
Professor Pajazit Nushi had started to deal with writing, publishing and scientific work from an early age. Since he was a teacher at the Normal School of Prizren, he started organizing the psychology cabinet, where students practiced psychological research for education and educational needs. In this cabinet, he demonstrated how to compile tests and questionnaires for psychological research. From the beginning of his professional and scientific activity, he has put the professional and methodological knowledge of psychological research at the service of the educational process of the Albanian schools. From the analysis of the results of the first psychological research, it is observed the application of the methods and research procedures of psychology, such as the method of controlled observation, the survey procedure and the tests, while later the experimental research and the semantic differential procedure and the tests were applied sociometric, etc.

The application of a range of methods and the results achieved in tracking the sociometric ratios of primary school students, the development of intelligence in adults, the perception and, the degree of readability of the letters of the alphabet of the Albanian language, the social attitudes of students of political sciences of the University of Tirana, the University of Pristina, and the University of Tetova, etc. his empirical study engagement in the important psychological, social and cultural issues of the development of Albanians is noted.

== Selected publications ==
- 1964, Bazat psikologjike të kulturës së të folurit të nxënësve të shkollës fillore (Psychological bases of speech culture of primary school students), Pristina.
- 1983, Zhvillimi i terminologjisë psikologjike dhe baza semantike e përcaktimit të saj në gjuhën shqipe (Development of psychological terminology and the semantic basis of its definition in the Albanian language), Pristina.
- 1986, Psikologjia për klasën e dytë gjimnaz (Psychology for the second grade of high school), 2000, 2001, 2003, Pristina
- 1987, Fjalor i psikologjisë (Dictionary of psychology), Pristina.
- 1987, Sistemi i grafisë së tingujve të shqipes dhe vetitë perceptive e përmasat e lexueshmërisë së shkronjave të alfabetit të gjuhës shqipe (The graphic system of Albanian sounds and the perceptual properties and readability dimensions of the letters of the alphabet of the Albanian language), Pristina.
- 1997, Psikologjia e përgjithshme - Kaptina të zgjedhura (General Psychology - Selected Topics), Pristina.
- 1997, Të nxënit e lëndëve shkollore dhe zotërimi i tyre (Learning school subjects and mastering them), Pristina.
- 1999, Psikologjia e përgjithshme II – Njeriu dhe personaliteti i tij në psikologji (General psychology II – Man and his personality in psychology), Pristina.
- 2002, Psikologjia e përgjithshme I (General psychology I), Pristina.
- 2004, Orientimi profesional dhe individualiteti psikofiziologjik i zgjedhësit të profesionit (Professional orientation and psychophysiological individuality of the profession chooser), Pristina.
- 2015, Leksikon i psikologjisë (Lexicon of psychology), Pristina
