= Afërdita Deva-Zuna =

Afërdita Deva-Zuna (born 1950) is a Kosovar university professor, researcher in the field of family pedagogy, and author of pedagogical works and studies. She made significant contributions to the development of pedagogical thought in Kosovo.

== Biography ==
Born in Mitrovica in 1950, she completed her primary and secondary education in Pristina. She studied pedagogical sciences at the Faculty of Philosophy of the University of Pristina. She obtained her master's degree from the Faculty of Philosophy at the University of Zagreb and her doctorate in 1997 from the Faculty of Philosophy of the University of Pristina, focusing on fundamental factors of family education and their impact on preschool children's upbringing.

Prof. Afërdita began her professional career as a teacher of psychology, logic, and philosophy at the Pristina Gymnasium. She later became an assistant professor in various pedagogical subjects at the Faculty of Philosophy, University of Pristina. Over the years, she held positions such as lecturer, associate professor, and full professor for subjects like Pedagogy II and Family Pedagogy. She also worked at the Faculty of Education, the Center in Pristina, and in Gjakova. From 1997 to 2004, she worked at the State University of Tetovo. She was a member of the Study Board for Master's programs in the Department of Pedagogy at the Faculty of Philosophy in Pristina and served as its secretary. She was also the head of the Department of Pedagogy and held other professional roles. Throughout her career, she participated in numerous training programs across different cities, enhancing her professional expertise. In addition to her teaching and administrative roles, Prof. Afërdita conducted research and authored several professional works.

== Publications ==
- "Edukimi i parashkollorit në familje" (Preschool Education in Families), 2003
- "Standardet e edukimit dhe arsimit parashkollor" (Standards of Preschool Education), 2006
- "Kurrikula e edukimit parashkollor në Kosovë" (Curriculum of preschool education in Kosovo), 2006
- "Dhuna në familje nën thjerrën pedagogjike" (Family Violence Under Pedagogical Lens), 2008
- "Një shkollë pa dhunë" (A school without violence), 2012, (coauthor)
- "Pedagogjizimi: Kjo polifoni edukative" (Pedagogization: This educational polyphony), 2017

== See also ==
- Education in Kosovo
- University of Pristina
