= Prishtina Normal School =

Teaching college in Pristina, Kosovo

The Prishtina Normal School was a teachers' college in Kosovo, established on 17 December 1941, during the Italian occupation of Kosovo. It was a cornerstone in the development of the educational system in Kosovo and in the region. Initially created to address the critical need for qualified teachers in Kosovo's Albanian schools, the institution quickly became a vital academic, educational and cultural hub. Over the years, it played a significant role in training educators and fostering intellectual growth, leaving a lasting legacy through its distinguished alumni and contributions to Kosovo's educational system. Between 1946 and 1953, the school operated in Gjakova. The Prishtina Normal School ceased to exist in 1974.

== Overview ==
The establishment of Prishtina Normal School on 17 December 1941 was aimed at meeting the substantial need for teachers in Albanian-language schools in Kosovo. The first principal of the school was Rexhep Krasniqi, who was later succeeded by Ahmet Gashi.

In the 1943-1944 school year, the school had 446 students, including 56 girls, from Kosovo, Montenegro, and Macedonia. The school had eight classes, and the curriculum included various subjects such as Albanian language, Latin, Italian, German, history, geography, mathematics, natural sciences, pedagogy, agriculture, moral education, didactics, and music.

The Prishtina Normal School played a crucial role in the education and training of Albanian teachers in the region. It contributed to the development of Kosovo's educational system and became an important educational, cultural, and patriotic center.

After its closure in 1945, the Prishtina Normal School reopened in Gjakovë in 1946 as a professional pedagogical school with a dormitory. In 1953, it was transferred to Pristina and became a five-year school with instruction in both Albanian and Serbian.

The school was home to and employed notable figures such as Tajar Hatipi, Beqir Kastrati, Jashar Rexhepagiq, Pajazit Nushi, Ditar Qamili, Nexhat Ibrahimi, and Ahmet Mumxhiu. Its principals included Kemal Deva, Salih Nushi, and Ditar Qamili.

In 1974, the Prishtina Normal School ceased to exist and was transformed into a pedagogical academy. Nevertheless, its contribution to the education of new generations of teachers and the development of Albanian culture and education in Kosovo is undeniable. Intellectuals, writers, and prominent figures such as Rexhep Qosja, Azem Shkreli, Ukshin Hoti, etc. graduated from this school.

== See also ==
- Education in Kosovo
- Higher Pedagogical School of Pristina
