= University of Mitrovica =

Public university in Mitrovica, Kosovo

- Universiteti i Mitrovicës
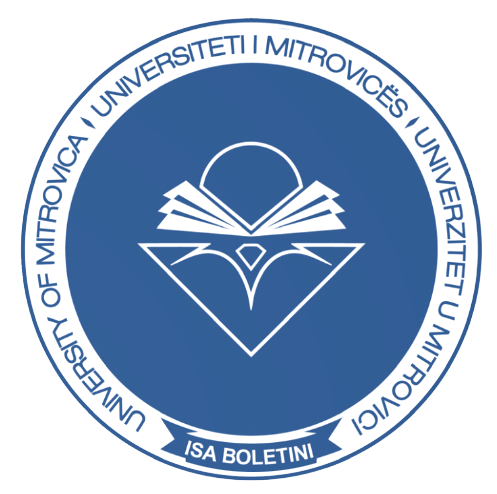
- Former name: Fakulteti i shkencave të aplikuara teknike
- Motto: E ardhmja e sigurtë
- Motto in English: "A safe future"
- Type: Public
- Established: 2013
- Rector: Prof. dr. Alush Musaj
- Academic staff: 147
- Administrative staff: 50
- Students: 4,000
- Location: Mitrovica, Kosovo; 42.888812°N 20.881440°E
- Campus: Urban
- Language: Albanian
- Colours: White and Blue
- Website: www.umib.net

The University of Mitrovica "Isa Boletini" (UMIB; Albanian: Universiteti i Mitrovicёs "Isa Boletini", UMIB) is a public university located in the city of Mitrovica, Kosovo.

== History ==
The foundations of higher education studies in Mitrovica were set with the opening of the Higher Technical School in 1961. In 1970 the Faculty of Engineering opened branches of Mining, Technology and Metallurgy, initially in Mitrovica, school year 1970/71, to continue then in Pristina until the establishment of the Faculty of Mining and Metallurgy in Mitrovica in 1974. Based on the 60 year tradition of higher education in Mitrovica, the Government of the Republic of Kosovo on 06.03.2013 has established the Public University of Mitrovica and the Kosovo Assembly on May 31, 2013 ratified the decision. Based on the 60 year tradition of higher education in Mitrovica, the Government of the Republic of Kosovo on 06.03.2013 has established the Public University of Mitrovica and the Kosovo Assembly on May 31, 2013 ratified the decision. Approved by the Ministry of Education, Science and Technology, at the University of Mitrovica "Isa Boletini" (UMIB) operate six faculties:

The students who studied at the Faculty of Mining and Metallurgy and the Technical High School were from all parts of Kosovo, considering that these branches were only studied in Mitrovica. A large number of students came from other Albanian areas, from Macedonia and Presevo, Bujanovac and Medvedja and Montenegro. Many foreign students were enrolled and graduated from this faculty, especially from the Middle East.

Based on these faculties and based on the tradition of over 60 years of higher education in Mitrovica, the Government of the Republic of Kosovo on March 6, 2013, established the Public University of Mitrovica, while the Kosovo Assembly on 31 May 2013 has ratified the decision. According to the Provisional Statute, approved by the Ministry of Education, Science and Technology, within the University of Mitrovica "Isa Boletini" (UMIB) there are six faculties: Faculty of Geosciences (FGJT), Faculty of Food Technology (FTU), Faculty of Mechanical Engineering and Computer Engineering (FIMK), Faculty of Law (FJ), Faculty of Economics (FE) and Faculty of Education (FE).

Within these faculties, there are a total of 23 study programs at bachelor and master level. A total of 69 teachers and assistants in regular working engagement are engaged in the teaching process. Of these, 53 are Doctor of Science and 15 are under a master or master's degree, according to the calls: 15 regular professors, 14 associate professors, 21 assistant professors, 4 lecturers, and 15 assistants.

== The organizational structure of UMIB ==
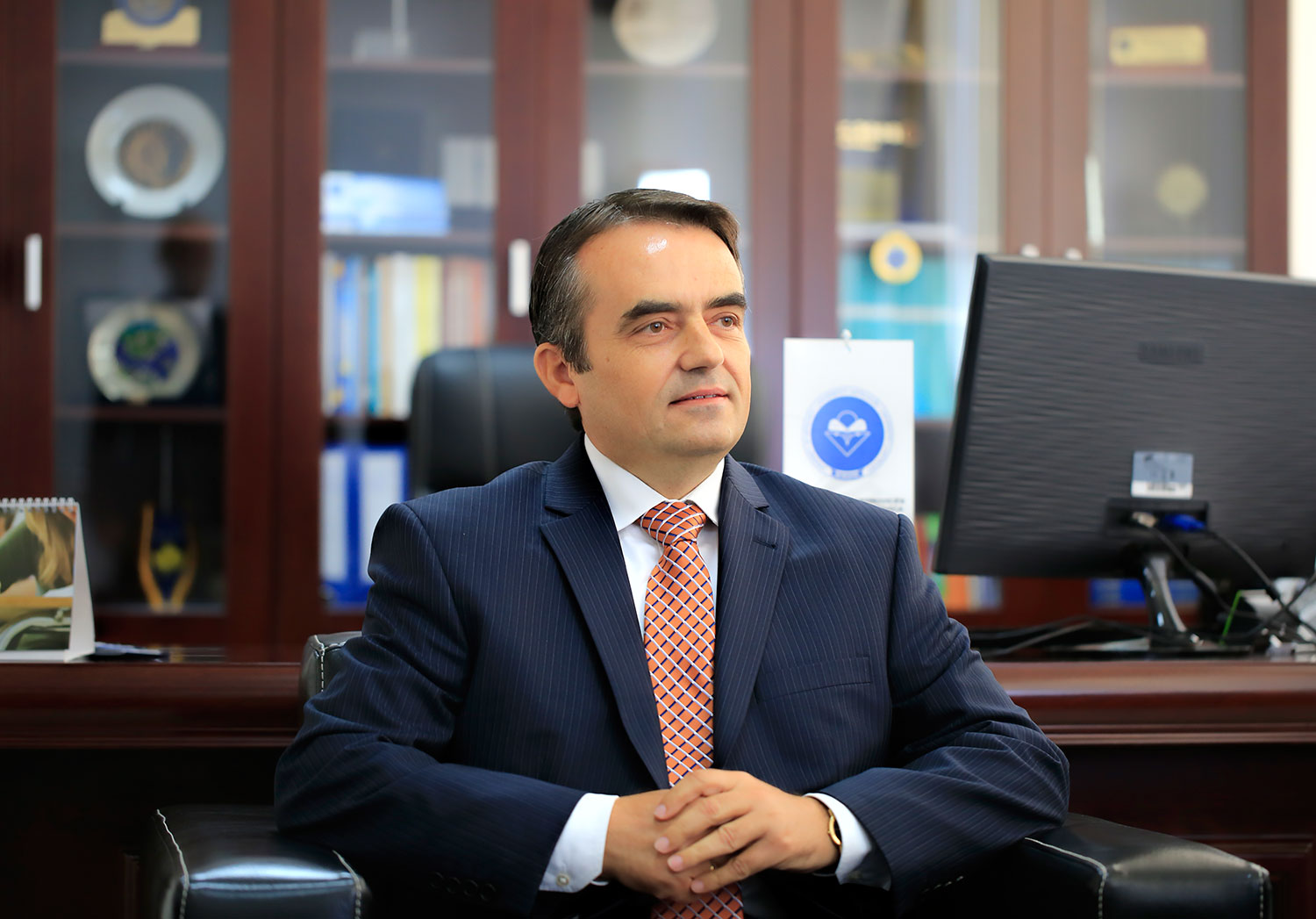
The rector of the University of Mitrovica "Isa Boletini"

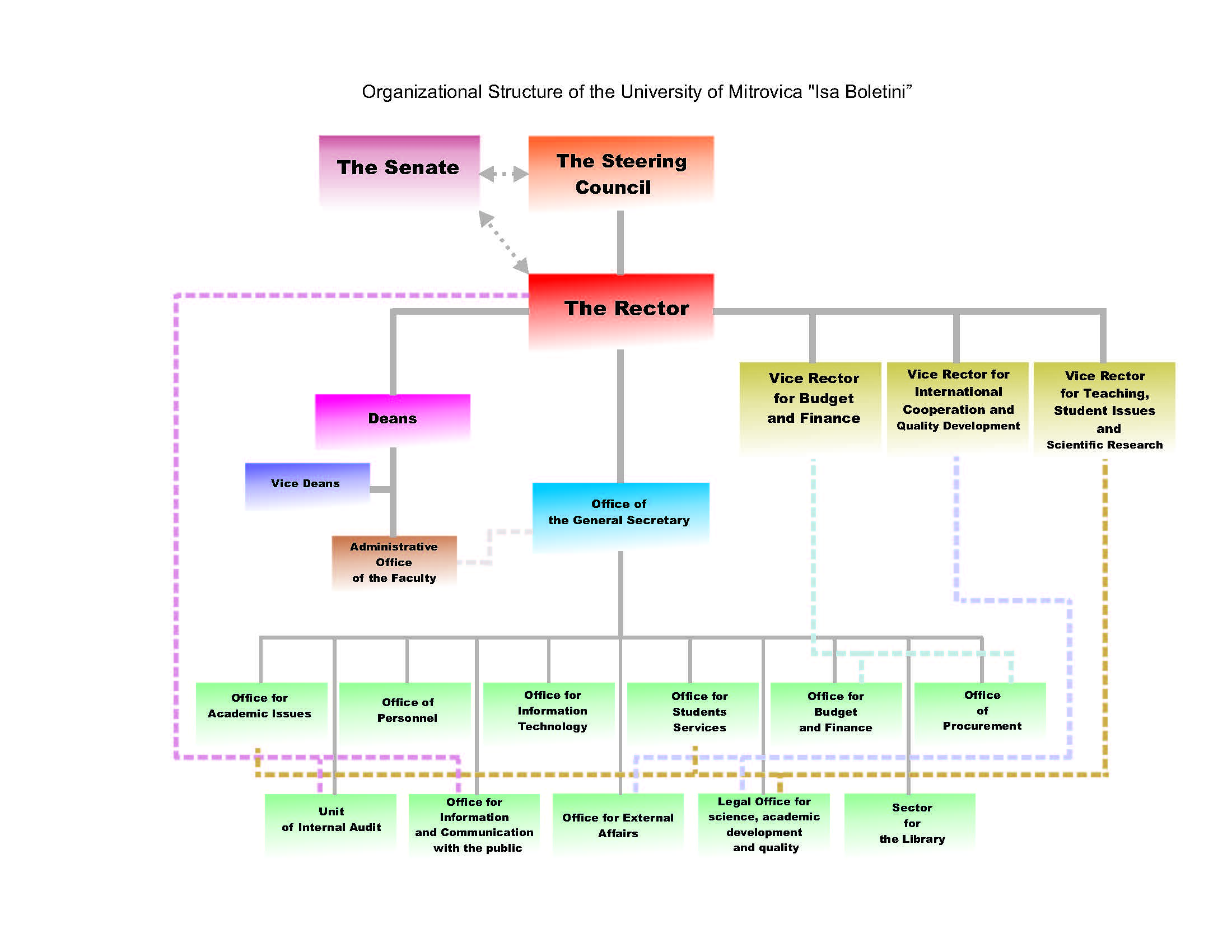
The organizational hierarchy of the University of Mitrovica "Isa Boletini"

== Organisation ==
The founding of the University of Mitrovica was part of a wider Kosovo government initiative to facilitate access through higher education throughout Kosovo. This initiative included the opening of universities besides the University of Pristina in Prizren, Peja, Mitrovica and Gjilan.

The programs were all accredited by KAA in 2012.

Before the opening of the University of Mitrovica, Mitrovica already hosted the Faculty of Applied Technical Sciences of the University of Pristina (FATS).

FATS cooperated with the German TU Bergakademie Freiberg and the Hochschule Ruhr West.

The Rector of the University of Mitrovica is Mr. Alush Musaj. In the academic year 2014/15 the University of Mitrovica had 2700 students enrolled, with who have worked 80 professors and assistants full-time, and 105 part times.

The cornerstone for the new building for the existing faculties in Mitrovica was laid at 26.12.2012.

== Faculties ==
=== Faculty of Geosciences (FG) ===
- Bachelor of Science:

- Mining(with specializations: Mining, Geotechnical, Preparation of mineral raw materials)
- Geology
- Materials and Metallurgy (with specializations: Materials, Metallurgy)

- Master of Science:

- Mining(with specializations: Geotechnics, Mining)
- Deposits of mineral raw materials
- Hydrology and Engineering Geology
- Materials
- Metallurgy

==== Brief History of the Faculty of Geosciences ====
The foundations of the Mining, Technology, and Metallurgy studies were set up with the opening of the Technical High School in Mitrovica in 1961.

In 1970, within the Technical Faculty, branches of Mining, Technology, and Metallurgy were opened, initially in Mitrovica, in the academic year 1970/71, to continue in Pristina until the foundation of the Faculty of Geosciences and Technology in Mitrovica in 1974.

The Faculty of Geosciences and Technology in Mitrovica was established by the Law on Establishment of the Faculty of Geosciences and Technology by the Assembly of Kosovo on July 22, 1974. In the year of establishment, the Faculty had three branches: Mining, Technology, and Metallurgy. In this year in all three branches were registered, 322 Albanian students.

In the academic year 1980/81, the branch of Geology was opened and 151 Albanian students were registered in this branch.

Within the Faculty, in 1978, the Institute for Technology Research, Mining, and Metallurgy were established. The Institute of the Faculty functioned until 1991 when the Albanian teachers and students of the Faculty were forcibly evicted by the then Serbian regime. In 2007, at the proposal of the Faculty, the Steering Council, based on the provisions of the Statute of UP, established the Institute for Mining, Metallurgy, and Materials, Technology and Geology.

Since 2001, the Faculty of Geosciences and Technology has been organizing studies according to the programs approved by the Senate of the University of Prishtina supported by the Bologna Declaration.

Faculty of Food Technology (FFT) - Bachelor of Science:

- Food Technology and Engineering
- Technology (with specializations: Environmental Engineering, Chemical Engineering)

- Master of Science:

- Food Technology and Engineering
- Technology (with specializations: Environmental Engineering, Chemical Engineering)

==== A brief history of FFT ====
The establishment of the Faculty of Food Technology is related to the opening of the Technical High School in 1961. It was the only school of its kind in Kosovo, then called the Autonomous Province of Kosovo and Metohija. Engineers for mining, metallurgy, and technology were trained in this school. The studies lasted two years. In 1970, within the Technical Faculty of Pristina opened the branches of Technology, Mining, and Metallurgy, initially in Mitrovica, the academic year 1970/71, to continue in Prishtina until the establishment of the Faculty of Mining and Metallurgy in Mitrovica. With the decision of the Assembly of the Autonomous Socialist Province of Kosovo, on 22 July 1974, the Faculty of Mining and Metallurgy in Mitrovica was established. In the Technical High School, existing directions, Mining, Metallurgy and Technology are cleared, but the directions of the Machinery and Electrotechnics are opened. Within the Faculty of Mining and Metallurgy, in 1978, a research institute for technology, mining, and metallurgy was established. Since the academic year, 1980/81 studies are also organized in the Geology branch. From the academic year 2001/2002, the Faculty of Mining and Metallurgy studies are organized according to the plan and programs approved by the Senate of the University of Prishtina supported by the Bologna Declaration, at two levels, Bachelor and Master.

=== Faculty of Mechanical and Computer Engineering (FMCE) - Bachelor of Science: ===
- Industrial Machinery
- Informatics Engineering
- Economics Engineering

- Master of Science:

- Production Technology
- Engineering Informatics

==== A brief history of FMCE ====
The Faculty of Mechanical and Computer Engineering is a continuation of the Faculty of Applied Technical Sciences at the same time the former High Technical School in Mitrovica, which opened in 1961 and was financially supported by Trepça. The High Technical School in Mitrovica was established with the decision of the Executive Council of Kosovo no. 2671 dated 10 May 1961, Kosovo's official gazette no. 25/61. In the first year, 42 regular students and 32 correspondents were enrolled. First Graduate Engineers graduated in June 1963. The Faculty of Applied Technical Sciences in Mitrovica was a continuation of the former High School of Engineering in Mitrovica transformed under the Decision of the Steering Council of the University of Prishtina no. 5/229 of 05.09.2005. In the academic year 1991/92, 80 new students were admitted to the former Technical High School (THS) in the first year, 40 students in the machinery branch and 40 in the Electrotechnical branch.

While in the second year there were 140 students in both directions. In the academic year 1993/94, according to the Decree Law on Higher Education in Kosovo, the former School harmonized and approved the School Statute and all normative acts, creating the legal conditions for the transformation of the school. In this year, the former School Committee commissions proposed the School Curriculum, where the 4-semester transformations took place in 5 semesters and new branches were opened: Telecommunication and Informatics, Energy, Manufacturing Machinery, and Thermo Energetics, which were approved by the Council Teaching and Senate of the University of Prishtina. With the adoption of the Law on Higher Education by the Assembly of Kosovo on 12.05.2003, the Senate of the University of Prishtina on 05.07.2004 approved the statute of the University, which foresees that in the one-year period the former High Schools be transformed into Faculty of Applied Technical Sciences. High Technical School, transformed into the Faculty of Applied Technical Sciences with the Departments: Industrial Machinery and Engineering Informatics.

=== Faculty of Law (FL) ===
- Law - Graduated Jurist - Bachelor

=== Faculty of Economics (FE) ===
- Bachelor of Arts:

- Banking, Finance and Accounting
- Informatics and Management

==== A brief history of FE ====
The foundations of studies at the Faculty of Economics were set up with the opening of the University of Mitrovica "Isa Boletini" in Mitrovica on 06.03.2013. Given the indispensable need for organization and development of higher education according to the standards and criteria of European Universities and beyond, the Faculty of Economics in Mitrovica within the "Isa Boletini" University in Mitrovica proposes the model of reformed studies according to plans and programs based on the recommendations of the Bologna Declaration.

The Faculty of Economics within the University of Mitrovica "Isa Boletini" (UMIB) started its work in the academic year 2013-14 in two directions: Banking Finance and Accounting; Management and Informatics as the academic unit of the UP in Prishtina. Whereas, in the academic year 2014-15, it started as an independent academic unit within the UMIB.

The Faculty of Economics, for the academic year 2015-16 received regular students in two directions: Banking, Finance, and Accounting as well as Management and Informatics, for 220 locations where 200 seats were for students from Kosovo, 10 for communities, and 10 for: Presevo, Bujanovac, Montenegro, Albania and Macedonia.

From the academic year 2015-16 the Faculty of Economics organized the studies according to the curricula approved by the Senate of the University of Mitrovica "Isa Boletini" based on the Bologna Declaration, whereby the Accreditation Agency accredited all the faculty curricula in Bachelor studies ( for both departments: Bank, Finance and Accounting and Management and Informatics).

=== Faculty of Education (FE) ===
- Pre-school Education Bachelor
- Primary Education Bachelor

== See also ==
- Mitrovica, Kosovo
- Kosovo
- University of Pristina
