= Zef Mirdita =

Kosovan historian from Prizren

- Born: 13 March 1936; Prizren, Kosovo
- Died: 4 April 2016 (aged 80); Zagreb, Croatia
- Known for: Albanian historian University professor Academic

Zef Mirdita (13 March 1936 – 4 April 2016) was a Kosovan Albanian historian, university professor and academic. He has made a significant contribution to the fields of Illyrology and Balkan studies.

== Biography ==
Zef Mirdita was born in Prizren, where he completed his primary education, classical high school in Pazin and Zagreb, while he studied at the Catholic Faculty of Theology in Zagreb (1965). In 1966, he returned to his hometown as a professor at the high school in Prizren, where he taught history, sociology and French. He was engaged at the University of Pristina for the Latin language for students of history and Albanology, while in 1967 he was appointed assistant in the history department of the Faculty of Philosophy of the University of Pristina.

In 1972, he defended his doctoral thesis at the University of Zagreb and specialized at the Sapienza University of Rome and then at Heidelberg University (1976-1977) and LMU Munich (1991-1992), Germany. In 1983, he was elected a full professor at the University of Pristina. He was a member of the National Committee of Yugoslavia (1980-1990) for Balkanology and a member of the Kosovo editorial board for the Encyclopedia of Yugoslavia. In 1991, he was elected a corresponding member of the Academy of Sciences and Arts of Kosovo.

In 1993, Mirdita left Kosovo and continued his scientific activity in Croatia, as a scientific advisor at the Institute of History (1993–1997) and then as a lecturer of ancient history at the University of Osijek, Croatia (1997–2007). He participated in many scientific congresses and lectured in several university centers as a guest professor. He is the author of a number of publications and numerous scientific studies. He is the bearer of a number of recognitions and decorations for his contribution to the field of science.

== Selected publications ==
- Studime dardane (Dardanian Studies), 1979 OCLC 33980591
- (in Albanian) Antroponomia e Dardanisë në kohën romake & (in German) Die Anthroponymie der Dardanien zur Römerzeit, 1981 OCLC 492318725
- Mitet dhe mitologjia në antikë (Myths and mythology in antiquity), 1988 OCLC 440782288
- Historia e kishës në popullin shqiptar (The history of the church in the Albanian people), 1994
- Krishterimi ndër shqiptarët (Christianity among Albanians), 1998 OCLC 745474466
- Religjioni dhe kultet e dardanëve dhe Dardanisë në antikë (The religion and cults of the Dardanians and Dardania in antiquity), 2001 OCLC 314577321
- (in Croatian) Vlasi u historiografiji (Vlachs in historiography), 2004 OCLC 447519232
- (in Croatian) Dardanci i Dardanija u antici (Dardanians and Dardania in antiquity, 2016 ISBN 9789537840440

== Awards ==
- Croatia: Annual award from the Croatian Academy of Sciences and Arts (2004)
- Albania: Medal of Gratitude, Decoration for contribution in Albanology from President of Albania (2004)
- Kosovo: Scientist of the year Ministry of Education, Science and Technology (Kosovo) (2011)
- Kosovo: Presidential Medal of Merits (2015)

== See also ==
- Illyria
- Balkan studies
- Kingdom of Dardania
