= Ali Podrimja =

Albanian poet

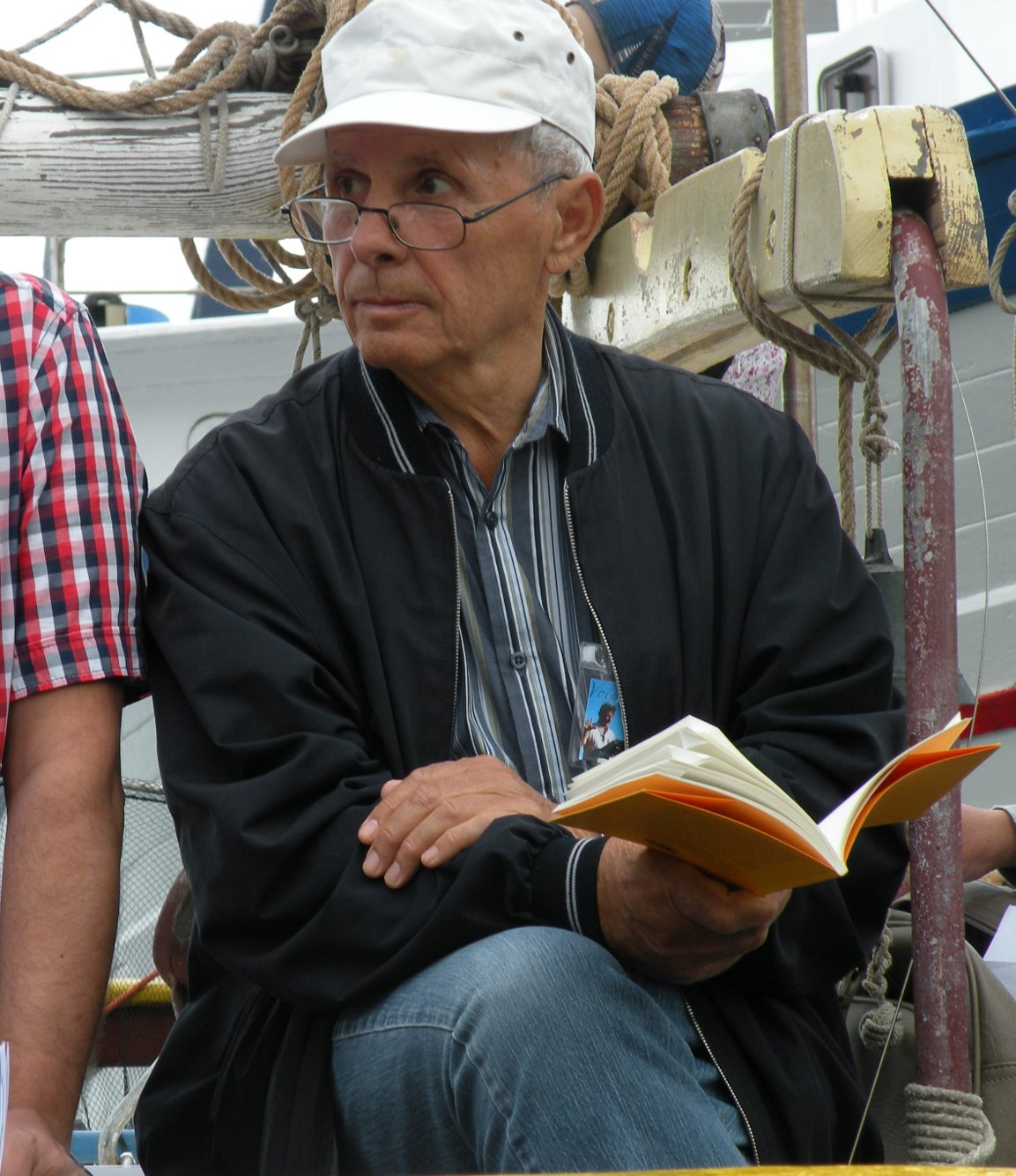
- Born: 28 August 1942; Gjakova, disputed between Italy and Kingdom of Yugoslavia
- Died: 21 July 2012 (aged 69); Lodève, France
- Education: University of Pristina
- Occupations: Poet, author
- Writing career
- Notable awards: Nikolaus Lenau Prize; 1999

Ali Podrimja (28 August 1942 – 21 July 2012) was an Albanian poet. He was born in Gjakova, at the time part of Italian-controlled Albania under Italy (present-day Kosovo).

On 21 July 2012, French police notified Kosovar authorities about the discovery of Podrimja's deceased body. Podrimja had not been in touch with his family for several days.

== Sources ==
- Albanian literature from Robert Elsie
