= Radivoje Papović =

Radivoje Papović (Serbian Cyrillic: Радивоје Паповић) was the Rector of the University of Pristina, in Kosovo, for most time part of Yugoslavia, during the 1991–1998, and 2004–2006 periods.

On 16 January 1997, he was seriously injured in a car bomb attack blamed on the Kosovo Liberation Army. A KLA member, Nait Hasani, was convicted of the bombing and sentenced to 22 years imprisonment. He was released from his jail in Serbia in March 2002.
