= List of universities in Kosovo =

This is a list of universities in Kosovo.

== Public universities ==
- University of Gjilan "Kadri Zeka" in Gjilan (Albanian: Universiteti i Gjilanit "Kadri Zeka")
- Haxhi Zeka University in Peja (Albanian: Universiteti "Haxhi Zeka" i Pejës)
- University of Gjakova "Fehmi Agani"
- University of Pristina in Pristina
- University of Prizren in Prizren
- University of Priština in North Mitrovica
- University of Mitrovica in Mitrovica
- University of Applied Sciences in Ferizaj in Ferizaj
- IBC-M International Business College Mitrovica

== Private universities ==
- European University of Kosovo
- AAB College
- RIT Kosovo
- European College Dukagjini
- Iliria College
- University for Business and Technology
- Universum College
