= European College Dukagjini =

Private higher education institution in Kosovo

The European College Dukagjini (Albanian: Kolegji Evropian Dukagjini), formerly known as European Vision University, is an institution of higher education in Kosovo.
