= Education in Kosovo =

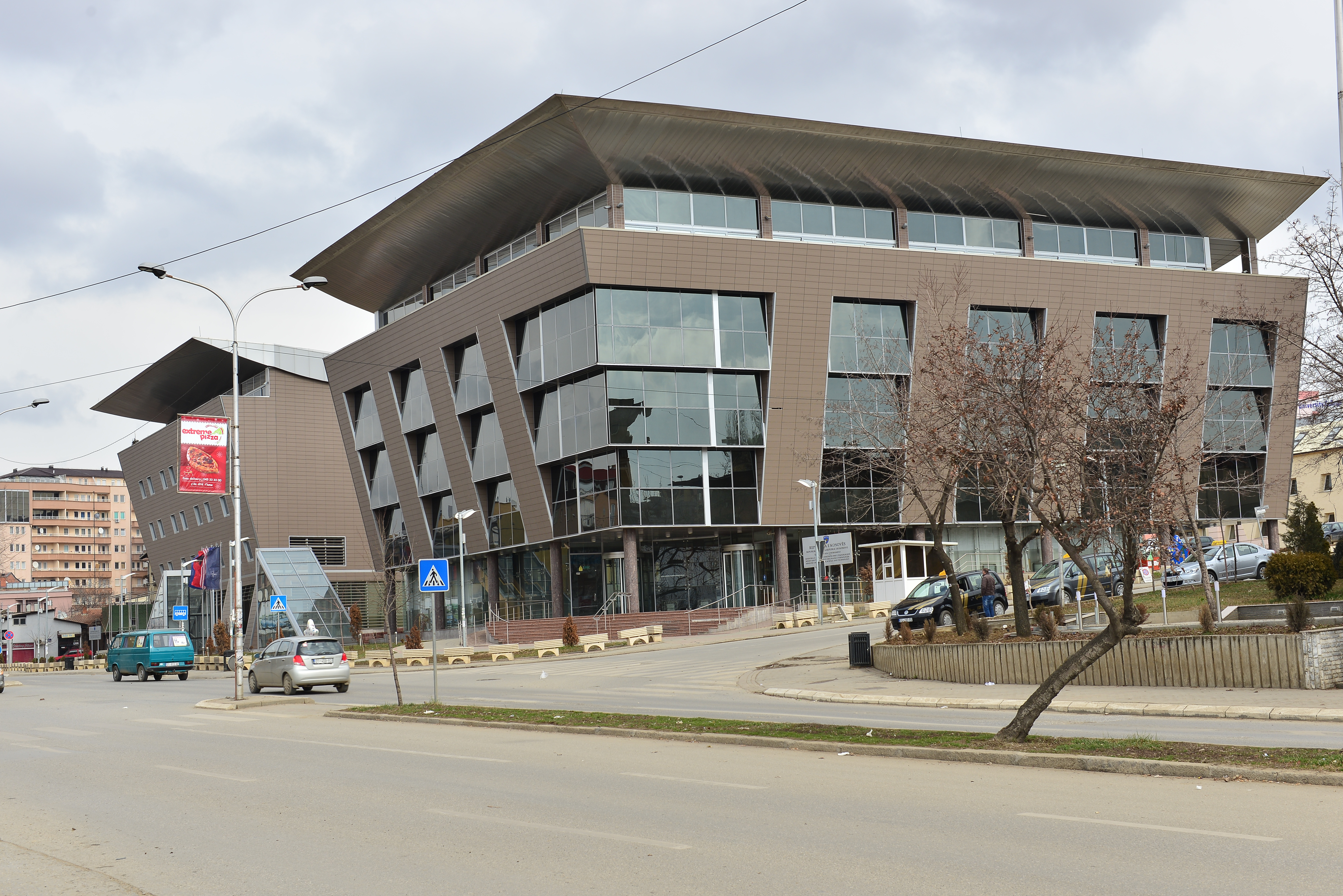
The Ministry of Education of Kosovo in the capital Pristina

Education in Kosovo is carried out in public and private institutions. Starting from 1999, education in Kosovo was subject to reforms at all levels: from preschool education up to university level. These reforms aimed at adjusting the education in Kosovo according to European and global contemporary standards. As a first step of this new system is considered the establishment of the Department of Education and Science (DES), which is followed with the creation of legal and professional infrastructure, which should facilitate the fundamental reformation of the education (system 5 + 4 + 3–4 in the general and professional education as well as Bologna agreement for high education), and the establishment of the Ministry of Education, Science and Technology (MEST) in March 2002. During this period the private education system began to develop.

The national institutions of education in Kosovo are governed by the Ministry of Education, Science and Technology.

== History ==
Among the first schools known in Kosovo were those opened during the Ottoman period—that is before 1912. Albanians were allowed to attend these schools, most of which were religious, with only few of them being secular. During 1913, in Prishtina, few Serbian-language primary schools and gymnasiums were opened. The period that followed the Ottoman rule, between 1916 and 1918 was also important for the educational system in Kosovo. During this period, Prishtina, along with other municipalities such as Ferizaj and Prizren, was occupied by Bulgaria. Bulgarian occupier did not allow Albanian-language schools, however because of the positive impact of the Austro-Hungarians in the Bulgarian area, some religious catholic schools were allowed in Pristina and other municipalities occupied by them. In 1916, the Bulgarian National Gymnasium was opened in Pristina. The situation in terms of education was worse in the region under the rule of Bulgaria compared to the region occupied by Austro-Hungarian forces where 300 Albanian-language schools were allowed to be opened.

During 1919–1939 in Yugoslavia, all Albanian-language schools were closed and education was allowed only in Serbo-Croatian. Around four (4) percent of Yugoslav people attended secondary education, with rural areas being the regions with the lowest numbers of participants since access to schools was almost nonexistent. During this period, the most marginalized group who was deprived from attending schools were girls coming from Muslim families.

During the World War II Kosovo joined with Albania under Italian occupation. This marked a positive turn in the educational system in Kosovo since schools in Albanian were allowed to be opened. Besides hundreds of primary schools opened in Pristina, the first high school in Albanian in this municipality, Sami Frasheri, was also founded. After the World War II, Kosovo was again part of Yugoslavia. During this period, ethnic Albanians were recognized as a national minority and Albanian was accepted and Albanian-language primary schools were allowed while higher levels of education were offered still only in Serbo-Croatian. In 1968, the constitution was amended to allow the opening of Albanian-language schools at all levels. After WWII, education in Kosovo was provided in three languages: Serbian, Albanian, and Turkish, while after 1953 lessons in these three languages were offered in the same school.

After 1968, the foundation of Albanian-language educational institutions continued. In 1969, the Albanian University of Pristina was opened. Texts and teaching materials were imported from Albania, as part of an agreement between the University of Tirana and that of Pristina in 1970. In 1981, the University of Pristina consisted of 75 per cent ethnic Albanians out of the 47,000 students attending it. During the late 70s and early 80s the economic situation in Kosovo and Yugoslavia was worsening. Furthermore, negative discrimination of students based on ethnicity led Albanian students of the University of Pristina to organize a massive protest on March 11, 1981, known as the Student Protests of 1981. As a result of violent student riots, restrictions in the education of Albanians were imposed again. As a result of this protest, the previous agreement between Albania and Kosovo, to exchange educational materials, ended and Serbo-Croatian books started to be translated in Albanian to fulfil the needs of the university. Further, students, teachers and professors who participated in these protests were expelled, thus resulting in more than 260 students and more than 210 teachers/professors expelled.

During the period of abolition of Kosovo's autonomy (1989–1990), education in Kosovo faced further changes. A new curriculum concentrated more in covering Serbian culture and history and that made Serbo-Croatian a compulsory subject in Kosovo high schools was adopted in 1990. Further, students who wanted to enter secondary schools had to pass a Serbian language test. As a result, after 1992, there were left only Albanian-language elementary schools while in secondary schools and Pristina University Serbian was the only language of instruction.

In the 1990s, Kosovars established a parallel education system as a temporary solution to the situation created during that period. Around 300–450,000 students boycotted the state educational institutions and attended the parallel Albanian-language private schools. For a period of more than six years, Albanian-Kosovar students attended parallel primary and secondary schools and were unable to attend university as they were neither allowed to enter nor attend the University of Pristina. These private/parallel schools were located in mosques, private houses, garages, etc.

On September 1, 1996, President of Serbia, Milošević and Kosovar leader, Rugova signed the Milošević-Rugova education agreement that would allow ethnic Albanian students and teachers to return to schools. However, this agreement was never implemented and this led to protest held between October 1997 and January 1998. Again, during these protests a number of the students were arrested and beaten by the police. On March 23, 1998, another agreement was signed that allowed Albanian students to return to schools and in the University of Pristina. However, this agreement did not allow the integration of Albanian students and pupils with the Serbian ones. To maintain this, a shift schedule was applied so that Serb students attended the lectures in the morning and Albanians in the afternoon. In response to this agreement and as a way to show their disagreement, Serb students and professors at the University of Pristina organized a protest where 10,000 people were gathered.

== Educational system in Kosovo ==
=== Preschool education ===
The preschool education system is divided into three levels: Kindergarten (for children of 1–2 years of age), Kindergarten (for children of 3–4 years of age) and Preprimary class (for children of 5 years of age).

=== Primary and low secondary education ===
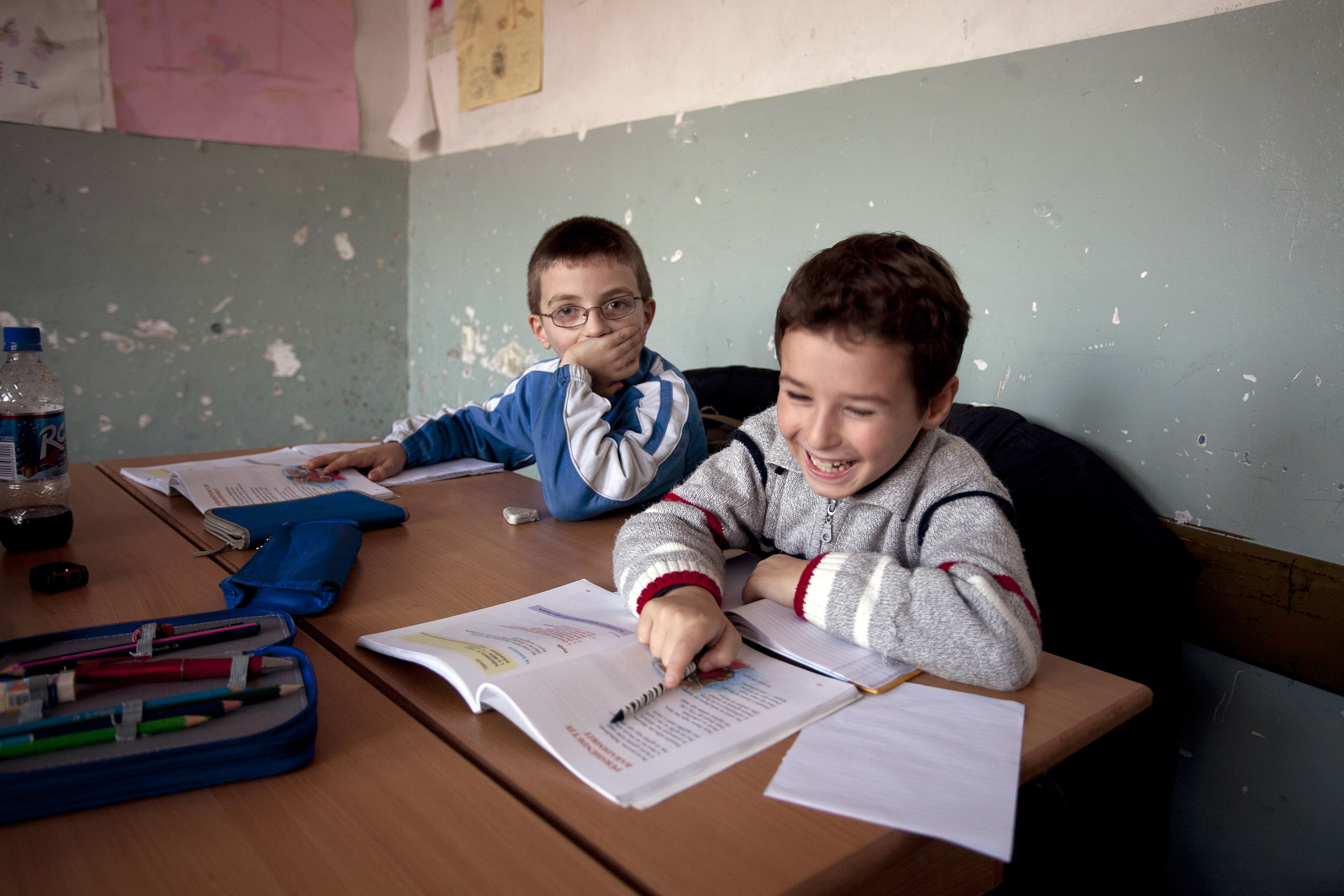
Children studying in a primary school in Gjakova

According to the law on primary and secondary education in Kosovo the primary education (1–5) and low secondary education is mandatory for everyone. The mandatory education begins when the child reaches 6 years of age (the minimal age of mandatory education). According to this law, the education in the publicly funded educational institutions is free of charge. The low secondary education is the second phase of mandatory education which includes classes 6–9, generations 12 to 15 years of age, respectively. The education in primary schools in Kosovo is held in five languages: Albanian, Serbian, Bosnian, Turkish, and Croatian.

=== High secondary education, gymnasiums, and professional schools ===
The high secondary education is organized in the general and professional education. The high secondary education lasts 3 or 4 years depending on the educational curricula designed by the MEST. All students are entitled to pursue this level on voluntary basis. The high secondary education is divided into two categories: the general and professional education. The main goal of the secondary professional education, which includes professional schools, is to prepare the students for labor market, but it also offers possibilities of applying for higher post-secondary or university studies. This type of education is organized in eight types of schools, where the classes are held in several profiles.

=== Special education ===
In accordance with the law on education, the rights to special education in Kosovo have those children that don't have or are not able to have normal education. In Kosovo there are total of 7 schools for special education and 64 adjoining classes. The classes are held in regular schools.

=== International Schools ===
In Kosovo, there are International Schools, such as the Finnish School of Kosovo, and the International Learning Group.

=== Higher education ===
Higher education is available of attaining in various universities and different educational institutions offering high professional education. Higher education is available of attaining in various universities and different educational institutions offering high professional education. Higher education is also available in public or private institutions, such as the University of Pristina as a public university and AAB College as a private university, where students are offered associate degrees, bachelor's degrees, master's degrees, and PhDs. . Various schedules are additionally available where students can choose to pursue their studies full-time or part-time.

Various alternations were brought by the network of high education institutions where a range of legal standards were adjusted for such institutions to develop. The standards and norms of higher education in Kosovo are supported by European standards as the platform on the development of the higher education system was based on the process of Bologna's objectives.

The Ministry of Education, Science, and Technology has created the Kosovo Accreditation Agency (KAA) in accordance with Kosovo's law on higher education, with the aim of assessing the appropriate quality in the higher education private and public institutions.

5,500+ participants took part in exchanges between the EU and Kosovo in the areas of education, training, youth, and sport under ERASMUS+ (2014–2020).

== See also ==
- List of universities in Kosovo
- Pedagogical Institute of Kosovo
