= 2007 Kosovan local elections =

Municipal elections were held in Kosovo on November 17, 2007, at the same time as elections to the Assembly of Kosovo, with a second round for the mayoral elections held on 2007-12-08. The date was originally set for September 1, 2007 by the Special Representative of the Secretary-General of the United Nations, Joachim Rücker (head of the United Nations Interim Administration Mission in Kosovo).

The elections were held in all of Kosovo's municipalities, and, for the first time, local mayors were directly elected.

Joachim Rücker decided not to officially recognise the election results in mainly Serb-populated municipalities where Albanians were elected due to the Serb election boycott.

== Main contenders ==
Three Kosovo Serb lists registered for the election very early:

- Multi-Ethnic Council of Plemetin
- Kosovo Movement
- Civil Initiative for Novo Brdo and Zubin Potok

In total, 50 lists participated the elections. Many of the lists participating in the local elections were Serbian, as opposed to the parliamentary elections, where only eight Serbian lists participated.

== Alliances ==
The Democratic Party of Kosovo, which won the Assembly election, and the New Kosovo Alliance agreed in early December 2007, prior to the second round of the elections, to form coalitions at the local level wherever possible.

== Results ==
The results of the mayoral elections in the thirty municipalities were as follows:

- Democratic Party of Kosovo (PDK): 17 mayors
- Democratic League of Kosovo (LDK): 7 mayors
- Alliance for the Future of Kosovo (AAK): 3 mayors

Due to the Kosovan Serbs' election boycott, no run-off election was held in Leposavić, Zubin Potok and Zvečan.

According to the final results, party control of the municipal councils is as follows:

- Democratic Party of Kosovo (PDK): 14 municipal council presidents
- Democratic League of Kosovo (LDK): 6 municipal council presidents
- Alliance for the Future of Kosovo (AAK): 3 municipal council presidents

Turnout in the second round was 31%.

- Basic official results
- Detailed official results
- Preliminary run-off results

== Results by municipality ==
=== Gjakova District ===
==== Gjakova ====
Mayoral results
Candidate	Party	First round		Second round	
Candidate	Party	Votes	%	Votes	%
Pal Lekaj	Alliance for the Future of Kosovo	12,409	37.98	19,185	56.39
Astrit Haraqija	Democratic League of Kosovo	7,789	23.84	14,836	43.61
Teuta Sahatqija	ORA	3,723	11.39		
Besnik Bardhi	New Kosovo Alliance	3,481	10.65		
Besim Mehmeti	Democratic League of Dardania	2,465	7.54		
Agim Jaka	Democratic Party of Kosovo	1,012	3.10		
Mentor Rruka	Alternative for Gjakova	809	2.48		
Aqif Shehu (incumbent)	Aqif Shehu	571	1.75		
Marjan Oroshi	Democratic Christian Party for Integration	414	1.27		
Total		32,673	100.00	34,021	100.00

Municipal assembly results
Party	Votes	%	Seats
Alliance for the Future of Kosovo	7,285	23.91	10
Democratic League of Kosovo	5,625	18.47	8
New Kosovo Alliance	4,289	14.08	6
ORA	3,059	10.04	4
Albanian Christian Democratic Party of Kosovo	2,424	7.96	3
Democratic League of Dardania	2,218	7.28	3
Democratic Party of Kosovo	1,889	6.20	3
Democratic Christian Party for Integration	1,090	3.58	1
Alternative for Gjakova	944	3.10	1
New Democratic Initiative of Kosovo	739	2.43	1
National Movement for the Liberation of Kosovo	373	1.22	1
Justice Party	243	0.80	–
Ecological Party of Kosovo	214	0.70	–
Daut Thaqi	71	0.23	–
Total	30,463	100.00	41

==== Deçan ====
Mayoral results
Candidate	Party	First round		Second round	
Candidate	Party	Votes	%	Votes	%
Musa Berisha	Alliance for the Future of Kosovo	6,736	39.38	7,120	68.09
Blerim Bajraktaraj	Democratic League of Dardania	3,479	20.34	3,337	31.91
Sali Cacaj	Sali Cacaj	2,448	14.31		
Besim Sejfijaj	Democratic League of Kosovo	2,378	13.90		
Sylë Malaj	New Kosovo Alliance	778	4.55		
Baton Tahirsylaj	Democratic Party of Kosovo	684	4.00		
Selim Lokaj	Selim Lokaj	347	2.03		
Selmon Berisha	Balli Kombëtar	134	0.78		
Ismet Hebibi	Ismet Hebibi	119	0.70		
Total		17,103	100.00	10,457	100.00

Municipal assembly results
Party	Votes	%	Seats
Alliance for the Future of Kosovo	7,806	47.80	15
Democratic League of Dardania	3,401	20.83	6
Democratic League of Kosovo	2,961	18.13	6
New Kosovo Alliance	1,105	6.77	2
Democratic Party of Kosovo	904	5.54	2
Balli Kombëtar	94	0.58	–
National Movement for the Liberation of Kosovo	58	0.36	–
Total	16,329	100.00	31

==== Rahovec ====
Mayoral results
Candidate	Party	First round		Second round	
Candidate	Party	Votes	%	Votes	%
Qazim Qeska	Democratic Party of Kosovo	6,527	35.87	8,919	61.06
Nahit Elshani	Democratic League of Kosovo	4,082	22.43	5,689	38.94
Smajl Latifi	National Movement for the Liberation of Kosovo	3,718	20.43		
Enver Sylka	Alliance for the Future of Kosovo	1,916	10.53		
Esad Haxhijaha (incumbent)	Democratic League of Dardania	856	4.70		
Visar Korenica	New Kosovo Alliance	855	4.70		
Vahdet Kollari	ORA	244	1.34		
Total		18,198	100.00	14,608	100.00

Municipal assembly results
Party	Votes	%	Seats
Democratic Party of Kosovo	6,278	35.54	11
Democratic League of Kosovo	4,380	24.79	8
Alliance for the Future of Kosovo	2,696	15.26	5
National Movement for the Liberation of Kosovo	1,273	7.21	2
New Kosovo Alliance	1,163	6.58	2
Democratic League of Dardania	930	5.26	2
Justice Party	544	3.08	1
ORA	225	1.27	–
New Democratic Initiative of Kosovo	101	0.57	–
Rauf Morina	46	0.26	–
Serb People's Party	26	0.15	–
New Democracy	2	0.01	–
Strength of Serbia Movement for Kosovo and Metohija–Bogoljub Karić	1	0.01	–
Total	17,665	100.00	31

=== Mitrovica District ===
==== Mitrovica ====
Mayoral results
Candidate	Party	First round		Second round	
Candidate	Party	Votes	%	Votes	%
Bajram Rexhepi	Democratic Party of Kosovo	8,599	36.51	8,861	56.04
Sadri Ferati	Democratic League of Kosovo	5,628	23.90	6,950	43.96
Nexhmedin Spahiu	New Kosovo Alliance	5,437	23.08		
Mustafë Pllana	Democratic League of Dardania	1,704	7.23		
Nysret Maxhera	ORA	893	3.79		
Bahri Xhaferi	Alliance for the Future of Kosovo	724	3.07		
Shefqet Ibrahimi	Justice Party	317	1.35		
Faruk Mujka	Ecological Party of Kosovo	251	1.07		
Total		23,553	100.00	15,811	100.00

Municipal assembly results
Party	Votes	%	Seats
Democratic Party of Kosovo	8,289	36.30	15
New Kosovo Alliance	4,859	21.28	9
Democratic League of Kosovo	4,829	21.15	9
Democratic League of Dardania	1,789	7.83	3
Alliance for the Future of Kosovo	1,118	4.90	2
ORA	1,038	4.55	2
Justice Party	352	1.54	1
Turkish Democratic Party of Kosovo	154	0.67	–
PDAK	123	0.54	–
Ecological Party of Kosovo	112	0.49	–
Party of Democratic Action	71	0.31	–
Xhylazim Peci	44	0.19	–
Balli Kombëtar	40	0.18	–
Albanian Republican Party	11	0.05	–
Strength of Serbia Movement for Kosovo and Metohija	5	0.02	–
Total	22,834	100.00	41

==== Skenderaj ====
Mayoral results
Candidate	Party	Votes	%
Sami Lushtaku	Democratic Party of Kosovo	18,338	80.50
Fadil Geci	Democratic League of Dardania	2,842	12.48
Basri Lushtaku	New Kosovo Alliance	768	3.37
Rushit Haliti	Independent	424	1.86
Kemail Shaqiri	Alliance for the Future of Kosovo	407	1.79
Total		22,779	100.00

Municipal assembly results
Party	Votes	%	Seats
Democratic Party of Kosovo	20,003	86.22	27
Democratic League of Dardania	1,847	7.96	3
New Kosovo Alliance	709	3.06	1
Democratic League of Kosovo	235	1.01	–
Justice Party	177	0.76	–
ORA	132	0.57	–
Alliance for the Future of Kosovo	97	0.42	–
Total	23,200	100.00	31

==== Vushtrri ====
Mayoral results
Candidate	Party	First round		Second round	
Candidate	Party	Votes	%	Votes	%
Bajram Mulaku	Democratic Party of Kosovo	7,471	34.70	7,697	56.99
Muharrem Shabani (incumbent)	Civic Initiative "Democratic Union"	4,980	23.13	5,808	43.01
Hajzer Krasniqi	Democratic League of Kosovo	4,016	18.65		
Naim Azemi	New Kosovo Alliance	1,464	6.80		
Menderes Ibra	Alliance for the Future of Kosovo	1,270	5.90		
Lutfi Bilalli	Democratic League of Dardania	1,036	4.81		
Sabit Kadriu	Independent	660	3.07		
Abit Asllani	ORA	492	2.28		
Nexhat Sopjani	Albanian Republican Party	143	0.66		
Total		21,532	100.00	13,505	100.00

Municipal assembly results
Party	Votes	%	Seats
Democratic Party of Kosovo	7,765	38.66	13
Democratic League of Kosovo	4,603	22.92	7
New Kosovo Alliance	2,119	10.55	3
Civic Initiative "Democratic Union"	1,358	6.76	2
Alliance for the Future of Kosovo	1,137	5.66	2
Democratic League of Dardania	1,073	5.34	2
Justice Party	727	3.62	1
ORA	620	3.09	1
Union of Independent Social Democrats of Kosovo and Metohija	244	1.21	–
Sabit Kadriu	159	0.79	–
Turkish Democratic Party of Kosovo	132	0.66	–
PDAK	73	0.36	–
National Movement for the Liberation of Kosovo	37	0.18	–
New Democracy	15	0.07	–
Albanian Republican Party	14	0.07	–
Independent Liberal Party	5	0.02	–
Strength of Serbia Movement for Kosovo and Metohija	3	0.01	–
Total	20,084	100.00	31

==== Unrecognized results in predominantly Serb communities ====
The Serb community in northern Kosovo generally boycotted the 2007 local elections. Although elections were formally held and results certified for Leposavić, Zubin Potok, and Zvečan, the turnouts were extremely low, the outcomes were not recognized internationally or in the communities in question, and the winning candidates never took power. The Prishtina authorities ultimately chose to extend the mandates of the previously elected Serb mayors in these municipalities, a decision that the mayors in question dismissed as irrelevant.

===== Leposavić =====
Mayoral results
Candidate	Party	Votes	%
Nebojša Kostović	Civic Initiative "G17 Plus - Leposavić"	2	40.00
Tomislav Radosavljević	Civic Initiative "Together"	2	40.00
Srboljub Milićević	Movement for Sočanica	1	20.00
Svetomir Milojević	Civic Initiative "Work and Trust"	0	0.00
Total		5	100.00

Note: There was no second-round vote.

Municipal assembly results
Party	Votes	%	Seats
Democratic League of Dardania	24	85.71	13
Civic Initiative "G17 Plus - Leposavić"	1	3.57	1
Civic Initiative "Together"	1	3.57	1
Movement for Sočanica	1	3.57	1
Strength of Serbia Movement for Kosovo and Metohija - Bogoljub Karić	1	3.57	1
Civic Initiative "Work and Trust"	0	0.00	–
Party of Democratic Action	0	0.00	–
Total	28	100.00	17

===== Zubin Potok =====
Mayoral results
Candidate	Party	Votes	%
Rrustem Ferizi	Democratic Party of Kosovo	208	70.75
Aziz Hasani	New Kosovo Alliance	86	29.25
Total		294	100.00

Municipal assembly results
Party	Votes	%	Seats
Democratic League of Kosovo	226	47.68	8
Democratic Party of Kosovo	190	40.08	7
New Kosovo Alliance	54	11.39	2
Democratic League of Dardania	4	0.84	–
Total	474	100.00	17

===== Zvečan =====
Mayoral results
Candidate	Party	Votes	%
Desimir Petković	G17 Plus Zvečan	4	80.00
Miroljub Milentijević	Sokolovi	1	20.00
Total		5	100.00

Municipal assembly results
Party	Votes	%	Seats
Democratic League of Dardania	25	100.00	17
G17 Plus Zvečan	0	0.00	–
Zvečan Youth	0	0.00	–
Strength of Serbia Movement for Kosovo and Metohija–Bogoljub Karić	0	0.00	–
Sokolovi	0	0.00	–
Total	25	100.00	17

=== Peja District ===
==== Peja ====
Mayoral results
Candidate	Party	First round		Second round	
Candidate	Party	Votes	%	Votes	%
Ali Berisha	Alliance for the Future of Kosovo	8,203	23.00	18,068	67.63
Gazmend Muhaxheri	ORA	6,311	17.69	8,646	32.37
Hajredin Kuçi	Democratic Party of Kosovo	5,415	15.18		
Smajl Shala	Democratic League of Dardania	5,002	14.02		
Agim Bërdyna	Democratic League of Kosovo	4,798	13.45		
Sali Kelmendi	Sali Kelmendi	2,580	7.23		
Burim Basha	New Kosovo Alliance	2,417	6.78		
Sahudin Hysenaj	Justice Party	542	1.52		
Valdet Gashi	Valdet Gashi	401	1.12		
Total		35,669	100.00	26,714	100.00

Municipal assembly results
Party	Votes	%	Seats
Alliance for the Future of Kosovo	7,693	22.91	10
Democratic League of Kosovo	5,549	16.53	7
Democratic League of Dardania	5,162	15.38	6
Democratic Party of Kosovo	4,614	13.74	6
ORA	3,861	11.50	5
New Kosovo Alliance	3,089	9.20	4
New Democratic Initiative of Kosovo	586	1.75	1
Party of Democratic Action	566	1.69	1
Bosniak Initiative–Rustem Nurković	465	1.39	1
Civic Initiative Together–Peć	377	1.12	–
Democratic Christian Party for Integration	306	0.91	–
Vakat Coalition	237	0.71	–
Albanian Christian Democratic Party of Kosovo	220	0.66	–
Justice Party	217	0.65	–
National Movement for the Liberation of Kosovo	168	0.50	–
Feim Kurhasani	135	0.40	–
Balli Kombëtar	108	0.32	–
Independent Liberal Party	93	0.28	–
United Roma Party of Kosovo	57	0.17	–
Ramë Drashej	32	0.10	–
A Different Initiative	28	0.08	–
Strength of Serbia Movement for Kosovo and Metohija–Bogoljub Karić	9	0.03	–
Total	33,572	100.00	41

==== Istog ====
Mayoral results
Candidate	Party	First round		Second round	
Candidate	Party	Votes	%	Votes	%
Fadil Ferati (incumbent)	Democratic League of Kosovo	6,650	42.61	8,837	63.45
Idriz Blakaj	Democratic Party of Kosovo	3,802	24.36	5,090	36.55
Rifat Osmanaj	Democratic League of Dardania	2,642	16.93		
Hajzer Hajzeraj	New Kosovo Alliance	1,052	6.74		
Sadri Jahaj	Alliance for the Future of Kosovo	960	6.15		
Naser Shatri	Naser Shatri	392	2.51		
Ibrahim Shatri	ORA	110	0.70		
Total		15,608	100.00	13,927	100.00

Municipal assembly results
Party	Votes	%	Seats
Democratic League of Kosovo	5,268	35.18	11
Democratic Party of Kosovo	3,257	21.75	7
Democratic League of Dardania	2,622	17.51	5
Alliance for the Future of Kosovo	1,743	11.64	4
New Kosovo Alliance	951	6.35	2
New Democratic Initiative of Kosovo	283	1.89	1
Party of Democratic Action	254	1.70	1
Civic Initiative Together Istok	177	1.18	–
Naser Shatri	88	0.59	–
Justice Party	87	0.58	–
Albanian Christian Democratic Party of Kosovo	86	0.57	–
ORA	79	0.53	–
Vakat Coalition	79	0.53	–
Total	14,974	100.00	31

==== Klina ====
Mayoral results
Candidate	Party	First round		Second round	
Candidate	Party	Votes	%	Votes	%
Sokol Bashota	Democratic Party of Kosovo	4,578	31.70	7,356	57.92
Prenkë Gjetaj (incumbent)	Democratic League of Kosovo	4,013	27.79	5,344	42.08
Enver Berisha	Alliance for the Future of Kosovo	2,828	19.58		
Zenun Zeqa	Democratic League of Dardania	2,189	15.16		
Fadil Gashi	New Kosovo Alliance	394	2.73		
Rifat Morina	ORA	264	1.83		
Anton Shllaku	Albanian Christian Democratic Party of Kosovo	177	1.23		
Total		14,443	100.00	12,700	100.00

Municipal assembly results
Party	Votes	%	Seats
Democratic Party of Kosovo	4,761	33.80	10
Democratic League of Kosovo	3,237	22.98	7
Alliance for the Future of Kosovo	2,641	18.75	6
Democratic League of Dardania	1,602	11.37	4
Democratic Christian Party for Integration	494	3.51	1
Albanian Christian Democratic Party of Kosovo	491	3.49	1
New Kosovo Alliance	431	3.06	1
ORA	234	1.66	1
New Democratic Initiative of Kosovo	146	1.04	–
Strength of Serbia Movement for Kosovo and Metohija–Bogoljub Karić	46	0.33	–
Serb Civic Initiative Klina	2	0.01	–
Total	14,085	100.00	31

== Post-election developments ==
=== Junik ===
Junik, formerly part of Deçan, was upgraded from a pilot municipal unit to a full-fledged municipality in 2008. Tahir Isufaj of the Democratic League of Kosovo was recognized as mayor.
