= Muharrem Shabani =

Kosov politician (born 1949)

Muharrem Shabani (born 1949) is a politician in Kosovo. He served in the assembly of the Socialist Autonomous Province of Kosovo in 1989-90 and was a deputy speaker. He was prominent among a group of Albanian delegates that supported Kosovo becoming a republic within Yugoslavia and he played a key role in establishing a "parallel" assembly when the official parliament was shut down in July 1990. Shabani later served as the mayor of Vushtrri after the 1998–99 Kosovo War.

== Early life and career ==
Shabani was born to a Kosovo Albanian family in Vushtrri, in what was then the Autonomous Region of Kosovo and Metohija in the People's Republic of Serbia, Federal People's Republic of Yugoslavia. He graduated from the University of Pristina Faculty of Law and was president of the Vushtrri municipal court in the 1980s. (Note: In 2009, Kosovo's Express newspaper published an article with claims against Shabani that were later found to be false and defamatory. The Press Council of Kosovo's ruling in the matter confirms that Shabani was president of the municipal court in the 1980s.)

== Politician ==
=== Delegate in the Kosovo Assembly ===
Shabani became an appointed member of the Kosovo assembly in June 1989, shortly after Serbia introduced a new constitution that restricted the province's autonomy. He served as a deputy speaker. In 1990, Albanian representatives planned to introduce a motion declaring Kosovo a republic within Yugoslavia. When the Serbian government pre-emptively shut down the assembly, 114 Albanian delegates met in its courtyard to establish a parallel institution and approve the motion. Shabani read the declaration of Kosovo's republican status and later recounted concerns about the possibility of sniper fire from surrounding buildings. He left Kosovo due to the worsening political situation and lived in exile for most of the 1990s.

=== Mayor of Vushtrri ===
Shabani became politically active again in Vushtrri as a member of the Democratic League of Kosovo (LDK) after the Kosovo War. He appeared in the seventh position on the party's electoral list in the 2000 Kosovan local elections and received a mandate in the municipal assembly when the list won a majority victory with twenty out of thirty-one seats. He became mayor in late 2001 and was confirmed in office after the LDK won another a second consecutive majority victory in the 2002 local elections.

In 2004, Shabani promised representatives of the Vushtrri's Serb community that his government would reconstruct homes and religious sites destroyed in the 2004 unrest in Kosovo as soon as possible.

The LDK became divided into various factions after the death of its founder Ibrahim Rugova in 2006, and Shabani was among those who ultimately left the party. When Kosovo introduced the direct election of mayors in the 2007 local elections, he sought re-election as the leader of his own "Democratic Union" group. He was defeated in the second round of voting by Bajram Mulaku of the Democratic Party of Kosovo (PDK). (Note: Shabani also led the Democratic Union's list for the local assembly and would have at least have had the option of taking a seat after the list won two mandates. Online sources do not clarify if he did so.)

=== Since 2009 ===
Shabani later joined the Alliance for the Future of Kosovo (AAK) and ran for mayor under its banner in the 2009 local elections. He was again defeated by Mulaku in the second round. (Note: He also led the AAK's list for Vushtrri and, again, had the option of claiming a mandate after the list won seven seats.)

He appeared in the twenty-second position on the AAK's list in the 2010 parliamentary election. By this time, assembly elections in Kosovo were held under open list proportional representation; he finished forty-second among the list's candidates and was not elected when the AAK won only twelve mandates. He ran for mayor again in the 2013 local elections and for a third time was defeated by Mulaku in the second round. (Note: He appeared in the lead position of a coalition list of the AAK and Democratic League of Dardania (LDD) and once again would have had the option of taking a seat when the list won six mandates.)

Shortly before the 2014 Kosovan parliamentary election, Shabani unexpectedly joined the PDK. He appeared in the seventieth position on a PDK-led coalition list in the election, finished ninety-seventh among the list's candidates, and was not elected when the list won thirty-seven seats. He was later a spokesperson for Kosovo's finance ministry.

== Electoral record ==
=== Local (Vushtrri) ===
2013 Kosovan local elections: Mayor of Vushtrri
Candidate	Party	First round		Second round	
Candidate	Party	Votes	%	Votes	%
Bajram Mulaku (incumbent)	Democratic Party of Kosovo	11,838	38.99	10,329	55.20
Muharrem Shabani	Alliance for the Future of Kosovo–Democratic League of Dardania (Affiliation: Alliance for the Future of Kosovo)	6,801	22.40	8,384	44.80
Refik Ramaj	Democratic League of Kosovo	6,722	22.14		
Xhemajl Pllana	Levizja Vetëvendosje!	3,383	11.14		
Avdullah Klinaku	Justice Party	1,241	4.09		
Remzi Selimi	Movement for Unification	373	1.23		
Total		30,358	100.00	18,713	100.00

2009 Kosovan local elections: Mayor of Vushtrri
Candidate	Party	First round		Second round	
Candidate	Party	Votes	%	Votes	%
Bajram Mulaku (incumbent)	Democratic Party of Kosovo	12,552	48.96	12,331	62.78
Muharrem Shabani	Alliance for the Future of Kosovo	6,777	26.43	7,312	37.22
Ibush Jonuzi	Democratic League of Kosovo	5,020	19.58		
Halil Kuqi	Democratic League of Dardania	1,141	4.45		
Emine Qerkezi	Social Democratic Party of Kosovo	147	0.57		
Total		25,637	100.00	19,643	100.00

2007 Kosovan local elections: Mayor of Vushtrri
Candidate	Party	First round		Second round	
Candidate	Party	Votes	%	Votes	%
Bajram Mulaku	Democratic Party of Kosovo	7,471	34.70	7,697	56.99
Muharrem Shabani (incumbent)	Civic Initiative "Democratic Union"	4,980	23.13	5,808	43.01
Hajzer Krasniqi	Democratic League of Kosovo	4,016	18.65		
Naim Azemi	New Kosovo Alliance	1,464	6.80		
Menderes Ibra	Alliance for the Future of Kosovo	1,270	5.90		
Lutfi Bilalli	Democratic League of Dardania	1,036	4.81		
Sabit Kadriu	Independent	660	3.07		
Abit Asllani	ORA	492	2.28		
Nexhat Sopjani	Albanian Republican Party	143	0.66		
Total		21,532	100.00	13,505	100.00
