= Hajzer Hajzeraj =

Kosovan politician and military leader

Hajzer Hajzeraj (1943–16 February 2009) was a politician and military leader in Kosovo. He is recognized as having been the first minister of defence in the breakaway Republic of Kosova, serving from 1991 to 1993.

== Early life and career ==
Hajzeraj was born during World War II to a Kosovo Albanian family in Istog. After the war, he was raised in the Autonomous Region of Kosovo and Metohija in the People's Republic of Serbia, Federal People's Republic of Yugoslavia.

After working as a teacher in his hometown, Hajzeraj moved to Pristina and became an employee of Serbia's ministry of education, science, and culture. He worked in defence preparation and received a graduate degree in defence sciences from the University of Pristina. Before 1990, he was leader of the provincial headquarters of the Territorial Defence of Kosovo in the Yugoslav People's Army (JNA).

== Republic of Kosova ==
Secessionist forces in Kosovo established the breakaway Republic of Kosova in September 1991, against the backdrop of the breakup of Yugoslavia. Bujar Bukoshi, the prime minister of this entity, secretly appointed Hajzeraj as its minister of defence.

In late September 1993, Hajzeraj was one of more than thirty ethnic Albanians in Kosovo arrested by the Serbian ministry of internal affairs on suspicion of "preparing an armed uprising" against the Federal Republic of Yugoslavia. The Serbian police said they had seized "large quantities of arms, ammunition, explosives and subversive propaganda material." At the subsequent trial in June 1994, Hajzeraj and his fellow defendants were accused of trying to set up "a Kosovo Republican army" of forty thousand men to fight for Kosovo's independence. Hajzeraj denied the charge at the time, stating, "I never advocated Kosovo's secession, only its autonomy." In July 1994, he was found guilty and sentenced to seven and a half years in prison.

After being released from prison in 1999, Hajzeraj confirmed that he had, in fact, been the Republic of Kosova's minister of defence from 1991 to 1993 and that his responsibilities included organizing armed units, which he described as territorial defence forces for self-protection. A review of these events many years later noted that the "ministry of defence" was still in its early stages of organization in 1993 and that the arrest of Hajzeraj and his colleagues had revealed almost the entire network of the ministry to Serbian authorities.

== Political activities after the Kosovo War ==
Hajzeraj became a member of the New Kosovo Alliance (AKR) in the 2000s. He was the party's candidate for mayor of Istog in the 2007 Kosovan local elections and finished fourth against incumbent Fadil Ferati of the Democratic League of Kosovo (LDK). He also appeared in the lead position on the AKR's electoral list for the local assembly and was elected when the list won two seats.

== Death ==
Hajzeraj died on 16 February 2009 after a short illness.

== Electoral record ==
=== Local (Istog) ===
2007 Kosovan local elections: Mayor of Istog
Candidate	Party	First round		Second round	
Candidate	Party	Votes	%	Votes	%
Fadil Ferati (incumbent)	Democratic League of Kosovo	6,650	42.61	8,837	63.45
Idriz Blakaj	Democratic Party of Kosovo	3,802	24.36	5,090	36.55
Rifat Osmanaj	Democratic League of Dardania	2,642	16.93		
Hajzer Hajzeraj	New Kosovo Alliance	1,052	6.74		
Sadri Jahaj	Alliance for the Future of Kosovo	960	6.15		
Naser Shatri	Naser Shatri	392	2.51		
Ibrahim Shatri	ORA	110	0.70		
Total		15,608	100.00	13,927	100.00
