= Ali Berisha =

Kosov politician (born 1962)

Ali Berisha (born 9 September 1962) is a medical doctor and politician in Kosovo. He was the mayor of Peja from 2007 to 2013 and served two terms in the Assembly of the Republic of Kosovo between 2016 and 2021. Berisha is a member of the Alliance for the Future of Kosovo (AAK).

== Medical career ==
Berisha is an internal medical specialist and a graduate of the University of Pristina's Faculty of Medicine. He was active with the Kosovo Liberation Army's medical division in the Kosovo War (1998–99), operating as head of medical services for the Dukagjin (Metohija) region. From 2001 to 2007, he was director of the hospital in Peja.

== Politician ==
=== Early years after the Kosovo War (2000–07) ===
Berisha appeared in the eleventh position on the AAK's electoral list for Peja in the 2000 Kosovan local elections. Local assembly elections in Kosovo are held under open list proportional representation; he finished third among the party's candidates and was elected when the list won eight seats. The Democratic League of Kosovo (LDK) won a majority victory, and the AAK served in opposition.

Berisha was promoted to the second position on the AAK's list in the 2002 local elections and was presumably re-elected when the list won twelve seats. The LDK once again won the election.

In February 2004, Berisha and Kosovo minister of environment and town planning Ethem Çeku were injured in a car explosion. A media report of the incident described Berisha as the AAK's leader in Peja.

Berisha was given the twenty-second position on the AAK's list in the 2004 Kosovan parliamentary election, which was held under closed list proportional representation, and was not elected when the party won nine seats.

=== Mayor of Peja (2007–13) ===
Kosovo introduced the direct election of mayors in the 2007 local elections, and Berisha was elected as mayor of Peja in the second round of voting, defeating Gazmend Muhaxheri of the Reformist Party ORA. One of his first acts as mayor was to inaugurate TV Diaspora, a branch of Radio Television of Kosovo (RTK) in Peja, in January 2008.

Kosovo unilaterally declared independence from Serbia as the Republic of Kosovo in February 2008. Serbia does not recognize the declaration and considers Kosovo as a constituent province. In May 2008, the Serbian government organized parallel local elections in Kosovo. Berisha indicated that he could not prevent the Serbian vote from taking place in Peja as his authority did not extend to the municipality's Serb localities, particularly the village of Goraždevac. Following the vote, he was quoted as saying, "I do not believe that the governmental levels of Kosova or UNMIK will allow [the creation of parallel municipal assemblies in the Serb communities], but even if they will be allowed by them, the establishment of a municipality within our municipality is unacceptable. Therefore, the Peja Municipality will use all legal forms and all municipal competencies not to allow the establishment of parallel structures in its territory."

In October 2009, Berisha complained that two signs reading "Welcome to Montenegro" and "Goodbye" had been put up by Montenegrin state authorities inside the territory of Kosovo.

Berisha was re-elected as mayor of Peja in the 2009 local elections. In February 2010, he made an arrangement with European Union Special Representative Pieter Feith for Serb representation in the local government, appointing a representative from Goraždevac as second deputy mayor. In June 2010, Berisha was quoted prominently in a Financial Times article on Peja's challenging recovery after the Kosovo War.

After the 2010 Kosovan parliamentary election, Berisha took part in an AAK delegation to The Hague for a meeting with party leader Ramush Haradinaj, who was then facing a retrial before the International Criminal Tribunal for the former Yugoslavia (ICTY). The delegation afterward reported that the AAK would not join a coalition government led by Democratic Party of Kosovo (PDK) leader Hashim Thaçi. Thaçi ultimately became the leader of a new ministry, and the AAK served in opposition.

In the 2013 local elections, Berisha complained that little financial support had been forthcoming from Kosovo's PDK-led government in the previous term. "Excluding some investments in schools and some suburban roads that were done for a handful of votes, there were no other capital investments, which are the government's obligation and which would have developed the municipality," he said. In a rematch from 2007, Berisha was defeated in the second round by Gazmend Muhaxheri, who had by this time joined the LDK.

=== First term in parliament (2016–17) ===
All parliamentary elections in Kosovo since 2007 have been held under open list proportional representation. Berisha appeared in the sixteenth position on the AAK's list in the 2014 parliamentary election and finished tenth among the party's candidates. The AAK won eleven seats. Berisha was not immediately elected due to a requirement for one-third female representation.

In early 2016, AAK leader Ramush Haradinaj resigned from the assembly. As the next candidate in sequence on the party's list, Berisha was given a mandate as his replacement on 10 March. The AAK served in opposition during this time. Berisha was a member of the committee for health, labour, and social welfare, and the committee for the rights and interests of communities and return. He was a prominent opponent of a border demarcation agreement with Montenegro that saw Kosovo cede some land it had previously claimed.

The AAK formed an alliance with the PDK for the 2017 parliamentary election. Berisha appeared in the thirty-second position on their combined list, finished fifty-eighth, and was not re-elected when the list won thirty-nine seats.

=== Deputy Minister (2017–19) ===
AAK leader Ramush Haradinaj became prime minister of Kosovo for a second time following the 2017 election. In October 2017, he appointed Berisha as deputy minister of health. A media report from this period identifies Berisha as a leading confidant of Haradinaj and a prominent, respected figure within the AAK. He served as a deputy minister until a change of government in 2019.

Berisha urged Albanian citizens of Montenegro to support Milo Đukanović in the 2018 Montenegrin presidential election, describing Đukanović as "very important for the Euro-Atlantic integration of the region."

In July 2018, Berisha was named as vice-president of the AAK.

=== Second term in parliament (2019–21) ===
The AAK's alliance with the PDK proved to be short-lived, and the parties fielded separate lists in the 2019 parliamentary election. Berisha was given the twenty-ninth place on the AAK's list, finished eighth, and was elected to a second term when the list won thirteen seats. The AAK initially served in opposition once again, although in 2020 it joined a coalition government led by the LDK. In the latter period, Berisha was a government supporter.

He was promoted to the thirteenth position on the AAK's list in the 2021 parliamentary election but finished twenty-first and was not re-elected when the list fell to eight seats.

== Electoral record ==
=== Local (Peja) ===
2013 Kosovan local elections: Mayor of Peja
| Candidate | Party | First round | | Second round | |
| Candidate | Party | Votes | % | Votes | % |
|---|---|---|---|---|---|
| Gazmend Muhaxheri | Democratic League of Kosovo | 17,200 | 40.97 | 23,211 | 56.37 |
| Ali Berisha (incumbent) | Alliance for the Future of Kosovo–Democratic League of Dardania (Affiliation: Alliance for the Future of Kosovo) | 15,269 | 36.37 | 17,967 | 43.63 |
| Muhamet Halitaj | Democratic Party of Kosovo | 6,392 | 15.23 | | |
| Hivzi Muharremi | Levizja Vetëvendosje! | 1,638 | 3.90 | | |
| Myhedin Sylqa | Justice Party | 998 | 2.38 | | |
| Gazmir Raci | Democratic Alternative of Kosovo | 197 | 0.47 | | |
| Arsim Belegu | New Kosovo Alliance | 160 | 0.38 | | |
| Dreshai Ramé | Social Movement of Kosovo | 125 | 0.30 | | |
| Total | | 41,979 | 100.00 | 41,178 | 100.00 |

2009 Kosovan local elections: Mayor of Peja
| Candidate | Party | First round | | Second round | |
| Candidate | Party | Votes | % | Votes | % |
|---|---|---|---|---|---|
| Ali Berisha (incumbent) | Alliance for the Future of Kosovo | 16,051 | 43.68 | 15,061 | 76.80 |
| Elmi Berisha | Democratic League of Dardania | 5,845 | 15.91 | 4,549 | 23.20 |
| Ilhami Gashi | Democratic Party of Kosovo | 5,152 | 14.02 | | |
| Agim Bërdyna | Democratic League of Kosovo | 4,668 | 12.70 | | |
| Gazmend Muhaxheri | ORA | 3,628 | 9.87 | | |
| Adem Gorani | Justice Party | 801 | 2.18 | | |
| Ramiz Libusha | Social Democratic Party of Kosovo | 600 | 1.63 | | |
| Total | | 36,745 | 100.00 | 19,610 | 100.00 |

2007 Kosovan local elections: Mayor of Peja
| Candidate | Party | First round | | Second round | |
| Candidate | Party | Votes | % | Votes | % |
|---|---|---|---|---|---|
| Ali Berisha | Alliance for the Future of Kosovo | 8,203 | 23.00 | 18,068 | 67.63 |
| Gazmend Muhaxheri | ORA | 6,311 | 17.69 | 8,646 | 32.37 |
| Hajredin Kuçi | Democratic Party of Kosovo | 5,415 | 15.18 | | |
| Smajl Shala | Democratic League of Dardania | 5,002 | 14.02 | | |
| Agim Bërdyna | Democratic League of Kosovo | 4,798 | 13.45 | | |
| Sali Kelmendi | Sali Kelmendi | 2,580 | 7.23 | | |
| Burim Basha | New Kosovo Alliance | 2,417 | 6.78 | | |
| Sahudin Hysenaj | Justice Party | 542 | 1.52 | | |
| Valdet Gashi | Valdet Gashi | 401 | 1.12 | | |
| Total | | 35,669 | 100.00 | 26,714 | 100.00 |
