= 2009 Kosovan local elections =

Local elections were held in Kosovo on 15 November and 13 December 2009. These were the first local elections to be held after Kosovo declared independence in February 2008. The elections were to elect mayors and municipal councils in 36 municipalities, and were contested by 37 ethnic Albanian parties and 21 Serbian lists. All citizens with a valid ID were able to vote in the elections.

Pieter Feith, the European Union Special Representative in Kosovo, declared before the election that he expected the elections to "pass the democratic test".

The elections were still unfinished two months after starting. Many cities recounted votes or ordered fresh voting.

Prizren and Lipjan held their elections on 31 January 2009.

These elections resulted in Democratic Party of Kosovo control over the majority of local positions.

== Results ==
=== Gjakova District ===
==== Gjakova ====
Mayoral results
Candidate	Party	Votes	%
Pal Lekaj (incumbent)	Alliance for the Future of Kosovo	21,861	51.92
Mimoza Kusari Lila	New Kosovo Alliance	17,463	41.48
Fehmi Vula	Democratic League of Kosovo	1,937	4.60
Ilir Bytyqi	Democratic Party of Kosovo	787	1.87
Shahin Roka	Social Democratic Party of Kosovo	54	0.13
Total		42,102	100.00

Municipal assembly results
Party	Votes	%	Seats
Alliance for the Future of Kosovo	11,215	29.01	12
New Kosovo Alliance	7,205	18.64	7
Democratic League of Kosovo	4,719	12.21	5
Albanian Christian Democratic Party of Kosovo	3,655	9.45	4
Democratic Party of Kosovo	2,688	6.95	3
Democratic League of Dardania	2,536	6.56	3
ORA	2,105	5.45	2
New Democratic Initiative of Kosovo	940	2.43	1
Democratic Christian Party for Integration	925	2.39	1
Justice Party	775	2.00	1
Movement for Integration and Unification	684	1.77	1
Liberal Party of Kosovo	585	1.51	1
Social Democratic Party of Kosovo	366	0.95	–
National Front	203	0.53	–
Democratic Ashkali Party of Kosovo	51	0.13	–
Montenegrin Democratic Party	6	0.02	–
Total	38,658	100.00	41

==== Deçan ====
Mayoral results
Candidate	Party	Votes	%
Rasim Selmanaj	Alliance for the Future of Kosovo	9,899	67.82
Mehmet Bojkaj	Democratic League of Kosovo	2,727	18.68
Musë Mushkolaj	Democratic Party of Kosovo	890	6.10
Ismet Hulaj	Democratic League of Dardania	554	3.80
Tahir Kuçi	Social Democratic Party of Kosovo	526	3.60
Total		14,596	100.00

Municipal assembly results
Party	Votes	%	Seats
Alliance for the Future of Kosovo	7,697	57.70	16
Democratic League of Kosovo	2,620	19.64	5
Democratic League of Dardania	1,215	9.11	2
Democratic Party of Kosovo	1,097	8.22	2
New Kosovo Alliance	368	2.76	1
Social Democratic Party of Kosovo	267	2.00	1
National Front	60	0.45	–
People's Montenegrin Party of Kosovo	9	0.07	–
Montenegrin Democratic Party	6	0.04	–
Total	13,339	100.00	27

==== Junik ====
Mayoral results
Candidate	Party	First round		Second round	
Candidate	Party	Votes	%	Votes	%
Agron Kuçi	Alliance for the Future of Kosovo	1,109	49.64	1,268	56.76
Tahir Isufaj (incumbent)	Democratic League of Kosovo	730	32.68	966	43.24
Shpejtim Gacaferi	Democratic League of Dardania	239	10.70		
Niman Tofaj	Democratic Party of Kosovo	133	5.95		
Ali Kasumi	New Kosovo Alliance	23	1.03		
Total		2,234	100.00	2,234	100.00

Municipal assembly results
Party	Votes	%	Seats
Alliance for the Future of Kosovo	892	43.49	7
Democratic League of Kosovo	708	34.52	5
Democratic League of Dardania	242	11.80	2
Democratic Party of Kosovo	170	8.29	1
New Kosovo Alliance	39	1.90	–
Total	2,051	100.00	15

==== Rahovec ====
Mayoral results
Candidate	Party	First round		Second round	
Candidate	Party	Votes	%	Votes	%
Qazim Qeska (incumbent)	Democratic Party of Kosovo	7,398	36.00	10,205	50.63
Ibrahim Kryeziu	Democratic League of Kosovo	4,694	22.84	9,950	49.37
Islam Gashi	Alliance for the Future of Kosovo	3,867	18.82		
Rexhep Oruqi	New Kosovo Alliance	2,800	13.62		
Salih Hoti	Movement for Integration and Unification	1,680	8.17		
Lulzim Krasniqi	Social Democratic Party of Kosovo	112	0.54		
Total		20,551	100.00	20,155	100.00

Qazim Qeska resigned as mayor in mid-2010. He later attempted to return to the position but was prevented from doing so by a court decision. A new mayoral election took place over two rounds on 21 November and 19 December.

Municipal assembly results
Party	Votes	%	Seats
Democratic Party of Kosovo	5,989	31.26	10
Democratic League of Kosovo	4,344	22.67	8
Alliance for the Future of Kosovo	3,105	16.21	5
New Kosovo Alliance	2,321	12.11	4
Movement for Integration and Unification	1,408	7.35	2
Justice Party	686	3.58	1
Democratic League of Dardania	641	3.35	–
Independent Liberal Party	157	0.82	–
Liberal Party of Kosovo	131	0.68	–
Social Democratic Party of Kosovo	110	0.57	–
ORA	103	0.54	–
Civic Initiative "Orahovac – V.Hoća"	91	0.47	–
New Democratic Initiative of Kosovo	73	0.38	–
Total	19,159	100.00	30

=== Mitrovica District ===
==== Mitrovica ====
Mayoral results
Candidate	Party	First round		Second round	
Candidate	Party	Votes	%	Votes	%
Avni Kastrati	Democratic Party of Kosovo	11,137	39.17	10,999	53.12
Nexhmedin Spahiu	New Kosovo Alliance	6,417	22.57	9,708	46.88
Mursel Ibrahimi	Democratic League of Kosovo	5,556	19.54		
Hysni Ahmeti	Alliance for the Future of Kosovo	4,678	16.46		
Luljeta Zhubi	ORA	316	1.11		
Rexhep Ahmeti	Socialist Party of Kosovo	122	0.43		
Vesel Neziri	Albanian Republican Party	110	0.39		
Milazim Xhafa	Social Democratic Party of Kosovo	93	0.33		
Total		28,429	100.00	20,707	100.00

Municipal assembly results
Party	Votes	%	Seats
Democratic Party of Kosovo	8,570	33.51	14
Democratic League of Kosovo	5,369	20.99	9
New Kosovo Alliance	4,117	16.10	7
Alliance for the Future of Kosovo	3,538	13.83	6
Democratic League of Dardania	1,413	5.52	2
Justice Party	885	3.46	1
ORA	747	2.92	1
Turkish Democratic Party of Kosovo	373	1.46	1
Social Democratic Party of Kosovo	203	0.79	–
Albanian Republican Party	187	0.73	–
Socialist Party of Kosovo	135	0.53	–
National Front	40	0.16	–
Total	25,577	100.00	41

==== Skenderaj ====
Mayoral results
Candidate	Party	Votes	%
Sami Lushtaku (incumbent)	Democratic Party of Kosovo	25,017	85.02
Fadil Geci	Democratic League of Dardania	3,171	10.78
Rushit Haliti	Alliance for the Future of Kosovo	528	1.79
Abit Haziraj	Green Party of Kosovo	390	1.33
Liridon Hoti	Socialist Party of Kosovo	318	1.08
Total		29,424	100.00

Municipal assembly results
Party	Votes	%	Seats
Democratic Party of Kosovo	22,587	79.27	26
Democratic League of Dardania	2,959	10.39	3
New Kosovo Alliance	941	3.30	1
Democratic League of Kosovo	518	1.82	1
Green Party of Kosovo	363	1.27	–
Socialist Party of Kosovo	357	1.25	–
Alliance for the Future of Kosovo	350	1.23	–
Justice Party	247	0.87	–
Movement for Integration and Unification	141	0.49	–
Liberal Party of Kosovo	30	0.11	–
Total	28,493	100.00	31

==== Vushtrri ====
Mayoral results
Candidate	Party	First round		Second round	
Candidate	Party	Votes	%	Votes	%
Bajram Mulaku (incumbent)	Democratic Party of Kosovo	12,552	48.96	12,331	62.78
Muharrem Shabani	Alliance for the Future of Kosovo	6,777	26.43	7,312	37.22
Ibush Jonuzi	Democratic League of Kosovo	5,020	19.58		
Halil Kuqi	Democratic League of Dardania	1,141	4.45		
Emine Qerkezi	Social Democratic Party of Kosovo	147	0.57		
Total		25,637	100.00	19,643	100.00

Municipal assembly results
Party	Votes	%	Seats
Democratic Party of Kosovo	9,485	40.27	15
Alliance for the Future of Kosovo	4,844	20.57	7
Democratic League of Kosovo	4,486	19.05	7
New Kosovo Alliance	1,292	5.49	2
Movement for Unification	937	3.98	1
Democratic League of Dardania	909	3.86	1
Justice Party	631	2.68	1
Turkish Democratic Party of Kosovo	429	1.82	1
Social Democratic Party of Kosovo	159	0.68	–
Socialist Party of Kosovo	151	0.64	–
Movement for Integration and Unification	116	0.49	–
National Front	84	0.36	–
Serb People's Party	16	0.07	–
Independent Liberal Party	14	0.06	–
Total	23,553	100.00	35

==== Unrecognized results in predominantly Serb municipalities ====
The Serb community in northern Kosovo generally boycotted the 2009 local elections. Although elections were formally held and results certified for Leposavić, Zubin Potok, and Zvečan, the turnouts were extremely low, the outcomes were not recognized internationally or in the communities in question, and the winning candidates never took power.

===== Leposavić =====
Mayoral results
Candidate	Party	Votes	%
Ardita Hasani	Alliance for the Future of Kosovo	34	100.00
Total		34	100.00

Municipal assembly results
Party	Votes	%	Seats
Vakat Coalition	80	70.80	6
Alliance for the Future of Kosovo	30	26.55	2
Democratic League of Dardania	3	2.65	1
Total	113	100.00	9

Note: The nine candidates who were formally elected were the only candidates on the ballot. There were nineteen seats in the assembly.

===== Zubin Potok =====
Mayoral results
Candidate	Party	Votes	%
Naser Ferizi	Democratic Party of Kosovo	233	53.32
Fatmir Kahrimani	Alliance for the Future of Kosovo	204	46.68
Goran Radivojević	Serbian Democratic Party of Kosovo and Metohija	0	0.00
Total		437	100.00

Municipal assembly results
Party	Votes	%	Seats
Democratic League of Kosovo	250	53.65	16
Democratic Party of Kosovo	205	43.99	1
Alliance for the Future of Kosovo	11	2.36	2
Total	466	100.00	19

Note: There was only one candidate on the Democratic Party of Kosovo's list.

===== Zvečan =====
Mayoral results
Candidate	Party	Votes	%
Semi Kelmendi	Alliance for the Future of Kosovo	33	100.00
Dragan Stojković	Serbian Democratic Party of Kosovo and Metohija	0	0.00
Total		33	100.00

Municipal assembly results
Party	Votes	%	Seats
Alliance for the Future of Kosovo	36	100.00	2
Serbian Democratic Party of Kosovo and Metohija	0	0.00	–
Total	36	100.00	2

Note: There were only two candidates on the Alliance for the Future of Kosovo's list. There were nineteen seats in the assembly.

=== Peja District ===
==== Peja ====
Mayoral results
Candidate	Party	First round		Second round	
Candidate	Party	Votes	%	Votes	%
Ali Berisha (incumbent)	Alliance for the Future of Kosovo	16,051	43.68	15,061	76.80
Elmi Berisha	Democratic League of Dardania	5,845	15.91	4,549	23.20
Ilhami Gashi	Democratic Party of Kosovo	5,152	14.02		
Agim Bërdyna	Democratic League of Kosovo	4,668	12.70		
Gazmend Muhaxheri	ORA	3,628	9.87		
Adem Gorani	Justice Party	801	2.18		
Ramiz Libusha	Social Democratic Party of Kosovo	600	1.63		
Total		36,745	100.00	19,610	100.00

Municipal assembly results
Party	Votes	%	Seats
Alliance for the Future of Kosovo	10,874	31.84	13
Democratic Party of Kosovo	4,926	14.42	6
Democratic League of Kosovo	4,813	14.09	6
Democratic League of Dardania	3,555	10.41	4
ORA	2,708	7.93	3
New Kosovo Alliance	1,801	5.27	2
Social Democratic Party of Kosovo	1,431	4.19	2
Party of Democratic Action	808	2.37	1
Party of Democratic Change	687	2.01	1
Justice Party	561	1.64	1
Vakat Coalition	514	1.51	1
New Democratic Initiative of Kosovo	490	1.43	1
Democratic Christian Party for Integration	351	1.03	–
Sabahudin Ciriković	319	0.93	–
United Roma Party of Kosovo	123	0.36	–
Socialist Party of Kosovo	101	0.30	–
Albanian Christian Democratic Party of Kosovo	68	0.20	–
Montenegrin Democratic Party	22	0.06	–
Total	34,152	100.00	41

==== Istog ====
Mayoral results
Candidate	Party	First round		Second round	
Candidate	Party	Votes	%	Votes	%
Fadil Ferati (incumbent)	Democratic League of Kosovo	7,839	47.47	7,088	70.65
Naim Imeraj	Alliance for the Future of Kosovo	3,553	21.52	2,945	29.35
Idriz Blakaj	Democratic Party of Kosovo	2,864	17.34		
Rifat Osmanaj	Democratic League of Dardania	1,992	12.06		
Gojart Lubeniqi	New Democracy of Kosovo	165	1.00		
Afrim Sadikaj	Social Democratic Party of Kosovo	100	0.61		
Total		16,513	100.00	10,033	100.00

Fadil Ferati died on 30 January 2010, and a new mayoral election was held over two rounds on 11 April and 9 May. Haki Rugova of the Democratic League of Kosovo served as acting mayor pending the new election.

Municipal assembly results
Party	Votes	%	Seats
Democratic League of Kosovo	5,734	37.22	11
Alliance for the Future of Kosovo	3,418	22.19	6
Democratic Party of Kosovo	2,535	16.45	5
Democratic League of Dardania	1,696	11.01	3
New Kosovo Alliance	512	3.32	1
New Democratic Initiative of Kosovo	310	2.01	1
Party of Democratic Action	221	1.43	–
Vakat Coalition	219	1.42	–
Social Democratic Party of Kosovo	204	1.32	–
Justice Party	191	1.24	–
Liberal Party of Kosovo	176	1.14	–
New Democracy of Kosovo	117	0.76	–
Party of Democratic Change	72	0.47	–
Serbian Democratic Party of Kosovo and Metohija	1	0.01	–
Total	15,406	100.00	27

==== Klina ====
Mayoral results
Candidate	Party	First round		Second round	
Candidate	Party	Votes	%	Votes	%
Sokol Bashota (incumbent)	Democratic Party of Kosovo	6,332	36.77	9,631	57.10
Enver Berisha	Alliance for the Future of Kosovo	5,490	31.88	7,235	42.90
Fadil Gashi	Democratic League of Kosovo	3,802	22.08		
Zenun Zeqa	Democratic League of Dardania	728	4.23		
Pjetër Coli	Albanian Christian Democratic Party of Kosovo	479	2.78		
Haki Morina	Socialist Party of Kosovo	160	0.93		
Ibish Rraci	Social Democratic Party of Kosovo	128	0.74		
Adem Gashi	Adem Haxhi Gashi	101	0.59		
Total		17,220	100.00	16,866	100.00

Municipal assembly results
Party	Votes	%	Seats
Democratic Party of Kosovo	5,115	32.27	9
Alliance for the Future of Kosovo	4,912	30.99	9
Democratic League of Kosovo	3,388	21.38	6
Democratic League of Dardania	1,120	7.07	2
Albanian Christian Democratic Party of Kosovo	320	2.02	1
New Kosovo Alliance	279	1.76	–
Social Democratic Party of Kosovo	276	1.74	–
Democratic Christian Party for Integration	207	1.31	–
Socialist Party of Kosovo	101	0.64	–
New Democratic Initiative of Kosovo	82	0.52	–
Adem Haxhi Gashi	38	0.24	–
Liberal Party of Kosovo	12	0.08	–
Total	15,850	100.00	27
