= Sadri Ferati =

Kosovan politician

- Sadri Ferati

Minister of Local Government of Kosovo
- In office 9 January 2008 – 18 October 2010
- Prime Minister: Hashim Thaçi

Member of the Assembly of Kosovo
- In office 2011–2017

Personal details
- Born: June 10, 1957 (age 69) Mitrovica, PR Serbia, FPR Yugoslavia
- Party: Democratic League of Kosovo (LDK)
- Education: University of Pristina
- Occupation: Politician; mining engineer

Sadri Ferati (born 10 June 1957) is a politician in Kosovo. He was minister of local government in the Republic of Kosovo government from 2008 to 2010 and served in the Assembly of Kosovo from 2011 to 2017. Ferati is a member of the Democratic League of Kosovo (LDK).

== Early life and career ==
Ferati was born to a Kosovo Albanian family in Kosovska Mitrovica, in what was then the Autonomous Region of Kosovo and Metohija in the People's Republic of Serbia, People's Federal Republic of Yugoslavia. He holds a bachelor's degree from the University of Pristina in mining and metallurgy and has worked in the private sector and for state institutions.

== Politician ==
In the 1990s, most members of the Kosovo Albanian community boycotted Serbian state institutions and took part in parallel governing structures. Ferati was a member of the "parallel" Assembly of Kosovo. He later appeared in the seventieth position on the LDK's electoral list in the 2004 Kosovan parliamentary election, which was held under closed list proportional representation, and was not elected when the list won forty-seven seats.

Ferati became chief executive officer in the local government of southern Mitrovica in 2005. He responded negatively to the Ahtisaari Plan for self-rule in Kosovo two years later, saying that full independence was inevitable and could take the form of a unilateral declaration.

He ran for mayor of Mitrovica in the 2007 Kosovan local elections and was defeated in the second round by Bajram Rexhepi of the Democratic Party of Kosovo (PDK).

=== Minister of Local Government (2008–10) ===
The 2007 Kosovan parliamentary election did not produce a clear winner and led to a coalition government of the PDK and LDK. On 9 January 2008, Ferati was appointed as minister of local government.

Ferati's main policy initiative was decentralization, and much of his attention was focused on integrating Kosovo's Serb community into the political institutions of the Pristina government. Shortly before Kosovo's unilateral declaration of independence in February 2008, he visited Babin Most in Obiliq to meet with Serb returnees who indicated their willingness to remain in an independent state. On more than one occasion, he pledged that his government would ensure the safety of Serb returnees generally. In the same period, Ferati also supported the efforts of displaced Albanians to return to their homes into the predominantly Serb northern part of Mitrovica.

After Kosovo's declaration of independence, the Serbian government held its own parallel local elections in Kosovo in May 2008. Ferati indicated that Kosovo's government would not recognize the results or co-operate with the elected officials. He was quoted as saying, "Serbia will never establish its institutions in Kosovo; Serbian laws will not be implemented in Kosovo. We are offering an opportunity for everyone to be equal, for everyone to perceive the state and its institutions as something that belongs to all of you, to all Kosovans."

In June 2008, Ferati oversaw the creation of the municipalities of Junik, Hani i Elezit, and Mamusha (the latter being the only municipality in Kosovo with a Turkish majority). He later established the predominantly Serb municipalities of Klokot, Gračanica, Ranilug, and Parteš, and worked toward the creation of a North Mitrovica municipality. Ferati said that his government's end goal was for Kosovo to have thirty-eight municipalities, of which twenty-seven would be predominantly Albanian, ten predominantly Serb, and one with a Turkish majority. In August 2009, he said that the Serb municipalities would have significant autonomy and would effectively provide Serbs with a "state within the state of Kosovo."

Ferati urged Serbs to participate in the 2009 Kosovan local elections. Following the vote, he welcomed the election of Serb mayors who pledged to work within Kosovo's institutions. In June 2010, he described as encouraging a high Serb turnout in the election to establish the new Parteš municipality.

In a 2010 interview, Ferati said that a "one city with two municipalities" model was the only viable solution to the situation in Mitrovica.

Although the decentralization plan was supported by some in the Serb community, it was not endorsed by the Serbian government and did not lead to a breakthrough in Pristina's relations with the predominantly Serb municipalities in Kosovo's north. The plan was also opposed by the Kosovo Albanian Vetëvendosje party, which argued that it would lead to the "ethnic division" of Kosovo. During this period, Vetëvendosje used the slogan, "Decentralization Means Partition - Partition Means War."

In addition to his main responsibilities, Ferati was appointed to a ministerial committee overseeing the privatization of Post and Telecommunications of Kosovo in late 2008. In 2010, he signed cross-border co-operation treaties with Albania and the Republic of Macedonia (now North Macedonia) on behalf of the Kosovo government.

The LDK withdrew from Kosovo's coalition government in October 2010, bringing Ferati's ministerial tenure to an end.

=== Parliamentarian (2010–17) ===
Ferati appeared in the twenty-sixth position on the LDK's coalition electoral list in the 2010 Kosovan parliamentary election. All parliamentary elections in Kosovo since 2007 have been held under open list proportional representation; Ferati finished twentieth among the coalition's candidates and was elected when the list won twenty-seven seats. The PDK won the election, and the LDK served in opposition in the following term. Ferati served on the assembly committee that oversaw local government issues.

He rejected the idea that the status of Kosovo could be settled by partition in May 2011, describing the suggestion as "primitive and dangerous." He later expressed skepticism about the government's plan to open an administrative office in the north of Kosovo, saying that existing conditions could not guarantee its success and that a lack of co-operation from Serbs would simply strengthen the Serbian government's parallel institutions.

Ferati often spoke on behalf of the LDK in the negotiations that led to the 2013 Brussels Agreement, which normalized some aspects of the relationship between Belgrade and Pristina without addressing the status of Kosovo. After the agreement was signed, Serbs in the north of Kosovo generally began engaging with the Pristina authorities; Ferati spoke favourably of the Community of Serb Municipalities envisioned by the agreement. On the local government committee, he helped design amendments to ensure the Serb association would function in conformity with Kosovo's law on local administration and that it would be registered as a non-governmental organization. (The amendments were not voted on due to the dissolution of the assembly and later met with opposition from the Serb List.)

In the 2014 Kosovan parliamentary election, Ferati finished twenty-first among the LDK candidates and was re-elected when the party's list won thirty mandates. After extended negotiations, the PDK formed a new coalition government with the LDK, and Ferati served as a government supporter. In this term, he was deputy chair of the committee overseeing local administration.

Ferati's assembly tenure ended in 2017; he finished thirty-sixth among LDK candidates in that year's election and was not elected to a third term when the list fell to twenty-nine seats.

=== Since 2017 ===
In a 2021 interview, Ferati said that the LDK had been stagnating for a number of years and called for renewal within the party.

== Electoral record ==
=== Local (Mitrovica) ===
2007 Kosovan local elections: Mayor of Mitrovica
Candidate	Party	First round		Second round	
Candidate	Party	Votes	%	Votes	%
Bajram Rexhepi	Democratic Party of Kosovo	8,599	36.51	8,861	56.04
Sadri Ferati	Democratic League of Kosovo	5,628	23.90	6,950	43.96
Nexhmedin Spahiu	New Kosovo Alliance	5,437	23.08		
Mustafë Pllana	Democratic League of Dardania	1,704	7.23		
Nysret Maxhera	ORA	893	3.79		
Bahri Xhaferi	Alliance for the Future of Kosovo	724	3.07		
Shefqet Ibrahimi	Justice Party	317	1.35		
Faruk Mujka	Ecological Party of Kosovo	251	1.07		
Total		23,553	100.00	15,811	100.00
