= Sokol Bashota =

Kosovo politician

Sokol Bashota (born 7 March 1966) is a politician and former Kosovo Liberation Army (KLA) leader in Kosovo. He served in the Assembly of Kosovo from 2004 to 2007 and was mayor of Klina from 2007 to 2017. Bashota is a member of the Democratic Party of Kosovo (PDK).

== Early life and career ==
Bashota was born to a Kosovo Albanian family in the village of Caravik in Klina, in what was then the Autonomous Province of Kosovo and Metohija in the former Socialist Federal Republic of Yugoslavia. He graduated in Albanian language and Albanian literature at the University of Pristina.

== Politician ==
=== Kosovo War and early UNMIK mandate (1998–2002) ===
Bashota was deputy commander of the KLA's general headquarters during the Kosovo War and ran its information committee. He was appointed as a member of the KLA's first political committee in August 1998. In October of the same year, against the backdrop of a fragile ceasefire agreement, he said the KLA's strategy if fighting resumed would be to "break the morale of the Serb forces" by initially attacking police in isolated areas. In January 1999, he was part of a KLA delegation that met with American envoy Christopher Hill and European Union envoy Wolfgang Petritsch in an attempt at ending the conflict via diplomatic means.

He was selected for the KLA's delation on the proposed Rambouillet Agreement in early 1999, though ultimately he stayed behind during the discussions. During this time, he said that the KLA would only agree to disarm if the Yugoslav army in Kosovo did the same, with the latter's weapons stored in warehouses controlled by the KLA and the North Atlantic Treaty Organization (NATO). He added that the KLA would insist on a clause in the agreement giving Kosovo Albanians the right to vote for independence after a transitional period, saying that independence for Kosovo was inevitable. A Los Angeles Times report from this period identified him as a "moderate" in the KLA's leadership.

Bashota described Ibrahim Rugova as "[a] man who has never done anything good for Albanians" in a February 1999 interview.

On 2 April 1999, KLA political leader Hashim Thaçi announced the creation of a new provisional government for Kosovo. Bashota was appointed as minister of labour and social affairs. The legitimacy of Thaçi's cabinet was not accepted internationally or by his rivals in the Kosovo Albanian community. Bashota remained a member of Thaçi's self-styled ministry until a new Kosovo government was formed under UNMIK's supervision in early 2002.

Bashota was elected to the inaugural presidency of the Party for the Democratic Progress of Kosovo in October 1999. The party was renamed as the Democratic Party of Kosovo in May 2000.

=== Parliamentarian (2004–07) ===
Bashota received the twenty-ninth position on the PDK's electoral list in the 2004 Kosovan parliamentary election, which was held under closed list proportional representation, and was elected when the party won thirty seats. He was a member of the assembly's security commission in the term that followed. The PDK served in opposition during this time.

All parliamentary elections in Kosovo since 2007 have been held under open list proportional representation. Bashota was given the thirty-seventh position on the PDK's list in the 2007 parliamentary election. He finished forty-fourth among the list's candidates and was not re-elected when the PDK won thirty-seven seats.

=== Mayor of Klina (2007–17) and after ===
Kosovo introduced the direct election of mayors with the 2007 local elections, held concurrently with the parliamentary vote. Bashota ran for mayor of Klina and was elected in the second round. He was re-elected in the 2009 and 2013 votes. At the beginning of his last year in office, he said his priorities were the construction of the "Ismet Rraci" school, completing the square in the middle of the city, and building a youth center. He was somewhat unexpectedly defeated by a candidate of the Alliance for the Future of Kosovo (AAK) in the 2017 Kosovan local elections.

In August 2016, the European Union Rule of Law Mission in Kosovo (EULEX) issued an indictment against Bashota for abuse of office. Three years later, he was convicted of not declaring his personal assets to Kosovo's Anti-Corruption Agency and issued a 1100 Euro fine and a six-month suspended sentence. A subsequent retrial led to an almost identical verdict in 2021, and his conviction in the second trial was afterward upheld on appeal.

Bashota was one of several former KLA officials to receive a summons from the Kosovo Specialist Chambers in The Hague in September 2019, relating to alleged war crimes by the KLA. As he recounted afterward, he was interrogated as a suspect for two days and offered a deal that he declined on the grounds it would harm the KLA. He was then permitted to return to Kosovo.

He was nominated as the PDK's candidate for mayor of Klina in the 2021 local elections but was disqualified due to his previous conviction.

== Electoral record ==
=== Local (Klina) ===
2017 Kosovan local elections: Mayor of Klina
Candidate	Party	First round		Second round	
Candidate	Party	Votes	%	Votes	%
Zenun Elezaj	Alliance for the Future of Kosovo	4,594	25.45	8,397	51.62
Sokol Bashota (incumbent)	Democratic Party of Kosovo	6,816	37.76	7,869	48.38
Besim Hoti	Democratic League of Kosovo	4,211	23.33		
Iber Elezaj	Levizja Vetëvendosje!	1,306	7.23		
Nezir Gashi	Initiative for Kosovo	763	4.23		
Avni Gashi	New Kosovo Alliance	363	2.01		
Total		18,053	100.00	16,266	100.00

2013 Kosovan local elections: Mayor of Klina
Candidate	Party	First round		Second round	
Candidate	Party	Votes	%	Votes	%
Sokol Bashota (incumbent)	Democratic Party of Kosovo	7,976	42.52	6,864	75.12
Enver Berisha	Alliance for the Future of Kosovo	4,575	24.39	2,273	24.88
Fadil Gashi	Democratic League of Kosovo	4,463	23.79		
Prend Buzhala	Albanian Christian Democratic Party of Kosovo	746	3.98		
Avni Gashi	New Kosovo Alliance	512	2.73		
Hajzer Idrizi	Levizja Vetëvendosje!	387	2.06		
Filip Berisha	Christian Democratic Party of Integration	100	0.53		
Total		18,759	100.00	9,137	100.00

2009 Kosovan local elections: Mayor of Klina
Candidate	Party	First round		Second round	
Candidate	Party	Votes	%	Votes	%
Sokol Bashota (incumbent)	Democratic Party of Kosovo	6,332	36.77	9,631	57.10
Enver Berisha	Alliance for the Future of Kosovo	5,490	31.88	7,235	42.90
Fadil Gashi	Democratic League of Kosovo	3,802	22.08		
Zenun Zeqa	Democratic League of Dardania	728	4.23		
Pjetër Coli	Albanian Christian Democratic Party of Kosovo	479	2.78		
Haki Morina	Socialist Party of Kosovo	160	0.93		
Ibish Rraci	Social Democratic Party of Kosovo	128	0.74		
Adem Gashi	Adem Haxhi Gashi	101	0.59		
Total		17,220	100.00	16,866	100.00

2007 Kosovan local elections: Mayor of Klina
Candidate	Party	First round		Second round	
Candidate	Party	Votes	%	Votes	%
Sokol Bashota	Democratic Party of Kosovo	4,578	31.70	7,356	57.92
Prenkë Gjetaj (incumbent)	Democratic League of Kosovo	4,013	27.79	5,344	42.08
Enver Berisha	Alliance for the Future of Kosovo	2,828	19.58		
Zenun Zeqa	Democratic League of Dardania	2,189	15.16		
Fadil Gashi	New Kosovo Alliance	394	2.73		
Rifat Morina	ORA	264	1.83		
Anton Shllaku	Albanian Christian Democratic Party of Kosovo	177	1.23		
Total		14,443	100.00	12,700	100.00
