= Gazmend Muhaxheri =

Kosov politician (born 1964)

Gazmend Muhaxheri (born 27 September 1964) is a politician in Kosovo. He served in the Assembly of Kosovo from 2004 to 2007 with the Reformist Party ORA and has been the mayor of Peja since 2013 as a member of the Democratic League of Kosovo (LDK).

He is a nephew of Ymer Muhaxheri, who was a prominent LDK politician in Peja in the 1990s.

== Private career ==
Muhaxheri is a construction engineer. He is a member of the majority Kosovo Albanian community.

== Politician ==
=== Reformist Party ORA ===
Muhaxheri appeared in the fifth position on the Reformist Party ORA's electoral list in the 2004 Kosovan parliamentary election, which was held under closed list proportional representation, and was elected when the list won seven seats. He was chosen as ORA's representative on the assembly presidency, which had eight members in total. The LDK won the election and formed a coalition government with the Alliance for the Future of Kosovo (AAK), while ORA served in opposition.

In February 2005, Muhaxheri brought forward a request for the assembly discuss the administration's spending practices. When the request was defeated, he accused the government of trying to buy time to "prevent the creation of an investigation commission into their irrational spending."

He welcomed the appointment of Kai Eide as United Nations Secretary General Kofi Annan's special envoy to Kosovo in June 2005. In February 2007, he indicated ORA's support for Martii Ahtisaari's proposal on the status of Kosovo.

All parliamentary elections in Kosovo since 2007 have been held under a system of open list proportional representation. Muhaxheri was again given the fifth position on ORA's list in the 2007 parliamentary election and finished in sixth place among the party's candidates. The list did not cross the electoral threshold, and his parliamentary term came to an end.

He ran for mayor of Peja in the 2007 and 2009 and was defeated on both occasions by Ali Berisha of the Alliance for the Future of Kosovo. He later worked in Berisha's administration, serving as leader of the city's urbanism department from February 2010 to May 2011.

=== Democratic League of Kosovo ===
ORA collectively joined the LDK in 2010; Muhaxheri became a member of the latter party and served on its presidency. In November 2011, he rejected a European Commission report that the LDK, among other parties in Kosovo, was operating its own security service. "The LDK neither has a security service of its own, nor it is linked to [the Republic of Kosovo's Homeland Security], as various circles speculate," he said.

Muhaxheri defeated Berisha for mayor of Peja on his third attempt in the 2013 local elections. He welcomed Albanian prime minister Edi Rama to the city in March 2014 on the latter's tour of Kosovo. He was re-elected in the 2017 local elections.

In February 2019, Muhaxheri opposed the Republic of Kosovo's plans to construct hydropower plants on the Peja Bistrica, noting that the city had committed to a moratorium on hydropower due to the potential for significant environmental damage in nearby Deçan. The republic government ultimately halted the project.

He was elected to a third term as mayor in the 2021 local elections.

Muhaxheri has criticized Kosovo prime minister Albin Kurti for his policies toward the predominantly Serb communities in northern Kosovo. Although Muhaxheri supports the integration of these communities into the Republic of Kosovo, he has accused Kurti of harming Kosovo's interests by acting unilaterally rather than in conjunction with its allies to achieve this end.

In October 2022, Muhaxheri was a guest at the Orthodox Patriarchate of Peć monastery for the enthronement of Serbian patriarch Porfirije. He was applauded by those present, and his attendance was noted in both the Serbian and the Kosovo Albanian media.

== Electoral record ==
=== Local (Peja) ===
2021 Kosovan local elections: Mayor of Peja
Candidate	Party	Votes	%
Gazmend Muhaxheri (incumbent)	Democratic League of Kosovo	23,426	60.49
Gazmend Agusholli	Levizja Vetëvendosje!	8,643	22.32
Rrustem Berisha	Alliance for the Future of Kosovo	6,328	16.34
Gani Veselaj	Gani Veselaj	124	0.32
Kreshnik Husaj	Democratic Party of Unity	120	0.31
Drena Podrimçaku	Partia Balliste	89	0.23
Total		38,730	100.00

2017 Kosovan local elections: Mayor of Peja
Candidate	Party	Votes	%
Gazmend Muhaxheri (incumbent)	Democratic League of Kosovo	22,014	50.23
Fatmir Gashi	Alliance for the Future of Kosovo	13,980	31.90
Sabiha Shala	Democratic Party of Kosovo	4,105	9.37
Bashkim Nurboja	Levizja Vetëvendosje!	2,822	6.44
Sali Kelmendi	Initiative for Kosovo	391	0.89
Reshat Nurboja	The Alternative	286	0.65
Eneida Kelmendi	The Word	226	0.52
Total		43,824	100.00

2013 Kosovan local elections: Mayor of Peja
Candidate	Party	First round		Second round	
Candidate	Party	Votes	%	Votes	%
Gazmend Muhaxheri	Democratic League of Kosovo	17,200	40.97	23,211	56.37
Ali Berisha (incumbent)	Alliance for the Future of Kosovo–Democratic League of Dardania (Affiliation: Alliance for the Future of Kosovo)	15,269	36.37	17,967	43.63
Muhamet Halitaj	Democratic Party of Kosovo	6,392	15.23		
Hivzi Muharremi	Levizja Vetëvendosje!	1,638	3.90		
Myhedin Sylqa	Justice Party	998	2.38		
Gazmir Raci	Democratic Alternative of Kosovo	197	0.47		
Arsim Belegu	New Kosovo Alliance	160	0.38		
Dreshai Ramé	Social Movement of Kosovo	125	0.30		
Total		41,979	100.00	41,178	100.00

2009 Kosovan local elections: Mayor of Peja
Candidate	Party	First round		Second round	
Candidate	Party	Votes	%	Votes	%
Ali Berisha (incumbent)	Alliance for the Future of Kosovo	16,051	43.68	15,061	76.80
Elmi Berisha	Democratic League of Dardania	5,845	15.91	4,549	23.20
Ilhami Gashi	Democratic Party of Kosovo	5,152	14.02		
Agim Bërdyna	Democratic League of Kosovo	4,668	12.70		
Gazmend Muhaxheri	ORA	3,628	9.87		
Adem Gorani	Justice Party	801	2.18		
Ramiz Libusha	Social Democratic Party of Kosovo	600	1.63		
Total		36,745	100.00	19,610	100.00

2007 Kosovan local elections: Mayor of Peja
Candidate	Party	First round		Second round	
Candidate	Party	Votes	%	Votes	%
Ali Berisha	Alliance for the Future of Kosovo	8,203	23.00	18,068	67.63
Gazmend Muhaxheri	ORA	6,311	17.69	8,646	32.37
Hajredin Kuçi	Democratic Party of Kosovo	5,415	15.18		
Smajl Shala	Democratic League of Dardania	5,002	14.02		
Agim Bërdyna	Democratic League of Kosovo	4,798	13.45		
Sali Kelmendi	Sali Kelmendi	2,580	7.23		
Burim Basha	New Kosovo Alliance	2,417	6.78		
Sahudin Hysenaj	Justice Party	542	1.52		
Valdet Gashi	Valdet Gashi	401	1.12		
Total		35,669	100.00	26,714	100.00
