= 2013 Kosovan local elections =

Central Election Commission of the Republic of Kosovo symbolics was used on local elections 2013

Local elections were held in Kosovo on 3 November 2013, with a second round on 1 December. These were the first elections which the Serbs of Northern Kosovo participated in since the Republic of Kosovo declared independence in 2008; polls were monitored by the OSCE. There were violent reactions in Serb-majority areas of northern Kosovo.

== Results 1st round ==
- The Democratic Party of Kosovo (PDK) won in Drenas, Kaçanik, Skënderaj and Shtime.
- The Democratic League of Kosovo (LDK) candidates received the most votes in Fushë Kosovë/Kosovo Polje, Istog and Podujevo.
- The Alliance for the Future of Kosovo (AAK) in coalition with Democratic League of Dardania (LDD) won in Deçan/Dečani.
- The Turkish Democratic Party of Kosovo won in Mamusha.
- The independent candidate Rufki Suma (supported by Vetëvendosje!) won in Hani i Elezit.
- Civic Initiative Srpska won in Leposavić, Zvečan, and Zubin Potok.
- The rest of communes went into the second round.

== Incidents in Northern Kosovo ==
In August 2013, members of the "Interim Assembly of the Autonomous Province of Kosovo-Metohija" voted on a statement that said the election would violate Serbian law. This statement was rejected by the governments of Kosovo and of Serbia. Since Kosovo declared independence in 2008, government in these Serb-majority municipalities in the north of Kosovo has been funded by Serbia, and they have been dominated by organised crime and paramilitaries.

In the predominantly Serb area of Northern Kosovo, local Serb hardliners campaigned for a boycott of the elections. Voter intimidation was reported. Right before the election day, on Saturday night, a group of people attacked and severely injured the Civic Initiative Srpska candidate for northern Mitrovica Krstimir Pantić in front of his house in Koloshin street; he was taken to hospital. The entire political spectrum condemned the attack. Though the perpetrators were not found, Pantić pointed to the pro-boycott groups, who were not interested in official representation of Serbs within Kosovo.

On election day, there were incidents and clashes with police, after extremists raided several polling stations and spoiled votes. Staff were assaulted, ballot boxes smashed, and tear gas canisters set off. This disruption caused the elections to be annulled in three polls in northern Mitrovica, repeated on November 17. The government of Serbia had encouraged Serbs in North Kosovo to participate in the elections, but this violence undermined attempts to normalise relations between the two governments. According to the OSCE the voter turnout was 22% in Leposavić, 22% in Zubin Potok and 11.21% in Zvečan. Oliver Ivanović called for the results in the northern four municipalities to be annulled. Following Foreign Minister Enver Hoxhaj declarations that "the mayors in the north should be of Serbian ethnicity", the Albanian opposition accused the government and DPK for having intentionally facilitated the defeat of Albanian candidates for the sake of stimulating the Serbian citizens in the north, despite their low voter turnout.

== Partial repetition in Northern Mitrovica ==
The partial revoting in three polls of Northern Mitrovica on 17 November was quiet without any notable incident. The result reconfirmed Civic Initiative Srpska had the plurality, pushing the municipality elections into the second round on 1 December.

== Results 2nd round ==
The media reported a turnout of 41.5%, while the official statement after the closing of polls from the Central Election Commission chairwoman Valdete Daka gave a turnout of 39.87%.

- New Kosovo Alliance (AKR) won in Gjakova (Đakovica) with Mimoza Kusari Lila, former Minister of Commerce, becoming the first female mayor in the history of the new country. The same New Kosovo Alliance (AKR) (supported by Democratic League of Kosovo) won in Mitrovica.
- Democratic League of Kosovo (LDK) won in Gjilan, Lipjan, Peja, Suva Reka, Ferizaj, and Viti.
- Vetëvendosje! won in Pristina, where LDK had previously ruled since ever.
- Democratic Party of Kosovo (PDK) won in Dragash, Klina, Kamenica, Rahovec, Prizren, and Vushtrri.
- Alliance for the Future of Kosovo (AAK) in coalition with Democratic League of Dardania (LDD) won in Obilić, and Junik.
- Civic Initiative Srpska won in Novo Brdo, Gracanica, Ranillug, Klokot, Partesh (result got suspended by the CEC due to irregularities and partial repetition established for two weeks later), and Northern Mitrovica.
- Independent Liberal Party (SLS) won in Štrpce.
- Civic Initiative for Malisevo (Albanian: Iniciativa Qytetare Për Malishevën) led by former KLA leader and politician Fatmir Limaj, won in Malisheva.

== Incidents during the Second Round ==
Incidents similar to Northern Mitrovica during the first round we reported in Partesh during the second round, where groups of persons entered the voting polls and destroyed the materials. The Central Election Commission reordered re-voting in three polls to be held in December 15, 2013, before finalizing the results for this municipality.

Other controversies sprang in Prishtina, where a video of Isa Mustafa's son trying to buy votes were registered and distributed to the media from a VV! activist.

== Partial repetition in Partesh ==
The repetition took place in Pasjan village on December 15. 1,304 voters (68.78%) participated. Civic Initiative Srpska won over SLS with 52.4%.

== Incidents in overall ==
The official statement from the Prosecution Office during the fourth press conference within December 1, stated that the office received material regarding 44 cases involving 81 persons. Out of these, 16 charges were pressed towards 21 persons. In addition, 8 persons were arrested during the same day for various offenses related to the election process.

== Reactions ==
- (European Union) EU: EU Special Representative in Kosovo Samuel Žbogar said the election was a success, even in Northern Kosovo. He said that there was a good voter turn-out in Northern Kosovo.
- Germany: German government spokesman Steffen Seibert condemned the violence and praised Kosovo and Serbia for the election.
- Organization for Security and Co-operation in Europe: OSCE spokesman Nikola Gaon said that the attack on the electoral process and the OSCE staff cannot be tolerated and that the mission is expecting that the attackers will be found and convicted.
- The Kosovo government called the elections a historical step in integrating the north with the rest of Kosovo, and evaluated them as very positive.
- (United States) American Embassy in Pristina said that they were encouraged by the turnout and the ongoing elections in the north, nevertheless they would be following the reported irregularities and expected that all issues got resolved conforming to Kosovo legislation.
- European Network of Election Monitoring Organizations (ENEMO), in its preliminary conclusions regarding the re-run in Northern Mitrovica, stated that the re-run of the 1st round of local elections in North Mitrovica was conducted efficiently and administered in a peaceful atmosphere in all Polling Centers, with occasional procedural shortcomings.

== Results by municipality ==
=== Gjakova District ===
==== Gjakova ====
Mayoral results
Candidate	Party	First round		Second round	
Candidate	Party	Votes	%	Votes	%
Mimoza Kusari Lila	New Kosovo Alliance	20,160	43.95	25,183	52.38
Pal Lekaj (incumbent)	Alliance for the Future of Kosovo–Democratic League of Dardania (Affiliation: Alliance for the Future of Kosovo)	16,376	35.70	22,890	47.62
Hajdar Beqa	Democratic Party of Kosovo	5,574	12.15		
Luan Gola	Democratic League of Kosovo	2,926	6.38		
Arberije Nagavci	Levizja Vetëvendosje!	830	1.81		
Total		45,866	100.00	48,073	100.00

Municipal assembly results
Party	Votes	%	Seats
Alliance for the Future of Kosovo–Democratic League of Dardania	10,208	24.67	9
New Kosovo Alliance	10,066	24.33	9
Democratic Party of Kosovo	6,762	16.34	6
Democratic League of Kosovo	5,117	12.37	4
Albanian Christian Democratic Party of Kosovo	3,927	9.49	3
Levizja Vetëvendosje!	2,442	5.90	2
Justice Party	1,140	2.75	1
Democratic Christian Party for Integration	741	1.79	1
New Democratic Initiative of Kosovo	461	1.11	–
Movement for Unification	223	0.54	–
Civic Initiative Srpska	147	0.36	–
National Front of Kosovo	91	0.22	–
Social Democratic Party of Kosovo	56	0.14	–
Total	41,381	100.00	35

==== Deçan ====
Mayoral results
Candidate	Party	Votes	%
Rasim Selmanaj (incumbent)	Alliance for the Future of Kosovo–Democratic League of Dardania (Affiliation: Alliance for the Future of Kosovo)	8,669	54.26
Blerim Bajraktaraj	Democratic League of Kosovo	5,555	34.77
Xhevdet Hasanmetaj	Democratic Party of Kosovo	1,078	6.75
Bilall Hadërgjonaj	Levizja Vetëvendosje!	676	4.23
Total		15,978	100.00

Rasim Selmanaj resigned as mayor of Deçan in July 2017 after being elected to the Assembly of the Republic of Kosovo. Sami Cacaj of the Alliance for the Future of Kosovo became acting mayor pending the 2017 Kosovan local elections.

Municipal assembly results
Party	Votes	%	Seats
Alliance for the Future of Kosovo–Democratic League of Dardania	7,170	48.83	13
Democratic League of Kosovo	4,532	30.86	9
Democratic Party of Kosovo	1,854	12.63	3
Levizja Vetëvendosje!	799	5.44	2
Justice Party	159	1.08	–
Albanian Christian Democratic Party of Kosovo	87	0.59	–
National Front of Kosovo	83	0.57	–
Total	14,684	100.00	27

==== Junik ====
Mayoral results
Candidate	Party	First round		Second round	
Candidate	Party	Votes	%	Votes	%
Agron Kuçi (incumbent)	Alliance for the Future of Kosovo–Democratic League of Dardania (Affiliation: Alliance for the Future of Kosovo)	1,209	47.81	1,414	62.46
Zenun Shala	Democratic League of Kosovo	823	32.54	850	37.54
Rexhep Pepshi	Levizja Vetëvendosje!	316	12.50		
Nimon Tofaj	Democratic Party of Kosovo	181	7.16		
Total		2,529	100.00	2,264	100.00

Municipal assembly results
Party	Votes	%	Seats
Alliance for the Future of Kosovo–Democratic League of Dardania	895	37.62	6
Democratic League of Kosovo	832	34.97	5
Levizja Vetëvendosje!	363	15.26	2
Democratic Party of Kosovo	289	12.15	2
Total	2,379	100.00	15

==== Rahovec ====
Mayoral results
Candidate	Party	First round		Second round	
Candidate	Party	Votes	%	Votes	%
Idriz Vehapi	Democratic Party of Kosovo	9,609	38.65	11,890	52.38
Smajl Latifi (incumbent)	Alliance for the Future of Kosovo–Democratic League of Dardania (Affiliation: Alliance for the Future of Kosovo)	8,169	32.86	10,810	47.62
Fahredin Shehu	Democratic League of Kosovo	5,512	22.17		
Dervish Çadraku	Levizja Vetëvendosje!	847	3.41		
Sinan Ejupi	New Kosovo Alliance	352	1.42		
Bojan Nakalamić	New Strength	296	1.19		
Irfan Cana	Civic Initiative "Ndryshe Rahovec"	75	0.30		
Total		24,860	100.00	22,700	100.00

Municipal assembly results
Party	Votes	%	Seats
Democratic Party of Kosovo	7,953	34.93	11
Alliance for the Future of Kosovo–Democratic League of Dardania	5,885	25.84	8
Democratic League of Kosovo	5,090	22.35	7
Levizja Vetëvendosje!	1,430	6.28	2
New Kosovo Alliance	733	3.22	1
Movement for Unification	601	2.64	1
Justice Party	410	1.80	1
Civic Initiative Srpska	326	1.43	–
Social Democracy	83	0.36	–
Independent Liberal Party	82	0.36	–
New Strength	69	0.30	–
Civic Initiative "Other Rahovec"	64	0.28	–
New Democratic Initiative of Kosovo	45	0.20	–
Total	22,771	100.00	31

=== Mitrovica District ===
==== Leposavić ====
Mayoral results
Candidate	Party	Votes	%
Dragan Jablanović	Civic Initiative Srpska	2,225	51.48
Blagoje Nedeljković	Democratic Initiative	940	21.75
Dragiša Krstović	Independent Liberal Party	538	12.45
Radomir Veličković	Civic Initiative "SDP - Oliver Ivanović"	244	5.65
Nenad Radosavljević	People's Justice	209	4.84
Slađan Kostić	Civic Initiative "Together"	166	3.84
Total		4,322	100.00

In addition to being elected mayor of Leposavić in the Republic of Kosovo's electoral system, Dragan Jablanović was also recognized by Serbia as the leader of a parallel provisional authority. He became a founding member of the Serb List in 2014. He was removed as leader of the provisional authority the following year at his own request, amid the backdrop of serious divisions in the Serb List, and was replaced by Zoran Tomić. Jablanović continued to serve as Leposavić's mayor as recognized by the Republic of Kosovo, and in 2017 he joined the Party of Kosovo Serbs. Jablanović's various political affiliations in these years corresponded to those of his son, Aleksandar Jablanović.

Municipal assembly results
Party	Votes	%	Seats
Civic Initiative Srpska	1,628	38.73	8
Democratic Initiative	814	19.37	4
Independent Liberal Party	445	10.59	2
Civic Initiative "SDP - Oliver Ivanović"	300	7.14	2
Civic Initiative "Together"	232	5.52	1
People's Justice	217	5.16	1
Initiative for a Better Life	175	4.16	1
Alliance for the Future of Kosovo–Democratic League of Dardania	88	2.09	–
Democratic Party of Kosovo	83	1.97	–
Bosniak Party for Democratic Action of Kosovo	70	1.67	–
Democratic League of Kosovo	66	1.57	–
Social Democracy	47	1.12	–
New Strength	23	0.55	–
Levizja Vetëvendosje!	15	0.36	–
Total	4,203	100.00	19

==== Mitrovica ====
===== South Mitrovica =====
Mayoral results
Candidate	Party	First round		Second round	
Candidate	Party	Votes	%	Votes	%
Agim Bahtiri	New Kosovo Alliance	6,483	21.90	12,479	52.27
Avni Kastrati (incumbent)	Democratic Party of Kosovo	12,608	42.60	11,394	47.73
Mehdi Jonuzi	Democratic League of Kosovo	5,972	20.18		
Faruk Mujka	Levizja Vetëvendosje!	2,259	7.63		
Shaban Dragaj	Alliance for the Future of Kosovo–Democratic League of Dardania	1,039	3.51		
Nexhmedin Spahiu	Independents of Mitrovica	833	2.81		
Vesel Neziri	Justice Party	402	1.36		
Total		29,596	100.00	23,873	100.00

Municipal assembly results
Party	Votes	%	Seats
Democratic Party of Kosovo	10,375	38.79	14
Democratic League of Kosovo	6,081	22.73	8
New Kosovo Alliance	3,671	13.72	5
Levizja Vetëvendosje!	2,086	7.80	3
Alliance for the Future of Kosovo–Democratic League of Dardania	1,824	6.82	2
Independents of Mitrovica	905	3.38	1
Justice Party	577	2.16	1
Turkish Democratic Party of Kosovo	398	1.49	1
Movement for Unification	376	1.41	–
Democratic Ashkali Party of Kosovo	148	0.55	–
Bosniak Party for Democratic Action of Kosovo	124	0.46	–
Ashkali Party for Integration	108	0.40	–
New Democratic Party	76	0.28	–
Total	26,749	100.00	35

===== North Mitrovica =====
Mayoral results
Candidate	Party	First round		Second round	
Candidate	Party	Votes	%	Votes	%
Krstimir Pantić	Civic Initiative Srpska	2,173	36.89	2,293	54.38
Oliver Ivanović	Civic Initiative "SDP - Oliver Ivanović"	1,670	28.35	1,924	45.62
Agim Deva	Democratic Party of Kosovo	1,190	20.20		
Adrijana Hodžić	Independent	727	12.34		
Dimitrije Janićijević	Independent Liberal Party	130	2.21		
Total		5,890	100.00	4,217	100.00

Municipal assembly results
Party	Votes	%	Seats
Civic Initiative Srpska	1,855	33.40	6
Civic Initiative "SDP - Oliver Ivanović"	1,808	32.55	6
Democratic Party of Kosovo	800	14.40	3
Democratic League of Kosovo	282	5.08	1
Alliance for the Future of Kosovo–Democratic League of Dardania	186	3.35	1
Independent Liberal Party	186	3.35	1
Bosniak Party for Democratic Action of Kosovo	170	3.06	1
Levizja Vetëvendosje!	151	2.72	–
New Kosovo Alliance	60	1.08	–
Turkish Democratic Party of Kosovo	33	0.59	–
Justice Party	23	0.41	–
Total	5,554	100.00	19

==== Skenderaj ====
Mayoral results
Candidate	Party	Votes	%
Sami Lushtaku (incumbent)	Democratic Party of Kosovo	17,825	88.21
Ajnishahe Halimi	Levizja Vetëvendosje!	1,145	5.67
Cenë Behrami	Democratic League of Kosovo	437	2.16
Ramiz Polaci	New Kosovo Alliance	404	2.00
Qazim Xani	Alliance for the Future of Kosovo–Democratic League of Dardania	277	1.37
Musli Ahmeti	Social Movement of Kosovo	119	0.59
Total		20,207	100.00

Municipal assembly results
Party	Votes	%	Seats
Democratic Party of Kosovo	15,653	81.74	26
Levizja Vetëvendosje!	813	4.25	1
Democratic League of Kosovo	537	2.80	1
Alliance for the Future of Kosovo–Democratic League of Dardania	446	2.33	1
Justice Party	370	1.93	1
New Kosovo Alliance	364	1.90	1
Arben Thaqi	265	1.38	–
Social Movement of Kosovo	190	0.99	–
Hysni Rexhepi	185	0.97	–
Movement for Unification	184	0.96	–
Democratic Alternative of Kosovo	142	0.74	–
Total	19,149	100.00	31

==== Vushtrri ====
Mayoral results
Candidate	Party	First round		Second round	
Candidate	Party	Votes	%	Votes	%
Bajram Mulaku (incumbent)	Democratic Party of Kosovo	11,838	38.99	10,329	55.20
Muharrem Shabani	Alliance for the Future of Kosovo–Democratic League of Dardania (Affiliation: Alliance for the Future of Kosovo)	6,801	22.40	8,384	44.80
Refik Ramaj	Democratic League of Kosovo	6,722	22.14		
Xhemajl Pllana	Levizja Vetëvendosje!	3,383	11.14		
Avdullah Klinaku	Justice Party	1,241	4.09		
Remzi Selimi	Movement for Unification	373	1.23		
Total		30,358	100.00	18,713	100.00

Municipal assembly results
Party	Votes	%	Seats
Democratic Party of Kosovo	9,641	34.64	12
Democratic League of Kosovo	5,418	19.47	7
Alliance for the Future of Kosovo–Democratic League of Dardania	5,084	18.27	6
Levizja Vetëvendosje!	2,837	10.19	3
Justice Party	1,324	4.76	2
New Kosovo Alliance	1,263	4.54	2
Civic Initiative Srpska	538	1.93	1
Movement for Unification	520	1.87	1
Turkish Democratic Party of Kosovo	492	1.77	1
Independent Liberal Party	326	1.17	–
Common Future	283	1.02	–
Kosovo Turkish Justice Party	107	0.38	–
Total	27,833	100.00	35

==== Zubin Potok ====
Mayoral results
Candidate	Party	Votes	%
Stevan Vulović	Civic Initiative Srpska	2,126	78.74
Qerkin Veseli	Democratic League of Kosovo	299	11.07
Izmir Zeqiri	Democratic Party of Kosovo	207	7.67
Branislav Božović	New Strength	68	2.52
Total		2,700	100.00

Vulović subsequently joined the Serb List.

Municipal assembly results
Party	Votes	%	Seats
Civic Initiative Srpska	1,961	74.96	11
Democratic League of Kosovo	275	10.51	2
Democratic Party of Kosovo	199	7.61	1
Social Democracy	100	3.82	1
New Strength	53	2.03	–
Alliance for the Future of Kosovo–Democratic League of Dardania	28	1.07	–
Total	2,616	100.00	15

==== Zvečan ====
Mayoral results
Candidate	Party	Votes	%
Vučina Janković	Civic Initiative Srpska	480	57.55
Nebojša Vlajić	Civic Initiative "SDP - Oliver Ivanović"	354	42.45
Total		834	100.00

Janković subsequently joined the Serb List.

Municipal assembly results
Party	Votes	%	Seats
Civic Initiative Srpska	824	51.44	8
Civic Initiative "SDP - Oliver Ivanović"	585	36.52	5
Alliance for the Future of Kosovo–Democratic League of Dardania	85	5.31	1
Democratic Party of Kosovo	79	4.93	1
Levizja Vetëvendosje!	29	1.81	–
Total	1,602	100.00	15

=== Peja District ===
==== Peja ====
Mayoral results
Candidate	Party	First round		Second round	
Candidate	Party	Votes	%	Votes	%
Gazmend Muhaxheri	Democratic League of Kosovo	17,200	40.97	23,211	56.37
Ali Berisha (incumbent)	Alliance for the Future of Kosovo–Democratic League of Dardania (Affiliation: Alliance for the Future of Kosovo)	15,269	36.37	17,967	43.63
Muhamet Halitaj	Democratic Party of Kosovo	6,392	15.23		
Hivzi Muharremi	Levizja Vetëvendosje!	1,638	3.90		
Myhedin Sylqa	Justice Party	998	2.38		
Gazmir Raci	Democratic Alternative of Kosovo	197	0.47		
Arsim Belegu	New Kosovo Alliance	160	0.38		
Dreshai Ramé	Social Movement of Kosovo	125	0.30		
Total		41,979	100.00	41,178	100.00

Municipal assembly results
Party	Votes	%	Seats
Democratic League of Kosovo	11,514	29.60	10
Alliance for the Future of Kosovo–Democratic League of Dardania	11,283	29.00	10
Democratic Party of Kosovo	6,556	16.85	6
Levizja Vetëvendosje!	2,193	5.64	2
Justice Party	1,677	4.31	2
New Kosovo Alliance	783	2.01	1
New Democratic Initiative of Kosovo	734	1.89	1
Civic Initiative Srpska	708	1.82	1
SDA–SDSG	674	1.73	1
Vakat Coalition	667	1.71	1
Albanian Christian Democratic Party of Kosovo	404	1.04	–
Initiative: Sabahudin Ciriković	394	1.01	–
Democratic Alternative of Kosovo	263	0.68	–
Social Movement of Kosovo	209	0.54	–
Democratic Christian Party for Integration	178	0.46	–
Independent Liberal Party	160	0.41	–
National Front of Kosovo	142	0.37	–
United Roma Party of Kosovo	117	0.30	–
Montenegrin People's Party of Kosovo	74	0.19	–
New Strength	71	0.18	–
Bosniak Party of Democratic Action of Kosovo	68	0.17	–
Montenegrin Liberal Party	35	0.09	–
Total	38,904	100.00	35

==== Istog ====
Mayoral results
Candidate	Party	Votes	%
Haki Rugova (incumbent)	Democratic League of Kosovo	10,223	50.95
Donika Kadaj Bujupi	Alliance for the Future of Kosovo–Democratic League of Dardania (Affiliation: Alliance for the Future of Kosovo)	5,789	28.85
Shasivar Haxhijaj	Democratic Party of Kosovo	3,109	15.50
Florin Dreshaj	Levizja Vetëvendosje!	511	2.55
Teuta Hasani	New Kosovo Alliance	431	2.15
Total		20,063	100.00

Municipal assembly results
Party	Votes	%	Seats
Democratic League of Kosovo	8,146	43.07	12
Alliance for the Future of Kosovo–Democratic League of Dardania	4,472	23.65	6
Democratic Party of Kosovo	2,822	14.92	4
Levizja Vetëvendosje!	666	3.52	1
Arif Elshani	511	2.70	1
New Kosovo Alliance	426	2.25	1
Civic Initiative Srpska	353	1.87	1
Civic Initiative "Bosniak Istog"	352	1.86	1
New Democratic Initiative of Kosovo	330	1.74	–
Independent Liberal Party	241	1.27	–
Justice Party	233	1.23	–
SDA–SDSG	184	0.97	–
Social Democracy	56	0.30	–
Albanian Christian Democratic Party of Kosovo	52	0.27	–
Vakat Coalition	43	0.23	–
Bosniak Party of Democratic Action of Kosovo	25	0.13	–
Total	18,912	100.00	27

==== Klina ====
Mayoral results
Candidate	Party	First round		Second round	
Candidate	Party	Votes	%	Votes	%
Sokol Bashota (incumbent)	Democratic Party of Kosovo	7,976	42.52	6,864	75.12
Enver Berisha	Alliance for the Future of Kosovo–Democratic League of Dardania (Affiliation: Alliance for the Future of Kosovo)	4,575	24.39	2,273	24.88
Fadil Gashi	Democratic League of Kosovo	4,463	23.79		
Prend Buzhala	Albanian Christian Democratic Party of Kosovo	746	3.98		
Avni Gashi	New Kosovo Alliance	512	2.73		
Hajzer Idrizi	Levizja Vetëvendosje!	387	2.06		
Filip Berisha	Christian Democratic Party of Integration	100	0.53		
Total		18,759	100.00	9,137	100.00

Municipal assembly results
Party	Votes	%	Seats
Democratic Party of Kosovo	5,450	30.90	9
Democratic League of Kosovo	3,497	19.83	5
Alliance for the Future of Kosovo–Democratic League of Dardania	3,262	18.50	5
Civic Initiative "Klina"	1,466	8.31	2
Initiative for the Advancement of Klina	1,092	6.19	2
Albanian Christian Democratic Party of Kosovo	736	4.17	1
Levizja Vetëvendosje!	483	2.74	1
New Kosovo Alliance	432	2.45	1
Civic Initiative Srpska	398	2.26	1
Zafer Gashi	260	1.47	–
Social Democracy	183	1.04	–
Justice Party	179	1.01	–
Democratic Christian Party for Integration	110	0.62	–
New Democratic Initiative of Kosovo	88	0.50	–
Total	17,636	100.00	27

== Oaths controversy in North Mitrovica, Pantić resignation and 3rd election ==
All candidates who won elections had to sign a swearing in and oath paper that contained symbols of the Republic of Kosovo. In Serbian areas, a piece of paper was taped over the symbols so that Serbs would sign them without incident. Krstimir Pantić, mayor-elect of North Mitrovica, took the paper off the symbols, declared he would never sign them and resigned. A new election for North Mitrovica was scheduled for February 23, 2014. Goran Rakić won the election on February 23. He campaigned that he would sign the oath.

Mayoral results
Candidate	Party	Votes	%
Goran Rakić	Civic Initiative Srpska	2,778	52.84
Oliver Ivanović	Civic Initiative "SDP - Oliver Ivanović"	1,452	27.62
Florent Azemi	Democratic Party of Kosovo	567	10.79
Musa Myftari	Democratic League of Kosovo	460	8.75
Total		5,257	100.00

Rakić subsequently joined the Serb List, becoming its leader in July 2017.

== See also ==
- Government of Kosovo
- Brussels Agreement (2013)
- Municipalities of Kosovo
