= Fadil Geci =

Kosov politician (born 1961)

Fadil Geci (born 19 March 1961) is a politician in Kosovo. A member of the Kosovo Liberation Army (KLA) in the 1998–99 Kosovo War, Geci served in the Assembly of Kosovo from 2001 to 2007, at first as a member of the Democratic League of Kosovo (LDK) and later with the breakaway Democratic League of Dardania (LDD).

== Early life and career ==
Geci was born to a Kosovo Albanian family in the village of Llaushë in the municipality of Skenderaj, in what was then the Autonomous Region of Kosovo and Metohija in the People's Republic of Serbia, Federal People's Republic of Yugoslavia. He holds a law degree. He is the brother of Gani Geci.

== Kosovo War ==
Geci was a member of the LDK presidency in the late 1990s. In the early period of the Kosovo War, he provided reports for the Albanian media on developments in Skenderaj. In a March 1998 report for a television station in Tirana, he said that there were food and medical shortages in the area and that Serbian snipers were "fir[ing] at anything that moves" in certain villages, including Llaushë. He also provided news reports for the Kosovo Information Centre, one of the parallel institutions established by the Kosovo Albanian community during its boycott of Serbian state institutions in the 1990s. He briefly relocated to Priština later in 1998; a news report indicates that he and several members of his family returned to Llaushë at around the end of October to reconstruct their home, which had been destroyed by bombardment.

In 2018, Geci said that he had founded a KLA group called Hasan Prishtina with Adem Jashari and Sali Çekaj at the beginning of the Kosovo War and was a leader of its activities in Drenica. The existence of Hasan Prishtina had previously been questioned, with some contending it was invented retroactively to secure pension payments from the Kosovo government.

== Politician ==
The Kosovo War ended in 1999, and a provisional administration was established by the United Nations Interim Administration Mission in Kosovo (UNMIK). In February 2000, the local UNMIK administrator in Skenderaj appointed Geci as second vice-president of the municipal administrative board, a position that was roughly equivalent to deputy mayor.

Geci appeared in the second position on the LDK's electoral list for Skenderaj in the 2000 Kosovan local elections and was elected when the list won four seats in the municipal assembly. The rival Democratic Party of Kosovo (PDK) won a majority victory, and the LDK served afterward in opposition. Geci did not seek re-election in 2002.

Geci condemned a bomb attack that killed eleven members of Kosovo's Serb community in February 2001. He was quoted as saying, "We had a meeting in the village and decided it was the worst, most cowardly thing what happened. We must find who did this. It would be easier to breathe freely and for the internationals to do their job if we do." He was reported to have risked a backlash for his comments, and he said that he believed his life was in danger from hardline elements the Albanian community. In the same period, he accused Hashim Thaçi and his associates of being responsible for much of the ongoing violence in Kosovo. Thaçi rejected the charge.

=== Parliamentarian ===
Geci appeared in the thirteenth position on the LDK's list in the 2001 parliamentary election, which was held under closed list proportional representation, and was elected when the party won forty-seven seats. The LDK won a convincing victory overall and afterward formed a coalition government. Geci served as a supporter of the administration and was a member of the assembly's budget committee and emergency preparedness committee.

He took part in a seven-member delegation to the United States of America in October 2002 to research American political institutions. At a meeting with journalists in Salt Lake City, he indicated his support for the impending American invasion of Iraq.

In May 2003, Geci and PDK lawmaker Gani Koci fought each other in a parliamentary hallway. The PDK blamed Geci for the confrontation and walked out of the assembly in protest.

Geci appeared in the fourteenth position on the LDK's list in the 2004 parliamentary election and was re-elected when the list won forty-seven mandates. The LDK remained the dominant force in Kosovo's coalition government after the election, and Geci continued to serve as an administration supporter. In his second term, he was a member of the security committee.

It was reported in October 2006 that Geci had physically assaulted Kosovo Polje mayor Skender Zogaj.

The LDK divided into different factions in the leadership battle that followed Ibrahim Rugova's death in 2006. In January 2007, Geci and five other members of the LDK's assembly group left the party to join the newly formed LDD. He was not a candidate in the 2007 parliamentary election but ran for mayor of Skenderaj in the concurrent local elections and finished a distant second. He ran for mayor again in the 2009 local elections with the same result and has not returned to active political life since this time.

Fadil Geci stood as a candidate for the LDK with 42 as his candidate number in Kosovo's parliamentary election on 7 June 2026 but was not elected to parliament.

== Electoral record ==
=== Local ===
2009 Kosovan local elections: Mayor of Skenderaj
Candidate	Party	Votes	%
Sami Lushtaku (incumbent)	Democratic Party of Kosovo	25,017	85.02
Fadil Geci	Democratic League of Dardania	3,171	10.78
Rushit Haliti	Alliance for the Future of Kosovo	528	1.79
Abit Haziraj	Green Party of Kosovo	390	1.33
Liridon Hoti	Socialist Party of Kosovo	318	1.08
Total		29,424	100.00

2007 Kosovan local elections: Mayor of Skenderaj
Candidate	Party	Votes	%
Sami Lushtaku	Democratic Party of Kosovo	18,338	80.50
Fadil Geci	Democratic League of Dardania	2,842	12.48
Basri Lushtaku	New Kosovo Alliance	768	3.37
Rushit Haliti	Independent	424	1.86
Kemail Shaqiri	Alliance for the Future of Kosovo	407	1.79
Total		22,779	100.00
