= Hajdar Beqa =

Kosovo politician

Hajdar Beqa (born 5 January 1978) is a politician in Kosovo, currently serving his third term in the Assembly of the Republic of Kosovo. He is a member of the Democratic Party of Kosovo (PDK).

== Early life and career ==
Beqa was born to an Albanian family in Gjakova, in what was then the Socialist Autonomous Province of Kosovo in the Socialist Republic of Serbia, Socialist Federal Republic of Yugoslavia. He was a member of the Kosovo Liberation Army (KLA) in the Kosovo War (1998–99).

Beqa holds a bachelor's degree in law from the University of Pristina and a master's degree in diplomacy from South East European University. He was a professional associate in the municipal prosecutor's office in Pristina in 2005–06 and was the head of the deputy prime minister's cabinet in 2008–09.

== Politician ==
=== Early candidacies (2010, 2013) ===
Beqa appeared in the seventy-seventh position on the Democratic Party of Kosovo's electoral list in the 2010 Kosovan parliamentary election. Assembly elections in Kosovo are held under open list proportional representation; Beqa finished in thirty-eighth place among the PDK's candidates and missed election when the list won thirty-four seats. He later ran for mayor in the Gjakova in the 2013 Kosovan local elections and finished in third place.

=== Parliamentarian (2014–19) ===
Beqa was promoted to fifty-third on the PDK's list in the Kosovan parliamentary election and finished in thirty-third place. The PDK won thirty-seven seats and afterward formed a coalition government with the Democratic League of Kosovo (LDK). Beqa was not immediately elected due to a requirement for one-third female representation, but he received a seat as the replacement for a newly appointed cabinet minister in December 2014. In his first term, he served on the committee for the supervision of public finances.

Relations between government and opposition parliamentarians were often very poor in the 2014–17 term. Several opposition members opened tear gas canisters during assembly debates, and on one occasion Beqa threw a bottle at Albin Kurti of Vetëvendosje. In 2017, Beqa was criticized for referring to a female opposition member as a "political prostitute."

The PDK formed an alliance with the Alliance for the Future of Kosovo (AAK) for the 2017 parliamentary election. Beqa appeared in the seventy-seventh position on their combined list, finished in twenty-ninth place among their candidates, and was re-elected when the list won thirty-nine seats. The PDK–AAK alliance formed a new government after the election, and Beqa continued to serve as a government supporter. For this term, he was deputy chair of the committee for legislation, mandate, immunities, rules of the assembly, and supervision of the Anti-Corruption Agency.

In June 2019, Beqa declared assets of almost a million dollars.

He appeared in the thirty-fourth position on the PDK's list in the 2019 parliamentary election and finished twenty-fourth. The list won twenty-four seats, and he once again missed election due to the one-third female membership requirement. This time, he did not receive a replacement mandate.

=== Return to parliament (2021–present) ===
Beqa was given the twenty-eighth position on the PDK's list for the 2021 parliamentary election, finished thirteenth, and was elected when the list won nineteen seats. Vetëvendosje won a significant victory, and the PDK now serves in opposition. Beqa is a member of the committee for public finances and once again serves on the legislation committee.

In 2022, Beqa was appointed as chair of a special committee to investigate capital investments in the Kosovo Energy Corporation following the privatization of its distribution unit.

Beqa has been accused of assaulting Republic of Kosovo finance minister Hekuran Murati during a confrontation in parliament on 13 July 2023.

== Electoral record ==
=== Local (Gjakova) ===
2013 Kosovan local elections: Mayor of Gjakova
Candidate	Party	First round		Second round	
Candidate	Party	Votes	%	Votes	%
Mimoza Kusari Lila	New Kosovo Alliance	20,160	43.95	25,183	52.38
Pal Lekaj (incumbent)	Alliance for the Future of Kosovo–Democratic League of Dardania (Affiliation: Alliance for the Future of Kosovo)	16,376	35.70	22,890	47.62
Hajdar Beqa	Democratic Party of Kosovo	5,574	12.15		
Luan Gola	Democratic League of Kosovo	2,926	6.38		
Arberije Nagavci	Levizja Vetëvendosje!	830	1.81		
Total		45,866	100.00	48,073	100.00
