= Rasim Selmanaj =

Kosovan politician and writer

- Selmanaj in 2017

Mayor of Deçan
- In office 2009–2017

Personal details
- Born: 8 March 1963 (age 63)

Rasim Selmanaj (born 8 March 1963) is a politician and writer in Kosovo. He was the mayor of Deçan from 2009 to 2017 and has served three terms in the Assembly of the Republic of Kosovo. A prominent youth leader in the Democratic League of Kosovo (LDK) during the 1990s, Selmanaj has been a member of the Alliance for the Future of Kosovo (AAK) since 2001.

== Early life and career ==
Selmanaj was born to an Albanian family in the village of Gllogjan in Deçan, in what was then the Autonomous Region of Kosovo and Metohija in the People's Republic of Serbia, Federal People's Republic of Yugoslavia. He was involved in protests by the Kosovo Albanian student community in the early 1980s and was a founding member of the nationalist Shqiponja organization. He became the first leader of the LDK's Youth Forum in Deçan in the early 1990s and during this time oversaw the journal Zgjimi. Selmanaj was imprisoned by the Serbian authorities in 1981, 1983, and 1992.

Selmanaj was arrested by Serbian police as a "terrorist" on 24 March 1998 and was kept in prison for the remainder of the Kosovo War (1998–99). He was released in 2001.

He holds a bachelor's degree.

== Author and publisher ==
Selmanaj was the publisher and editor-in-chief of the daily newspaper 24 Orê until January 2003 and the weekly Focus from 2001 to 2009. He has written several books, including collections of prose and poetry.

== Politician ==
Selmanaj was appointed as the AAK's leader for the Metohija region following his release from prison and later served on the party's presidency. He appeared in the forty-third position on the AAK's electoral list in the 2001 Kosovan parliamentary election, which was held under closed list proportional representation. The list won eight seats, and he was not elected. He was promoted to the twenty-fifth position for the 2004 parliamentary election and was again not elected when the list won nine seats.

=== First assembly term (2007–09) ===
Kosovo adopted a system of open list proportional representation prior to the 2007 parliamentary election. Selmanaj appeared in the fifteenth position on the AAK's list, finished sixth among its candidates, and was elected when the list won ten seats. The Democratic Party of Kosovo (PDK) won the election and afterward formed a new coalition government with the LDK, while the AAK served in opposition. Kosovo unilaterally declared independence in February 2008, and Selmanaj was one of the signatories of its declaration.

In April 2009, Selmanaj was an organizer of a public event in Deçan supporting Albania's entry into the North Atlantic Treaty Organization (NATO).

=== Mayor of Deçan (2009–17) ===
Selmanaj elected as mayor of Deçan in 2009 Kosovan local elections. As he could not hold a dual mandate, he resigned from parliament on being sworn in.

In June 2012, Selmanaj personally accompanied staff members from the Visoki Dečani, a Serbian Orthodox Church monastery in Deçan, as they applied for Republic of Kosovo registry papers. The church's engagement with the Pristina authorities was seen as significant, as it has not recognized Kosovo's declaration of independence. The following year, Selmanaj opposed a Kosovo Supreme Court decision legitimating the transfer of twenty-three hectares of land to the monastery.

Selmanaj was re-elected as mayor in the 2013 local elections. In late 2014, he condemned an act of sectarian vandalism by Albanian nationalist extremists at the Visoki Dečani monastery. In July 2015, the Special Chamber of the Supreme Court of Kosovo controversially overturned the monastery's claims to the disputed twenty-three hectares; Selmanaj described this decision as "fair and honest."

He resigned as mayor in July 2017 after returning to parliament.

=== Return to parliament (2017–21) ===
The PDK and AAK formed an alliance for the 2017 Kosovan parliamentary election, and Selmanaj appeared in the ninety-second position on their combined list. He finished thirty-first among the list's candidates and was elected to a second assembly term when the list won thirty-nine seats. The PDK and AAK formed an alliance after the election, and Selmanaj served as a government supporter. He was a member of the committee for rights, community interests, and returns, and the committee for public administration, local government, and media.

Selmanaj appeared in the fifty-second position on the AAK's list in the 2019 Kosovan parliamentary election, finished sixth among the party's candidates, and was re-elected when the list won thirteen seats. Vetëvendosje (VV) won the election and initially formed a coalition government with the LDK, with the AAK serving in opposition. This government fell after less than a month, and the LDK formed a new coalition with the AAK in June 2020. Selmanaj once again served as a government supporter and was a member of the committee for local government, public administration, regional development, and media, and the committee for agriculture, forestry, rural development, infrastructure, and environment.

The LDK–AAK administration fell in December 2020, and a new parliamentary election was held in February 2021. Selmanaj appeared eighth on the AAK list, finished fifteenth, and was not re-elected when the party fell to eight seats. Selmanaj resigned from all positions in the AAK after the election, while remaining a member of the party.

== Published works (up to 2014) ==
- Shtegtar i Lirisë (2001; poetry)
- Melodi shiu në sytë e nënës (2003; poetry)
- Peizazh i ëndrrës (2004; prose)
- Kur kalëroj kujtesën (2005; poetry)
- Kitarë e Krisur (2006; compilation)
- Shpirti i lagur më Lot (2006; poetry)
- Haradinaj dhe Haga (2006)
- Heroi me kitarë (2007)
- Me Ramushin
- Hijet e Thyera
- Duam kthimin tënd

== Electoral record ==
=== Local (Deçan) ===
2013 Kosovan local elections: Mayor of Deçan
Candidate	Party	Votes	%
Rasim Selmanaj (incumbent)	Alliance for the Future of Kosovo–Democratic League of Dardania (Affiliation: Alliance for the Future of Kosovo)	8,669	54.26
Blerim Bajraktaraj	Democratic League of Kosovo	5,555	34.77
Xhevdet Hasanmetaj	Democratic Party of Kosovo	1,078	6.75
Bilall Hadërgjonaj	Levizja Vetëvendosje!	676	4.23
Total		15,978	100.00

2009 Kosovan local elections: Mayor of Deçan
Candidate	Party	Votes	%
Rasim Selmanaj	Alliance for the Future of Kosovo	9,899	67.82
Mehmet Bojkaj	Democratic League of Kosovo	2,727	18.68
Musë Mushkolaj	Democratic Party of Kosovo	890	6.10
Ismet Hulaj	Democratic League of Dardania	554	3.80
Tahir Kuçi	Social Democratic Party of Kosovo	526	3.60
Total		14,596	100.00
