= Donika Kadaj Bujupi =

Kosovo politician

Member of the Assembly of Kosovo
- In office 2007–2021

Advisor to the President of Kosovo
- Incumbent
- Assumed office April 2023
- President: Vjosa Osmani

Personal details
- Born: 20 March 1979 (age 47) Sarajevo, Socialist Republic of Bosnia and Herzegovina, Socialist Federal Republic of Yugoslavia
- Party: Alliance for the Future of Kosovo (2007–2016, 2018–present); Vetëvendosje (2016–2018)
- Education: AAB University; Kosovo Institute of Journalism and Communication

Donika Kadaj Bujupi (born 20 March 1979) is a Kosovan politician who served as member of the Assembly of Kosovo from 2007 to 2021 and was appointed as an advisor to Republic of Kosovo president Vjosa Osmani in 2023. Kadaj Bujupi was a member of the Alliance for the Future of Kosovo (AAK) for most of her time as an elected official, although from 2016 to 2018 she was a member of Vetëvendosje (VV).

== Early life and career ==
Kadaj Bujupi was born in Sarajevo, in what was then the Socialist Republic of Bosnia and Herzegovina in the Socialist Federal Republic of Yugoslavia. When she was five years old, she moved with her family to her father's homeland of Kosovo (which was then the Socialist Autonomous Province of Kosovo in the Socialist Republic of Serbia, also part of Yugoslavia). She holds a bachelor's degree in journalism and mass communication from AAB University (2005) and a master's degree in the same field from the Kosovo Institute of Journalism and Communication (2007).

Kadaj Bujupi worked for Médecins Sans Frontières from 2000 to 2001, for the city of Pristina from 2001 to 2002, and for the United Nations Interim Administration Mission in Kosovo (UNMIK) from 2002 to 2005. From 2005 to 2007, she was a spokesperson for the Kosovo Energy Corporation. In December 2005, she rejected charges that the energy corporation was discriminating against Serb communities in Kosovo.

== Parliamentarian ==
=== Alliance for the Future of Kosovo ===
==== First term (2007–11) ====
Kadaj Bujupi appeared in the thirtieth position on the Alliance for the Future of Kosovo's electoral list in the 2007 Kosovan parliamentary election. Parliamentary elections in Kosovo are held under open list proportional representation, and she finished in twelfth place among the party's candidates. The AAK won ten seats; due to a requirement for one-third female representation, she was awarded a mandate. The Democratic Party of Kosovo (PDK) and the Democratic League of Kosovo (LDK) formed a coalition government after the election, and the AAK served in opposition. In her first term, Kadaj Bujupi was a member of the committee for education, science, technology, culture, youth, and sports. She was a serving parliamentarian in February 2008, when Kosovo's assembly and governing authorities unilaterally declared independence for the territory as the Republic of Kosovo.

In June 2008, Kadaj Bujupi accused Kosovo's ministry of mines and energy of inefficiency and a lack of strategy for overcoming an ongoing energy crisis.

==== Second term (2011–14) ====
Kadaj Bujupi was promoted to the third position on the AAK's list in the 2010 Kosovan parliamentary election, finished fourth among the party's candidates, and was re-elected when the list won twelve seats. The PDK won the election and formed a new government, and the AAK remained in opposition. Kadaj Bujupi served on the committee for foreign affairs.

She expressed skepticism about a contract signed in late 2011 between the Kosovo government and the American firm Patton Boggs LLP to promote the international recognition of Kosovo. "Often these agreements are made for other, not state interests, and in most of the cases there is no transparency therefore suspicion is natural," she was quoted as saying.

In May 2014, Kadaj Bujupi was a founding member of a working group calling for the United Nations to establish a tribunal for victims of sexual violence during the Kosovo War.

==== Third term (2014–16) ====
Kadaj Bujupi appeared in the sixth position on the AAK's list in the 2014 Kosovan parliamentary election, again finished fourth, and was elected to a third term when the list won eleven seats. After protracted negotiations, the PDK, LDK, and smaller parties formed a new coalition government, and the AAK remained in opposition. Kadaj Bujupi was chosen as leader of the party's assembly group after the election.

In early 2015, Kadaj Bujupi introduced a seventeen-point draft resolution targeting illegal emigration from Kosovo to European Union (EU) countries. The resolution was approved by the assembly in a special plenary session on 6 February 2015.

Kadaj Bujupi was one of a number of parliamentarians who opened tear gas canisters in the assembly in October 2015, in protest against the Republic of Kosovo government's planned association agreement with Serbia and border resolution agreement with Montenegro. The following month, she and two other opposition parliamentarians set off another canister in a hallway that government delegates were using as an exit following a budget vote. She was subsequently placed under house arrest for a time. She defended her actions at a press conference in January 2016, describing the government's proposed agreements as unconstitutional and the government itself as illegitimate.

=== Vetëvendosje (2016–18) ===
Kadaj Bujupi resigned from the AAK in March 2016, after the party's decision to end its participation in the tear gas protests, and joined Vetëvendosje shortly thereafter. In 2016–17, she was a member of the stabilization and association committee and the committee on European integration.

She appeared in the ninth position on Vetëvendosje's list in the 2017 Kosovan parliamentary election, finished tenth among the party's candidates, and was re-elected when the list won thirty-two seats. A PDK–AAK coalition won the election, and Vetëvendosje emerged as the largest party in opposition.

In January 2018, Kadaj Bujupi and fellow Vetëvendosje parliamentarians Albin Kurti, Albulena Haxhiu, and Faton Topalli received suspended sentences of up to eighteen months for their previous actions in the Kosovo parliament. Under the terms of the ruling, they would not be required to serve jail time if they refrained from committing the same crime for a two-year probationary period.

=== Return to the Alliance for the Future of Kosovo (2018–2021) ===
Vetëvendosje experienced serious internal divisions after Albin Kurti was chosen as party leader in January 2018, and in March of that year Kadaj Bujupi returned to the AAK. The party was part of Kosovo's coalition government at this time, and she served as a government supporter in the legislature. Kadaj Bujupi was a member of the European integration committee and a commission of inquiry on expenses by the presidency and the government of Kosovo.

Kadaj Bujupi appeared in the ninth position on the AAK's list for the 2019 parliamentary election. On this occasion, she finished in twenty-first place. The party won thirteen seats, and, due to the requirement for one-third female representation, she received the party's final assembly mandate. She served on the committee on legislation, mandates, immunities, rules of procedure of the assembly, and oversight of the anti-corruption agency.

Vetëvendosje won the 2019 election; Albin Kurti formed a new coalition ministry afterward with the LDK, and the AAK once again served in opposition. Kurti's first administration fell from power in 2020, after which the LDK and AAK formed a new coalition government. Kadaj Bujupi did not personally support the coalition and abstained from voting for LDK leader Avdullah Hoti as prime minister. She was not a candidate in the 2021 parliamentary election.

== Municipal politics ==
Kadaj Bujupi ran for mayor of Istog in the 2013 Kosovan local elections, with a dual endorsement from the AAK and the Democratic League of Dardania (LDD). She finished second against incumbent mayor Haki Rugova from the LDK.

== Assistant to the president ==
Kadaj Bujupi was appointed as an advisor to Republic of Kosovo president Vjosa Osmani on 3 April 2023.

== Electoral record ==
=== Local (Istog) ===
2013 Kosovan local elections: Mayor of Istog
Candidate	Party	Votes	%
Haki Rugova (incumbent)	Democratic League of Kosovo	10,223	50.95
Donika Kadaj Bujupi	Alliance for the Future of Kosovo–Democratic League of Dardania (Affiliation: Alliance for the Future of Kosovo)	5,789	28.85
Shasivar Haxhijaj	Democratic Party of Kosovo	3,109	15.50
Florin Dreshaj	Levizja Vetëvendosje!	511	2.55
Teuta Hasani	New Kosovo Alliance	431	2.15
Total		20,063	100.00
