= Ibush Jonuzi =

Politician in Kosovo (born 1950)

Ibush Jonuzi (born 28 January 1950) is a politician in Kosovo. He participated in Ibrahim Rugova's parallel governing structures in the 1990s and served two terms in the Assembly of Kosovo. Jonuzi is a member of the Democratic League of Kosovo (LDK).

== Early life and career ==
Jonuzi was born to an Albanian family in the village of Pasoma in the municipality of Vushtrri, in what was then the Autonomous Region of Kosovo and Metohija in the People's Republic of Serbia, Federal People's Republic of Yugoslavia. He graduated from Boris Kidrić High Technical School in Kosovska Mitrovica in 1973 and began working in Trepča Mines in the same year, rising to the position of technical director. He was arrested in 1989 during a high-profile miner's strike amid the worsening political situation in the province.

He returned to Trepča in 2014 and worked as a deputy manager until his retirement.

== Politician ==
=== Parallel institutions and local assembly member ===
During the 1990s, most members of the Kosovo Albanian community boycotted Serbian state institutions and participated in parallel governing structures. Jonuzi was elected to the "parallel" parliament as a LDK member in the 1992 general election. In February 1998, he was elected to the LDK's general council. He assisted internally displaced Albanians from the Vushtrri area in the early period of the Kosovo War (1998–99).

Jonuzi appeared in the second position on the LDK's electoral list for Vushtrri in the 2000 Kosovan local elections and was elected when the list won twenty mandates. He served for one term and did not seek re-election in 2002.

=== Parliamentarian ===
Jonuzi appeared in the twenty-eighth position on the LDK's list in the 2001 Kosovan parliamentary election, which was held under closed list proportional representation, and was elected when the party won a plurality victory with forty-seven seats. The LDK formed a coalition government after the election; Jonuzi served as a supporter of the administration and was a member of the assembly's trade and industry committee.

He was promoted to the twenty-sixth position on the LDK's list in the 2004 parliamentary election and was re-elected when the list again won forty-seven mandates. The LDK formed a new coalition government after the election, and Jonuzi continued to serve as a government supporter. In his second term, he chaired the assembly committee on economy, trade, industry, energy, transport, and telecommunications.

All parliamentary elections in Kosovo since 2007 have been held under open list proportional representation. In the 2007 parliamentary election, Jonuzi finished in fifty-sixth place among the LDK's candidates. The list won twenty-five seats, and he was not re-elected.

Jonuzi ran for mayor of Vushtrri in the 2009 local elections and finished third. He has not returned to active political life since this time.

== Electoral record ==
=== Local ===
Mayoral results
Candidate	Party	First round		Second round	
Candidate	Party	Votes	%	Votes	%
Bajram Mulaku (incumbent)	Democratic Party of Kosovo	12,552	48.96	12,331	62.78
Muharrem Shabani	Alliance for the Future of Kosovo	6,777	26.43	7,312	37.22
Ibush Jonuzi	Democratic League of Kosovo	5,020	19.58		
Halil Kuqi	Democratic League of Dardania	1,141	4.45		
Emine Qerkezi	Social Democratic Party of Kosovo	147	0.57		
Total		25,637	100.00	19,643	100.00
