= Ferati =

Ferati is a surname. Notable people with the surname include:

- Arianit Ferati (born 1997) German footballer
- Beg Ferati (born 1986), Swiss footballer
- Besnik Ferati (born 2000), Macedonian footballer
- Fadil Ferati (1960–2010), Kosovar political leader
- Jasin Ferati (born 2003), Swiss racing driver
- Sadri Ferati (born 1957), Politician in Kosovo
