= Jonuzi =

Jonuzi is a surname of Albanian origin. Notable people with the surname include:

- Fjoart Jonuzi (born 1996), Albanian footballer
- Ibush Jonuzi (born 1950), Kosovar politician

== See also ==
- Ahmed Januzi (born 1988), Albanian footballer
