= Donika =

Donika is both a given name and a surname.

Notable people with the given name include:

- Donika Bashota (born 1995), Swedish–Kosovar tennis player
- Donika Kadaj Bujupi (born 1979), Kosovar politician
- Donika Emini, Kosovar dancer, model, and beauty pageant titleholder
- Donika Gërvalla-Schwarz (born 1971), Kosovan politician
- Donika Grajqevci (born 2002), Kosovar footballer
- Donika Kastrioti (1428–1506), Albanian noblewoman
- Donika Kelly (born early 1980s), American poet and academic

Notable people with the surname include:

- Anatoly Donika (born 1960), Russian ice hockey defenceman
- Mikhail Donika (born 1979), Russian ice hockey defenceman
- Vitali Donika (born 1982), Ukrainian ice hockey player
