= Ylber Hysa =

Kosovar politician and diplomat

Ambassador of Kosovo to Montenegro
- Incumbent
- Assumed office 2019

Ambassador of Kosovo to North Macedonia
- In office 2012–2018

Personal details
- Born: 1965
- Political party: Reformist Party ORA

Ylber Hysa was a member of the Assembly of Kosovo. He is a member of the Reformist Party ORA and a civil rights activist, and for many years was the director of Kosovo Action for Civic Initiatives (KACI), a Kosovo Albanian non-governmental organization.

In September 2007 he was ORA's nominee for the mayoralty of Pristina.

From 2012 to 2018, he served as the Ambassador of the Republic of Kosovo to North Macedonia. A year later, he became the Ambassador of Kosovo to Montenegro.
