= Fadil Ferati =

Political leader from Kosovo

1st Mayor of Istok
- In office June 1999 – 30 January 2010

Personal details
- Born: May 10, 1960 Istok, Yugoslavia
- Died: January 30, 2010 (aged 49) Istok, Kosovo
- Party: LDK (1989-2010)
- Spouse: Drita Ferati
- Children: Ilir Ferati; Besë Ferati; Triumf Ferati

Fadil Ferati (10 May 1960 – 30 January 2010) was a Kosovar political leader, he was the Mayor of Istok and vice-president of Democratic League of Kosovo and he was widely known as a politician who never lost any election.

== Biography ==
Born in Istok, Ferati finished primary school in Gurrakoc, municipality of Istok, middle School - Gymnasium in Istok and the Faculty of Economics at the University of Prishtine and graduated in 1985.

After graduation, he worked as an accountant in an undisclosed Istok private enterprise from 1988 to 1990. He was a major proponent the legalization of political pluralism in the former Yugoslavia and the establishment of the Kosovo Democratic League and the formation of its structures in the municipality. In early 1990 with the establishment of the Asset Gurrakoc LDK Presidency, he was elected member of the Active until 1992 . In the Second election, held in June 1992, he was elected Chairman of the Asset LDK Gurrakoc and member of the Presidency of the LDK branch in the municipality level . In the second regular Assembly was elected Chairman of the Presidency of the Council and the Municipal Finance function has practiced since 1995 until after the war, when it ceased functioning of the Council.

In the third Assembly LDK, held in September 1997, he was elected Chairman of the Presidency of the LDK in the municipality of Istok and now in the fourth Assembly LDK is again elected President of the Presidency of the LDK Istok municipality and a member of the General Council of the LDK.

After the intervention of troops by NATO, establishing the International Civil Administration, and the mediated agreement on the formation of the Kosovo Provisional Institutions managed by the International Administration, whether central or local, in December 1999, is set co Istok Municipal Council elections until 2000. After winning the LDK in this election, at its constitutive meeting, the Municipal Assembly delegates in Istok by a majority is elected President of the Assembly of the Municipality of Istok and also in the 2002 local elections, held on October 26 again was elected President of the Municipal Assembly of Istok municipality.

In 2005, he was re-elected as the President of the Presidency of the LDK branch in Istok and also became member of the National Presidency of LDK and member of the General Council of LDK.

In 2006 he was chosen as Deputy President of the LDK, which he held until he died on January 30, 2010. Also during the 2007 elections, in which he was elected by direct vote of the citizens as a Mayor of Istok, a function that he held until he died in January 2010.

Fadil Ferati was married to Drita and had three children named Ilir, Bese, Triumf. Ilir Ferati became the mayor of Istok in 2021.

== See also ==
- Ibrahim Rugova
- Democratic League of Kosovo
- History of Kosovo
- Istok
- Fatmir Sejdiu
