= Justice Party (Kosovo) =

Justice Party Partia e Drejtësisë
- Leader: Ferid Agani
- Founded: 2004
- Headquarters: Pristina
- Ideology: Islamism; Islamic democracy Religious conservatism Social conservatism Economic liberalism
- Political position: Centre-right to right-wing
- Colours: White, Red, Grey
- Assembly: 0 / 120

Website
- www.drejtesia.org

The Justice Party (Albanian: Partia e Drejtësisë) is a centre-right conservative political party in Kosovo.

In the 2004 parliamentary election, the party won 1.0% of the popular vote and 1 out of 120 seats.

The party participated in the 2010 parliamentary election in a coalition with the New Kosovo Alliance. After the resignation of Behgjet Pacolli, the party had 3 out of 120 seats.

In 2014 the party participated in a electoral alliance with the Democratic Party of Kosovo (PDK). The coaltion won 2 seats but both seats were assigned to the PDK

In the 2025 general elections, Partia e Drejtësisë formed a pre-election coalition called the family list. It consisted of two political parties. Partia e Drejtësisë and Aleanca Kosova e Re (AKR)

In the 2026 snap-parliamentary elections the party signed a pre-election agreement coalition with the Lidhja Demokratike e Kosovës. The coalition then went on to winning 16.69% of the votes which equals to 18 seats in the parliament.

The Justice Party, like all other Kosovo Albanian parties, supports Kosovo independence and does not participate in any election or referendum organised by the Serbian government.

== Ideology ==
The Justice Party follows a centre-right conservative platform as well as advocating a more liberal stance towards the economy. The party tends to attract religious conservatives in Kosovo (mainly Muslims) and has for example campaigned for a mosque to be built in Pristina to house the growing number of practising Muslims there. Although it is allied to the liberal New Kosovo Alliance it continues to follow a conservative platform and the religious-conservative faction in the party continues to grow.

The party has been noted for breaking away from Kosovo's traditionally secular society advocating for a ban on headscarves in schools in Kosovo to be overturned and for religion (on all major world beliefs) to be introduced and taught in schools.

The party has followed the Turkish moderate Islamist party Justice and Development Party (AKP), adopting several more liberal policies in economic terms and a more liberal interpretation of Islam citing to style it around AKP and the Turkish model of Democracy.
