= Reformist Party ORA =

Reformist Party ORA Partia Reformiste ORA
- Founded: 2004
- Dissolved: 2010
- Merged into: LDK
- Headquarters: Pristina, Kosovo
- Ideology: Social democracy Reformism
- Political position: Centre to centre-left
- Colours: Blue, Gold

Website
- www.ora-kosova.org

Reformist Party ORA (Albanian: Partia Reformiste ORA) was a social-democratic political party in Kosovo. The party supported Kosovo independence.

The party was normally referred to as ORA, which in Albanian means the Hour.

ORA was founded as Civil List ORA (Albanian: Lista Qytetare ORA) in the summer of 2004. During the legislative elections on 24 October 2004, the party won 6.2 per cent of the popular vote and 7 out of 120 seats in the Assembly of Kosovo and formed together with the Democratic Party of Kosovo, a strong opposition. However, in the election held in November 2007, it failed to pass the 5% threshold required to win seats in parliament, netting only about 4,2% of votes.

The following were members of Kosovo Albanian parliament from ORA: Nazim Jashari, Teuta Sahatqija, Gazmend Muhaxheri, Genc Gorani, Fatmire Mullhaxha Kollcaku, Ylber Hysa and Veton Surroi. Surroi was a member of the 'Kosovo Unity Team', a five-member team of the most senior negotiators that represents the people of Kosovo in the talks for the final status of Kosovo.

The last leader of the party, Teuta Sahatqija, took over the leadership on 2 March 2008.

In February 2010, ORA decided to dissolve as a political entity and join the Democratic League of Kosovo.

== See also ==
- Democratic League of Kosovo
- Democratic Party of Kosovo
- Alliance for the Future of Kosovo
- New Kosovo Alliance
