= Democratic League of Dardania =

Democratic League of Dardania Lidhja Demokratike e Dardanisë
- Leader: Nexhat Daci
- Founded: January 2007
- Dissolved: April 2015
- Split from: Democratic League of Kosovo
- Merged into: Democratic League of Kosovo
- Headquarters: Pristina
- Ideology: Conservatism; Social conservatism Economic liberalism
- Political position: Center-right
- Colours: Blue, White

Website
- www.ldd-kosova.org/

The Democratic League of Dardania (Albanian: Lidhja Demokratike e Dardanisë) was a political party in Kosovo. The Democratic League of Dardania was established in January 2007 by the former Speaker of the Assembly of Kosovo Nexhat Daci following his unsuccessful bid to become leader of the Democratic League of Kosovo. It was a conservative party and the second largest right-wing party in Kosovo in its time.

The leader of the Democratic League of Dardania was Nexhat Daci, the deputy leaders are Besa Gaxherri, Xhemajl Hyseni, Naser Rugova whereas the Secretary General is Lulëzim Zeneli. The party was initially named the Democratic League, but later Dardania, the ancient name for Kosovo, was added to avoid confusion with the Democratic League of Kosovo.

On April 30, 2015, its leader announced that his party would merge back into the Democratic League of Kosovo.

== See also ==
- Democratic League of Kosovo
- Democratic Party of Kosovo
- Alliance for the Future of Kosovo
- Reformist Party ORA
- New Kosovo Alliance
