= New Kosovo Alliance =

Kosovar political party

New Kosovo Alliance Aleanca Kosova e Re
- Leader: Vesel Makolli (acting)
- Founded: 3 May 2006; 19 years ago
- Headquarters: Pristina
- Ideology: Liberalism
- Political position: Centre to centre-left
- Regional affiliation: Liberal South East European Network
- European affiliation: Alliance of Liberals and Democrats for Europe Party
- Colours: Blue, Yellow
- Assembly: 0 / 120
- Municipalities: 0 / 38
- Councillors: 36 / 994

Website
- www.akr-ks.eu

New Kosovo Alliance (Albanian: Aleanca Kosova e Re, AKR) is a liberal political party in Kosovo. The party was founded on 3 May 2006, by Behgjet Pacolli .

== History ==
In April 2007, a BBSS Gallup International/Index survey suggested that the AKR was the fourth-largest political party in Kosovo with 8% support amongst those surveyed. The survey showed that the AKR was lagging behind the Democratic League of Kosovo (LDK) (26%), Democratic Party of Kosovo (PDK) (17%), and the Alliance for the Future of Kosovo (9%).

The AKR first ran candidates in the Kosovo elections which were held on 17 November 2007. The party won 12.3% of the vote and 13 seats in the assembly of Kosovo, making it the third-largest party in the nation. It was the largest official opposition party to the coalition government of the Democratic Party of Kosovo (PDK) and the Democratic League of Kosovo (LDK), led by Hashim Thaçi at the time.

On 22 February 2011, Behgjet Pacolli was elected as President of Kosovo by the members of Parliament. Immediately after becoming president, he resigned as the head of the AKR due to the Constitutional requirements that the head of the state cannot hold two different political functions simultaneously once in power.

On 4 April 2011, President Pacolli stepped down after his election as president was declared unconstitutional by the Constitutional Court of Kosovo. Most opposition members of parliament had boycotted the presidential vote due to their dissatisfaction with the candidates, and the court ruled this invalidated the election. President Pacolli earned respect for choosing to step down voluntarily and prevent the country from engaging in a political crisis. Many observers and foreign dignitaries, such as the United States ambassador to Kosovo, William Christopher Dell, commended the former president for his action.

The coalition government of the PDK and AKR continued, and the former president was appointed on 8 April 2011 as the first deputy prime minister of Kosovo. He was charged with leading a special task force to lobby for the recognition of the independence of Kosovo throughout the world.

Behgjet Pacolli was expected to return to leading the AKR by the end of July 2011. Rrahim Pacolli was to return to the post of general secretary of the party. Due to his efforts, in 2007 the party had gained its highest electoral success.

== Election results ==
Year	Votes	%Votes	Overall seats won	Albanian seats	Position	+/–	Government
2007	70,165	12.3%	13 / 120	13 / 100	▲3rd	13	Opposition
2010	50,951	7.29%	8 / 120	8 / 100	▼5th	▼5	Coalition
2014	34,170	4.67%	0 / 120	0 / 100	▼7th	▼8	Extra-parliamentary
2017	Part of the LAA Coalition		4 / 120	4 / 100	▲3rd	▲4	Coalition
2019	Part of the coalition with NISMA and PD		2 / 120	2 / 100	▼6th	▼2	Government support
2021	Part of the LDK list		1 / 120	1 / 100	▲3rd	▼1	Opposition
Feb 2025	Part of the coalition with PD and Lista për Familjen		0 / 120	0 / 100	▼6th	▼1	Extra-parliamentary

== See also ==
- Democratic League of Kosovo
- Democratic Party of Kosovo
- Alliance for the Future of Kosovo
- Reformist Party ORA
