= Alliance for the Future of Kosovo =

Kosovar political party

Alliance for the Future of Kosovo Aleanca për Ardhmërinë e Kosovës
- Chairman: Ardian Gjini
- Parliamentary leader: Besnik Tahiri
- Founded: 29 April 2001; 25 years ago
- Headquarters: Pristina
- Women's wing: Gruaja e Aleancës
- Ideology: National conservatism; Economic liberalism; Kosovo–Albania unionism
- Political position: Centre-right to right-wing
- National affiliation: AAK–NISMA (formerly)
- Assembly: 6 / 120
- Mayors: 5 / 38
- Municipal councils: 98 / 994

Website
- aak-ks.com

The Alliance for the Future of Kosovo (Albanian: Aleanca për Ardhmërinë e Kosovës, AAK) is a right-leaning political party in Kosovo.

== Leadership ==
The party was formed on 29 April 2001 after having previously operated as a coalition of five parties since 2 May 2000. The founder of the party is Ramush Haradinaj. Since 24 May 2026, the party has been led by Ardian Gjini. In December 2004 the parliament elected him as Prime Minister of Kosovo and he formed a coalition government with the largest party, the Democratic League of Kosovo (LDK). He resigned as Prime Minister in March 2005 after learning that he had been indicted by the International Criminal Tribunal for the former Yugoslavia, for 37 counts of war crimes. He received a full acquittal from the Tribunal on 3 April 2008. He returned to Kosovo and immediately resumed his duties as president of the party.

The AAK currently has three deputy presidents: Blerim Shala, Naim Maloku and Ahmet Isufi.

The current Secretary General is Burim Ramadani and the Secretary of Organisation is Ibrahim Selmanaj.

== Chairman of the AAK, 2001–present ==
#	President	Born–Died	Term start	Term end	Time in office
1	Ramush Haradinaj	1968–	29 April 2001	24 May 2026	25 years, 25 days
2	Ardian Gjini	1970–	24 May 2026	Incumbent	142 days

== In Parliament ==
At the last legislative elections held on 17 November 2007, the alliance won 9.6% of the popular vote and 10 out of 120 seats in the Assembly of Kosovo, which made it the fifth largest political force. This was a gain on the previous two legislative elections in 2001 and 2004 in which the AAK won 7.8% and 8.4% of the popular vote, respectively.

The AAK's eight current members of parliament are: Ramush Haradinaj, who is the leader of AAK, Shemsedin Dreshaj, Besnik Tahiri, Bekë Berisha, Pal Lekaj, Albena Reshitaj, Albana Bytyqi and Time Kadrijaj also serves as the AAK's member of the Assembly Presidency.

Currently they are part of the opposition team together with PDK, LDK and the Serb List

== Local elections ==
At the municipal elections held on 17 November 2007, the AAK gained control of 3 municipalities in western Kosovo: Peja, Gjakova and Deçan.

At the municipal elections held on 15 November 2007, the party gained 8 of 37 municipalities of Kosovo.

== Political position ==
AAK has been described as a pro-European and right-leaning party. Party leader Ramush Haradinaj announced his party's support for the passage of a Civil Code legalising same-sex civil unions, in spite of his personal support "for traditional families—father, mother, [and] child."

== Party name and symbols ==
The party flag is red, black and white. White represents peace; red and black are the national colours of the 96% Albanian majority of Kosovo.

The choice of the party's name, Alliance for the Future of Kosovo (AAK) is explained in Ramush Haradinaj's second book. Whereas previous Kosovo party acronyms began with consonants, a vowel was chosen for AAK because it seems less harsh and more open. The word "future" was chosen to mark a break with the old communist tendency to reflect backwards upon one's history. Finally, "alliance" was chosen because of its association with the NATO alliance which is much revered in Kosovo for its intervention in the Kosovo War of 1999, and also because it evokes the idea of working together to achieve one's aims. The alliance was originally formed by several smaller parties:

- People's Movement of Kosovo (Lëvizja Popullore e Kosovës - LPK)
- Parliamentary Party of Kosovo (Partia Parlamentare e Kosovës)
- Civic Alliance of Kosovo (Aleanca Qytetare e Kosovës)
- National Movement for the Liberation of Kosovo (Lëvizja Kombëtare për Çlirimin e Kosovës)
- Party of Albanian National Union (Partia e Unitetit Kombëtar Shqiptar)
- Albanian Union of Christian Democrats (Unioni Shqiptar Demokristian)

== Election results ==
Year	Votes	%Votes	Seats won	Position	+/–	Government
2001	61,688	7.83%	8 / 120	4th	Steady	Coalition
2004	57,931	8.39%	9 / 120	▲3rd	▲1	Coalition
2007	54,611	10.35%	10 / 120	▼4th	▲1	Opposition
2010	77,130	11.04%	12 / 120	4th	▲2	Opposition
2014	69,793	9.54%	11 / 120	4th	▼1	Opposition
2017	Part of the PAN Coalition		10 / 120	4th	▼1	Coalition
2019	96,872	11.51%	13 / 120	4th	▲3	Opposition
2021	62,111	7.08%	8 / 120	4th	▼5	Opposition
Feb 2025	66,226 (Note: AAK-NISMA total of votes)	7.07%	5 / 120	4th	▼3	Snap election
Dec 2025	52,423	5.50%	6 / 120	4th	▲1	Opposition
