= Democratic Party of Kosovo =

Kosovar political party

Democratic Party of Kosovo Partia Demokratike e Kosovës
- Abbreviation: PDK
- Chairman: Vlora Çitaku (Acting)
- Parliamentary leader: Arian Tahiri
- Founders: Hashim Thaçi
- Founded: 10 October 1999; 27 years ago
- Headquarters: Pristina
- Youth wing: Rinia Demokratike e Kosovës
- Women's wing: Gruaja Demokratike e Kosovës
- Ideology: National conservatism; Social conservatism; Economic liberalism; Kosovo–Albania unionism; 1999–2013: Social democracy; Social liberalism
- Political position: Centre-right to right-wing
- Regional affiliation: Liberal South East European Network
- European affiliation: ALDE Party (since 2022); ECR Party (until 2022)
- International affiliation: Liberal International
- Colours: Sky blue
- Assembly: 22 / 120 (18%)
- Mayors: 7 / 38 (18%)
- Municipal councils: 208 / 994 (21%)

Party flag

Website
- www.pdk.info

The Democratic Party of Kosovo (Albanian: Partia Demokratike e Kosovës; PDK) is one of the largest political parties in Kosovo. It was originally a social-democratic party coming out of the demilitarised Kosovo Liberation Army after the Kosovo War, with most of the leadership coming from Albanian nationalists and former members of the People's Movement of Kosovo. However, during its congress in January 2013, it positioned itself as a centre-right party and is considered to be a conservative party. The Democratic Party of Kosovo is headed by Bedri Hamza since 17 November 2025.

== History ==
The party was founded on 10 October 1999 from the political wing of the Kosovo Liberation Army as the Party for the Democratic Progress of Kosovo (Partia për Progres Demokratik e Kosovës), but was renamed on 21 May 2000. The party has increased in size and regional scope, initially winning the elections of 2007 and winning most of the regional elections in the municipal elections of 2009. PDK renewed its governing mandate after winning the elections of 2010.

1999 Logo of the Democratic Party of Kosovo

Members of the Party for the Democratic Progress of Kosovo (which was later called the Democratic Party of Kosovo) were blacklisted by the US under then-President George W. Bush in 2001.

In the 2004 election, the party won 28.9% of the popular vote and 30 out of 120 seats in the Assembly of Kosovo; in 2007 PDK won a plurality of seats for the first time with 35% of the vote. In 2010's disputed election, PDK came in first place again with 32% of the vote.

After 14 years of leadership of Hashim Thaçi who had to resign from party leadership to take the position of the President of the country, in May 2016, Parliament Speaker Kadri Veseli became party president by acclamation. He was elected with no votes against and no abstentions.

=== Elections in 2010 ===
Parliamentary elections were held on 12 December 2010, the first such elections organized in Kosovo since their declaration of independence. After early results, Hashim Thaçi, who was on course to gain 32 per cent of the vote, claimed victory for PDK, the Democratic Party of Kosovo. He said he intended to continue governing for another 4 years. After accusations of vote-rigging, voting was repeated in several municipalities. With more than 30 per cent of the vote, Thaçi formed a coalition with the New Kosovo Alliance, led by the ex-president, Behgjet Pacolli. It was in fourth place with 8 percent of the popular vote.

The turnout at the election was significantly higher than usual, augmented by Serbs who decided to vote in the disputed republic. Following the confirmation of the final election results, PDK and AKR formed a government with a program dedicated to EU integrations. The new government included many of the younger generation of PDK members, such as Bedri Hamza, Memli Krasniqi, Vlora Çitaku, Blerand Stavileci, Petrit Selimi, etc.

== Controversies ==
MPs Rrustem Mustafa and Latif Gashi resigned their offices in 2015 after receiving confirmed sentenced for war crimes. In April 2016, PDK MP Azem Syla was sought for arrest in connection to a large criminal group which appropriated socially owned property located in Prishtina’s suburbs amounting 30 million EUR.

Seven out of ten current mayors belonging to the PDK have been investigated, charged or convicted of abuse of office and other criminal activity. Sami Lushtaku of Skenderaj has been sentenced to 12 years for war crimes while he is being investigated for a corruption case. He ran for mayoral reelections and is serving in office both from prison. Nexhat Demaku of Drenas has been sentenced to one year and is being investigated in another case. Salim Jenuzi of Dragash was charged but found not guilty. Bajram Mulaku of Vushtrria and Begzad Sinani of Kamenica were investigated but not charged. Sinani is again under investigation for alleged illegal hunting. Former Lipjan mayor Shukri Buja was sentenced to four months suspended imprisonment for not declaring property to the Anti-Corruption agency, while Vitia Mayor Nexhmedin Arifi to 18 months suspended imprisonment for misuse of official position. Xhabir Zharku of Kaçanik was convicted to three years in prison for threats related to a privatisation case and illegal possession of a firearm forcing him to resign his position but was allowed to escape to Sweden where he now lives. Ramadan Muja of Prizren was convicted by a court of first instance. The case has been returned to retrial meanwhile Muja has run for and won a second term as mayor. Former Ferizaj Mayor Bajrush Xhemajli started serving a two-year sentence in 2014 after being convicted for killing a person in a traffic accident in 2009. The prosecution also investigated the former mayor of Gjilan Qemal Mustafa for road tenders but did not file charges. Sokol Bashota of Klina was being investigated for abuse of office in 2016.

In 2000 the brother of PDK leader Hashim Thaçi Gani Thaçi was found during a raid in Prishtina with a million German marks (500,000 euros) in cash. The origin of the money was uncertain.

Former Interior Minister Bajram Rexhepi was in office when about 1.5 million euros were embezzled is a case related to the production of passports by an Austrian company. Later about 200,000 of them were discovered in a chauffeur of Kadri Veseli. Adem Grabovci, leader of PDK parliamentary group, was involved in the "Pronto" scandal, a leak of audio recordings of an EULEX investigation, in which Adem Grabovci, Hashim Thaçi and Vlora Çitaku discuss employment of an uncle of Grabovci, Curr Gjoci. Shortly afterwards, Gjoci was appointed Director of the University Clinical Centre in Prishtina. In another scandal Grabovci's sons beat several police officers. They were sentenced to a prison sentence of six months which converted to 3,000 EUR fine each.

== Leader of PDK, 1999–present ==
#	President	Portrait	Born–Died	Term start	Term end	Time in office
1	Hashim Thaçi		1968–	27 October 1999	26 February 2016	16 years, 122 days
2	Kadri Veseli		1967–	9 March 2016	5 November 2020	4 years, 241 days
Act.	Enver Hoxhaj		1969–	5 November 2020	3 July 2021	240 days
3	Memli Krasniqi		1980–	3 July 2021	17 November 2025	4 years, 137 days
4	Bedri Hamza		1963–	17 November 2025	21 October 2026	338 days
Act.	Vlora Çitaku		1980–	21 October 2026	Incumbent	0 days

== Election results ==
Year	Votes	%	Seats won	Position	+/–	Coalition	Government	Leader
2001	202,622	25.7%	26 / 120	2nd	▲26	—	Coalition	Hashim Thaçi
2004	199,112	28.3%	30 / 120	2nd	▲4	—	Opposition	Hashim Thaçi
2007	196,207	34.3%	37 / 120	▲1st	▲7	—	Coalition	Hashim Thaçi
2010	224,339	32.1%	34 / 120	1st	▼3	—	Coalition	Hashim Thaçi
2014	222,181	30.4%	37 / 120	1st	▲3	—	Coalition	Hashim Thaçi
2017	245,646	33.74%	23 / 120	▼3rd	▼14	PANA	Coalition	Kadri Veseli
2019	178,637	21.2%	24 / 120	3rd	▲1	—	Opposition	Kadri Veseli
2021	148,285	17.0%	19 / 120	▲2nd	▼5	—	Opposition	Enver Hoxhaj
Feb 2025	196,353	20.96%	24 / 120	2nd	▲5	—	Snap election	Bedri Hamza
Dec 2025	192,434	20.19%	22 / 120	2nd	▼2	—	Opposition	Bedri Hamza
