= Radenko Nedeljković =

Kosovo Serb politician

Radenko Nedeljković (Serbian Cyrillic: Раденко Недељковић) is a Kosovo Serb politician. He was the Serbian government's municipal coordinator for Kosovska Mitrovica from 2007 to 2008 and leader of the Kosovska Mitrovica District from 2008 to 2013. In the latter role, he helped to oversee the Serb community's response to the 2011–13 North Kosovo Crisis. For most of his time in office, he was a member of the Democratic Party (DS).

== Early career ==
In the aftermath of the 1998–99 Kosovo War, Serbia lost effective control over most of Kosovo. It retained control over the municipalities of Leposavić, Zvečan, and Zubin Potok, as well as the northern part of the divided city of Kosovska Mitrovica.

In 2001, Nedeljković worked as an official of the Federal Republic of Yugoslavia (which comprised Serbia and Montenegro) in Kosovska Mitrovica, with responsibility of issuing Yugoslav passports. He incurred the wrath of some hardliners in the Serb community for issuing passports to Albanian as well as Serb applicants.

== Municipal coordinator ==
Nedeljković was appointed as municipal coordinator for Kosovska Mitrovica on 12 December 2007, replacing fellow Democratic Party member Srboljub Milenković. He served in this role during the buildup to the 2008 Serbian local elections in Kosovo; his term ended on 24 July 2008, after an elected administration came to power in the city.

Kosovo unilaterally declared independence from Serbia in February 2008. Like most Kosovo Serbs, Nedeljković strongly opposed this decision and continues to regard Kosovo as a province of Serbia.

== District leader ==
Nedeljković was appointed by the Serbian government as leader of the Kosovska Mitrovica district on 6 December 2008. His appointment was not, of course, recognized by authorities in the Republic of Kosovo, which considers the district to be its sovereign territory. In February 2009, he led a brief and largely symbolic road blockade protest directed at the newly established European Union Rule of Law Mission in Kosovo (EULEX). He called on international security forces in Kosovo "to refrain from promotion and propaganda with regard to the so-called Kosovo Security Forces but rather stick to their mandate."

In March 2009, Nedeljković said that the Priština authorities were "permanently pressuring the Serbs and other non-Albanians in order to make them move out," by withholding electricity, confiscating Serbian state documents, and other means. He argued that Priština was also attempting to portray northern Kosovo as an area of "organized crime, chaos and absence of authorities" in order to justify the entry of its security forces to the area. He made similar comments later in the year, saying, "Under Resolution 1244 Kosovo and Metohija is part of Serbia. It has long been clear that the so-called government of Kosovo, with the help of Pieter Feith, wants to show that crime is rampant in the north, so that under the pretext of stopping this it can use special forces to take control of northern Kosovo. [A recent statement] by KEK [Kosovo Energy Corporation] that it will cut power supplies to northern Kosovo is part of this. It is anticipated that this will cause the Serbs to revolt providing a pretext for intervention by a Kosovo intervention force and KFOR [Kosovo Force]. We will not yield in the fact of such pressure and provocations. Neither shall we relinquish our mother Serbia and its capital Belgrade."

He rejected Priština's proposed investment of five million Euros in northern Kosovo's Serb communities in August 2010, saying, "This is an investment with strings attached that is an attempt to integrate the Serb community in the phony state of Kosovo and I am convinced [...] that not a single municipal mayor in the north will take a single dinar offered by Priština."

=== North Kosovo crisis ===
In July 2011, Kosovo Police crossed into the predominantly Serb municipalities of northern Kosovo without consulting either Serbia or KFOR/EULEX in an attempt to assert control over several administrative border crossings. This action precipitated what became known as the North Kosovo crisis, in which members of northern Kosovo's Serb community restricted highway traffic with blockades.

Nedeljković represented local Serbs in early discussions with Serbian president Boris Tadić on resolving the situation. In these talks, he insisted on a strict fulfillment of the terms of United Nations Security Council Resolution 1244. He supported an August 2011 deal that would have seen the barricades dismantled in return for Kosovo Force continuing to guard the Jarinje and Brnjak crossings. Some local Serb leaders objected to a key aspect of the deal, however, and the barricades remained.

In September 2011, a Kosovo Albanian newspaper wrote of growing divisions within the Kosovo Serb leadership. Zubin Potok mayor Slaviša Ristić, Zvečan mayor Dragiša Milović, and northern Kosovska Mitrovica mayor Krstimir Pantić were described as having broken off communication with Serbian government officials Goran Bogdanović and Borko Stefanović. Nedeljković and Leposavić mayor Branko Ninić were by contrast described as maintaining good relations with the Belgrade officials.

Nedeljković said in November 2011 that Kosovo Serb leaders would give free passage to KFOR and EULEX officials "under the condition that they do not transport Kosovo Albanian customs and police officials to the border posts of Jarinje and Brnjak." In the same period, he joined with Oliver Ivanović to say that northern Kosovo could in theory declare independence if it was forced to integrate with Priština's governing structures; both Ivanović and Nedeljković clarified, however, that they intended to see the territory remain integrated with Serbia.

Nedeljković was highly critical of subsequent negotiations between Belgrade and Priština in Brussels. He supported the decision to hold a North Kosovo referendum in 2012, saying that the Kosovo Serb community could not achieve its goals solely by barricades. In August 2012, he accused EULEX and KFOR of "plotting to create violent incidents as pretexts to shut down the Serbian border and forcibly integrate Kosovo Serbs into [Priština's] institutions" and called on Serbian citizens not to fall for their "provocations."

He refused to support the 2013 Brussels Agreement on the grounds that it compromised Serbia's sovereignty in Kosovo. In April 2013, he resigned from the Democratic Party due to its support for the agreement. He later opposed the Serbian government's call for Kosovo Serbs to participate in the 2013 Kosovan local elections.

The Serbian government dismissed Nedeljković as coordinator for the Kosovska Mitrovica District on 21 October 2013. A 2014 court decision ruled that his dismissal was illegal, though it does not appear that he returned to office afterward.

== After 2013 ==
Nedeljković endorsed the Democratic Party of Serbia (DSS)–Dveri coalition in the 2016 Serbian parliamentary election. In the same period, he called for the Serbian government to once again organize its own local elections in Kosovo.
