= Milan Ivanović (politician) =

Kosovo Serb medical doctor, administrator and politician

Milan Ivanović (Serbian Cyrillic: Милан Ивановић; born 5 February 1955) is a Kosovo Serb medical doctor, administrator, and politician. He was a prominent figure in northern Kosovo politics for the first decade after the 1998–99 Kosovo War. Ivanović was for many years the leader of the Serbian National Council of Northern Kosovo and Metohija and has been a vocal opponent of engagement with the post-1999 governing authorities in Priština. He was not related to the late Oliver Ivanović.

== Private career ==
Ivanović is a specialist doctor living in Zvečan. He has served on different occasions as the director of North Mitrovica's hospital centre. In 2020, he was responsible for coordinating the community's initial response to the COVID-19 pandemic.

== Politician ==
=== Early years (1992–99) ===
Ivanović was a member of the Socialist Party of Serbia (SPS) in the 1990s. He received the ninth position on the party's electoral list for Leskovac in the December 1992 Yugoslavian parliamentary election and was not given a mandate when the list won seven seats. (During this period, one-third of parliamentary mandates in Serbian and Yugoslavian elections were assigned to candidates from successful lists in numerical order, while the remaining two-thirds were distributed amongst other candidates at the discretion of the sponsoring parties. Ivanović could have been awarded a seat despite his list position, but he was not.)

He appeared in the fifteenth position on the SPS list for Leskovac in the 1993 Serbian parliamentary election; the list won seventeen seats, and he was again not assigned a mandate. In the 1997 Serbian parliamentary election, he was given the third position on a SPS-led list in Kosovska Mitrovica and again did not receive a mandate even as the list won five of seven seats.

In January 1998, Ivanović spoke a rally in Zvečan to protest the killing of local assembly member Desimir Vasić, apparently by members of the Kosovo Liberation Army (KLA). He was quoted as saying, "May this rally be the beginning of a merciless struggle against terrorism and against the enemies of Serbia."

=== Community leader after the Kosovo War ===
==== From 1999 to 2003 ====
Kosovska Mitrovica became a divided community after the Kosovo War, with the northern half becoming predominantly Serb and the southern half predominantly Albanian. Ivanović became an executive member of the municipal Serbian National Council (SNV) in the northern half. In November 1999, the United Nations Interim Administration Mission in Kosovo (UNMIK) suspended him as deputy director of the hospital centre for thirty days after he refused to permit the reintegration of Albanian staff members who had walked off the job a month earlier. His suspension led to protests from the Serb community. Some doctors at a rally in support of Ivanović said that they opposed discrimination against Albanians but the proposed method of reintegration threatened the Serb community, while the hospital centre's management stressed that UNMIK should also ensure the safe return of Serbs expelled from other hospitals throughout Kosovo.

Ivanović was named to the executive committee of the Serbian National Council of Kosovo and Metohija on its founding in November 1999, with responsibility for health. In January of the following year, he articulated the council's policy of non-cooperation with UNMIK chief Bernard Kouchner and the mission's interim administrative council. He became known for making inflammatory speeches in this period; at a rally in February 2000, he called for the return to Yugoslavian troops to Kosovo, said that violence against Serbs from members of the Albanian community was increasing, and was quoted as saying, "Serbs feel the same as Jews in Auschwitz." On another occasion, he described French, German, and American soldiers in Kosovo as occupiers, saying, "They want to throw Serbs out of Serbian land." In August 2000, he said that the North Atlantic Treaty Organization (NATO)'s takeover of Trepča Mines, which was afterward shut down by UNMIK on environmental grounds, was part of a strategy to ethnically cleanse Kosovo of Serbs and establish a Greater Albania.

In February 2001, Ivanović spoke against the return of displaced Albanians to northern Mitrovica until displaced Serbs were permitted to return safely to other parts of Kosovo. "We have nothing against Kosovska Mitrovica being a multiethnic city again, but all other parts of Kosovo must be multiethnic, too," he said. In the same period, he called for Mitrovica to be formally divided into two separate municipalities. Some media reports from this period identified him, perhaps erroneously, as a local leader of the Democratic Party of Serbia (DSS).

Ivanović called for the Serb community to boycott the 2001 Kosovan parliamentary election, saying that participation "would legitimize the ethnic cleansing of Serbs from Kosovo." Unlike some other prominent Serb politicians in Kosovo, he considered the Serbian "Return" electoral coalition as an illegitimate project. Notwithstanding his opposition, the Serbian government supported participation and a large number of northern Kosovo Serbs took part in the vote. Ivanović's stand had political repercussions; in late 2001, the Serbian government removed him as director of the hospital centre. During this period, Ivanović was first identified as leader of the regional Serbian National Council of Northern Kosmet.

In April 2002, Ivanović welcomed Serbian deputy prime minister Nebojša Čović's proposal for separate entities in Kosovo (similar to those in Bosnia and Herzegovina) as "the essence of what Serbs need in order to survive in this area." The following January, he oversaw the creation of the Union of Municipalities of Northern Kosovo-Metohija and Serb Municipalities of Kosovo-Metohija, considered by some to have been the first iteration of the Community of Serb Municipalities.

===== 2002 charges =====
An arrest warrant was issued for Ivanović in August 2002 on charges of attempted murder. The charges related to events at a demonstration in Kosovska Mitrovica on 8 April 2002 when twenty-two members of a mainly Polish UNMIK contingency were injured after coming under fire from demonstrators armed with rifles and hand grenades. UNMIK officials believed that Ivanović had orchestrated the violence. The first attempt to arrest him was unsuccessful; he was not home when UNMIK authorities broke into his Zvečan flat to execute the warrant. Several leading SNV members charged that the arrest attempt was politically motivated, a position echoed by Yugoslavian president Vojislav Koštunica. Nebojša Čović said that video footage of the protest would prove Ivanović's innocence. Ivanović, for his part, was quoted as saying, "I never carried weapons and never breached the law. But I have no intention of surrender because I don't trust UNMIK's justice."

Notwithstanding this comment, Ivanović somewhat unexpectedly turned himself in to UNMIK authorities in October 2002. After initial questioning, his lawyer Toma Fila said that the charges against him had been reduced to inciting riots, and he was released on bail. He was again released from custody following a series of court hearings.

The case against Ivanović was restarted in April 2003 when an international prosecutor indicted him for "participating as a leader of a group that committed a crime" and for "attacking official persons performing duties of security." He issued a plea of not guilty before a three-member international council in September 2003, reiterating his contention that the charges were politically motivated. The following month, the court issued a guilty verdict and sentenced him to three months in prison. This decision would presumably have been appealed; online sources do not clarify if the conviction was upheld or if Ivanović actually served the sentence.

During this period, Ivanović and his leading political ally Marko Jakšić were also placed on an official blacklist by the United States of America.

===== Electoral politics =====
The Serb community of northern Kosovo generally participated in the 2002 Kosovan local elections, except in Kosovska Mitrovica. The SNV contested these elections as a political party, and Ivanović led its electoral list in Zvečan, where it won a narrow plurality victory with six out of seventeen mandates. Dragiša Milović of the second-place DSS was chosen by the assembly as the community's mayor, and Ivanović was chosen as deputy mayor.

The SNV did not participate as a party in the 2003 Serbian parliamentary election, and Ivanović said that it would not endorse any other party or coalition.

==== From 2004 to 2011 ====
Ivanović was once again the director of northern Kosovska Mitrovica's hospital centre by early 2004. He strongly condemned the 2004 unrest in Kosovo, which largely targeted the Serb community. At a rally to protest the murder of seventeen-year-old Dimitrije Popović, Ivanović was quoted as saying, "Kosovo is becoming a concentration camp for Serb children and at the same time the chief prosecutor of the Hague tribunal, Carla Del Ponte, has not indicted a single criminal responsible for the suffering of Serb children, thus opening the door wide for them to act with impunity." He later accused UNMIK of discriminating against the Romani people of Kosovo, on the grounds that "they share Serbs' fate and see Serbia as their homeland."

He was a leading proponent of the Serb community's boycott of the 2004 Kosovo assembly election. In February 2005, he was appointed as a member of the Serbian government's newly formed Council for Kosovo-Metohija. The following year, he welcomed the approval of Serbia's new constitution, which recognized Kosovo and Metohija as an integral part of the country with significant autonomy. In the 2007 Serbian parliamentary election, he urged voters to support the "national option" by choosing either the DSS, the SPS, or the Serbian Radical Party (SRS).

Like most Kosovo Serb politicians, Ivanović rejected the Ahtisaari Plan, saying that it would result in an independent Kosovo with Serbs as a threatened minority. He was a leading proponent of a Serb boycott of the 2007 Kosovo assembly election, which he (correctly) said would lead to the election of a parliament that would declare Kosovo's independence.

Ivanović urged Kosovo Serb voters to support SRS candidate Tomislav Nikolić in the run-off of the 2008 Serbian presidential election. Nikolić was narrowly defeated by incumbent candidate Boris Tadić of the Democratic Party (DS). Shortly after the election, Tadić signed a stabilization and association agreement with the European Union, which Ivanović described as a "classic betrayal of Kosovo and Metohija." Following Kosovo's unilateral declaration of independence in 2008, Ivanović said that members of a European Union delegation assisting in Kosovo's transition should be considered "an occupying mission that should be boycotted, including a refusal to sell them food and coffee in restaurants."

The 2008 Serbian parliamentary election did not produce a clear winner; after the vote, Ivanović said that a new government should be formed by the "national forces" of the DSS, SRS, SPS, and New Serbia (NS). Discussions for a government composed of these parties were ultimately unsuccessful, and the SPS instead formed a coalition with For a European Serbia alliance led by the DS. The SNV fielded candidates in two municipalities (Leposavić and Zvečan) in the concurrent 2008 local elections in Kosovo overseen by Serbia; the party won four seats in Zvečan, and Ivanović was chosen for another term as the municipality's deputy mayor. He also organized a largely ceremonial assembly of delegates from Kosovo's predominantly Serb municipalities in June 2008.

In June 2009, Kosovo Police initiated charges against Ivanović and Marko Jakšić for allegedly inciting a crowd of protesters to set fire to European Union Rule of Law Mission in Kosovo (EULEX) administrative crossings on Kosovo's northern border. Ivanović and Jakšić described the accusations as unfounded. EULEX announced a year later that various charges against Ivanović had been rejected, and Ivanović again said that he had been targeted for political reasons.

By July 2009, Serbia's DS-led government had removed both Ivanović and Jakšić from management positions at Kosovska Mitrovica's hospital centre.

==== Since 2011 ====
In 2011, Kosovo Police crossed into the predominantly Serb municipalities of northern Kosovo without consulting either Serbia or Kosovo Force (KFOR)/EULEX in an attempt to assert control over several administrative border crossings. This action precipitated what became known as the 2011–13 North Kosovo crisis, in which members of northern Kosovo's Serb community restricted highway traffic with blockades and roadblocks. Ivanović became a leader of the protests, saying in October 2011 that Serbs would continue to patrol the roadblocks despite the cold weather to prevent their removal by NATO forces. He later supported the 2012 North Kosovo referendum (which was not recognized by the Serbian government), in which 99.74% of voters rejected participation in the institutions of the Republic of Kosovo. Ivanović was an opponent of the 2013 Brussels Agreement, which normalized aspects of the relationship between Belgrade and Priština without addressing the status of Kosovo; he described the agreement as "unacceptable" and a threat to the vital interests of Serbs.

In 2012, the municipalities of Zubin Potok and Zvečan held local elections that were not sanctioned by either Belgrade or Priština. The SNV participated in the Zvečan vote and won three out of twenty-seven seats. Ivanović later served as a representative for Zvečan in the (again largely ceremonial) Provisional Assembly of the Autonomous Province of Kosovo and Metohija, which was established in July 2013.

Ivanović has continued to oppose engagement with the Priština authorities since the signing of the Brussels Agreement. He called for Serbs to boycott the 2013 Kosovo local elections, notwithstanding the Serbian government's support for participation.

He was once again reported as being the manager of North Mitrovica's hospital in 2014. In January 2018, he advised the media that doctors in the hospital had tried without success to save the life of Oliver Ivanović after the latter was shot by unknown assailants. Speaking at a protest rally later in the year, he said that no-one from northern Kosovo was responsible for Oliver Ivanović's death. In 2019, he took part in a protest against the proposed annexation of North Mitrovica into a united municipality. He appears to have retired from his position at the hospital centre in 2020.

Ivanović endorsed the Serbian Progressive Party (SNS) in the 2020 Serbian parliamentary election.

In January 2022, Ivanović's car was struck with several bullets. No one was injured in the attack. Authorities initially described this as an assassination attempt, although this statement was retracted when it was determined that no-one had been inside the car at the time of the shooting.

== Criticism ==
Over the course of his career, Ivanović was frequently accused of illegal activities in northern Kosovo. In 2008, Priština's Express newspaper alleged that Ivanović and Marko Jakšić were absolute rulers of the north prior to the 2008 Serbian parliamentary elections, supported by paramilitary groups and Serbian state authorities. The same source described their hold on power as having weakened when Vojislav Koštunica's second term as Serbian prime minister ended in 2008. Reports circulated in 2009 that EULEX was planning to indict Ivanović for a number of serious crimes, and in 2011 it was alleged that a confidential NATO bulletin described him as "a xenophobic person who controls all fuel routes in northern Kosovo, medicine and construction material smuggling." (EULEX did not issue the indictment, and the existence of the alleged NATO document was questioned.) Ivanović rejected these accusations as politically motivated. He said in a 2011 interview, "They say I am the leader of the mafia in northern Kosovo. They are trying to discredit us."
