= Branko Ninić =

Serbian politician

Branko Ninić (Serbian Cyrillic: Бранко Нинић; born 1974) is a Serbian politician. He is best known for serving as mayor of Leposavić, a Serb community in the disputed territory of Kosovo, from 2009 to 2012.

== Mayor of Leposavić ==
The Republic of Kosovo unilaterally declared independence from Serbia in February 2008. This decision was not recognized by Serbia and was opposed by most Serbs in the territory, particularly in the four Serb northern communities (including Leposavić) on the border with Central Serbia. Later in 2008, the Serbian government oversaw local elections in Kosovo in defiance of the declaration of independence.

On 9 July 2009, the Serbian government dissolved the municipal assembly of Leposavić and replaced it with a five-person provisional council with representation from different Serbian political parties. Ninić, a member of the Democratic Party (Demokratska stranka, DS) was appointed as mayor. This decision was met with some local opposition; a majority of members from the dissolved assembly held an unscheduled meeting to reject their dismissal as illegal. Nonetheless, Ninić was able to assume the mayoralty shortly thereafter.

As mayor, Ninić took part in negotiations on the status of the Kosovo Serb community and its municipal government authorities in the border areas. In December 2009, he rejected a suggestion from the Kosovo government that pro-independence candidates elected in the 2008 elections organized by Priština (with negligible popular support, against the Serb boycott) be allowed to take power. He argued that both the Serb and Bosniak committees in Leposavić had clearly opted for Serbia in a recent repeat of parliamentary elections and noted that more than seventy per cent of the electorate in the Serb border communities generally had participated in recent elections organized by Belgrade.

=== North Kosovo Crisis ===
In 2011, Kosovo Police crossed into the predominantly Serb municipalities of northern Kosovo, without consulting either Serbia or Kosovo Force (KFOR)/EULEX, in an attempt to assert control over several administrative border crossings. This action precipitated what became known as the North Kosovo crisis, in which members of northern Kosovo's Serb community restricted highway traffic with blockades and roadblocks. Ninić was a leader of the community's actions, along with fellow mayors Slaviša Ristić of Zubin Potok, Dragiša Milović of Zvečan, and Krstimir Pantić of northern Kosovska Mitrovica.

Early in the crisis, a border checkpoint staffed by the North Atlantic Treaty Organization (NATO) in the Leposavić village of Jarinje was burned by protestors. Ninić expressed his disappointment in this action and said that Leposavić citizens had not been involved.

Serb protestors established two new roadblocks in mid-September 2011, including one near the Jarinje crossing. Ninić defended this action, arguing that the Serbs had organized the blockade as a precaution and would not provoke any violence. When KFOR officials moved to dismantle the barricades later in the month, Ninić described their action as a provocation, taking place at a time when new international negotiations were set to begin. On 30 September, he accused NATO forces of "blatantly violat[ing] the mandate approved by the United Nations" by undertaking a hostile action against the protestors, adding that he had told a KFOR commander not to use force against civilians.

The leadership of the Serb border communities was divided on some points during the crisis. Some prominent figures, including Zubin Potok mayor Slaviša Ristić, accused the Belgrade government of betraying the interests of Kosovo Serbs and of colluding with the Kosovo government to integrate the Serb communities into the de facto independent territory. Ninić, who continued to support the administration in Belgrade, denied that this was the government's strategy. On 21 September 2011, the Serbian paper Danas reported that Ninić was the only mayor in the four border communities who was coordinating his actions with the Serbian government and the only one who had not called for the replacement of Borko Stefanović as Belgrade's chief negotiator with the Kosovo government.

In November 2011, Ninić said he believed that the status of the Serb communities in Kosovo would be solved in accordance with Serbia's laws and constitution. If this did not happen, he added, a unilateral declaration North Kosovo's independence would not be inconceivable.

An agreement for the re-opening of the roads was reached in early December 2011. Later in the month, the mayors of the other three Serb border communities called for a referendum on whether to recognize the authority of the government in Priština. Ninić argued that there was no need for a referendum, as Serbia's constitution already defined Kosovo as a part of Serbia. He was quoted as saying, "We will not make any unilateral moves without the state of Serbia. At a session of the Serbian Assembly's Kosovo Committee no one from the opposition parties publicly supported the referendum idea. If our country had said that we should accept the Kosovo institutions, then it would be logical to hold a referendum and say 'no.' This way it is totally unnecessary."

The North Kosovo crisis was ultimately ended by the 2013 Brussels Agreement, which normalized relations between Serbia and Kosovo without resolving the status of the latter.

== Departure as mayor and subsequent activities ==
Ninić stood down as mayor of Leposavić in 2012 when the Serbian Progressive Party formed a new governing alliance in the municipal assembly. He continued to lead the DS in opposition.

The Democratic Party experienced a serious split in early 2014, when former leader Boris Tadić set up a breakaway group initially called the New Democratic Party. Ninić sided with Tadić in the split. The new party contested the 2014 Serbian parliamentary election in a fusion with the Greens of Serbia and in alliance with other parties. Ninić received the ninety-fourth position on the alliance's electoral list; the list won only eighteen mandates, and he was not elected to the National Assembly of Serbia. The New Democratic Party was reconstituted as the Social Democratic Party (Socijaldemokratska stranka, SDS) later in the year.

The SDS contested the 2016 parliamentary election in alliance with the Liberal Democratic Party and the League of Social Democrats of Vojvodina. Ninić received the seventy-first position on their combined list; the list won thirteen mandates, and he was again not elected to the assembly.
