= 2008 Serbian local elections in Kosovo =

Local elections were held in Kosovo on 11 May 2008, together with Serbia's parliamentary elections and elections in Vojvodina. UNMIK authorities have criticized Serbia organizing elections saying only the UN can organize elections in Kosovo. Kosovo's President Fatmir Sejdiu accused Serbia of trying to challenge Kosovo's statehood.

There is a total of 115,712 registered voters and they were able to vote in 295 voting places. There are 157 voting places in Central Serbia and Vojvodina, and each of the seven major Montenegrin cities has one, for refugees from Kosovo.

== Background ==
Serbia's elections in Kosovo follow the unilateral declaration of independence by Albanian leadership in Kosovo, a declaration that Serbia considers illegal. This proposal for what many observers have called a de facto partition was said to be in response to unrest in Northern Kosovo and other Kosovo Serb areas. Establishment of Serb institutions in Kosovo is part of the "functional division" of Kosovo proposed by the Serbian government.

== Pre-election local authorities recognized by Serbia ==
On 12 January 2006, the Serbian government appointed new coordinators for twenty-four of Kosovo and Metohija's municipalities. The coordinators were:

- Kosovo District: Slaviša Nikolić (Priština), Živorad Stamenković (Glogovac), Živoja Balošević (Kačanik), Petar Savić (Kosovo Polje), Mirče Jakovljević (Obilić), Darko Jakovljević (Podujevo), Nikola Živković (Štimlje), Slavko Janićijević (Uroševac)
- Kosovo-Pomoravlje District: Mladen Jovanović (Gnjilane), Milan Ristić (Kosovska Kamenica), Petar Vasić (Novo Brdo), Nenad Kojić (Vitina)
- Kosovska Mitrovica District: Velimir Bojović (Leposavić), Dejan Tomašević (Srbica), Svetislav Aritonović (Vučitrn), Dragiša Milović (Zvečan), Slaviša Ristić (Zubin Potok)
- Peć District: Radojko Dunić (Peć), Zoran Barović (Dečani), Snežana Paunović (Đakovica), Stojan Dončić (Klina)
- Prizren District: Zećir Zurapi (Gora), Dejan Baljošević (Orahovac), Negovan Vitošević (Suva Reka)

Velimir Bojovic of Leposavić, Dragiša Milović of Zvećan, and Slaviša Ristić of Zubin Potok were already recognized as the mayors of their communities from the 2002 Kosovan local elections, which were organized by the Organization for Security and Co-operation in Europe (OSCE) and United Nations Interim Administration Mission in Kosovo (UNMIK). Northern Kosovo's Serb community generally participated in these elections.

Although not included in the main list of appointees from 12 January, Radoš Vulić was appointed as coordinator for Istok in the Peć District at around the same time. Miodrag Lazić served as the coordinator for Prizren. Stanko Jakovljević, mayor of the Serb enclave of Štrpce, was ultimately recognized as a coordinator as well. On 14 September 2006, Zećir Zurapi was replaced as coordinator for Dragaš by Alija Abdi.

In the predominantly Serb northern section of the divided city of Kosovska Mitrovica, UNMIK had dissolved the local administration in 2002 and appointed an advisory council. Srboljub Milenković became the leader of the council in 2006 and was recognized as a municipal coordinator by the Serbian government.

The Serbian government made the following changes on 12 December 2007:

- Dečani: Zoran Barović was replaced by Gojko Carević.
- Gnjilane: Mladen Jovanović was replaced by Predrag Stojković.
- Istok: Radoš Vulić was dismissed from office and, somewhat confusingly, was reappointed immediately afterward.
- Klina: Stojan Dončić was replaced by Milivoje Ribać.
- Kosovo Polje: Petar Savić was replaced by Dejan Nedeljković.
- Kosovska Kamenica: Milan Ristić was replaced by Srboljuc Đokić.
- Kosovska Mitrovica: Srboljub Milenković was replaced by Radenko Nedeljković. (Milenković continued to lead UNMIK's advisory council into 2008.)
- Kosovska Vitina: Nenad Kojić was replaced by Zoran Krčmarević.
- Obilić: Mirče Jakovljević was dismissed from office and, somewhat confusingly, was reappointed immediately afterward.
- Orahovac: Dejan Baljošević was replaced by Marjan Šarić.
- Štimlje: Nikola Živković was replaced by Dobrivoje Mladenović.
- Vučitrn: Svetislav Aritonović was replaced by Oliver Vojinović.

After being dismissed as coordinator for Štimlje, Nikola Živković served as coordinator for Lipljan. The main Serbian representative from this municipality had previously been Borivoje Vignjević, who was deputy mayor in a multi-ethnic government.

== Dispute over elections ==
UNMIK considers the holding of local elections in Serbia without its agreement as invalid and as a breach of UNSCR 1244. It has, however, proposed to hold local elections in the mostly Serb-populated municipalities of Leposavić, Zubin Potok, Štrpce, Zvečan and Novo Brdo, where the 2007 local elections were declared invalid due to the Serb voters' boycott; however, UNMIK insisted that it would have to organise the elections there, not Serbia, and that the date would likely not be 11 May 2008. UNMIK has no problem with the participation of Kosovo Serbs in the parliamentary election.

However, on 14 April 2008 the Election Commission announced it would hold local elections in Serb areas of Kosovo; internally displaced persons, whether living in Kosovo or not, will be able to vote as if they were living in the municipality from which they were displaced. Minister for Kosovo Slobodan Samardžić subsequently called on Joachim Rücker to sanction the elections. UNMIK spokesman Alexander Ivanko reiterated that UNMIK would view all elections held without its approval as illegal and in breach of UNSCR 1244.

On April 18, 2008 Joachim Ruecker, the Chief of UNMIK, said the elections would cross a "red line" if organized by Serbia.

The International Steering Group for Kosovo has expressed its support for the UNMIK position saying it opposes the "institutional separation by ethnic lines" in Kosovo.

Kosovo's Assembly adopted a statement condemning Serbia's plans to hold local elections in Kosovo and showing support for the position taken by UNMIK and President Fatmir Sejdiu. However, Kosovo police authorities have said they would not interrupt voting to prevent local elections. UNMIK declared the local Serb elections held in Kosovo in May 2008 null and void.

== Kosovo Serb Institutions ==
Marko Jakšić, a Kosovo Serb political leader and ally of then-Prime Minister Vojislav Koštunica, said Kosovo Serbs would form their own assembly following the elections. He argued that the Kosovo Assembly was dominated by "Albanian puppets" who would not work in the interest of the Serb minority.

Following the elections Samardžić outlined the makeup of the Kosovo Serb institutions consisting of municipal assemblies and executive councils. According to Samardžić municipal governments will act in keeping with the Serbian constitution and resolve all problems independently or in agreement with Belgrade.

UNMIK officials have said they will continue working with appointed Serb leaders declaring the local elections "illegal" and pledging not to negotiate with the elected officials. Yves de Kermabon, head of the EULEX mission to Kosovo, said he was "willing to talk to everybody" including officials elected on May 11, stressing that he would go to Northern Kosovo as soon as he found people there willing to talk. Kermabon said his reason was that he does not want the EU to be "forcibly deployed" there.

The mayor of Mitrovica condemned the formation of a parallel municipal assembly in North Mitrovica by Serbs following the election saying the institution was "illegal" as well as the elections. On June 13, 2008 a parallel assembly with 30 members, the majority from the Serbian Radical Party, was formed for Pristina with the first session being held in a warehouse due to a lack of space. Radovan Nicic was elected president of the municipality by the assembly. Another assembly was formed in Obilic north of Pristina the same morning.

Serbian parties (SRS, DSS, SPS, NS and DS) agreed to form a parliament for Kosovo Serbs including 45 delegates, 43 from the local assemblies and two seats reserved for Romani and Muslims. Slobodan Samardžić announced that the Kosovo Serb assembly would be formed on June 28. He said the body would be representative not executive. The parliament shall only be transitional before direct elections. The parliament was officially scheduled on 16 June 2008 to be held in Priština on 28 June 2008, symbolically on Saint Vitus' Day. Its official name shall be The Assembly of the Community of Municipalities of the Autonomous Province of Kosovo and Metohia. The parliamentary majority has been formed by the Democratic Party of Serbia, Serbian Radical Party, Socialist Party of Serbia and Civic Initiative of Gora. The opposition Democratic Party supports its constitution, but will for now boycott it. The cause of restoration of parliamentarism since 1999 was specifically stated as a reaction to the recently put in act Constitution of Kosovo and will only officialize the two separate systems which were already in act for years. It is pointed out that it is the representative body of Kosovar citizens loyal to the Republic of Serbia.

== Results ==
The turnout of registered voters was at 57%. Serbian Radical Party came first in 15 municipalities, the DSS has the most councilors in six, as well as various citizens' lists. The Radicals and DSS formed a coalition in the Assembly of the Community of Municipalities of the Autonomous Province of Kosovo and Metohija.

In the predominantly Serb communities of northern Kosovska Mitrovica, Leposavić, Zubin Potok, and Zvečan, the elected assemblies were able to form de facto municipal governments.

In several municipalities, the assemblies could not convene in their own communities and instead met in Central Serbia.

=== Kosovska Mitrovica District ===
==== Kosovska Mitrovica ====
Party	Seats
Serbian Radical Party–Tomislav Nikolić	11
Democratic Party of Serbia–New Serbia–Vojislav Koštunica	9
Democratic Party–Boris Tadić	6
Socialist Party of Serbia–Party of United Pensioners of Serbia–Strength of Serbia Movement–Ivica Dačić	2
Movement for Kosovska Mitrovica–Spasojević Dragan	2
G17 Plus–Zoran Katanić	–
Total	30

The Radical Party and the Democratic Party of Serbia–New Serbia alliance formed a governing coalition following the election. Nenad Topličević of the Radical Party was chosen as mayor. The Serbian government dissolved the local government on 24 December 2009, and Ivica Mirković of the Democratic Party was appointed as head of an interim leadership.

==== Leposavić ====
Party	Seats
Serbian Radical Party–Tomislav Nikolić	10
Democratic Party of Serbia–Vojislav Koštunica	8
Democratic Party–Boris Tadić	4
Socialist Party of Serbia–Party of United Pensioners of Serbia	3
Serbian National Council of Northern Kosmet for Leposavić–Dr. Milan Ivanović	2
New Serbia–Petar Biševac	2
Movement for Lešak and its Environs	2
G17 Plus–Nebojša Kostović	–
Serbian Renewal Movement–Miloš Petrović	–
Citizens' Group: Koreni–Ivan Vučković	–
Total	31

Vlastimir Ratković of the Radical Party was chosen as mayor after the election. All ten of the Radical Party's delegates joined the breakaway Serbian Progressive Party on its formation in October 2008. A subsequent ruling of the Kosovska Mitrovica district court invalidated the Progressive Party's mandates, thereby allowing other Radical Party delegates to be appointed in their place. A new administration was then formed with Jovan Miladinović of the Radicals serving as mayor.

The local administration remained unstable, and the Serbian government dissolved the municipal assembly in July 2009, after which time Branko Ninić of the Democratic Party became the leader of a provisional council.

==== Srbica ====
Party	Seats
Unanimously for Srbica	20
Total	20

Dejan Tomašević of the Movement for Srbica (one of the parties in the "Unanimously for Srbica" coalition) was chosen as mayor after the election. He continued as leader of the parallel government until 2013.

==== Vučitrn ====
Party	Seats
Serbian Radical Party–Tomislav Nikolić	16
Democratic Party of Serbia–Vojislav Koštunica	8
Democratic Party–G17 Plus–Boris Tadić	4
New Serbia–Velimir Ilić	4
Socialist Party of Serbia–Ivica Dačić	3
Total	35

Zoran Rakić of the Radical Party was chosen as mayor of the parallel government after the election.

==== Zubin Potok ====
Party	Seats
Democratic Party of Serbia–Vojislav Koštunica	19
Socialist Party of Serbia–Party of United Pensioners of Serbia, Ivica Dačić	9
Serbian Radical Party–Tomislav Nikolić	3
Democratic Party–Boris Tadić	–
Total	31

Incumbent mayor Slaviša Ristić of the Democratic Party of Serbia continued in office after the election.

==== Zvečan ====
Party	Seats
Serbian Radical Party–Tomislav Nikolić	9
Democratic Party of Serbia–Vojislav Koštunica	8
Serbian National Council of Northern Kosmet–Dr. Milan Ivanović	4
Socialist Party of Serbia–Party of United Pensioners of Serbia–Miodrag Acić	3
G17 Plus–Stojanka Petković	2
Democratic Party–Boris Tadić	1
Strength of Serbia Movement–Milentije Perović	–
Serbian Renewal Movement–Radomir Janićijević	–
New Serbia–Nebojša Gvozdić	–
Total	27

Incumbent mayor Dragiša Milović of the Democratic Party of Serbia continued in office after the election.

=== Peć District ===
==== Peć ====
Party	Seats
Democratic Party of Serbia–New Serbia–Vojislav Koštunica	22
Socialist Party of Serbia (SPS)–Strength of Serbia Movement (PSS)–Miloš Dimitrijević	15
Democratic Party–Boris Tadić	6
Total	43

Radojko Dunić of the Democratic Party of Serbia was chosen as mayor after the election, at a meeting that was boycotted by the Socialist Party of Serbia–Strength of Serbia Movement coalition and the Democratic Party. The opposition parties later claimed a majority in the local assembly, and in 2009 the assembly was dissolved for a new election.

Snežana Paunović was one of the Socialist Party delegates elected in 2008.

==== Dečani ====
Party	Seats
Democratic Party of Serbia–Zoran Barović	20
Total	20

Zoran Barović of the Democratic Party of Serbia was chosen as mayor after the election. The assembly was dissolved in June 2010.

==== Đakovica ====
Party	Seats
Citizens' Group: Đokica Stanojević	20
Socialist Party of Serbia–Ivica Dačić	13
Total	33

Đokica Stanojević was chosen as mayor after the election. The assembly was dissolved in June 2010.

==== Istok ====
Party	Seats
Serbian Radical Party–Tomislav Nikolić	17
Democratic Party–Boris Tadić	5
Democratic Party of Serbia–Gojko Đurić	5
Socialist Party of Serbia–Vukomir Đurić	3
Total	30

Dragoljub Repanović of the Serbian Radical Party was chosen as mayor after the election. The Serbian government extended his term in 2012, and he served until 2013.

==== Klina ====
Party	Seats
Democratic Party of Serbia–Sveto Dabižljević	9
Socialist Party of Serbia–Ivica Dačić	8
Metohija–Dragomir Pavlović	5
Democratic Party–Boris Tadić	3
Total	25

Sveto Dabižljević of the Democratic Party of Serbia was chosen as mayor after the election. The assembly was dissolved in June 2010.

== Subsequent developments ==
=== New elections in 2009 ===
The Serbian government oversaw new local elections in Peć and Priština on 16 August 2009 and in Leposavić on 29 November 2009.

==== Peć (16 August 2009) ====
Party	Votes	%	Seats
Socialist Party of Serbia–Party of United Pensioners of Serbia–United Serbia–Ivica Dačić	667	32.33	15
Serbian Progressive Party–Tomislav Nikolić	410	19.87	9
Democratic Party of Serbia–New Serbia–Dr. Vojislav Koštunica	378	18.32	8
Democratic Party–Boris Tadić	271	13.14	6
Social Democratic Party of Serbia–Dejan Jovanović	242	11.73	5
Serbian Radical Party–Dr. Vojislav Šešelj	95	4.60	–
Total	2,063	100.00	43

Miloš Dimitrijević of the Socialist Party of Serbia became mayor after the election.

==== Priština (16 August 2009) ====
Party	Votes	%	Seats
Serbian Progressive Party–Tomislav Nikolić	1,677	33.34	16
Socialist Party of Serbia–Party of United Pensioners of Serbia–United Serbia–Citizens' Group: Vidodvan–Ivica Dačić	1,016	20.20	10
Serbian Radical Party–Dr. Vojislav Šešelj	777	15.45	7
Democratic Party–Boris Tadić	756	15.03	7
Citizens' Group: Opstanak–Prof. Dr. Miroslav Popović	482	9.58	4
Democratic Party of Serbia–Dr. Vojislav Koštunica	322	6.40	3
Total	5,030	100.00	47

==== Leposavić (29 November 2009) ====
Party	Votes	%	Seats
Democratic Party–Boris Tadić	2,745	33.45	12
Serbian Progressive Party–Tomislav Nikolić	1,540	18.77	7
Democratic Party of Serbia–Dr. Vojislav Koštunica	1,038	12.65	4
Socialist Party of Serbia–Party of United Pensioners of Serbia–United Serbia–Ivica Dačić	916	11.16	4
New Serbia–Velimir Ilić	485	5.91	2
Serbian Radical Party–Dr. Vojislav Šešelj	448	5.46	2
G17 Plus–Mlađan Dinkić	394	4.80	–
Movement for Lešak and its Environs	258	3.14	–
Citizens' Group: Koreni	168	2.05	–
People's Party–Maja Gojković	166	2.02	–
Veterans' Party of Serbia–Raško Milenković	48	0.58	–
Total	8,206	100.00	31

Branko Ninić of the Democratic Party, who had previously served as the leader of a provisional council, was confirmed for a new term as mayor. He served until July 2012, when he was replaced by Dragiša Vasić of the Serbian Progressive Party.

=== New elections in 2010 ===
The Serbian government dissolved the local authorities of Kosovska Mitrovica and Novo Brdo on 24 December 2009 and held new elections on 30 May 2010.

==== Kosovska Mitrovica (30 May 2010) ====
Party	Votes	%	Seats
Serbian Progressive Party–Tomislav Nikolić	1,104		7
Democratic Party of Serbia–Dr. Vojislav Koštunica	1,085		7
Democratic Party–Boris Tadić	1,065		6
Socialist Party of Serbia–Party of United Pensioners of Serbia–United Serbia–Ivica Dačić	554		3
Citizens' Group: Serbia, Democracy, Justice–Oliver Ivanović	461		3
G17 Plus–Mlađan Dinkić	442		2
Social Democratic Party of Serbia–Rasim Ljajić	319		2
Movement for Kosovska Mitrovica–Dragan Spasojević			–
Citizens' Group: For a Better Future of Mitrovica			–
New Serbia–Velimir Ilić			–
Serbian Radical Party–Dr. Vojislav Šešelj			–
Citizens' Group: Serbian National Council of Northern Kosovo and Metohija–Dr. Milan Ivanović			–
Citizens' Group: New Hope for Kosovska Mitrovica			–
Total			30

Ivica Mirković of the Democratic Party was chosen as mayor in July 2010. He was replaced by Krstimir Pantić of the Progressives in October of the same year, after Pantić's party formed an alliance with the Democratic Party of Serbia. Pantić resigned in March 2013 and was replaced by Dragiša Vlašković, also of the Progressives.

==== Novo Brdo (30 May 2010) ====
Party	Votes	%	Seats
Socialist Party of Serbia–Party of United Pensioners of Serbia–United Serbia–Ivica Dačić	479	45.75	14
Democratic Party–Boris Tadić	275	26.27	8
Serbian Progressive Party–Tomislav Nikolić	235	22.45	6
Democratic Party of Serbia–Dr. Vojislav Koštunica	58	5.54	1
Total	1,047	100.00	29

=== Dissolution of seven local authorities in June 2010 ===
The Serbian government dissolved the authorities of Dečani, Đakovica, Klina, Podujevo, Prizren, Suva Reka, and Uroševac on 17 June 2010, charging that they had become dysfunctional and inefficient. On 28 June 2010, the government appointed new coordinators for these municipalities:

- Dečani: Snežana Paunović
- Đakovica: Đokica Stanojević
- Klina: Milivoje Ribać
- Podujevo: Darko Radovanović
- Prizren: Zoran Poskočević
- Suva Reka: Milan Mihajlović
- Uroševac: Milan Janjić

All of the coordinators served until May 2013.

=== Unauthorized elections in 2012 ===
The predominantly Serb municipalities of Zubin Potok and Zvečan organized local elections on 6 May 2012, on the grounds that the terms of assemblies elected in 2008 were set to expire. The broader diplomatic situation had changed by this time, and the elections were not recognized as legitimate by the Government of Serbia, the Government of Kosovo, or the international community.

Following the elections, Oliver Ivanović (at the time a secretary of state in Serbia's ministry for Kosovo and Metohija) indicated that provisional governing councils would be established in both municipalities. Despite the objections from Belgrade, however, new municipal assemblies were constituted in both communities on 30 May 2012. While the Serbian government never formally recognized the legitimacy of the 2012 elections in these municipalities, they did not overturn the local governing authorities until the more general restructuring of state institutions that followed the 2013 Brussels Agreement.

==== Zubin Potok ====
Party	Votes	%	Seats
Democratic Party of Serbia	2,893	63.5	21
Serbian Radical Party	822	27.6	9
United Regions of Serbia		5.7	1
Total			31

Incumbent mayor Slaviša Ristić of the Democratic Party of Serbia continued in office after the election.

==== Zvečan ====
Party	Votes	%	Seats
Democratic Party of Serbia–Vojislav Koštunica	1,367	35.45	10
Stojanka Petković–For Zvečan in Serbia–United Regions of Serbia	1,023	26.53	7
Socialist Party of Serbia–Party of United Pensioners of Serbia–Miodrag Acić	556	14.42	4
Serbian National Council of Northern Kosovo and Metohija–Dr. Milan Ivanović for Zvečan	516	13.38	3
Serbian Radical Party–Dr. Aleksandar Martinović	394	10.22	3
Total	3,856	100.00	27

Incumbent mayor Dragiša Milović of the Democratic Party of Serbia was confirmed for another term in office after the election. All lists except the United Regions of Serbia participated in the local government.

=== 2013 Brussels Deal and after ===
As part of the 2013 Brussels deal all aspects of this election were repudiated and invalidated by Serbia.

==== Serbian provisional authorities ====
===== Kosovska Mitrovica, Leposavić, Zvečan, and Zubin Potok =====
The Serbian government formally dissolved the parallel local assemblies of Kosovska Mitrovica, Leposavić, Zubin Potok, and Zvečan in September 2013. The following individuals were appointed to lead provisional authorities in these municipalities:

- Dragan Jablanović (Movement of Socialists, Leposavić)
- Krstimir Pantić (Serbian Progressive Party, Kosovska Mitrovica)
- Dragan Nedeljković (Zvečan)
- Stevan Vulović (Socialist Party of Serbia, Zubin Potok)

The Serbian government has continued to recognize these provisional authorities since 2013, and their authority has existed in parallel to the authority of mayors and councillors recognized by Priština. (The Serbian government began encouraging Kosovo Serbs to participate in the political structures overseen by Priština in 2013 while also maintaining the provisional authorities. In late 2022, the Serbian government and the Serb List began boycotting the Priština institutions against the backdrop of an ongoing crisis in North Kosovo.)

The Serbian provisional authority in Mitrovica holds de facto authority only in the northern part of the city, which is recognized by the Priština authorities as North Mitrovica.

Personnel changes since 2013:

- On 25 January 2014, Krstimir Pantić was succeeded as leader of the provisional authority in Kosovska Mitrovica by Aleksandar Spirić.
- On 30 September 2015, Dragan Nedeljković was succeeded as leader of the provisional authority in Zvečan by Ivan Todosijević.
- On 6 October 2015, Dragan Jablanović was succeeded as leader of the provisional authority in Leposavić by Zoran Todić.
- In late 2018, Steven Vulović resigned as leader of the provisional authority in Zubin Potok and was replaced by Srđan Vulović.
- On 20 October 2023, Aleksandar Spirić was succeeded as leader of the provisional authority in Kosovska Mitrovica by Ivan Zaporožac.

===== Other municipalities =====
The Serbian government has also appointed provisional authorities in other municipalities, although these do not have the same de facto governing powers as in the four predominantly Serb municipalities in the north. Other leaders of provisional governing bodies since 2013 include:

- Dečani: Vuko Vuković (2013?–2021); Darko Kolašinac (2021–2023); Zoran Maksimović (2023–present)
- Đakovica: Kosta Belošević (2013–2020); Milenko Jovanović (2020–present)
- Istok: Mališa Đurić (2013–2021); Kosta Belošević (2021–present)
- Klina: Stojan Dončić (2013–2015); Božidar Šarković (2015–2020); Vlado Šmigić (2020); Božidar Šarković (2020); Vesna Pešić (acting 2020–2021; 2021–present)
- Peć: Miloš Dimitrijević (2013–2023); Darko Kolašinac (2023–present)
- Srbica: Milomir Jokić (2013–2017?); Rajko Tomašević (2021); Vasilije Tomašević (2021–present)
- Vučitrn: Desimir Miljković (2013–2016), Aleksandar Mišić Aca (2016–2021), Milan Kostić (2021–present)
