= Dragiša Milović =

Kosovo Serb politician (born 1957)

Dragiša Milović (Serbian Cyrillic: Драгиша Миловић; born 1957) is a Kosovo Serb politician. He was the mayor of Zvečan, a predominantly Serb community in the disputed territory of Kosovo, from 2002 to 2013, serving as a member of the Democratic Party of Serbia (DSS). In 2021, he was re-elected to the same position as a candidate of the Serb List (SL).

The Serb List began a boycott of the Republic of Kosovo's political institutions in November 2022, and Milović submitted his resignation in Zvečan's assembly at that time.

== Private career ==
Milović is a medical doctor and orthopedic specialist. He is deputy director of Clinical Hospital Center Kosovska Mitrovica. In August 2023, he said that new supplies of vital medicines had not been received in months due to the Priština government's ban on importing the goods.

== Politician ==
=== Serbian National Council and early UNMIK administration (1999–2001) ===
Milović was a founding member of the Serbian National Council of Kosovo and Metohija in January 1999 and was the first chair of its initiative committee. He said that the council had been formed from the dissatisfaction of Kosovo Serbs with the Serbian government's policies in the province. He was quoted as saying, "We Serbs from Kosovo-Metohija cannot be represented by the so-called Provisional Executive Council [set up by the Belgrade authorities] at the forthcoming [...] negotiations with the Albanians. It seems that the reason for setting it up was to once again surrender Serb land [...] without too much commotion. We do not accept any proposals which restrict the sovereignty and violate the territorial integrity of Serbia."

Serbia lost effective control over most of Kosovo following the 1998–99 Kosovo War, and the United Nations Interim Administration Mission in Kosovo (UNMIK) was set up as a temporary authority in the province. In 2000, the Organisation for Economic Co-operation and Development (OECD) organized local elections under the auspices of UNMIK; these were largely boycotted by the Serb community, whose leaders argued that the security situation would not allow Serbs to return to their homes. Acting as a spokesperson for Oliver Ivanović, Milović said that Serbs in northern Kosovo would "[would] not register or take part in the vote until Serbs start returning to Kosovo in bigger numbers."

Milović was vice-president of the Zvečan municipal assembly at this time; the position was equivalent to deputy mayor. In June 2000, both he and Zvečan mayor Desimir Petković were removed from office due to their willingness to negotiate with UNMIK. By 2002, however, Milović had returned to office as deputy mayor. As an ally of Oliver Ivanović, he resigned from the Serbian National Council executive in June 2001 after Ivanović's removal.

=== Mayor of Zvečan (2002–13) ===
The Kosovo Serb community generally participated in the 2002 local elections in northern Kosovo, except in Kosovska Mitrovica. Milović appeared in the lead position on the DSS's electoral list for Zvečan and was elected to the local assembly when the list won five out of seventeen seats. No party won a clear victory, and the DSS was able to form a coalition government with Milović as mayor. In a meeting with UNMIK leader Michael Steiner shortly after his election, Milović said that the United Nations mission had failed in its goals. "Even after three and a half years there has been no mass return of Serbs," he said, "while there is no safety and freedom of movement for the remaining Serb population in the province."

In 2004, Milović said that his administration would not accommodate "destabilizing" actions, citing UNMIK's recent decision to turn over municipal police responsibilities to the Kosovo Police without local consultation or approval. In August 2005, he said that parts of Zvečan were experiencing serious water shortages due to the decision of the Priština authorities to withhold necessary water supplies from Serb communities in the north.

At a protest in early 2006, Milović said that "a settlement to the status of Kosovo must be arrived at through compromise, international law and the borders must be respected, there must be no winners and losers." Later in the year, he welcomed the approval of a new Serbian constitution that recognized Kosovo and Metohija as an integral part of the country with significant autonomy.

The Serb community in northern Kosovo generally boycotted the 2007 Kosovan local elections, which took place against the backdrop of the province's drive for independence. Milović did not accept the elections as legitimate and was not a candidate. Like most Kosovo Serb politicians, he opposed Kosovo's unilateral declaration of independence in 2008 and still considers Kosovo to be a province of Serbia.

The Serbian government organized its own local elections in Kosovo in 2008. Although not recognized internationally, the vote provided de facto legitimacy to the governing authorities in Zvečan and in the neighbouring municipalities of Leposavić, Zubin Potok, and northern Kosovska Mitrovica. The DSS actually finished second against the far-right Serbian Radical Party (SRS) in Zvečan, but Milović was able to form a new coalition government with smaller parties and continue in office as mayor. The authorities in Priština later organized new local elections in 2009; as in 2007, these were generally boycotted by the Serb community and had no practical effect on the local government of Zvečan.

In June 2009, Milović took part in a protest against the introduction of new customs measures on Kosovo's northern border. He said that Serbs did not oppose paying taxes to Serbia's government but did not want their money to support the Priština authorities. He was quoted as saying, "We want to confirm that the blockade is not aimed at the police or KFOR, only against the customs and that should be clear to everyone."

Milović condemned an attack on an Albanian-owned bakery in Zvečan in 2010, saying, "the Albanians, citizens of our municipality, ten years since the arrival of the UN mission, have had no problems. We insist and urge the police to find those perpetrators."

==== 2011 North Kosovo Crisis ====
In July 2011, Kosovo Police crossed into the predominantly Serb municipalities of northern Kosovo, without consulting either Serbia or KFOR/EULEX, in an attempt to assert control over several administrative border crossings. This action precipitated what became known as the North Kosovo crisis, in which members of northern Kosovo's Serb community restricted highway traffic with blockades. Milović was a leader of the community's actions, working alongside fellow mayors Slaviša Ristić of Zubin Potok, Branko Ninić of Leposavić, and Krstimir Pantić of northern Kosovska Mitrovica.

The Belgrade and Priština governments announced a deal in August 2011 that would have seen Kosovo Force continue to guard the Jarinje and Brnjak crossings. Local Serbs objected to a key aspect of the deal, however, and the blockades continued. Addressing a crowd of protesters, Milović said, "We will stay at the barricades because as mayors of northern Kosovo we are obliged to respect the opinion of the local people. We don't want to oppose the Serbian state but we want to respect your decisions." He subsequently joined with Ristić and Pantić to request the removal of Borko Stefanović from the Belgrade–Pristina negotiations in Brussels, arguing that Stefanović did not enjoy the support of the Kosovo Serb community. A December 2011 report in the Serbian paper Blic described Milović as the second-most important figure, after Slaviša Ristić, in coordinating the Serb community's actions; both mayors were described as enjoying support from their electorate that transcended normal party divisions.

The municipalities of Zubin Potok and Zvečan organized new municipal elections in 2012 as the four-year mandates from 2008 were due to expire. The broader diplomatic situation had changed by this time, and the elections were not officially recognized by either Belgrade or Priština. The DSS won in both municipalities, and Ristić and Milović continued as to serve as mayors of their communities. Ultimately, the Serbian government did not overturn the results.

==== 2013 Brussels Agreement ====
Milović called for the views of Kosovo Serbs to be taken into account during negotiations for the 2013 Brussels Agreement, saying that the local community could establish an assembly of northern Kosovo if this did not happen. The agreement normalized some aspects of the relationship between Belgrade and Priština without addressing the status of Kosovo; the Serbian government attempted to win local support for the deal, though ultimately both Ristić and Milović opposed it.

The Serbian government dissolved the assemblies of Zvečan and other the three Serb municipalities in northern Kosovo in September 2013, thereby ending Milović's tenure as mayor. Milović did not participate in the 2013 local elections (which were supported by both Belgrade and Priština) due to calls from some members of the community for a boycott. He was quoted as saying, "We cannot participate in elections that were called by the provisional government in Priština which is recognized by neither Kosovo Serbs nor Serbia."

=== 2017 candidacy and return to the mayor's office in 2021 ===
Notwithstanding Milović's opposition, Kosovo Serbs generally participated in the 2013 local elections. Milović ultimately ended his boycott and was a mayoral candidate in the 2017 local elections, running for his own "For Our Zvečan" party in an alliance with Oliver Ivanović. Milović's car was torched during the campaign. On election day, he lost to incumbent Vučina Janković of the Serb List. He also led the "For Our Zvečan" list for the municipal assembly and was elected when it won five mandates. Following Ivanović's assassination by unknown parties in early 2018, Milović gave an interview in which he lamented the power of organized crime in northern Kosovo.

Milović subsequently joined the Serb List and was re-elected as mayor of Zvečan under its banner in the 2021 local elections. His decision to join the governing party was a notable development in the internal politics of the Kosovo Serb community, and it has been suggested that the party effectively co-opted him as a member. In 2021–22, Milović's leadership in Zvečan overlapped with that of Ivan Todosijević, whom the Serbian government recognizes as leader of a provisional authority.

The Serb List began boycotting Priština's institutions in November 2022, against the backdrop of the ongoing North Kosovo crisis. Milović resigned as mayor on 6 November 2022. The Priština government subsequently oversaw new local elections in North Kosovo that were boycotted by the Serb community; members of the local Kosovo Albanian community were formally elected as mayors with very low turnout. In Zvečan, less than three per cent of the eligible population cast a ballot.

In May 2023, Milović acted as a negotiator between Kosovo Force (KFOR) units and Serb residents of Zvečan who were protesting the installation of the new mayor. Violence broke out when KFOR broke up the demonstration; it was reported in Danas that Milović was beaten by KFOR and narrowly escaped arrest. He has continued to play a leading role in the Serb community's protests, calling for a negotiated resolution to the crisis.

=== Politics at the republic level in Serbia ===
Milović appeared in the 107th position on the Democratic Party of Serbia's electoral list in the 2003 Serbian parliamentary election. The list won fifty-three seats, and he was not given a mandate. (From 2000 to 2011, Serbian parliamentary mandates were awarded to sponsoring parties or coalitions rather than to individual candidates, and it was common practice for the mandates to be assigned out of numerical order. Milović could have been awarded a seat in the assembly notwithstanding his position on the list, although in fact he was not.) He later appeared in the 201st position on a combined DSS–New Serbia (NS) list in the 2008 parliamentary election and did not receive a seat when the list won thirty mandates.

Serbia's electoral system was reformed in 2011, such that mandates were awarded to candidates on successful lists in numerical order. Milović appeared in the sixty-second position on the DSS list in the 2012 Serbian parliamentary election and was not elected when the list won twenty-one seats. He left the DSS after Vojislav Koštunica retired as leader.

== Electoral record ==
=== Local ===
2021 Kosovan local elections: Mayor of Zvečan
Candidate	Party	Votes	%
Dragiša Milović	Serb List	5,394	98.43
Slađana Pantović	independent candidate	86	1.57
Total		5,480	100.00

2017 Kosovan local elections: Mayor of Zvečan
Candidate	Party	Votes	%
Vučina Janković (incumbent)	Serb List	2,863	70.59
Dragiša Milović	Civic Initiative "For Our Zvečan"	1,193	29.41
Total		4,056	100.00
