= Stojanka Petković =

Serbian politician

Stojanka Petković (Serbian Cyrillic: Стојанка Петковић; born 22 August 1959) is a Kosovo Serb former politician. She served in the Assembly of Kosovo from 2001 to 2004 as part of the Serbian "Return" coalition and in the National Assembly of Serbia from 2007 to 2012 as a member of G17 Plus.

== Early life and career ==
Petković was born in Leposavić, in the same year that the municipality was transferred from "Serbia proper" to the Autonomous Region of Kosovo and Metohija in the People's Republic of Serbia, Federal People's Republic of Yugoslavia. She graduated in economics at Kosovska Mitrovica and worked as an import and export consultant at RMHK Trepča from 1982 to 2004. She later became head of finance for the kindergarten in Zvečan. Petković earned a master's degree in 2010.

== Politician ==
=== Kosovo parliamentarian (2001–04) ===
An opponent of Slobodan Milošević's government in the 1990s, Petković entered political life as a member of the Social Democracy (SD) party. She appeared in the tenth position on the electoral list of the Serb community's "Return" coalition in the 2001 Kosovan parliamentary election, which was held via closed list proportional representation under the auspices of the United Nations Interim Administration Mission in Kosovo (UNMIK), and was elected when the list won twenty-two seats. The coalition received twenty-two mandates in the 120-member chamber, which was dominated by parties from the province's majority Albanian community. Relations between the Albanian and Serb communities were generally poor in the aftermath of the Kosovo War (1998–99), and Petković later recounted that there was little interaction between the communities in the assembly. On one occasion, she said that an Albanian colleague who joined her for coffee was afterward criticized by other Albanian delegates for fraternizing with a Serb.

During her time in the assembly, Petković was the chair of the labour and social policy committee as well as a member of the budget committee and the Organization for Security and Co-operation in Europe (OSCE) working group on the law on elections in Kosovo. She did not seek re-election in the 2004 Kosovan parliamentary election, which was largely boycotted by the Serb community.

=== Serbian government positions in Kosovo (2002–06) ===
Petković was appointed as the Serbian government's commissioner for labour, employment, and social policy for Kosovo and Metohija in 2002 and held the position until 2006. In February 2005, she became a member of the Serbian government's newly formed Council for Kosovo-Metohija.

=== Politics at the republic level in Serbia ===
==== 2003 candidacy ====
Social Democracy contested the 2003 Serbian parliamentary election as part of the four-party "Defense and Justice" coalition, and Petković appeared in the 174th position on the coalition's electoral list. The list did not cross the electoral threshold to win representation in the assembly.

==== Parliamentarian (2007–12) ====
Petković later left Social Democracy and joined G17 Plus, appearing in the 162nd position on the party's list in the 2007 Serbian parliamentary election. The list won nineteen seats, and she chosen afterward for its assembly delegation. (From 2000 to 2011, Serbian parliamentary mandates were awarded to sponsoring parties or coalitions rather than to individual candidates, and it was common practice for the mandates to be awarded out of numerical order. Petković's position on the list – which was in any event mostly alphabetical – had no specific bearing on her chances of election.) G17 Plus participated in Serbia's coalition government after the election, and Petković served in parliament as a supporter of the administration. She was a member of the assembly committee for Kosovo and Metohija.

In October 2007, Petković said that the Albanian National Army paramilitary group posed a serious threat to the province's Serb minority. "Serbs in northern Kosovo are well organized and ready to defend themselves," she said. "We hope they will continue to be prepared to defend themselves and their property."

G17 Plus initially intended to participate in the 2007 Kosovan local elections despite calls from within the Serb community for a boycott, and Petković was registered in the lead position on the party's list for Zvečan. The party withdrew from the elections after the Serbian government endorsed the boycott, although by this time it was too late for the ballot papers to be changed. A Molotov cocktail was thrown at Petković's home shortly before the vote, and she said it was extremely fortunate that no-one was hurt in the attack. She blamed organized criminal groups in the Serb community and speculated that she might be the first Serb to leave Kosovo due to threatened violence from other Serbs.

Like most Kosovo Serbs, Petković strongly opposed Kosovo's unilateral declaration of independence in 2008.

For the 2008 Serbian parliamentary election, G17 Plus became a part of the For a European Serbia (ZES) coalition led by the Democratic Party (DS). Petković appeared in the 165th position on the coalition's list and was chosen for a second term in the assembly when the list won 102 out of 250 mandates. The overall results of the election were inconclusive, but ZES eventually formed a coalition government with the Socialist Party of Serbia (SPS), and Petković again supported the administration in the assembly. In her second term, she was a member of the Kosovo and Metohija committee; the committee on labour, veterans affairs, and social affairs; and the parliamentary friendship groups with Japan and Russia.

Serbia organized its own local elections in Kosovo in 2008; while not recognized internationally, these provided de facto validation for local authorities in the Serb-dominated communities of northern Kosovo, including Zvečan. The Republic of Kosovo organized its own new local elections in 2009; in accordance with the Serbian government's position, Petković called for the Serb community to boycott the vote.

Serbis's electoral system was reformed in 2011, such that parliamentary mandates were awarded in numerical order to candidates on successful lists. For the 2012 Serbian parliamentary election, G17 Plus formed an alliance with various local parties called the United Regions of Serbia (URS). Petković appeared in the sixtieth position on the coalition's list; the list won only sixteen seats and she was not re-elected.

=== Local politics in Zvečan (2012–13) ===
Petković led a URS list in Zvečan for 2012 local elections that were not officially recognized by Serbia or the Republic of Kosovo. She was elected when the list won seven seats. Incumbent Zvečan mayor Dragiša Milović of the Democratic Party of Serbia (DSS) was confirmed for another term in office after the election. Shortly thereafter, Petković indicated that the URS was dissatisfied with the behaviour of the ruling majority and would not participate in the work of the assembly.

In May 2012, Petković endorsed the partition of Kosovo as a means of ensuring the Serb community in the north would remain integrated with Serbian institutions. G17 Plus formally merged into the United Regions of Serbia when the latter group was registered as a political party in April 2013, and Petković became a member of the new URS organization. The Serbian government dissolved the local assemblies of northern Kosovo's predominantly Serb municipalities, including Zvečan, in September 2013.

Petković was seriously injured in a car accident in November 2013. She has not returned to public life since this time.
