= Snežana Paunović =

Serbian politician

- Снежана Пауновић
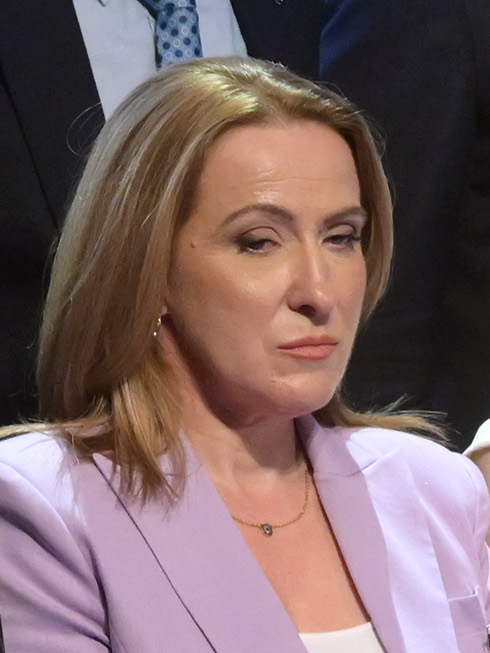
- Paunović in 2025

Minister of State Administration and Local Self-Government
- Incumbent
- Assumed office 16 April 2025
- Prime Minister: Đuro Macut
- Preceded by: Jelena Žarić Kovačević

Vice President of the National Assembly of the Republic of Serbia
- In office 20 March 2024 – 15 April 2025
- In office 2 August 2022 – 6 February 2024

Member of the National Assembly of the Republic of Serbia
- In office 3 June 2016 – 15 April 2025
- In office 29 October 2013 – 16 April 2014

Coordinator for Dečani (recognized by Serbia)
- In office 28 June 2010 – 2013
- Preceded by: Zoran Barović (mayor recognized by Serbia)
- Succeeded by: Vuko Vuković

Coordinator for Đakovica (recognized by Serbia)
- In office 12 January 2006 – 24 July 2008
- Preceded by: Momčilo Stanojević (mayor during the Kosovo War)
- Succeeded by: Đokica Stanojević (mayor recognized by Serbia)

Personal details
- Born: 20 March 1975 (age 51) Peć, SR Serbia, SFR Yugoslavia
- Party: SPS

Snežana Paunović (Serbian Cyrillic: Снежана Пауновић; born 20 March 1975) is a Serbian politician. She has served several terms in the Serbian national assembly and was one of the assembly's vice-presidents (i.e., deputy speakers) on two occasions. She has served as minister of Public Administration and Local Self-Government since 2025. Paunović is a member of the Socialist Party of Serbia (SPS).

== Early life and private career ==
Paunović was born to a Kosovo Serb family in Peć, in what was then the Socialist Autonomous Province of Kosovo in the Socialist Republic of Serbia, Socialist Federal Republic of Yugoslavia. Almost all of Peć's Serb community was displaced at the end of the 1998–99 Kosovo War, and Paunović relocated to Belgrade at this time. She continues to identify Peć as her home community in her parliamentary profile.

Paunović is a graduated economist. She became the acting director of Peć Pharmacy in 2014 and was at one time a board member of Serbia's Agency for the Development of Small and Medium Enterprises. She was also president of the supervisory board of the Belgrade Nikola Tesla Airport before standing down from the board in early 2015.

== Politician ==
Paunović joined the Socialist Party of Serbia in 1992.

=== Kosovo Serb representative (2006–13) ===
In January 2006, the Serbian government appointed coordinators for most municipalities in the disputed province of Kosovo. The position was roughly equivalent to mayor, although actual responsibilities varied significantly between different jurisdictions; in some cases, the coordinators were primarily responsible for the interests of Serb refugee communities. Paunović was appointed as coordinator for Đakovica, where, as in Peć, virtually the entire Serb community had been displaced in 1999.

Following the Republic of Kosovo's unilateral declaration of independence in 2008, the Serbian government controversially held its own municipal elections within the territory and among Kosovo Serb refugee communities. Paunović was elected as a SPS member of the Peć local assembly, which met in Central Serbia; a coalition of the Democratic Party of Serbia (DSS) and New Serbia (NS) won a narrow and contentious victory for the municipality, and she served as a member of the opposition. A new administration was also constituted for Đakovica during this time, and she stood down as coordinator.

The Peć municipal government elected in 2008 proved unstable, and the assembly was dissolved for a new election in August 2009. This election was won by the Socialist Party. Online sources do not indicate if Paunović was re-elected to the assembly.

In June 2010, the Serbian government dissolved the assemblies for seven Kosovo municipalities, charging they had become dysfunctional and inefficient. Paunović was appointed as the new coordinator for Dečani, one of the municipalities in question. As in Peć and Đakovica, practically the entire Serb community of Dečani had been forced into exile in 1999. In November 2010, Paunović reported that graves in a local Serbian Orthodox cemetery had been desecrated. In 2012, she and other Kosovo Serb officials took part in negotiations with Serbian president Tomislav Nikolić on the future of Kosovo and the status of its Serb community. She stood down as coordinator for Dečani in 2013.

=== Parliamentarian (2013–14, 2016–2025) ===
Paunović appeared in the 180th position on the Socialist Party's electoral list in the 2007 Serbian parliamentary election. The list won sixteen seats, and she was not given a mandate. (From 2000 to 2011, Serbian parliamentary mandates were awarded to sponsoring parties or coalitions rather than to individual candidates, and it was common practice for the mandates to be assigned out of numerical order. Paunović could have been included in the SPS assembly delegation in 2007 despite her low position on the list, but this did not occur.)

Serbia's electoral system was reformed in 2011, such that all parliamentary mandates were awarded to candidates on successful lists in numerical order. Paunović was given the fifty-seventh position on the Socialist Party's list in the 2012 parliamentary election. The list won forty-four mandates. While not immediately elected, she received a mandate on 29 October 2013 as the replacement for Neđo Jovanović, who had resigned to take a state secretary position. The SPS served in a coalition government with the Serbian Progressive Party (SNS) during this time, and Paunović supported the administration in the assembly. She was not a candidate in the 2014 parliamentary election.

She appeared in the twenty-first position on the Socialist Party's list in the 2016 parliamentary election and was elected when the list won twenty-nine mandates. The SPS remained a part of Serbia's SNS-led government after the election. In her second term, Paunović was a member of the culture and information committee; a deputy member of the committee on Kosovo and Metohija, the committee on the diaspora and Serbs in the region, and the economy committee; (Note: Formally known as the Committee on the Economy, Regional Development, Trade, Tourism, and Energy.) and a member of the parliamentary friendship groups with Australia, Belarus, Belgium, Croatia, Cuba, Kazakhstan, Russia, Spain, Switzerland, and the United Arab Emirates.

Paunović received the twentieth position on the SPS's list in the 2020 parliamentary election and was re-elected when the list won thirty-two seats. In the term that followed, she was promoted to deputy leader of the SPS assembly group and deputy chair of the culture and information committee. She also served as a member of the economy committee, a deputy member of the committee on Kosovo and Metohija and the agriculture committee, (Note: Formally known as the Agriculture, Forestry, and Water Management Committee.) a member of Serbia's delegation to the NATO parliamentary assembly (where Serbia has observer status), the leader of Serbia's friendship groups with Jamaica and Japan, and a member of twenty-seven other friendship groups. (Note: She was a member of the friendship groups with Albania, Bahrain, Belarus, Belgium, Brazil, Bulgaria, Burundi, the Czech Republic, Denmark, Finland, Germany, Ghana, Ireland, Italy, Malta, Montenegro, Morocco, the Netherlands, Portugal, Russia, Sierra Leone, the Sovereign Order of Malta, Spain, Sweden, the United Arab Emirates, the United Kingdom, and the United States of America.)

Paunović was promoted to the eighth position on the SPS's list in the 2022 parliamentary election and was elected to a fourth term when the list won thirty-one seats. She was chosen as a deputy speaker of the assembly in August 2022 and as leader of the SPS assembly group in October 2022. During her fourth term, she was also a member of the committee on Kosovo and Metohija, the economy committee, and the committee on the rights of the child; a deputy member of finance committee (Note: Formally known as the Committee on Finance, State Budget, and Control of Public Spending.) and the administrative committee; (Note: Formally known as the Committee on Administrative, Budgetary, Mandate, and Immunity Issues.) a member of Serbia's delegation to the Inter-Parliamentary Union assembly; the leader of Serbia's friendship group with Japan; and a member of thirty-six other friendship groups. (Note: She was a member of the friendship groups with Albania, Argentina, Belgium, Cuba, the Czech Republic, the Democratic Republic of the Congo, Djibouti, Egypt, Finland, France, Germany, Greece, Guinea-Bissau, Iceland, India, Italy, Jamaica, Kuwait, Lithuania, the Maldives, Malta, Mexico, Morocco, New Zealand and the Pacific Ocean Countries (Fiji, Nauru, Palau, Papua New Guinea, the Solomon Islands, Tuvalu, Vanuatu), North Macedonia, Portugal, Russia, Sao Tome and Principe, Sierra Leone, Spain, Suriname, Sweden, Switzerland, the United Arab Emirates, the United Kingdom, and the United States of America.)

In the 2023 Kosovan local elections sponsored by the Republic of Kosovo government, candidates representing Albanian parties won the mayoralties of four predominantly Serb municipalities in northern Kosovo due to a Serb boycott. Paunović described the elections as lacking any legitimacy and criticized Priština officials for allowing the results to stand. She was quoted as saying, "The arrogance and insolence of [Republic of Kosovo prime minister] Albin Kurti hits the upper limit. It is Kurti's ugly, hellish plan to put pressure, first of all, on the north of Kosovo and Metohija and empty it of Serbs."

Paunović was given the fourth position on the SPS's list in the 2023 parliamentary election and was re-elected even as the list fell to eighteen seats overall. She was chosen afterward for another term as deputy speaker and once again became the leader of the SPS assembly group. She also served as chair of the economy committee and was a member of the administrative committee and the committee on the rights of the child, a deputy member of the finance committee and the committee on Kosovo–Metohija, once again a member of Serbia's delegation to the Inter-Parliamentary Union assembly, the head of Serbia's friendship group with Japan, and a member of twenty-five other friendship groups. (Note: She was a member of the friendship groups with Argentina; Australia, New Zealand, and the Pacific Ocean countries (Vanuatu, Tuvalu, Fiji, Nauru, Palau, Papua New Guinea, and the Solomon Islands); the Benelux countries; China; Cuba; the Czech Republic; the Democratic Republic of the Congo; Finland; France; Ghana; Germany; Greece; India; Italy and the Holy See; Malta; Mexico; Portugal; Russia; Sao Tome and Principe; Spain; Sweden; Switzerland; the United Arab Emirates; the United Kingdom; and the United States of America.)

In June 2024, Paunović and Uglješa Marković, Serbia's delegates to a conference of the Berlin Process in Montenegro, walked out of the meeting due to what they described as unjustified attacks against Serbia and its president Aleksandar Vučić.

Paunović said in October 2024 that she regretted having supported Aleksandar Šapić for mayor of Belgrade in the previous local elections.

On 16 April 2025, Paunović appointed as the minister of public administration and local self - government.

=== "Ethnic cleansing" controversy ===
On 11 July 2026, Paunović stated in an interview with Kurir that she would have "ethnically cleansed" Kosovo in 1998 had she been in Slobodan Milošević's position (i.e., as president of the Federal Republic of Yugoslavia). KosSev translates her comments as follows: "If I were Slobodan Milošević, I would have ethnically cleansed Kosovo in 1998. [...] But not in a way that I would liquidate them, the way they are trying to ethnically cleanse Kosovo to this day. But in a way that everyone who feels less like a resident of the Federal Republic of Yugoslavia leaves it and goes to their home country."

Paunović's comments prompted a firestorm of controversy. Opposition parties in Serbia, including the Movement of Free Citizens (PSG), Green–Left Front (ZLF), and Democratic Party (DS), all called for her to be dismissed from office. Xhelal Sveçla, the minister of internal affairs in the Republic of Kosovo government, declared Paunović persona non grata and permanently banned her from entering or transiting through Kosovo; in so doing, Sveçla also accused Serbia of having "never given up on the project of ethnic cleansing of Albanians." A European Union representative also condemned Paunović's comments, saying "there is no place in Europe for rhetoric justifying and advocating for ethnic cleansing," while also urging leaders on all sides to "refrain from any inflammatory rhetoric."

Serbian president Aleksandar Vučić addressed the controversy on 15 July 2026, saying that Paunović's statement "does not reflect the policy or the will of the President of Serbia and the Government of Serbia. We must be responsible. Our policy must be dialogue, compromises, talks, and never ethnic cleansing." He added that although Paunović was herself a victim of ethnic cleansing in the 1990s, this did not justify her comments.
