= Milivoje Ribać =

Kosovo Serb politician

Milivoje Ribać (Serbian Cyrillic: Миливоје Рибаћ; born 4 March 1952) is a Kosovo Serb politician and community leader. He has served in the National Assembly of Serbia and represented displaced Serbs from Kosovo in seeking to return to their home communities.

== Early life and career ==
Ribać was born in the village of Drsnik in Klina, in what was then the Autonomous Region of Kosovo and Metohija in the People's Republic of Serbia, Federal People's Republic of Yugoslavia. His family had resided in the area for more than six centuries. He attended elementary school in Klina, graduated from mechanical-technical secondary school in Uroševac, and studied mechanical engineering in Priština. Due to a poor financial situation and political uncertainty in the province, he was not able to complete the program. He later taught mathematics at Klina's secondary school and was a technologist in the Zastava Arms plant in Klina. From 1989 to 1993, he was president of Klina's municipal trade union council.

In the 1980s, he was an organizer and coordinator for the Serbian Resistance Movement in Metohija. Following the 1998–99 Kosovo War and the NATO bombing of Yugoslavia, Ribać was forced to leave Kosovo for Central Serbia.

== Politician ==
Ribać began his political career as a member of the Socialist Party of Serbia (SPS) and was elected to the national assembly without opposition in the 1990 parliamentary election for the constituency of Srbica and Klina. The Socialists won a majority victory, and he served as a government supporter. He was not a candidate in the 1992 parliamentary election, in which the country switched to a system of proportional representation.

Serbia's political culture in the 1990s was dominated by the authoritarian rule of SPS leader Slobodan Milošević. Ribać was one of a small number of politicians who left the SPS during the Milošević years and joined the opposition. He became a member of the Democratic Party (DS), organized its municipal organization in Klina in 1997, and served on the party's executive board.

The Democratic Party contested the 2000 Yugoslavian general election as part of the Democratic Opposition of Serbia (DOS), a broad and ideologically diverse coalition of parties opposed to Milošević's administration. DOS candidate Vojislav Koštunica defeated Milošević in the presidential election, a watershed moment in Serbian and Yugoslavian politics. Ribać was a DOS candidate for Yugoslavia's Chamber of Citizens, appearing in the seventh position on the coalition's electoral list for the Prokuplje division, which included polling stations for displaced Serbs from several Kosovo municipalities. The DOS won four out of ten seats in the division, and he was not given a mandate. (For the 2000 Yugoslavian elections, half of the assembly mandates were awarded to candidates on successful lists in numerical order while the other half were assigned at the discretion of the sponsoring parties or coalitions. Ribać could have been given a mandate despite his list position, but this did not occur.)

Serbia's government fell after Milošević's defeat, and a new Serbian parliamentary election was held in December 2000. Prior to the vote, Serbia's electoral laws were reformed such that the entire country became a single electoral division and all mandates were awarded to candidates on successful lists at the discretion of the sponsoring parties, irrespective of numerical order. Rabić was given the 190th position on the DOS list and was not initially included in the coalition's assembly delegation when the list won a landslide majority victory with 176 out of 250 seats.

In October 2001, Ribać was elected to the DS's presidency.

Ribać was awarded an assembly mandate under somewhat dubious circumstances on 12 June 2002. The DOS leadership invalidated the mandates of several delegates from the Democratic Party of Serbia (DSS), which had previously been one of the leading parties in the coalition but was by this time in the process of withdrawing from it. Ribać was one of the DOS candidates chosen for a replacement mandate. The DOS's actions were later invalidated on a legal technicality, and the DSS mandates were restored; Ribać was unable to take his seat.

The DOS dissolved entirely in 2003, and the DS contested the 2003 parliamentary election on its own. Ribać received the 162nd position on the party's list and was not given a new mandate when it won thirty-seven seats.

== Community leader ==
After the end of the Kosovo War and the flight of many Kosovo Serbs into Central Serbia, Ribać became an advocate for the safe return of displaced persons to the province. In March 2002, he complained that a representative from the United Nations Interim Administration Mission in Kosovo (UNMIK) had told him there was no money from the international community for the return of displaced Serbs. In 2003, he said that both the international community and Kosovo's Albanian leadership were blocking Serb returns.

After Kosovo's unilateral declaration of independence in 2008, the Serbian government controversially oversaw its own local elections across Kosovo, creating what were in effect parallel administrations. In June 2010, the Serbian government dissolved the local assemblies for seven municipalities, including Klina, on the grounds that they had become dysfunctional and inefficient. The government then appointed coordinators to oversee these municipalities; Ribać was appointed as the coordinator for Klina and served in this role until 2013.:

Former Democratic party leader Boris Tadić left the DS to establish the New Democratic Party (NDS) in 2014. Ribać became a member of the new party.

== Electoral record ==
=== National Assembly of Serbia ===
1990 Serbian parliamentary election: Srbica and Klina
Candidate	Party
Milivoje Ribać (***WINNER WITHOUT OPPOSITION***)	Socialist Party of Serbia
Total
