= Dragomir Pavlović (Serbian politician, born 1957) =

Kosovo Serb politician (born 1957)

Dragomir M. Pavlović (Serbian Cyrillic: Драгомир М. Павловић; born 30 July 1957) is a Kosovo Serb former politician. He served in the assemblies of Serbia and the Federal Republic of Yugoslavia between 1992 and 2001 as a member of the Socialist Party of Serbia (SPS).

== Early life and career ==
Pavlović was born in Klina, in what was then the Autonomous Region of Kosovo and Metohija in the People's Republic of Serbia, Federal People's Republic of Yugoslavia. He graduated from the University of Pristina's Faculty of Philosophy and was a professor.

== Politician ==
=== Yugoslavian Chamber of Citizens ===
The Federal Republic of Yugoslavia was established in April 1992, comprising the republics of Serbia and Montenegro. The first elections for its Chamber of Citizens took place in May 1992, with half the seats determined by proportional representation and the other half by first-past-the-post elections in single-member constituencies. Pavlović was elected for the Đakovica constituency seat in Kosovo; the SPS and its allies won the election, and he served as a supporter of the government.

=== National Assembly of Serbia ===
The May 1992 Yugoslavian election was widely considered as lacking legitimacy due to a boycott by several opposition parties, and a new election was called for December 1992. Pavlović did not seek re-election to the federal parliament but was instead a candidate in the concurrent 1992 Serbian parliamentary election, which was held under a system of full proportional representation with the country divided into nine electoral units. He appeared in the second position on the SPS's electoral list for the Priština division, which encompassed almost all of Kosovo. From 1992 to 2000, Serbia's electoral law stipulated that one-third of parliamentary mandates would be assigned to candidates on successful lists in numerical order, while the remaining two-thirds would be distributed amongst other candidates at the discretion of sponsoring parties or coalitions. Pavlović was automatically elected when the Socialists won thirteen out of twenty-four seats in the division. He served on the committee for environmental protection in the parliament that followed.

The SPS held a minority government after the 1992 Serbian election and was dependent on informal parliamentary support from the far-right Serbian Radical Party (SRS). The alliance between these parties broke down in mid-1993, and a new Serbian parliamentary election was held in December of that year. Pavlović was assigned the fourteenth position on the SPS's list for Priština and was chosen for a new mandate when the party won a landslide victory with twenty-one out of twenty-four seats in the division. The SPS emerged from the election in a stronger position overall and led a stable coalition government in the term that followed. During this term, Pavlović served on the committee for administrative and mandate-immunity issues.

Serbia's electoral divisions were restructured prior to the 1997 parliamentary election. Pavlović appeared in the fifth position on the SPS's list for Peć and was given a mandate for a third term in the republican parliament when the list won twelve out of fourteen seats. The SPS formed a new administration with the Radical Party and the Yugoslav Left (JUL) after the election, and Pavlović continued to serve as a government supporter.

Serbian and Yugoslavian politics in the 1990s were dominated by the authoritarian rule of SPS leader Slobodan Milošević. Elections in Kosovo took place against the backdrop of a boycott by the province's majority Albanian community, and many international observers considered that the SPS's success in Kosovo in 1997 was accomplished by electoral fraud. Following the 1997 campaign, SRS organizer Dragan Todorović said that one of the polling stations in Klina had been in Pavlović's house and that members of Pavlović's family had attacked Radical Party activists who arrived in the area.

Serbia lost effective control over most of Kosovo after the 1998–99 Kosovo War, and Milošević fell from power in the aftermath of the 2000 Yugoslavian presidential election. A new Serbian parliamentary election was held in December 2000, shortly after Milošević's fall; Serbia's electoral laws were reformed prior to the election, such that the entire country became a single electoral division and all mandates were awarded to candidates on successful lists at the discretion of sponsoring parties, irrespective of numerical order. Pavlović appeared in the 164th position on the SPS list, which was mostly alphabetical. The list won thirty-seven seats, and he was not included in the party's new assembly delegation.

=== Local politics in Kosovo ===
Pavlović later left the Socialist Party and founded his own Metohija political movement.

The Serbian government oversaw local elections in Kosovo in 2008 as a response to Kosovo's unilateral declaration of independence in February of that year. This electoral cycle created what were in effect "parallel" local administrations in Kosovo's municipalities. The Metohija movement contested the election in Klina and won five out of twenty-five available seats. After the election, Metohija joined a local coalition government led by the Democratic Party of Serbia (DSS), and Pavlović was named as deputy mayor. In 2010, the Serbian government dissolved the assemblies of seven Kosovo municipalities, including Klina, on the grounds that they had become dysfunctional and inefficient.

== Electoral record ==
=== Federal (FR Yugoslavia) ===
May 1992 Yugoslavian federal election: Đakovica
Candidate	Party	Votes	%
Dragomir Pavlović	Socialist Party of Serbia	4,295	49.06
Živorad Grković	Citizens' Group	1,818	20.77
Mileva Tomović	Citizens' Group	1,293	14.77
Mileta Ivanović	Serbian Radical Party	963	11.00
Aleksa Dragojević	League of Communists – Movement for Yugoslavia	386	4.41
Total		8,755	100.00
