= Đokica Stanojević =

Kosovo Serb politician

Đokica Stanojević (Serbian Cyrillic: Ђокица Станојевић; born 1956) is a Kosovo Serb politician and community leader. During the 1990s, he served as mayor of Đakovica and was a parliamentarian in the Federal Republic of Yugoslavia. Since the Kosovo War (1998–99), he has been active in seeking the return of Đakovica's displaced Serb population.

== Early life and career ==
Stanojević was born to a prominent local family that had lived in Đakovica since the Middle Ages. At the time of his birth, the city was located in the Autonomous Region of Kosovo and Metohija in the People's Republic of Serbia, Federal People's Republic of Yugoslavia.

Stanojević is a graduated economist. In his youth, he played for KF Vëllaznimi. He was later manager of the local Secondary School of Economics, headmaster of the same school, managing director of the Metaliku company, and managing director of the Bambi wine and juice factory.

== Politician ==
=== 1990s ===
Stanojević led the Đakovica municipal assembly's executive committee after the 1989 Serbian local elections, serving until 1992. On 18 January 1995, he was appointed by the Serbian government to lead a provisional administration in the municipality; this position was equivalent to mayor. He stood down from the role in 1996.

The Socialist Party won all five available seats in the Peć division (which included Đakovica) in the 1996 Yugoslavian parliamentary election. Stanojević subsequently served as one of the party's representatives in the federal assembly. Online sources do not clarify if he was elected in 1996 or became a replacement delegate at a later time; the former scenario is more likely.

Kosovo's majority Albanian community largely boycotted Serbian and Yugoslavian elections during the 1990s and participated in parallel institutions.

=== After the Kosovo War ===
Following the 1998–99 Kosovo War, almost every member of Đakovica's formerly significant Serb community fled the area for Central Serbia. Stanojević was forced to leave behind significant property holdings in city. He and other Serb refugees later appealed to the United Nations High Commissioner for Refugees (UNHCR) to safely return to the area; the Serbian government has raised this as a human rights issue and has noted that hostility from local authorities has made a safe return impossible for Serb citizens.

Following Kosovo's unilateral declaration of independence in 2008, the Serbian government controversially oversaw its own local elections across Kosovo's municipalities. Displaced persons took part in the vote, and in several jurisdictions including Đakovica the municipal assemblies met in Central Serbia rather than their home communities. Stanojević led an independent list to victory over the Socialist Party in Đakovica and was recognized afterward by the Serbian government as the municipality's mayor. Serbia dissolved the Đakovica assembly in 2010, charging that it had become inefficient, and appointed Stanojević as coordinator for the municipality. He appears to have held this role until 2013, when Serbia restructured its local authorities in Kosovo following the Brussels Agreement.

Beginning in 2013, the Serbian government encouraged Kosovo Serbs to participate in local elections overseen by Priština while also maintaining its own parallel local authorities. Stanojević led the Serb Civic Initiative's list in Đakovica in the 2013 Kosovan local elections. This met with opposition from some Albanian residents of the city, who described him as a war criminal for his alleged actions during the Kosovo War. The list did not, in any event, win any seats in the local assembly.

== Community leader ==
Stanojević has been a leader in Đakovica's displaced Serb community for several years. Since the end of the Kosovo War, he has organized several pilgrimages by Đakovica Serbs to the city and the surrounding area for religious purposes. These have sometimes been met by local protests.

In 2013, an Easter visit to Đakovica's Church of the Assumption was stopped in mid-journey by the Priština authorities and forced to return to Central Serbia due to protests outside the church by Vetëvendosje. Stanojević accused Priština of failing to protect the human rights of the Serb community, including freedom of movement and freedom of religion.

Stanojević led a pilgrimage of Serbs to the Visoki Dečani monastery in 2014. The following year, he said that a planned visit to Đakovica had been called off due to appeals over security concerns from the American embassy and the United Nations Interim Administration Mission in Kosovo (UNMIK).

In 2018, a group of citizens in Đakovica accused Stanojević of war crimes during the Kosovo War, charging that he had welcomed Serb paramilitaries to the city. He responded, "These are pure lies. Their intention is to scare me and use fabricated evidence to prevent my and other displaced Serbs from Đakovica from visiting that city, the Orthodox cemeteries and the Orthodox church."

Stanojević criticized Aleksandar Vučić and the Serb List in a 2021 interview. He described the List as "created in Belgrade" and "imposed on Serbs in Kosovo," and said of Vučić, "According to the Constitution, [he] is obliged to protect every citizen of Serbia. He sends a message that we should say goodbye to Kosovo and stop thinking about returning, property and the graves of our loved ones. After every such statement by Vučić, a new wave of emigration of both living and dead Serbs will start from Kosovo."
