= Slaviša Ristić =

Serbian politician

- Славиша Ристић
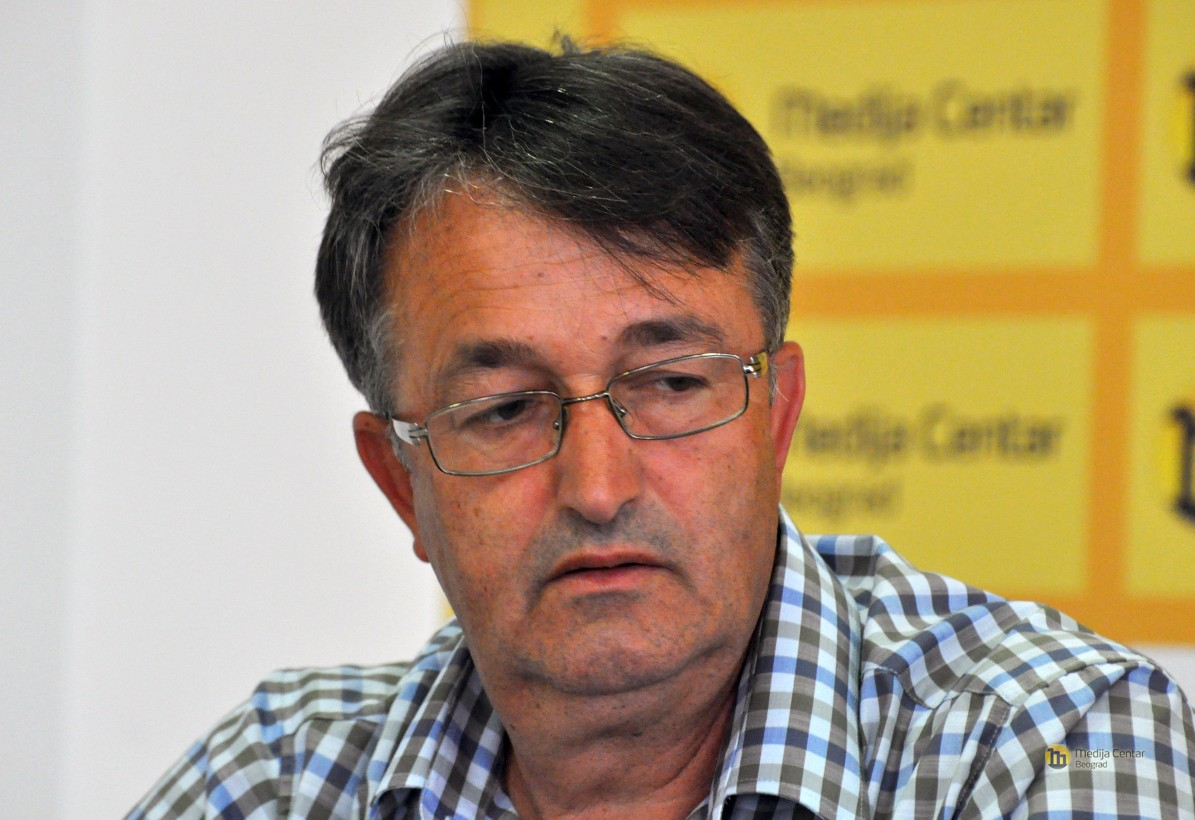

Leader of Otadžbina
- Incumbent
- Assumed office 2018
- Preceded by: Aleksandar Vasić

Member of the National Assembly of the Republic of Serbia
- In office 1 August 2022 – 6 February 2024
- In office 3 June 2016 – 3 August 2020

Mayor/Coordinator of Zubin Potok (recognized by Serbia)
- In office 12 January 2006 – 9 September 2013
- Preceded by: Srđan Vulović (mayor following the 1996 Serbian local elections)
- Succeeded by: Stevan Vulović

Mayor of Zubin Potok (recognized by the Republic of Kosovo) Note: Ristić did not acknowledge the Republic of Kosovo's decision of recognize him as mayor.
- In office 17 February 2008 – 2013
- Preceded by: position established
- Succeeded by: Stevan Vulović

Mayor of Zubin Potok (recognized by UNMIK)
- In office 2001 – 17 February 2008
- Preceded by: Guy Sands-Pingot

Chair of the Executive Council of Zubin Potok
- In office 1993–1996

Personal details
- Born: 17 November 1961 (age 64) Zubin Potok, PR Serbia, FPR Yugoslavia
- Party: DS (1990–1992); DSS (1992–2016); Fatherland (2017–present)
- Education: University of Priština

Slaviša Ristić (Serbian Cyrillic: Славиша Ристић; born 17 November 1961) is a Serbian politician and a prominent figure in the Kosovo Serb community. He was for many years the president (i.e., mayor) of Zubin Potok, a predominantly Serb municipality in northern Kosovo, and has served two terms in the National Assembly of Serbia.

A member of the Democratic Party of Serbia (DSS) many years, Ristić left the party in late 2016 and has been the leader of the Otadžbina (English: "Fatherland") political movement since 2018. He is a vocal critic of Serbian president Aleksandar Vučić and the governing Serbian Progressive Party (SNS).

== Private career ==
Ristić was born in Zubin Potok, in what was then the Autonomous Region of Kosovo and Metohija in the People's Republic of Serbia, Federal People's Republic of Yugoslavia. He has a bachelor's degree in economics from the University of Priština.

== Politician ==
Ristić joined the opposition Democratic Party (DS) on its formation in 1990. After a split two years later, he became a founding member of the DSS. In the 1990s, he was one of the few leading Kosovo Serb politicians to oppose the policies of Slobodan Milošević's government.

He became the president of Zubin Potok's executive council (i.e., the leader of its local government) after the December 1992 local elections and served in this role from 1993 to 1996. Milošević's Socialist Party of Serbia (SPS) won the 1996 local elections in Zubin Potok, and his term in office came to an end.

Following the 1998–99 Kosovo War, Ristić chaired the municipal committee of the Serbian National Council in Zubin Potok. He attended talks in Washington, D.C., as a representative of the council in July 2000; the talks did not deal with the status of Kosovo but rather with ending the ongoing violence between Serb and Albanian communities and creating the conditions for the development of democratic institutions in the region. He strongly opposed the introduction of customs checkpoints on Kosovo's border with Central Serbia in 2001.

=== Mayor of Zubin Potok ===
Serbs in northern Kosovo generally boycotted the 2000 local elections in Kosovo, which were overseen by the United Nations Interim Administration Mission in Kosovo (UNMIK) and the Organisation for Economic Co-operation and Development (OECD). The results in Zubin Potok and two neighbouring Serb municipalities were not certified due to low turnout. Following the vote, UNMIK leader Bernard Kouchner said that he would appoint prominent members of the Serb community as councillors in these areas. As an extension of this process, Ristić became mayor of Zubin Potok in 2001. The Serb community later participated in 2002 local elections overseen by UNMIK and the OECD; the DSS won a significant victory in Zubin Potok, and Ristić was confirmed afterward for another term as mayor.

In January 2006, the Serbian government appointed coordinators for most municipalities in Kosovo. Ristić was appointed as coordinator for Zubin Potok. This position was generally equivalent to mayor, though as recognized by the Republic of Serbia rather than by UNMIK.

Ristić, like most Kosovo Serb leaders, strongly opposes the secession of Kosovo from Serbia and the establishment of an independent state of Kosovo. In 2006, he was quoted as saying, "No one will force us to accept Priština's authority, which is hostile to Serb people. Serbs do not want a partition [of Kosovo], but if it comes to that, it will be the fault of the international community for succumbing to an ultimatum of independence by (Kosovo) Albanians." During subsequent discussions between Serbs and Albanians in the province meditated by the United Nations, he said, "We want co-operation with the Albanian community but we cannot cooperate with the Kosovo government which is working purely for independence."

In 2007, he remarked that a visit by United States president George W. Bush to Kosovo could only be interpreted as providing support for independence. He was quoted as saying, "The message that he would be sending by his visit would come as nothing new to us Serbs in Kosmet [Kosovo and Metohija], because the United States has already openly stated its position on Kosmet's status, which is support for independence. [...] I do not think that Bush's visit would provoke any particular reaction from the Serb community, because we have become used to this kind of behaviour from the United States." Later in the year, Ristić was a delegate of the Kosovo Serb community in discussions with representatives of the Contact Group.

The Serb community in Kosovo's northern municipalities generally boycotted the 2007 local elections overseen by Priština. In Zubin Potok, representatives of Albanian parties won the election on the basis of an extremely low turnout; due to the Serb boycott, the results were not recognized. Ristić did not consider the elections legitimate and was not a participant. When the Republic of Kosovo issued its unilateral declaration of independence in February 2008, he said that Zubin Potok would not engage with the Priština government. "We cannot allow the institutions of a nonexistent state to be imposed on us and to pay taxes to some independent Kosovo," he said. "That is impossible."

Riots broke out at two United Nations border crossings near Zubin Potok after the declaration of independence, resulting in the destruction of checkpoints on the roads into Central Serbia. Ristić said that the riots had been prompted by the Priština government's announcement that it would send its officials to monitor the border. He added that his municipal forces had acted to prevent the violence from escalating (remarking that no-one was injured), drew attention to the anger of Serbs over the declaration of independence, and urged international authorities not to support "the false state of Kosovo in its attempts to set up its authorities in the territory of our municipalities."

The Serbian government controversially oversaw its own its own local elections in Kosovo in May 2008. The DSS won a majority victory in Zubin Potok and Ristić continued to serve as mayor. Later in 2008, Ristić led a protest against both the deployment of the European Union Rule of Law Mission in Kosovo (EULEX) and an effort to re-introduce cameras to the border crossings; he described the latter development as "the first step in re-establishing the customs zone." He later became reconciled to the presence of EULEX (following changes to the terms of its mission), although he suspended Zubin Potok's co-operation with the agency in July 2011, charging that it had become "a force of occupation."

==== North Kosovo crisis ====
In July 2011, Kosovo Police overseen by the Republic of Kosovo ministry of internal affairs crossed into the predominantly Serb municipalities of northern Kosovo, without consulting either Serbia or KFOR/EULEX, in an attempt to assert control over administrative border crossings. This action precipitated the 2011–13 North Kosovo crisis, in which the Jarinje administrative checkpoint was burned down and protestors from the Serb community blocked access to the area's roads over a period of several months. Relations between Serb protestors and the international forces were often tense throughout this time. Ristić said that Kosovo Serbs would use peaceful methods of protest such as barricades and roadblocks, though he added that it would be "impossible to control the situation" if the Priština government or the international deployments introduced the use of force. On one occasion, he led the Zubin Potok community in a high-profile standoff against North Atlantic Treaty Organization (NATO) forces over access to the checkpoints; during this action, the protestors defied a NATO deadline to remove their roadblocks. Ristić said that his community would only permit KFOR and EULEX forces to cross the barricades "when they will confirm their neutrality ... and withdraw Kosovo customs officials from the two crossings."

A December 2011 report in the Serbian paper Blic described Ristić as the most important figure in coordinating the local Serb community's actions in response to the crisis, and as enjoying support from the local electorate that transcended normal party divisions.

Ristić and other Kosovo Serb leaders met with Serbian president Boris Tadić several times during the crisis in a bid to resolve the situation; their talks were unsuccessful. Ristić announced the removal of the barricades in February 2012 with the underlying issues still unresolved.

In May 2012, municipal authorities in Zubin Potok and the neighbouring community of Zvečan organized new local elections, as their mandates from the previous cycle were drawing to a close. The broader diplomatic situation had changed since 2008, and these elections were not recognized as legitimate by either Belgrade or Priština. The DSS won another majority victory in Zubin Potok and Ristić once again continued to serve as mayor. Despite its opposition to the vote, the Serbian government did not overturn the results.

The Belgrade and Priština governments agreed to a system of integrated border management in northern Kosovo later in late 2012. Ristić and other Kosovo Serb leaders met with Tadić's successor Tomislav Nikolić and Serbian prime minister Ivica Dačić prior to the implementation of the new system. After the meeting, Ristić was quoted as saying, "If we receive some sort of guarantee that we will not pay customs at the borders to the sham state of Kosovo, that no one will force us to change our citizenships and personal documents, then we will certainly not create any problems [...] We do not plan to create problems anyhow, apart from exercising our right to pursue the peaceful protests because we cannot allow anyone to force Priština's will upon us." He later led a further round of protests at the border crossing when these guarantees were not provided, though in December 2012 he acknowledged that there was insufficient popular turnout from within the Serb community for the protests to continue.

==== Opposition to the 2013 Brussels Agreement ====
Ristić criticized the absence of Kosovo Serb voices from the negotiations that led to the 2013 Brussels Agreement, which normalized some relations between Belgrade and Priština while leaving larger questions on the status of the territory unresolved. He ultimately rejected the agreement and led protests against its implementation. He was quoted as saying, "It is not an agreement, it is a surrender; they have killed the state in these parts and betrayed Serbs in Kosovo-Metohija."

Serbian political leaders such as Dačić and Aleksandar Vučić later took part in discussions with Ristić and other Kosovo Serb leaders in a bid to win their support for the agreement. These talks were unsuccessful. Ristić also rejected the Serbian government's call for Kosovo Serbs to participate in the 2013 local elections in Kosovo overseen by the Priština government.

The Serbian government dissolved the municipal assemblies of Zubin Potok and three other Serb municipalities in northern Kosovo in September 2013, bringing Ristić's tenure as mayor to an end. Despite Ristić's opposition, several members of the Serb community participated in the local elections overseen by Priština later in the year.

=== Politics at the republic level ===
Ristić appeared in the 120th position on a combined electoral list of the Democratic Party of Serbia and New Serbia (NS) in the 2008 Serbian parliamentary elections. The list won thirty seats, and he was not included afterward in the DSS's assembly delegation. (From 2000 to 2011, Serbian parliamentary mandates were awarded to sponsoring parties or coalitions rather than to individual candidates, and it was common practice for the mandates to be assigned out of numerical order. Ristić could have been included in his party's delegation despite his position on the list, though ultimately he was not.)

Serbia's electoral system was reformed in 2011, such that all parliamentary mandates were awarded to candidates on successful lists in numerical order. Ristić received the eighth position on the DSS's electoral list for the 2014 parliamentary election. The party did not, on this occasion, receive enough votes to cross the electoral threshold.

==== Parliamentarian ====
The DSS contested the 2016 parliamentary election in an alliance with Dveri. Ristić received the fourth position on their combined list and was elected when the list won thirteen mandates. The Serbian Progressive Party (SNS) and its allies won the election, and Ristić served as an opposition member in the term that followed.

Ristić resigned from the DSS in October 2016 against the backdrop of a serious split in the party. He condemned the decision to expel former leader Sanda Rašković Ivić from the party and accused the DSS's new leadership led by Miloš Jovanović of accommodating itself to the Progressive Party's rule. After leaving the DSS, Ristić became a member of the New Serbia–Movement for Serbia's Salvation parliamentary group under Rašković Ivić's leadership. He supported Dveri leader Boško Obradović in the 2017 Serbian presidential election.

Ristić became an extremely vocal critic of Aleksandar Vučić in his first parliamentary term, accusing the SNS of using a criminal network to intimidate its critics in the Serb communities of northern Kosovo. In a 2017 interview with Vreme, he blamed organized crime for shots that were fired on his family home on election night in 2016 (no-one was injured in the attack). In the same interview, he argued that Serbia should continue to fight for its sovereignty in Kosovo and was quoted as saying, "I do not advocate the division of Kosovo in a geographical sense, but an institutional division should be considered" to ensure Serbs in the territory would have the same right as Albanians to choose their political destiny.

Ristić became a member of the Otadžbina movement (an organization representing Kosovo Serbs who oppose co-operation with the institutions of the Republic of Kosovo) on its formation in 2017. In February 2018, he was chosen as the movement's leader. In this capacity, he was a vocal critic of the Serb List's participation in the Republic of Kosovo government.

Ristić wrote a letter to Russian president Vladimir Putin in 2018 alleging that the Serbian government was planning to sign a comprehensive agreement with the Priština authorities. Among other things, Ristić accused Aleksandar Vučić of co-operating with Priština because of a "promise to the West." The letter included the statement, "The tragic fate of late Serbian Prime Minister Zoran Đinđić [who was assassinated in 2003] is a clear warning to [Vučić] about what happens to those who do not fulfill such a promise." This statement prompted disparate reactions. The Progressive Party accused Ristić of threatening Vučić, while Ristić's supporters decried this charge as tabloid sensationalism and a diversionary tactic.

During his first assembly term, Ristić was a member of the committee on Kosovo and Metohija, a deputy member of the economy committee, (Note: Formally known as the Committee on the Economy, Regional Development, Trade, Tourism, and Energy.) and a member of the parliamentary friendship groups with China and Russia. Like several other opposition parties, the Otadžbina movement adopted a policy of non-participation with Serbian governmental institutions in early 2019 on the grounds that Vučić and the SNS were undermining democracy in Serbia. The movement later boycotted the 2020 Serbian parliamentary election. Ristić's first term assembly ended on 3 August 2020.

The opposition ended its election boycott in 2022, and in February of that year Ristić announced that Otadžbina would support presidential candidate Zdravko Ponoš and the United for the Victory of Serbia coalition in the 2022 Serbian general election. Ristić was himself included in the twenty-sixth position on the coalition's electoral list, with an endorsement from the centre-left Party of Freedom and Justice (SSP), and was elected to a second term when the list won thirty-eight mandates. During his second assembly term, he served in a parliamentary group led by SSP vice-president Marinika Tepić. He again served as a member of the committee on Kosovo and Metohija and was a deputy member of the administrative committee. (Note: Formally known as the Committee on Administrative, Budgetary, Mandate, and Immunity Issues.)

In August 2022, Ristić said that many Serb families in Kosovo were leaving the area due to increased threats from the Priština authorities and accused the Serbian government of contributing to the problem by its inaction. In July 2023, he accused Republic of Kosovo prime minister Albin Kurti of seeking to expel Kosovo's Serbs via intimidation, adding that the Belgrade authorities had no effective strategy in response.

Otadžbina participated in the 2023 Serbian parliamentary election as part of the Serbia Against Violence (SPN) coalition. Ristić appeared in the ninety-third position on the coalition's list with an endorsement from the SSP and was not re-elected when the list won sixty-five seats.
