= Srboljub Milenković =

Srboljub Milenković (Serbian Cyrillic: Србољуб Миленковић; born 1955) is a Kosovo Serb medical doctor and politician. He has served in the National Assembly of Serbia and the Assembly of Serbia and Montenegro, and has held office in northern Kosovska Mitrovica. During his time as an elected official, Milenković was a member of the Democratic Party (DS).

== Private career ==
Milenković identified as an internist nephrologist in the 2003 Serbian parliamentary election.

== Politician ==
=== Republican and federal legislatures ===
Milenković appeared in the eighty-fourth position on the DS's electoral list in the 2003 Serbian election. The list won thirty-seven seats, and he was included afterward in his party's assembly delegation. (From 2000 to 2011, all assembly mandates were awarded to candidates on successful lists at the discretion of the sponsoring parties, irrespective of numerical order. Milenković's list position had no particular bearing on his chances of election.)

Milenković's term in the national assembly was brief. By virtue of its performance in the 2003 election, the Democratic Party had the right to appoint thirteen members to the federal assembly of Serbia and Montenegro. Milenković was included in his party's delegation and so was required to resign from the Serbian parliament. He served in the federal parliament until its dissolution in 2006, when Montenegro declared independence.

=== Kosovo politics ===
Milenković encouraged Kosovo Serbs to participate in the 2004 Kosovan parliamentary election, notwithstanding that others in the community were encouraging a boycott. He was quoted as saying, "If they don't go to vote, Serbs won't be able to build their future."

In 2002, the United Nations Interim Administration Mission in Kosovo (UNMIK) dissolved the local administration in the predominantly Serb northern half of Kosovska Mitrovica and appointed an advisory council. Serb representatives from different parties were appointed to the council; Milenković was appointed as the Democratic Party's representative. In early 2006, he became leader of the council, a position that was roughly equivalent to mayor. He was also recognized by the Serbian government as municipal coordinator for Kosovska Mitrovica. Prior to the release of the Ahtisaari Plan in early 2007, Milenković encouraged co-operation between Kosovo's Serb and Albanian communities and dismissed suggestions that the Serbian government would call on Serbs living in southern Kosovo enclaves to flee their homes if Kosovo declared independence.

The Serbian government removed Milenković as coordinator for Kosovska Mitrovica in December 2007, although he continued to lead the UNMIK advisory council into 2008. Like the majority of Kosovo Serbs, he opposed Kosovo's unilateral declaration of independence in 2008 and the subsequent deployment of a European Union mission to the disputed territory.

He does not appear to have been politically active after 2008.
