= 2012 North Kosovo referendum =

2012 non-binding referendum in North Kosovo to accept Kosovar government institutions

- 14–15 February 2012
- Do you accept the institutions of the so-called Republic of Kosovo?
- Outcome: The governments of Serbia and Kosovo reject the poll. On 1 March, the accession of Serbia to the European Union was given "candidate status" on the premise of progress over the Kosovo dispute (as well as other "reforms").

Results
| Choice | Votes | % |
|---|---|---|
| Yes | 69 | 0.26% |
| No | 26,524 | 99.74% |
| Valid votes | 26,593 | 99.51% |
| Invalid or blank votes | 132 | 0.49% |
| Total votes | 26,725 | 100.00% |
| Registered voters/turnout | 35,500 | 75.28% |

An advisory referendum on accepting the institutions of the Republic of Kosovo was held in the Serb-dominated regions of North Kosovo on 14 and 15 February 2012. The referendum was held in Zubin Potok, Zvečan and Mitrovica on both days, while Leposavić voted on 15 February. The voting ran from 7:00 to 19:00 on both days. The result saw 99.74% of voters reject the writ of the Republic of Kosovo's institutions. The poll was rejected by the governments of both Serbia and Kosovo.

== Background ==
Though North Kosovo, as part of the Assembly of the Community of Municipalities of the Autonomous Province of Kosovo and Metohija, adheres to the United Nations Security Council Resolution 1244, it opposed the unilateral 2008 Kosovo declaration of independence (the Kosovo Serb enclaves were under the de facto jurisdiction of the institutions of the Republic of Serbia, though this is disputed by the Kosovan Assembly). The referendum was announced on December 25, 2011, by Kosovska Mitrovica Mayor Krstimir Pantić, to ascertain local opinion about the writ of the Republic of Kosovo's institutions.

Both the European Union and Serbia were against the referendum. Kosovan Serbs feared that Serbia opposed the referendum in order to win support for accession to the EU, a condition of which is to resolve the Kosovo dispute. The notion was however rejected by Serbian President Boris Tadić and the Minister of State for Kosovo Oliver Ivanović. The parliament of Kosovo passed a motion declaring the referendum invalid.

Similarly, the Foreign Ministry of Albania expressed concern about holding a referendum, stating it was not legal and would not serve the interest of ethnic communities to socially, economically and politically integrate within Kosovo.

Milan Ivanović, the president of the Serbian National Council of Kosovo and Metohija, criticised Serbia proper for having failed in its Kosovo policy while sticking by the decision to democratically demonstrate the view of the Serbs of north Kosovo.

=== North Kosovo barricades ===
The Republic of Kosovo sought to impose its customs officials in the administrative border crossings with Serbia. Kosovar Serbs, seeking the removal of Republic of Kosovo customs officials, sought to erect roadblocks to make travel difficult for KFOR troops in the area that sought to maintain civil order.

== Question ==
Do you accept the institutions of the so-called Republic of Kosovo?
Serbian: Да ли прихватате институције такозване Републике Косово? (Da li prihvatate institucije takozvane Republike Kosovo?)

== Election ==
The referendum was held in four municipalities with a Serbian majority in the north of Kosovo, with 35,500 eligible voters. Some of the voting papers were also in the Albanian language.

There were 82 voting stations: 13 in Kosovska Mitrovica, 11 in Zvečan, 25 in Zubin Potok, and 33 in Leposavić.

According to Ljuba Radović, referendum commission's spokesman, there currently was no information on whether ethnic Albanians will take part in the referendum, though three villages (Žaža, Boljetin and Lipa) in the Zvečan municipality, which are of a Kosovar Albanian majority, have said that they will not take part.

=== Results ===
North Kosovo referendum, 2012
| Choice | Votes | % |
|---|---|---|
| For | 69 | 0.26 |
| Against | 26,524 | 99.74 |
| Total | 26,593 | 100.00 |
| Valid votes | 26,593 | 99.50 |
| Invalid/blank votes | 134 | 0.50 |
| Total votes | 26,727 | 100.00 |
| Registered voters/turnout | | 75 |

== Aftermath ==
On 1 March, the accession of Serbia to the European Union was given "candidate status" on the premise of progress over the Kosovo dispute (as well as other "reforms").

== See also ==
- Partition of Kosovo
- 2013 Brussels Agreement
