= Krstimir Pantić =

Serbian politician

- Крстимир Пантић

Member of the National Assembly of Serbia
- In office 2014–2016

Mayor of North Mitrovica
- In office 2010–2013
- Succeeded by: Goran Rakić

Personal details
- Born: 1972 (age 53–54) Kosovska Mitrovica, SR Serbia, SFR Yugoslavia (now Kosovo)
- Party: Serbian Progressive Party
- Education: University of Prishtina
- Occupation: Politician

Krstimir Pantić (Serbian Cyrillic: Крстимир Пантић; born 1972) is a Kosovo Serb politician. He served as mayor of northern Kosovska Mitrovica from 2010 to 2013. He was re-elected to the position following the 2013 Brussels Agreement but refused to take the formal oath of office as the document was in the name of the Republic of Kosovo, which Serbia does not recognize. He subsequently served in the National Assembly of Serbia from 2014 to 2016 as a member of the Serbian Progressive Party.

== Early life and private career ==
Pantić was born in Kosovska Mitrovica, in what was then the Socialist Autonomous Province of Kosovo in the Socialist Republic of Serbia, Socialist Federal Republic of Yugoslavia. He is a graduate of the University of Priština Faculty of Technology and Metallurgy.

== Politician ==
=== Mayor of northern Kosovska Mitrovica ===
Following the 1999 Kosovo War, Kosovska Mitrovica became divided between the predominantly Serb north and the predominantly Albanian south. Pantić became mayor of northern Kosovska Mitrovica in 2010, when the Progressive Party and the Democratic Party of Serbia formed a new local administration. At this time, the administration of northern Kosovska Mitrovica was not recognized by the government of Kosovo. Like most Kosovo Serb politicians, Pantić considers Kosovo to be a part of Serbia and does not recognize Kosovo's 2008 declaration of independence.

In July 2011, Kosovo Police crossed into the predominantly Serb areas of northern Kosovo in an attempt to gain control of the border crossings between Kosovo and Central Serbia, without consulting Serbia or the international forces of KFOR/EULEX. This action, ultimately unsuccessful, was met with strong opposition from the local Serb community, which established roadblocks in the area. These events became known as the North Kosovo crisis. Pantić was among the Kosovo Serb mayors who organized and supported the roadblock protest. In late 2011, he rejected an appeal from Serbian president Boris Tadić to remove the barricades. He also rejected suggestions that the Serb municipalities of North Kosovo had mandated citizens to remain at the barricades, saying that all citizens at the barricades were participating voluntarily.

Against the backdrop of this crisis, Pantić called for representatives of the Serb communities to North Kosovo be included in ongoing negotiations between the governments of Serbia and Kosovo in Brussels. In early 2012, he played a leading role in organizing a referendum for Serbs in North Kosovo on whether or not to accept the institutions of Republic of Kosovo. The result was 99.74% opposed. In March 2012, Pantić indicated that he had forwarded the result to United Nations secretary-general Ban Ki-moon. The referendum was not sanctioned by the government of Serbia and was not recognized by the governments of either Serbia or Kosovo.

Pantić was appointed as a deputy director of Serbia's Office for Kosovo and Metohija following its creation in 2012. In this capacity, he took part in the discussions that led to the 2013 Brussels Agreement, which normalized some relations between the governments of Serbia and Kosovo without resolving the status of the territory. He rejected accusations from the rival Democratic Party of Serbia that he was in a conflict-of-interest situation by virtue of serving as both mayor and deputy director.

=== 2013 mayoral election ===
The government of Serbia dissolved the municipal assembly of northern Kosovska Mitrovica in September 2013 and appointed Pantić as the leader of a provisional administration pending new municipal elections.

Pantić sought re-election as mayor in the 2013 Kosovan local elections as the candidate of the Civic Initiative "Srpska". He urged Serbs to participate in the election and to reject calls by some in the community for a boycott, arguing that a successful vote would strengthen the status of Kosovo Serb institutions internationally and would lead to the creation of the Community of Serb Municipalities in Kosovo. During the election, he was physically attacked in front of his home by unidentified parties; he has said that he believed the attackers wanted to kill him. Pantić was elected in the second round of voting, defeating rival candidate Oliver Ivanović.

Pantić refused to take the oath of office as mayor in January 2014 because the emblem of Kosovo and the inscription "Kosovo Republika" appeared on the government paper that included the oath. In announcing this decision, he also resigned as deputy director of the Office for Kosovo and Metohija, citing obstructions to creating to the Community of Serb Municipalities and accusing the Organization for Security and Co-operation in Europe (OSCE), which organized the municipal elections, of violating its neutrality by recognizing Kosovo as independent. He subsequently accused Aleksandar Vulin, the Serbian minister responsible for Kosovo and Metohija, of undermining Serbia's interests in Kosovo in order to advance those of his political party.

In a 2016 interview, he said that he regretted not taking the oath of office.

=== Member of the National Assembly ===
Pantić received the 160th position on the Progressive Party's Aleksandar Vučić — Future We Believe In electoral list for the national assembly in the 2014 Serbian parliamentary election. He narrowly missed direct election when the list won a landslide victory with 158 mandates and was able to enter the assembly on 26 August 2014 as the replacement for another party member.

In 2015, Pantić and fellow parliamentarian Marijan Rističević put forward a draft resolution to condemn all crimes committed in and around Srebrenica during the Bosnian War and to further condemn what were described the misuse of war crimes for propaganda purposes and selective justice in prosecuting the perpetrators of these crimes. This resolution, which was not passed by the Serbian parliament, was a response to calls for a motion specifically condemning the crimes committed by Serb forces in the Srebrenica massacre.

Pantić received the 151st position on the Progressive list in the 2016 parliamentary election. The list won 131 mandates; he was not returned and did not serve in the parliament that followed.

== Electoral record ==
=== Municipal ===
2013 northern Kosovska Mitrovica mayoral election
Krstimir Pantić	Civic Initiative "Srpska"	2,173	36.89	2,293	54.38
Oliver Ivanović	Civic Initiative "SDP - Oliver Ivanović"	1,670	28.35	1,924	45.62
Agim Deva	Democratic Party of Kosovo	1,190	20.20		
Adrijana Hodžić	Independent	727	12.34		
Dimitrije Janićijević	Independent Liberal Party	130	2.21		
Total valid votes		5,890	100	4,217	100
