= Jarinje =

Jarinje: Jarinjë or Jarinja (Albanian) Jarinje or Јариње (Serbian)
- Village
- Location within Kosovo
- Coordinates: 43°12′27″N 20°43′0″E
- Location: Kosovo
- District: Mitrovica
- Municipality: Leposaviq

Population (2024)
  - Total: 30

Jarinje (Serbian Cyrillic: Јариње, pronounced [jǎriːɲɛ]) or Jarinjë (Albanian definite form: Jarinja), is a village in northern Kosovo. A border crossing with Serbia is located in the village.

== Border crossing ==
Jarinje was the location of one of the NATO-staffed border checkpoints between Serbia and Kosovo. In February 2008, the border was sealed by NATO troops after ethnic Serbs ransacked and set fire to the border checkpoints at Jarinje and Brnjak, in an angry reaction to the independence declaration of Kosovo. The area saw further clashes in July 2011, and in 2021 and 2022. Serbia has appointed guards and customs agents to work at the border. The 2013 Brussels Agreement made them permanent. As such, the area has been marred with the reputation of being the site of constant protests and blockades.
