= North Kosovo crisis (2011–2013) =

2011–2013 crisis in Northern Kosovo

2011–2013 North Kosovo crisis
- Part of the Kosovo dispute
- Serb blockade of a road in North Kosovo
- Date: 25 July 2011 – 19 April 2013
- Location: North Kosovo
- Caused by: Republic of Kosovo's imposition of sovereignty on the whole territory of Kosovo according to Constitution of Kosovo; acquiring administrative stations located in North Kosovo.; Local Serbs' prevention of the imposition of Republic of Kosovo-enacted decrees within North Kosovo.
- Methods: Protests, road block protests, barricade, civil disobedience
- Result: North Kosovo referendum; Brussels Agreement

Parties
| Kosovo Serbs Supported by:Serbia | Kosovo: Kosovo Police; Kosovo Security Force | NATO: Kosovo Force |

Lead figures
| No official leadership | (Kosovo) Hashim Thaçi (Kosovo) Atifete Jahjaga (Kosovo) Bajram Rexhepi | Erhard Bühler; Erhard Drews; Volker Halbauer |

Number
| Thousands of Serb protesters | (Kosovo) More than 200 police | Around 200 KFOR soldiers |

Casualties and losses
| 3 Serbs killed and 162 others non-fatally injured | (Kosovo) 1 Kosovan policeman killed and 7 others non-fatally injured | 65 KFOR soldiers non-fatally injured |

Clashes between the Republic of Kosovo and ethnic Serbs in northern Kosovo began on 25 July 2011 when the Kosovo Police crossed into the Serb-controlled municipalities of North Kosovo, to control several administrative border crossings. This was done without the Kosovo Police consulting either Serbia or Kosovo Force (KFOR)/EULEX (European Union Rule of Law Mission in Kosovo). Though tensions between the two sides eased somewhat after the intervention of NATO's KFOR forces, they remained high amid concern from the European Union, which also blamed Kosovo for the unilateral provocation. On 19 April 2013, an agreement was signed in Brussels between representatives of Kosovo and Serbia. The 15-point document granted devolved powers to North Kosovo regarding economic development, education, healthcare and urban planning, and several mechanisms that allowed a certain autonomy in justice, policing and electoral matters.

== Background ==
=== Kosovo–Serbia administrative border crossings ===
The clashes occurred because of a long stand-off over cross-border trade. Since the declaration of independence, Kosovo has been unable to export anything to or through territories controlled directly by Serbia's government. There was disruption to cross-border trade following Serbia's ban on Kosovar imports, even though many jobs on both sides depended on cross-border trade Serbia stationed troops in the northern region to enforce a boycott of goods from Kosovo proper.

Although KFOR had implemented the "vague ultimatums" to remove the barricades, Kosovar Serbs had used mountainous tracts to cross between northern Kosovo and Serbia proper in the past. At the same as the bridge dividing Mitrovica was closed from transport to the south, the daily train to southern Serbia was packed. The European Union (EU) demanded Serbia dismantle "the parallel structures" of government in Northern Kosovo. Serbia's secretary of state for Kosovo, Oliver Ivanović, said: "We don't see these as 'parallel structures', we see these as the only structures, because we do not recognise the independence of Kosovo." He also said a partition of Kosovo is out of the question, even though Serbian president Boris Tadić said he was open to the possibility. The Serbs of North Kosovo do not acknowledge or cooperate with the government of Kosovo.

Before the Kosovo Police's attempt to take over the administrative border crossings on 26 July, EULEX and Serb members of the Kosovo Police controlled them.

== Goals ==
North Kosovo, as part of the Assembly of the Community of Municipalities of Kosovo, observed United Nations Security Council Resolution 1244 and defied the 2008 Kosovo declaration of independence (the Kosovo Serb enclaves had been under local control, disputed by the Kosovar Albanian Assembly) until the 2013 Brussels Agreement. The government of the Republic of Kosovo sought to install customs officials at the administrative border crossings with Central Serbia. Because Kosovar Serbs opposed the presence of Kosovar Albanians at the crossings, they erected roadblocks to make movement difficult for KFOR personnel.

== Timeline ==
=== July–August 2011 ===
On 26 July 2011, during the operation to take control of the administrative border posts, a Serb sniper killed Enver Zymberi, a member of the Kosovo Police Special Intervention Unit. Twenty-five more policemen were wounded, with at least one being treated in hospital for severe wounds. The KFOR Mi-17 helicopter that had moved the 16 Kosovo special police personnel belonged to the Croatian Army. Later that day, the same helicopter had been fired at. An hour later, 14 new Kosovo police officers and three customs officers were located in Brnjak. Though the Kosovo police later withdrew and there was a lull in tensions, some Serbian protesters returned in the evening and attacked the post.

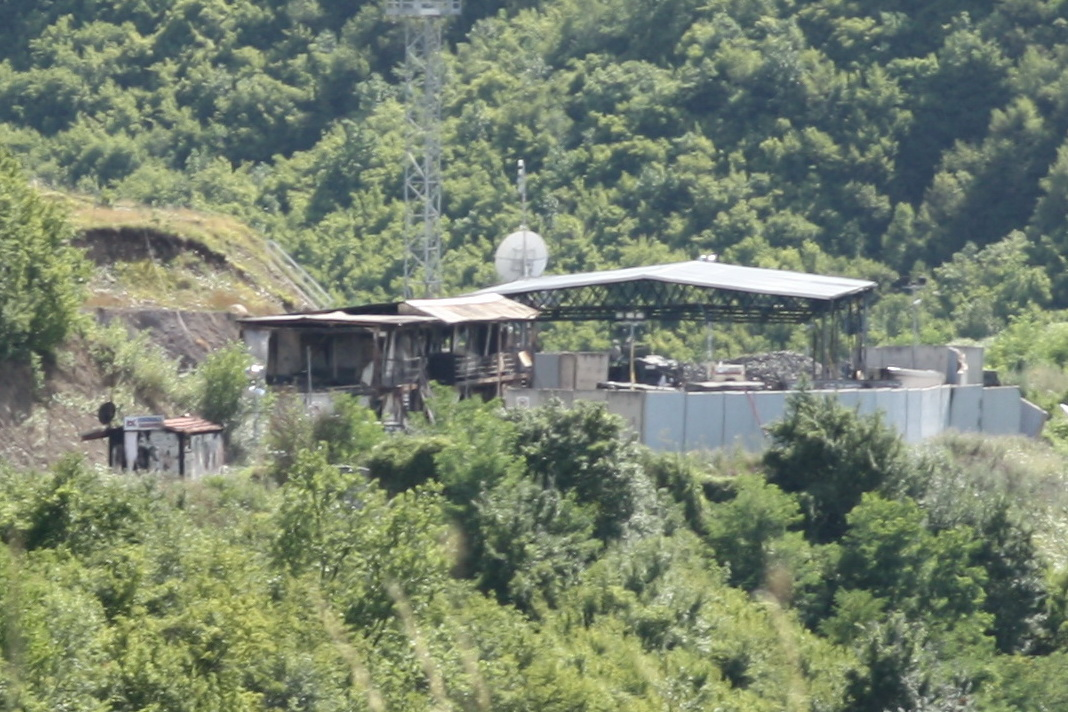
Jarinje administrative border crossing, burnt down on 27 July 2011

Clashes continued on 27 July after armed Kosovar police took over two administrative border posts to enforce the writ of the central government in Pristina; ethnic Serbs burned down the administrative border post at Jarinje. The mob, which reportedly included "dozens of masked men, armed with crowbars, clubs, axes, Molotov cocktails and handheld flares," as well as rocks and other debris, were said to have attacked the NATO troops who were a part of KFOR operations. Reports also suggested the troops may have been fired upon with guns. This was the same administrative border post that had been burned down in 2008 after Kosovo's unilateral declaration of independence. Following the intervention of KFOR's NATO troops, a NATO operations officer, Lieutenant Colonel Ralf Adametz, said "the situation is now under control, but tense".

There was a thaw in tensions on 28 July, after all Kosovar units withdrew from North Kosovo, leaving KFOR's NATO troops in charge of maintaining peace in the region. In return, the Serbs removed most of the roadblocks they had created. KFOR took full control of the two crossings and General Erhard Bühler declared the area around the two crossings to be military areas, therefore giving shoot-at-sight orders to his soldiers for anyone crossing the area.

As of 29 July, NATO units remained in control of the two administrative border posts. However, some roadblocks, set up by hundreds of Serb protesters, prevented them from returning to their bases. The column of American and Slovenian 30 armoured vehicles then withdrew from the barricade, even though they were given permission to move against the protesters using force, if necessary. The decision was made to avoid further bloodshed.

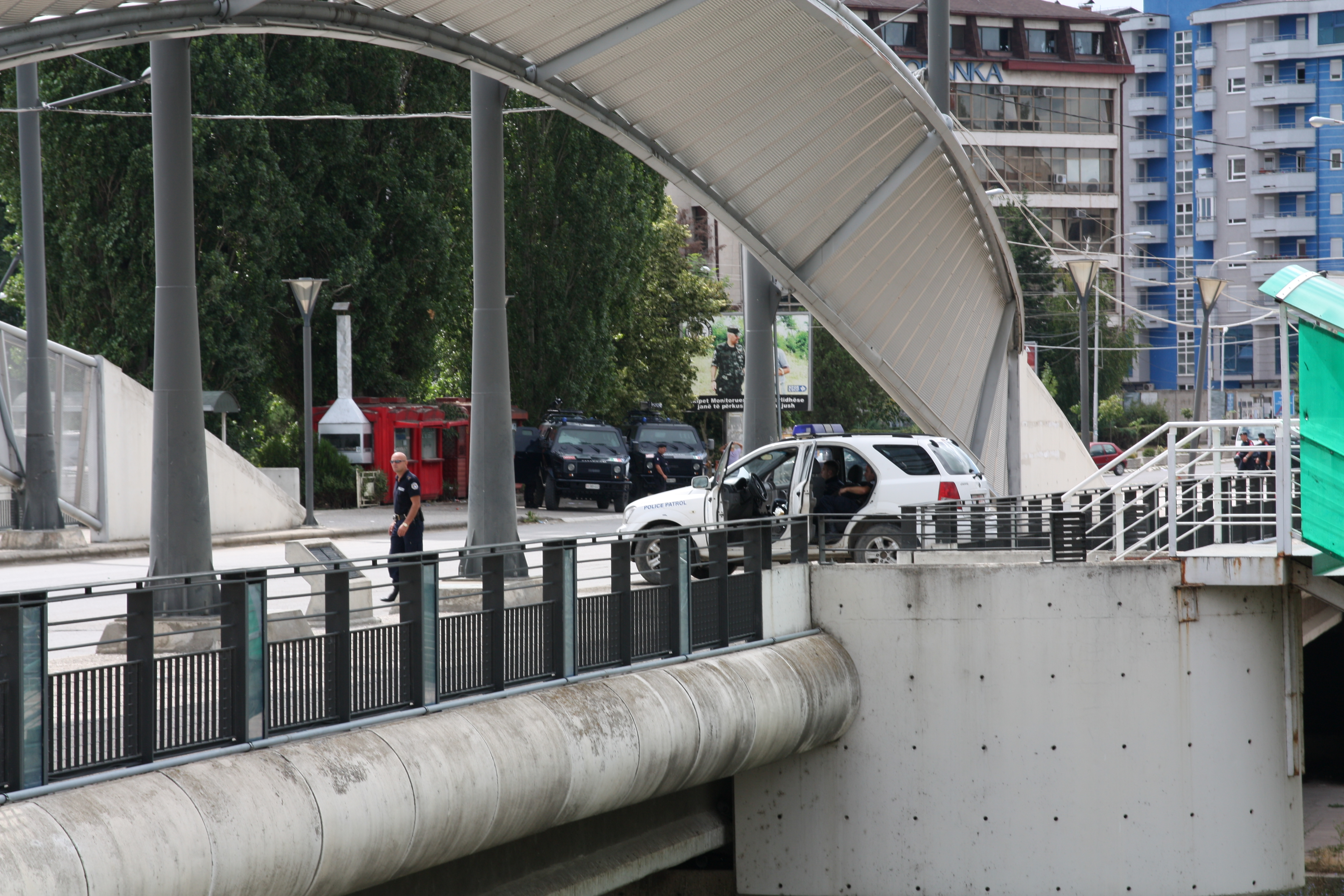
Kosovo Police and Italian Carabinieri from KFOR-MSU near the Ibar River Bridge on the Kosovo Albanian side.

On 31 July, the Serbs continued to man their roadblocks and KFOR soldiers remained isolated at the administrative border crossings they were manning. The Kosovars then organised burnings of Serbian products and General Buhler sent an ultimatum to the Serbs blocking the road.

On 1 August, NATO said that Swiss Army sappers, supported by other KFOR troops had cleared three of the roadblocks but claimed that there were still at least five remaining on the two roads leading to Serbia. Kosovar interior minister Bajram Rexhepi ordered Serbia's Minister for Kosovo and Metohija, Goran Bogdanović, and the head of the Serbian negotiation team, Borislav Stefanović, to be deported after allegedly having entered Kosovo illegally. The next day, however, some roadblocks remained in place with all major roads being completely sealed off. Agence France Press reported a severe food crisis and a shortage of medicines in the North. KFOR then asked a battalion of 550 German soldiers, assisted by 150 Austrian troops, to reinforce its presence in the north to deal with future unrest.

On 3 August, Kosovar prime minister Hashim Thaçi reiterated a refusal to back down on his trade ban as some roadblocks remained in place across the North. A deal was later struck to allow KFOR to control the administrative border crossings in return for the dismantling of the blockades. KFOR helicopters were then used to bypass the roadblocks and establish a skeletal EULEX and Kosovo Police and Customs presence at the administrative border crossings.

=== September–December ===
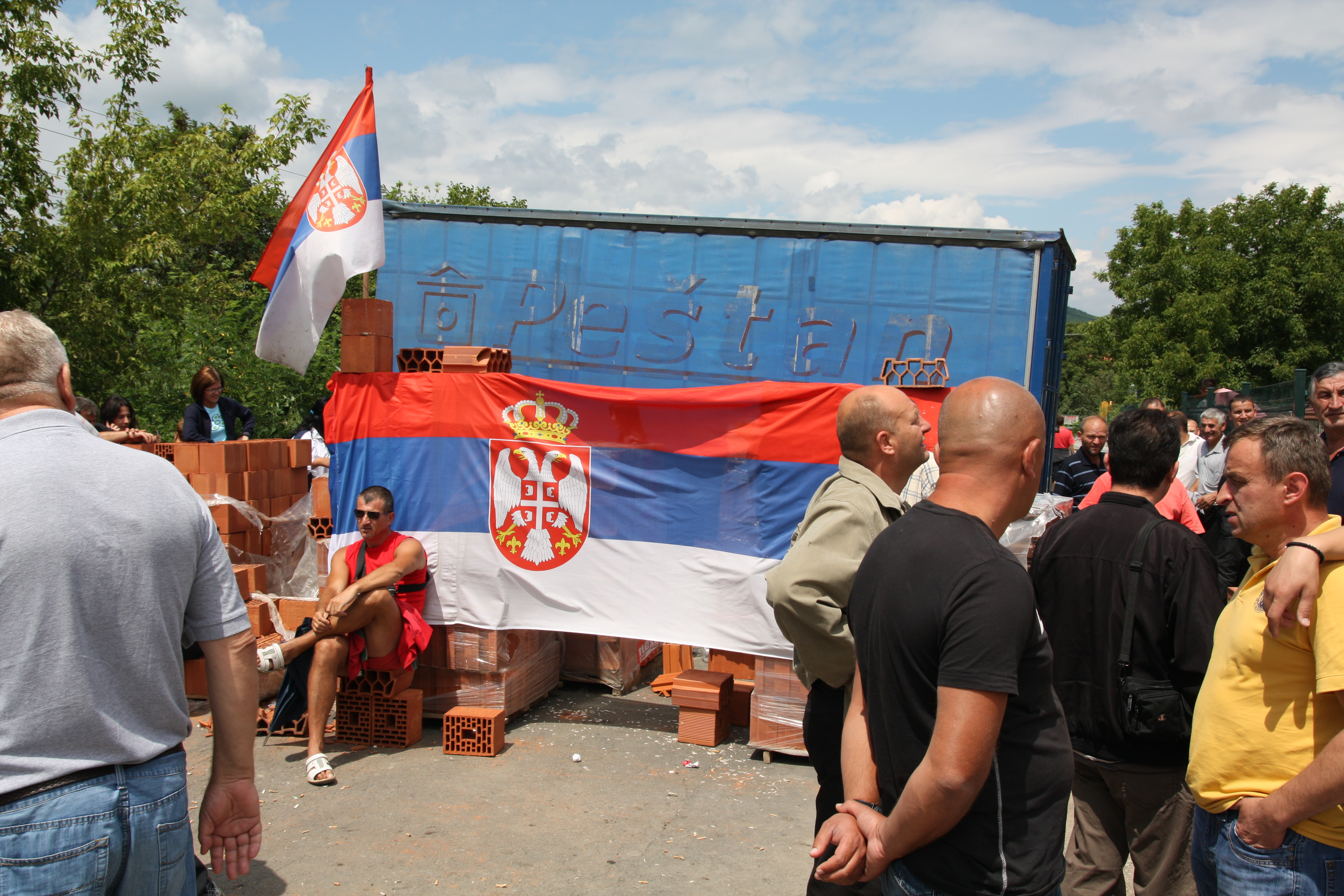
Peaceful protests in Zvečan, 30 July.

Tensions reignited after the Kosovo Police, EULEX and NATO units airlifted troops from Kosovo-proper to the two administrative border posts to re-establish control over the North on 16 September. Local Serbs blocked all major routes leading to the two administrative border crossings, including two major bridges connecting the divided town of Mitrovica and vowed to remain "until the bitter end". This left the troops at the administrative border crossings virtually isolated from the rest of Kosovo. European media reported that youths from both the Albanian and Serbian communities pelted each other with rocks near one of the blocked bridges KFOR intervened to stop the violence.

The previous night had passed without incident in most of northern Kosovo, except for a minor incident near Zupče and Çabër with shots fired in the area because of an increased police presence in Mitrovica. After the shooting, Kosovar Serbs set-up another barricade next to an existing encampment in Zupče on the road from Mitrovica to Ribarici; gravel was dumped across both lanes of the road leading to the southern part of Mitrovica. The next day there were clashes at the roadblocks after they were reinforced with more Serb protesters and Kosovo Police officers.

KFOR helicopters dropped hundreds of leaflets urging the Serbs to end their roadblocks on 29 September. The five sentence leaflet, written in Serbian Cyrillic, warned citizens that blocking roads was against the law and such a move "is not in line with peaceful demonstrations. Blocking roads represent[s a] danger for all in extraordinary situations, because there is no possibility to deliver help to those in need." Confirming the air drop, KFOR spokesman Ralph Adametz said that the leaflets were dropped at the barricades close to administrative border crossings 1 and 31. He described the overall situation as unchangeable but underlined the need to open blocked roads. KFOR said the mission "recognises the right for peaceful protests and demonstrations" but "blocking roads doesn't represent any accepted way for expressing your concerns". The air drop began hours after the head of EULEX, Xavier de Marnhac, visited the two disputed crossings. According to him, both crossings were technically ready to be fully operational, but the barricades erected on nearby roads prevented the gates from being utilised.

Pipe bomb explosions injured four soldiers on 27 September. NATO spokesman Kai Gudenoge then said that German KFOR troops were forced to fire rubber bullets and tear gas in self-defence against Kosovan Serb protesters after being attacked at administrative border crossing Gate 1 following an attempt by Kosovar Serbs to erect a new roadblock after KFOR blocked an alternative road to Serbia proper. Five protesters were arrested. Hospital officials in northern Kosovo said seven Serb protesters were wounded from gunfire, which erupted in the afternoon in Jarinje. The head of Mitrovica hospital, Milan Jakovljevic, said the wounded had been brought to his hospital for medical treatment, adding: "We can't say if anyone has life threatening injures at this moment, since we are assessing their current extent of the injuries." The Kosovar government in Pristina said it was working with both KFOR and EULEX to open the barricaded roads in the north. The local media in Mitrovica reported that two EULEX vehicles were set on fire.

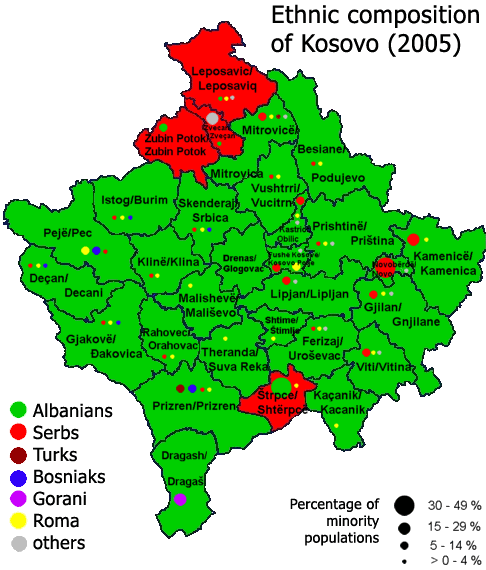
Kosovo's ethnic divisions

KFOR's commander said his troops would remove roadblocks forcibly on 17 October if Kosovar Serbs did not voluntarily do so. KFOR's General Erhard Drews said "KFOR is ready and resolved to take action on behalf of freedom of movement." However, Kosovar Serbs said they would take "defensive action" to counter KFOR's attempts at forcibly removing the roadblocks. Though the deadline passed to remove them, KFOR troops who were sent to remove the roadblocks left without incident to give the local Serbs more time to do it themselves. A KFOR commander said that "we've been given orders to go back, as we cannot go through barricades". Drews said that with the defiance of the ultimatum as "the north did not comply with the request to remove the roadblocks". In response, Kosovar Serb politicians said that any KFOR operations would be halted till 19 October for community leaders to discuss a compromise solution. Slavisa Ristic, mayor of Zubin Potok, said "there will be no KFOR actions today or tomorrow until representatives of (Serb) municipalities agree on how to end the impasse".

On the morning of 20 October, KFOR and EULEX clashed with Kosovar Serbs near Brnjak, resulting in injuries, three serious, to 22 Serbs, including women, and eight KFOR injuries. KFOR then entered North Kosovo after failing to agree on free movement inside four of the Serb municipalities of Kosovo. On the same day in Dobruša, near Pejë, an Albanian perpetrator who later gave himself up to the Kosovo police, killed a Serb and injured two others. A few thousand Serbs held another peaceful protest in Gračanica. At this time, the majority of Serbs south of Ibar, beyond North Kosovo, still depended on Serbia, while only five percent are talking with Kosovan Albanian institutions.

Kosovo police stopped an Albanian from southern Mitrovica from using a bulldozer to destroy a barricade at a bridge on 24 October.

KFOR tried to remove a barricade in the village of Dudin Krš on the night of 23 November. They withdrew about an hour and a half after midnight. Afterwards, an explosion went off at 01:00 CET in northern Mitrovica near the Faculty of Economy, which damaged two cars. 21 KFOR/NATO soldiers were injured slightly, and one of them seriously, the night of 23/24 November.

On 20 December, Serbian police arrested Zvonko and Zarko Veselinović, who had allegedly organised the 27 and 28 September barricades at Jarinje and Jagnjenica, respectively, causing controversy in the Serbian public.

=== North Kosovo referendum ===
In February 2012, four northern Serb-dominated regions held a non-binding referendum to ask if the institutions of Kosovo should be recognised. The result saw 99.74% of voters reject the Republic of Kosovo.

=== June 2012 ===
Shortly after Serbia's new president, Tomislav Nikolić, took office on 1 June in Zvečan, KFOR German troops blocked a bridge with armoured vehicles and barbed wire in an attempt to remove a roadblock, causing a confrontation with several hundred protesters who threw rocks at them. The soldiers were then reported to have returned fire with rubber bullets and tear gas, which led to a further confrontation with Kosovan Serbs using small arms. Four Serbs and two German soldiers were wounded. Spokesman Colonel Uwe Nowitzky reported there was sniper fire aimed at German forces, and that the soldiers retaliated by firing live ammunition on at least one "sniper pit" which was consequently "deactivated". Nowitzky added: "KFOR condemns this act of violence. KFOR will not allow the situation to escalate and will use a proportional level of force necessary to maintain a safe and secure environment." KFOR said it would continue to seek the removal of roadblocks, while Kosovan Serbs vowed those affiliated with the government in Pristina would be unable to impose their writ on the north. Zvečan's mayor, Dragiša Milović, said that KFOR refused to allow Serb medical personnel to assist the wounded Serbs. "A commander told me they have the authority to use deadly force on anyone who throws a stone or uses a weapon."

== Response ==
=== Kosovo ===
Prime Minister Hashim Thaçi said the initial police operation was a "concrete step in establishing the rule of law [in North Kosovo]". He added that through co-operation with the "international community...the constitution and the sovereignty of my country are sacred for myself and for my countrymen and go beyond any partnership or loyalty".

On 3 August, the government of Kosovo stated it would not accept a KFOR-Serbia deal, which included moving road blocks in northern Kosovo. The next day Foreign Minister Enver Hoxhaj accused Serbia of seeking to exploit the increased tensions to pursue what he called Serbia's "long-held dream of partitioning the region".

=== Serbia ===
During the first phase of clashes, Serbia asked Lebanon and Germany to hold an emergency meeting at the UN. Russia and China supported the Serbian request; however, the United States and the United Kingdom were opposed to the move, as they wanted the Kosovo issue to be discussed at the UN the following month. The UN approved the Serbian request and the UN emergency meeting was to be held on 28 July, behind closed doors. President Boris Tadić's office also condemned the violence: "The hooligans who are sparking violence are not defending either the people or the Serb state. The people must refrain from violence."

After the first phase of clashes, the State Secretary for Kosovo, Oliver Ivanović, said that "one act of violence produces more violence. I am afraid we are entering a spiral of violence". Reuters quoted Borko Stefanović, the chief negotiator of a Serbian team trying to find a solution to the violence, as saying that: "This violent act, an act of criminals and extremists, represents a clear attempt to undermine the process we are pursuing and the attempts to resolve all the issues in a peaceful manner. This greatly aggravates the position of Serbs in the north of Kosovo and Metohija and is not contributing to the resolution of the problems which had brought us here in the past couple of days."

Goran Bogdanović, the Serbian Minister of Kosovo and Metohija, said that Kosovan Serb officials and KFOR needed to reach an agreement and asked for KFOR and the Kosovan Serbs to stop the violence as the initiation of talks on 19 October showed Serb willingness for a peaceful solution. Vuk Jeremić also said that KFOR needed to stop instigating violence and stressed that the UNSC Resolution 1244 should be respected as it sought a peaceful solution.

=== KFOR-EULEX ===
On 29 September, Erhard Drews took over command of KFOR.

On 19 October, talks between KFOR and Kosovar Serb officials began. KFOR presented an ultimatum for free movement inside North Kosovo by KFOR and EULEX vehicles. KFOR's presence was accepted, however, an EULEX presence was rejected. KFOR officials insisted that EULEX also had to be given entry. As a result, the talks remained deadlocked. KFOR Lieutenant Colonel Ralf Adamec said that KFOR had no plans to use force to remove the barricades, but that it had the right to use force. Goran Bogdanović said the Kosovar Serb officials and KFOR needed to reach an agreement and asked for KFOR and the Kosovan Serbs to stop the violence. The Serbian Minister of Foreign Affairs Vuk Jeremić added that KFOR needed to stop its cycle of violence and stressed that UN Resolution 1244 needed to be respected as it sought a peaceful solution.

=== Supranational bodies ===
- The EU's High Representative for Foreign Affairs and Security Policy Catherine Ashton issued a statement after the initial clashes that read: "I strongly condemn the violence that has taken place in northern Kosovo. These latest developments are unacceptable." She also added it was the "responsibility" of the Serbian and Kosovar government to restore peace between the two "nations". Her deputy spokesperson, Maja Kocijančič, said that Kosovo's unilateral decision to take over the administrative border posts was "not helpful. It was not done in consultation neither with the European Union nor the international community and we do not approve [of] it." (sic)
- At the same time, a NATO statement read: "The situation deteriorated at the customs post Jarinje and it was confirmed that an act of arson was committed against that position. There have also been confirmed reports of shots fired at KFOR personnel in the vicinity."

=== Other countries ===
- Macedonia - Ali Ahmeti, the leader of Democratic Union for Integration (the largest Albanian party in Macedonia), said after the initial clashes that if the North of Kosovo was given to Serbia, then he would no longer be Macedonia's self-declared "guardian of peace". He added Albanians would have to organise themselves as they had done in 2001.
- France - Following the 2012 incidents, a Foreign Ministry spokesman said it was "unacceptable" that the KFOR troops were fired upon and this showed a need for Kosovo and Serbia to work together to implement their agreements.
- United States - President Barack Obama agreed with Kocijančič, but did not condemn Kosovo.

=== Other sub-national divisions ===
- Republika Srpska - President Milorad Dodik of the Republika Srpska supported partition of Kosovo between Serbia and Kosovo, and also supported partition of Bosnia and Herzegovina into three mini-states: Serbian, Bosnian and Croatian.

== See also ==
- Kosovo–Serbia relations
- 2008 unrest in Kosovo
- 2012 North Kosovo referendum
- 2021 North Kosovo crisis
- Crisis situations and unrest in Europe since 2000
