= 2025 Kosovan local elections =

- 12 October 2025 (first round); 9 November 2025 (second round)

All 38 Municipalities of Kosovo
- Turnout: 48.12% (first round); 32.82% (second round)
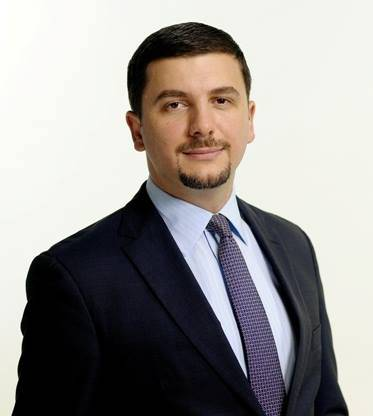

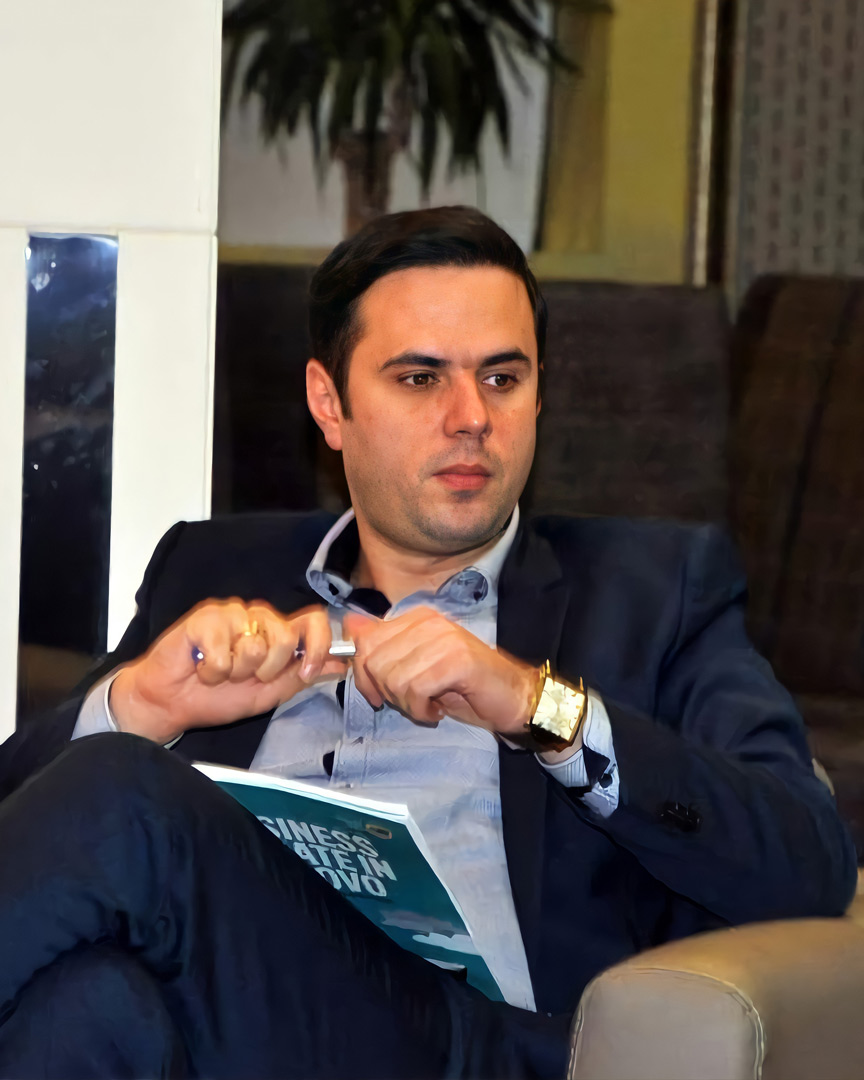

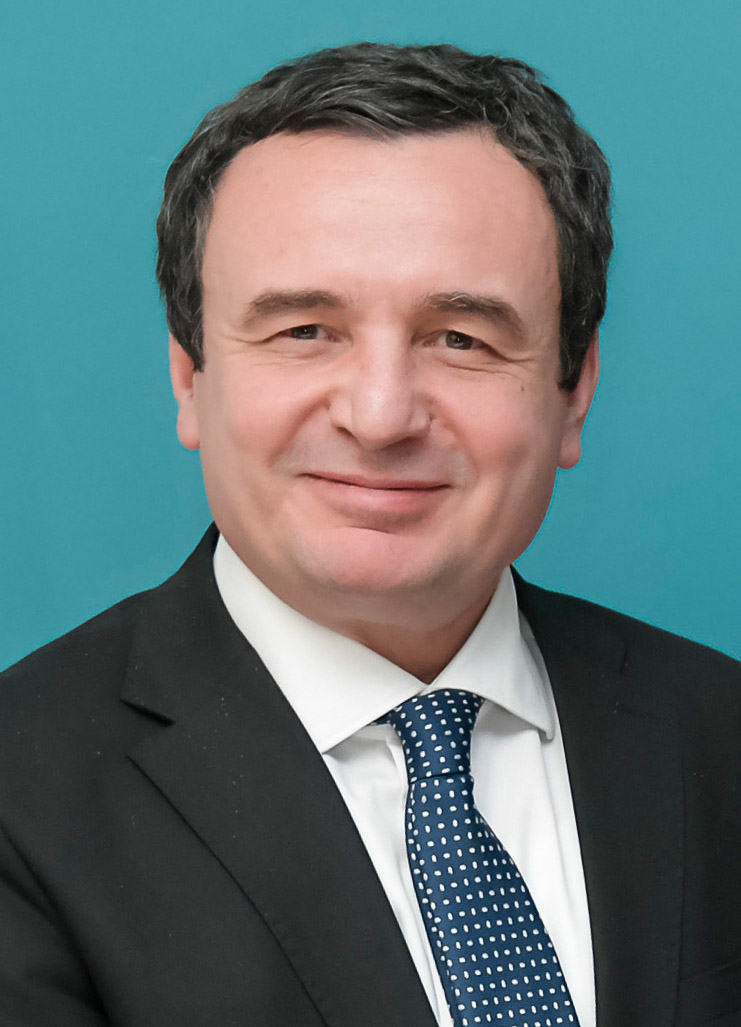

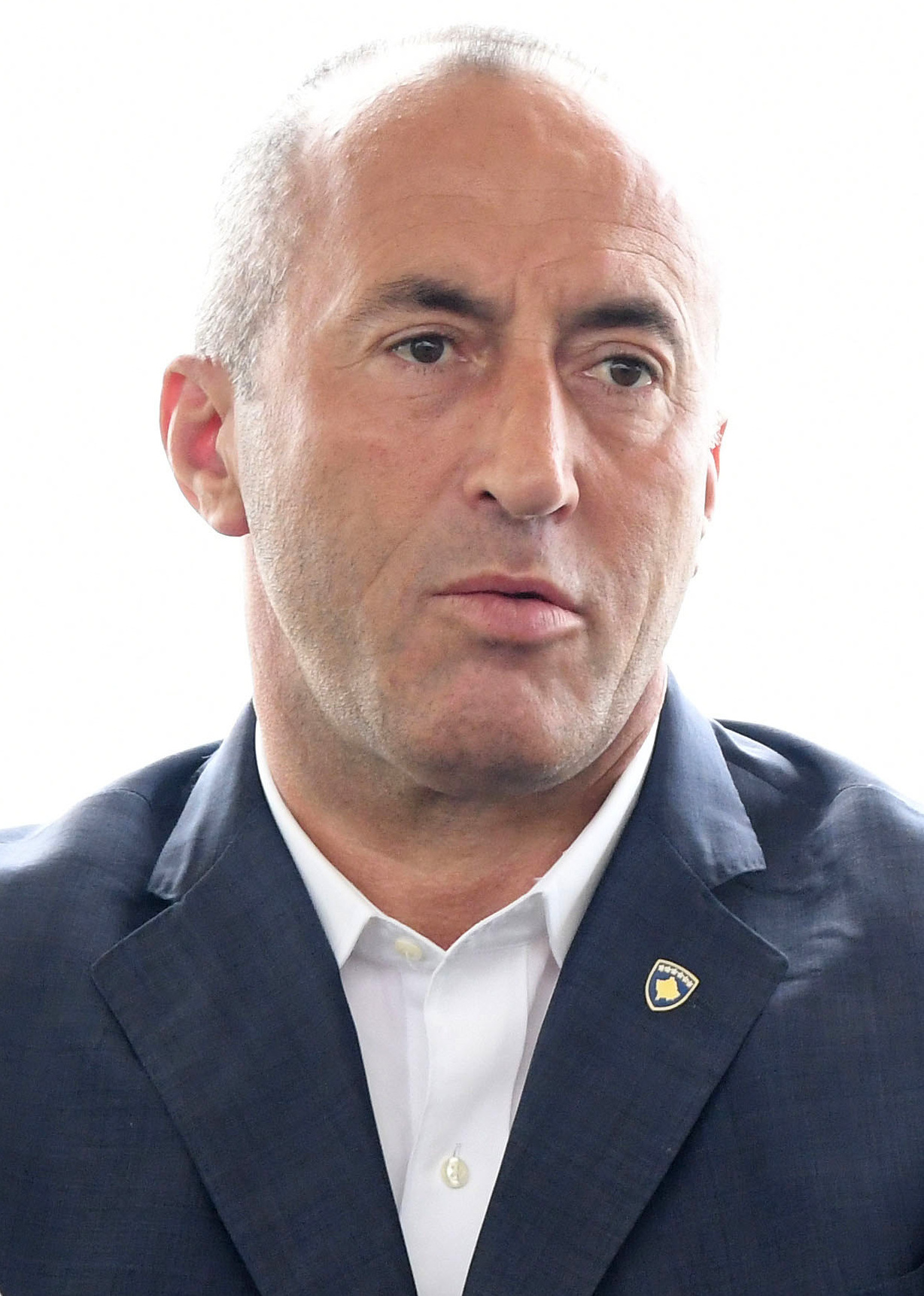

| Leader | Memli Krasniqi | Lumir Abdixhiku | Albin Kurti |
| Party | PDK | LDK | LVV |
| Last election | 9 municipalities, 21.78% | 8 municipalities, 22.93% | 4 municipalities, 22.65% |
| Municipalities | 6 | 7 | 7 |
| Change | ▼3 | ▼1 | ▲3 |
| Popular vote | 187,524 | 183,218 | 168,573 |
| Percentage | 24.84% | 24.27% | 22.33% |
| Swing | ▲3.06% | ▲1.34% | ▼0.32% |
| Municipal councils | 208 | 203 | 182 |
| Leader | Ramush Haradinaj | Zlatan Elek | Fatmir Limaj |
| Party | AAK | SL | NISMA |
| Last election | 5 municipalities, 12.25% | 6 municipalities, 7.19% | 1 municipality, 2.49% |
| Municipalities | 5 | 10 | 1 |
| Change | 0 | ▲4 | 0 |
| Popular vote | 86,358 | 40,720 | 20,804 |
| Percentage | 11.44% | 5.39% | 2.76% |
| Swing | ▼0.81% | ▼1.8% | ▲0.27% |
| Municipal councils | 98 | 117 | 24 |
- Mayoral results-for party by municipality SL (10) LDK (7) LVV (7) PDK (6); AAK (5) KDTP (1) NISMA (1) Independent (1)

Local elections were held in Kosovo on 12 October 2025. A second round of voting has been held on 9 November 2025 in 21 municipalities where no candidate won a majority (50%) of the votes. On 11 November 2025, the Democratic Party of Kosovo (PDK) has filed a complaint to ECAP (Election Complaints and Appeals Panel) claiming that there was election fraud and manipulation of votes in South Mitrovica after the counting of votes by QKN has been cancelled on 10 November 2025 but resumed the next day after a decision from the Supreme Court to continue it with supervision from the police.

== Electoral system ==
The Mayor and the members of the Assembly will be elected by open list proportional representation, with seats reserved for national minorities, in each Kosovo municipalities. Based on Article 36, paragraph 1, of Law No. 03/L-040 on Local Self-Government, the number of members in the Municipal Assembly of a municipality must be proportional, depending on the number of citizens in the municipality, except for the Municipal Assembly of Pristina, which, according to paragraph 2, consists of 51 members.

- If the municipality has up to 10,000 citizens, the assembly of that municipality consists of 15 members;
- If the municipality has from 10,001 to 20,000 citizens, the assembly of that municipality consists of 19 members;
- If the municipality has from 20,001 to 30,000 citizens, the assembly of that municipality consists of 21 members;
- If the municipality has from 30,001 to 50,000 citizens, the assembly of that municipality consists of 27 members;
- If the municipality has from 50,001 to 70,000 citizens, the assembly of that municipality consists of 31 members;
- If the municipality has from 70,001 to 100,000 citizens, the assembly of that municipality consists of 35 members;
- If the municipality has more than 100,000 citizens, the assembly of that municipality consists of 41 members.

== Parties and coalitions ==
Kosovo municipalities

Candidate for mayor or municipal assembly
| No. | Party, coalition or individual candidate | No. | Party, coalition or individual candidate |
|---|---|---|---|
| 100 | Aleanca Shqiptare | 146 | Iniciativa Qytetare për Skënderaj |
| 101 | Për Drenasin Kampion me Ramiz Lladrovcin | 147 | Vakat Coalition |
| 102 | Nedžmidin Sejdalar | 148 | Bekim Avdiu |
| 104 | Turkish Democratic Party of Kosovo | 150 | Arbër Emini |
| 106 | Ujedinjenje | 151 | Lëvizja e Pavarur e Kaçanikut |
| 107 | Muhamet Ademaj | 152 | Agron Kajtazi |
| 108 | Ne Mundemi | 153 | Selajdin Bytyçi |
| 109 | Shaban Miftari | 154 | Inciativa Demokracia |
| 110 | Zëri i Drejtësisë | 155 | SDU–Naša inicijativa |
| 111 | Fatmir Selimi | 156 | United Roma Party of Kosovo |
| 112 | Lulzim Shoshi | 157 | Xhavit Murati |
| 115 | Lidhja e Prishtinës | 158 | Srpska Narodna Sloga |
| 116 | Građanska inicijativa "Koreni" – Ivan Vučković | 159 | Iniciativa Qytetare për Mogillën |
| 117 | Forca e Diasporës | 160 | Social Democratic Union (Kosovo) |
| 119 | Avdiu Aliu | 161 | Iniciativa Balli |
| 120 | Gani Veselaj | 162 | New Democratic Initiative of Kosovo |
| 120 | Kosovski Savez | 163 | Bashkim Fazliu |
| 121 | Artin Velijaj | 164 | Vatra |
| 122 | New Kosovo Alliance | 165 | Prishtina në dorën tënde |
| 123 | Srpski Narodni Pokret | 166 | Rrahim Morina |
| 124 | Iniciativa Qytetare Mitrovica | 167 | Nova Demokratska Stranka |
| 125 | Lëvizja për Bashkimin e Shqiptarëve | 168 | Iniciativa Qytetare për Ndryshim Lokal |
| 126 | Novo Lice – Narodna Pravda | 169 | Serb Democracy |
| 127 | Ura | 170 | Serb List |
| 128 | Epoka e Hyjneshës në Prishtinë | 171 | Granit Prestreshi |
| 129 | Ndryshe UDK | 172 | Zastovo Pravdo Opstanak |
| 130 | Lulzim Syla | 173 | Kosova Adalet Turk Partisi |
| 131 | Kadri Hasani | 176 | Hasan Ismajli |
| 132 | Shqipe Muja | 177 | Pravda i Jednakost |
| 133 | Ilir Pallqa | 178 | Mamuşa Halk Hareketi |
| 134 | Bošnjačka stranka Kosova | 179 | Balli Kombëtar |
| 135 | Unioni i Blakçorëve | 180 | Democratic Ashkali Party of Kosovo |
| 136 | Ahmet Vishi | 181 | Rufki Suma |
| 137 | Egyptian Liberal Party | 182 | Iniciativa për Mitrovicën Veriore |
| 138 | Për Drenas e Kosovë | 183 | Unique Gorani Party |
| 139 | Progressive Movement of Kosovar Roma | 184 | Bashkimi për Ndryshim Anamorava |
| 140 | Ardian Foniqi | 185 | Yenilikçi Türk Hareket Partisi |
| 141 | E vërteta | 187 | Albanian Christian Democratic Party of Kosovo |
| 142 | Inciativa Shqiptare Mogill Kllokot | 188 | Katarina Adančić |
| 143 | Jeton Abazaj | 189 | Ljubiša Rakinac |
| 144 | Bashkimi Demokratik i Prizrenit | 190 | Vizioni për Zhvillimin e Kaçanikut |
| 145 | Bashkimi Demokratik | 192 | Forca e Re Kombëtare |

== Mayoral results ==
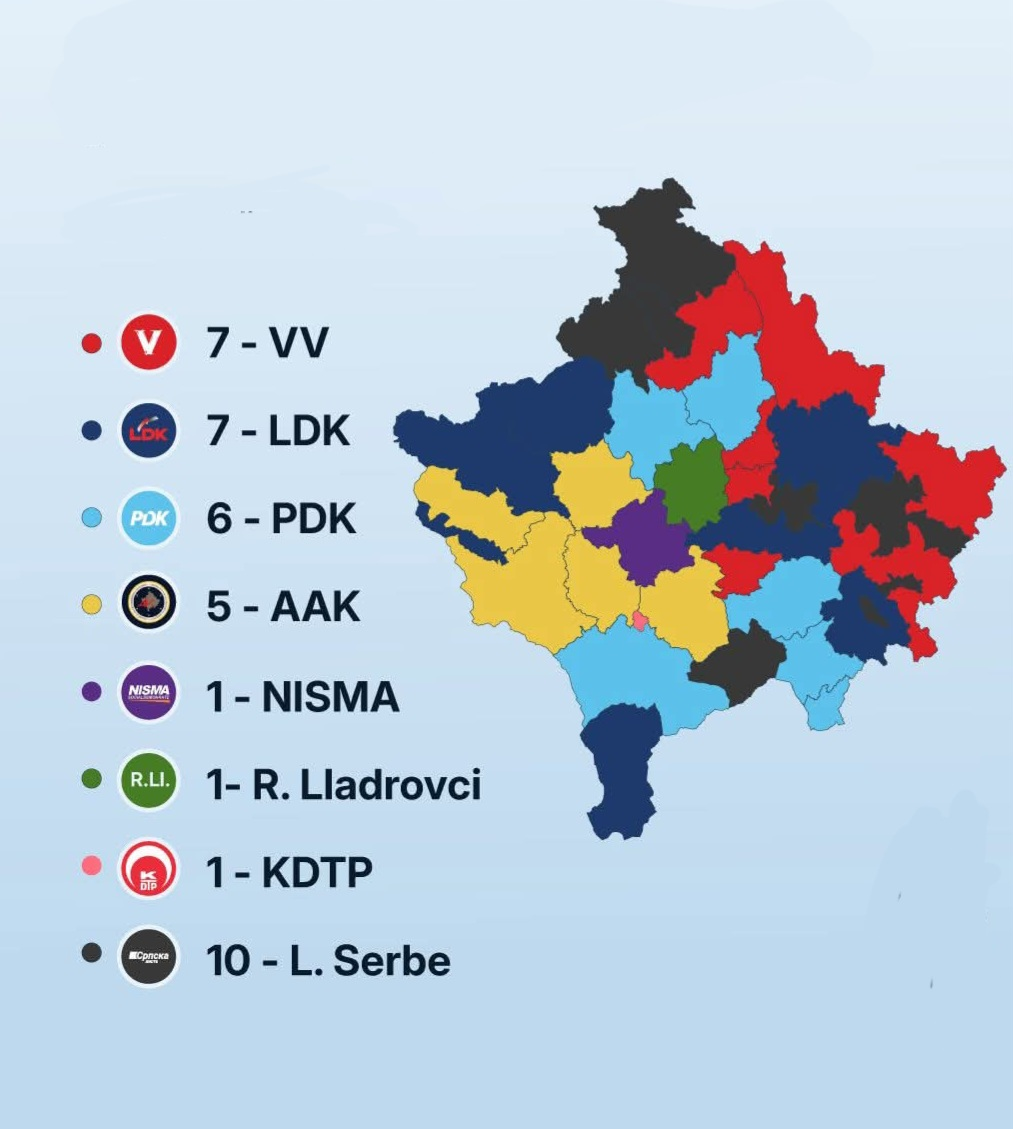
Kosovo Local Elections 2025

| Emblem | Municipalities | Population | Incumbent mayor | Party | Elected mayor | Party | Seats |
|---|---|---|---|---|---|---|---|
| | Deçan | 27,775 | Bashkim Ramosaj | AAK | Bashkim Ramosaj | AAK | 11 / 21 |
| | Dragash | 28,896 | Bexhet Xheladini | LDK | Bexhet Xheladini | LDK | 8 / 21 |
| | Drenas | 48,079 | Ramiz Lladrovci | PDK | Ramiz Lladrovci | PDK-RLL | 11 / 27 |
| | Ferizaj | 109,255 | Agim Aliu | PDK | Agim Aliu | PDK | 18 / 41 |
| | Gjakova | 78,699 | Ardian Gjini | AAK | Ardian Gjini | AAK | 11 / 35 |
| | Gjilan | 82,980 | Alban Hyseni | VV | Alban Hyseni | VV | 13 / 35 |
| | Gračanica | 18,486 | Ljiljana Šubarić | SL | Novak Živić | SL | 12 / 19 |
| | Hani i Elezit | 8,533 | Mehmet Ballazhi | PDK | Mehmet Ballazhi | PDK | 6 / 15 |
| | Istog | 33,008 | Ilir Ferati | LDK | Ilir Ferati | LDK | 14 / 27 |
| | Junik | 3,943 | Ruzhdi Shehu | LDK | Ruzhdi Shehu | LDK | 6 / 15 |
| | Kaçanik | 27,716 | Besim Ilazi | PDK | Sabedin Vishi | PDK | 8 / 21 |
| | Kamenica | 22,868 | Kadri Rahimaj | VV | Kadri Rahimaj | VV | 9 / 21 |
| | Klina | 30,503 | Zenun Elezi | AAK | Zenun Elezi | AAK | 13 / 27 |
| | Klokot | 3,041 | Vladan Bogdanović | SL | Božidar Dejanović | SL | 6 / 15 |
| | Fushë Kosovë | 63,949 | Burim Berisha | LDK | Valon Prebreza | VV | 10 / 31 |
| | Leposavić | 9,485 | Lulzim Hetemi | VV | Zoran Tadić | SL | 12 / 19 |
| | Lipjan | 55,044 | Imri Ahmeti | LDK | Imri Ahmeti | LDK | 16 / 31 |
| | Malisheva | 43,888 | Ekrem Kastrati | NISMA | Ekrem Kastrati | NISMA | 13 / 27 |
| | Mamusha | 5,607 | Abdülhadi Krasniç | KDTP | Abdülhadi Krasniç | KDTP | 8 / 15 |
| | Mitrovica | 64,742 | Bedri Hamza | PDK | Faton Peci | VV | 7 / 35 |
| | North Mitrovica | 7,920 | Erden Atić | VV | Milan Radojević | SL | 10 / 15 |
| | Novo Brdo | 4,493 | Saša Milošević | SL | Saša Milošević | SL | 9 / 15 |
| | Obiliq | 22,815 | Xhafer Gashi | LDK | Halil Thaçi | VV | 9 / 21 |
| | Parteš | 3,240 | Dragan Petković | SL | Dragan Petković | SL | 14 / 15 |
| | Peja | 82,745 | Gazmend Muhaxheri | LDK | Gazmend Muhaxheri | LDK | 14 / 35 |
| | Pristina | 227,466 | Përparim Rama | LDK | Përparim Rama | LDK | 15 / 51 |
| | Prizren | 147,246 | Shaqir Totaj | PDK | Shaqir Totaj | PDK | 13 / 41 |
| | Podujevë | 70,975 | Shpejtim Bulliqi | VV | Shpejtim Bulliqi | VV | 15 / 35 |
| | Rahovec | 41,799 | Smajl Latifi | AAK | Smajl Latifi | AAK | 10 / 27 |
| | Ranilug | 2,481 | Katarina Ristić–Ilić | SL | Tanja Antić | SL | 12 / 15 |
| | Skenderaj | 40,664 | Fadil Nura | PDK | Sami Lushtaku | PDK | 21 / 27 |
| | Štrpce | 10,771 | Dalibor Jevtić | SL | Ivica Tanasijević | SL | 12 / 19 |
| | Shtime | 24,308 | Qemajl Aliu | VV | Qemajl Aliu | VV | 8 / 21 |
| | Suva Reka | 45,749 | Bali Muharremi | AAK | Bali Muharremi | AAK | 9 / 27 |
| | Viti | 35,566 | Sokol Haliti | LDK | Sokol Haliti | LDK | 10 / 27 |
| | Vushtrri | 61,528 | Ferit Idrizi | PDK | Ferit Idrizi | PDK | 12 / 31 |
| | Zubin Potok | 3,358 | Izmir Zeqiri | PDK | Miloš Perović | SL | 11 / 15 |
| | Zvečan | 2,867 | Ilir Peci | PDK | Dragiša Milović | SL | 13 / 15 |

== Results of 1st & 2nd Round ==
=== Deçan ===
On 21 August, the Central Election Commission recommended not certifying Korab Mushkolaj as a candidate of the Democratic Party of Kosovo, on the grounds that he is a member of the foreign service. The CEC recommendation passed with 9 votes in favor and 2 against. On 1 September, PDK presented Jetmir Prekalla as the new candidate for mayor.

Mayoral results
| Candidate | Party | Votes | % |
|---|---|---|---|
| Bashkim Ramosaj (incumbent) | Alliance for the Future of Kosovo | 8,645 | 50.98 |
| Jeton Mushkolaj | Democratic League of Kosovo | 3,788 | 22.34 |
| Natyra Kuçi | Social Democratic Party of Kosovo | 2,006 | 11.83 |
| Shkumbin Demaliaj | Iniciativa Qytetare "Demokracia" | 1,467 | 8.65 |
| Faton Selmanaj | Vetëvendosje | 877 | 5.17 |
| Jetmir Prekalla | Democratic Party of Kosovo | 146 | 0.86 |
| Shefqet Tolaj | Guxo | 30 | 0.18 |
| Total | | 16,959 | 100.00 |

=== Dragash ===
Mayoral results
| Candidate | Party | First round | | Second round | |
| Candidate | Party | Votes | % | Votes | % |
|---|---|---|---|---|---|
| Bexhet Xheladini (incumbent) | Democratic League of Kosovo | 6,670 | 45.62 | 7,038 | 59.19 |
| Shaban Shabani | Democratic Party of Kosovo | 4,102 | 28.05 | 4,852 | 40.81 |
| Filiz Mustafa | Vetëvendosje | 2,460 | 16.82 | | |
| Usmen Baldži | Vakat Coalition | 761 | 5.20 | | |
| Nedžmidin Sejdilar | Independent | 629 | 4.30 | | |
| Total | | 14,622 | 100.00 | 11,890 | 100.00 |

=== Drenas ===
Mayoral results
| Candidate | Party | Votes | % |
|---|---|---|---|
| Ramiz Lladrovci (incumbent) | Për Drenasin Kampion me Ramiz Lladrovcin | 13,322 | 52.02 |
| Petrit Hajdari | Democratic Party of Kosovo | 9,581 | 37.42 |
| Egzona Tërdovci | Vetëvendosje | 1,058 | 4.13 |
| Naim Bazaj | Për Drenas e Kosovë | 635 | 2.48 |
| Ajvaz Berisha | Bashkimi Demokratik | 634 | 2.48 |
| Gazmend Heta | Democratic League of Kosovo | 195 | 0.76 |
| Beqir Kiqina | Alliance for the Future of Kosovo | 182 | 0.71 |
| Total | | 25,607 | 100.00 |

=== Ferizaj ===
Mayoral results
| Candidate | Party | Votes | % |
|---|---|---|---|
| Agim Aliu (incumbent) | Democratic Party of Kosovo | 29,787 | 56.47 |
| Enver Haliti | Vetëvendosje | 14,949 | 28.34 |
| Visar Azemi | Democratic League of Kosovo | 7,133 | 13.52 |
| Xhemile Shabani Murati | Alliance for the Future of Kosovo | 880 | 1.67 |
| Total | | 52,749 | 100.00 |

=== Gjakovë ===
On 21 September, the candidate of the Albanian Democratic National Front Party for the mayor of Gjakova, Nikollë Perkaj, passed away. Despite his passing, Nikollë Perkaj will remain on the ballot on election day.

Mayoral results
| Candidate | Party | First round | | Second round | |
| Candidate | Party | Votes | % | Votes | % |
|---|---|---|---|---|---|
| Ardian Gjini (incumbent) | Alliance for the Future of Kosovo | 19,974 | 47.53 | 17,635 | 56.69 |
| Ardian Gola | Vetëvendosje | 13,403 | 31.89 | 13,475 | 43.31 |
| Shefqet Shehu | Democratic League of Kosovo | 3,339 | 7.94 | | |
| Anton Shala | Albanian Christian Democratic Party of Kosovo | 2,716 | 6.46 | | |
| Ervin Shabani | Democratic Party of Kosovo | 2,411 | 5.74 | | |
| Mehmet Krasniqi | Ndryshe – UDK | 123 | 0.29 | | |
| ~~Nikollë Perkaj~~ (deceased) | ~~Albanian National Front Party~~ | 62 | 0.15 | | |
| Total | | 42,028 | 100.00 | 31,110 | 100.00 |

=== Gjilan ===
On 12 September, the Guxo candidate Ilir Poroshtica withdrew from the race for mayor of Gjilan for personal reasons. Even though he withdrew, on election day his name will still appear on the ballots because his withdrawal came after his certification as a candidate.

Mayoral results
| Candidate | Party | First round | | Second round | |
| Candidate | Party | Votes | % | Votes | % |
|---|---|---|---|---|---|
| Alban Hyseni (incumbent) | Vetëvendosje | 22,264 | 49.80 | 22,942 | 61.26 |
| Arbër Ismajli | Democratic League of Kosovo | 15,332 | 34.29 | 14,506 | 38.74 |
| Riad Rashiti | Democratic Party of Kosovo | 5,447 | 12.18 | | |
| Nazim Gagica | Alliance for the Future of Kosovo | 873 | 1.95 | | |
| Isa Agushi | Bashkimi për Ndryshim – Anamorava | 637 | 1.42 | | |
| ~~Ilir Poroshtica~~ (withdrew) | ~~Guxo~~ | 157 | 0.35 | | |
| Total | | 44,710 | 100.00 | 37,448 | 100.00 |

=== Graçanicë ===
Mayoral results
| Candidate | Party | Votes | % |
|---|---|---|---|
| Novak Živić | Serb List | 7,205 | 62.57 |
| Leutrim Ajeti | Aleanca Shqiptare | 2,660 | 23.10 |
| Igor Rašić | For Freedom, Justice and Survival | 1,488 | 12.92 |
| Goran Marinković | Kosovski Savez | 163 | 1.42 |
| Total | | 11,516 | 100.00 |

=== Hani i Elezit ===
Mayoral results
| Candidate | Party | Votes | % |
|---|---|---|---|
| Mehmet Ballazhi (incumbent) | Democratic Party of Kosovo | 2,725 | 51.26 |
| Rufki Suma | Independent | 2,591 | 48.74 |
| Total | | 5,316 | 100.00 |

=== Istog ===
Mayoral results
| Candidate | Party | Votes | % |
|---|---|---|---|
| Ilir Ferati (incumbent) | Democratic League of Kosovo | 11,854 | 59.06 |
| Ali Nimanaj | Democratic Party of Kosovo | 4,383 | 21.84 |
| Astrit Bujupaj | Vetëvendosje | 2,673 | 13.32 |
| Ukë Blakaj | Alliance for the Future of Kosovo | 1,160 | 5.78 |
| Total | | 20,070 | 100.00 |

=== Junik ===
Mayoral results
| Candidate | Party | First round | | Second round | |
| Candidate | Party | Votes | % | Votes | % |
|---|---|---|---|---|---|
| Ruzhdi Shehu (incumbent) | Democratic League of Kosovo | 1,807 | 48.89 | 2,037 | 57.38 |
| Agron Kuçi | Alliance for the Future of Kosovo | 1,437 | 38.88 | 1,513 | 42.62 |
| Jetmir Tofaj | Vetëvendosje | 436 | 11.80 | | |
| Fatos Shala | Democratic Party of Kosovo | 16 | 0.43 | | |
| Total | | 3,696 | 100.00 | 3,550 | 100.00 |

=== Kamenica ===
Mayoral results
| Candidate | Party | Votes | % |
|---|---|---|---|
| Kadri Rahimaj (incumbent) | Vetëvendosje | 8,073 | 51.39 |
| Qëndron Kastrati | Social Democratic Party of Kosovo | 4,322 | 27.51 |
| Shaip Surdulli | Democratic League of Kosovo | 1,388 | 8.84 |
| Faton Jakupi | Alliance for the Future of Kosovo | 1,208 | 7.69 |
| Jona Arifi | Democratic Party of Kosovo | 718 | 4.57 |
| Total | | 15,709 | 100.00 |

=== Kaçanik ===
Mayoral results
| Candidate | Party | First round | | Second round | |
| Candidate | Party | Votes | % | Votes | % |
|---|---|---|---|---|---|
| Sabedin Vishi | Democratic Party of Kosovo | 6,827 | 39.61 | 7,709 | 51.19 |
| Jeton Raka | Vetëvendosje | 6,540 | 37.94 | 7,350 | 48.81 |
| Heset Malsiu | Vizioni për Zhvillimin e Kaçanikut | 2,477 | 14.37 | | |
| Betim Shala | Democratic League of Kosovo | 834 | 4.84 | | |
| Shukri Luta | Levizja e pavarur e Kaçanikut | 268 | 1.55 | | |
| Hafize Sallahi | Alliance for the Future of Kosovo | 242 | 1.40 | | |
| Ahmet Vishi | Independent | 49 | 0.28 | | |
| Total | | 17,237 | 100.00 | 15,059 | 100.00 |

=== Klinë ===
Mayoral results
| Candidate | Party | First round | | Second round | |
| Candidate | Party | Votes | % | Votes | % |
|---|---|---|---|---|---|
| Zenun Elezaj (incumbent) | Alliance for the Future of Kosovo | 9,109 | 48.47 | 8,411 | 58.06 |
| Sokol Bashota | Democratic Party of Kosovo | 6,655 | 35.41 | 6,076 | 41.94 |
| Arben Limanaj | Democratic League of Kosovo | 1,902 | 10.12 | | |
| Ramiz Rrustaj | Vetëvendosje | 1,129 | 6.01 | | |
| Total | | 18,795 | 100.00 | 14,487 | 100.00 |

=== Kllokot ===
On 3 November, the Srpska Narodna Sloga candidate Srećko Spasić withdrew from the mayoral race in Kllokot after joining the Serb List. One day after the second round of the election, he was appointed head of the Provisional Municipal Body of Vitina, a Serbian parallel administrative structure in Kosovo. Despite his withdrawal, his name remained on the ballot, as it occurred after his certification as a candidate.

Mayoral results
| Candidate | Party | First round | | Second round | |
| Candidate | Party | Votes | % | Votes | % |
|---|---|---|---|---|---|
| Božidar Dejanović | Serb List | 893 | 41.38 | 960 | 90.14 |
| ~~Srećko Spasić~~ (withdrew) | ~~Srpska Narodna Sloga~~ | 674 | 31.23 | 105 | 9.86 |
| Arbër Emini | Independent | 518 | 24.00 | | |
| Goran Marinković | Kosovski Savez | 73 | 3.38 | | |
| Total | | 2,158 | 100.00 | 1,065 | 100.00 |

=== Fushë Kosovë ===
Mayoral results
| Candidate | Party | First round | | Second round | |
| Candidate | Party | Votes | % | Votes | % |
|---|---|---|---|---|---|
| Valon Prebreza | Vetëvendosje | 9,733 | 45.15 | 10,791 | 55.12 |
| Besnik Osmani | Democratic League of Kosovo | 7,902 | 36.66 | 8,786 | 44.88 |
| Rrahim Tërnava | Democratic Party of Kosovo | 3,481 | 16.15 | | |
| Vildane Latifi | Alliance for the Future of Kosovo | 258 | 1.20 | | |
| Hasan Ismajli | Independent | 182 | 0.84 | | |
| Total | | 21,556 | 100.00 | 19,577 | 100.00 |

=== Leposaviq ===
Mayoral results
| Candidate | Party | Votes | % |
|---|---|---|---|
| Zoran Tadić | Serb List | 5,331 | 73.28 |
| Vladimir Radosavljević | Serb Democracy | 652 | 8.96 |
| Vesna Pantović | For Freedom, Justice and Survival | 425 | 5.84 |
| Ivan Vučković | Građanska Inicijativa "Koreni" - Ivan Vučković | 389 | 5.35 |
| Nenad Radosavljević | Novi Lice - Narodna Pravda | 188 | 2.58 |
| Lulzim Hetemi (incumbent) | Vetëvendosje | 146 | 2.01 |
| Shaqir Hetemi | Democratic Party of Kosovo | 144 | 1.98 |
| Total | | 7,275 | 100.00 |

=== Lipjan ===
Mayoral results
| Candidate | Party | Votes | % |
|---|---|---|---|
| Imri Ahmeti (incumbent) | Democratic League of Kosovo | 15,382 | 51.02 |
| Shukri Buja | Democratic Party of Kosovo | 9,118 | 30.24 |
| Ilir Qeriqi | Vetëvendosje | 5,022 | 16.66 |
| Ardian Bytyqi | Guxo | 398 | 1.32 |
| Bashkim Budakova | Alliance for the Future of Kosovo | 229 | 0.76 |
| Total | | 30,149 | 100.00 |

=== Malisheva ===
Mayoral results
| Candidate | Party | Votes | % |
|---|---|---|---|
| Ekrem Kastrati (incumbent) | Nisma | 11,348 | 52.50 |
| Gëzim Krasniqi | Democratic Party of Kosovo | 4,126 | 19.09 |
| Valon Hoti | Vetëvendosje | 3,392 | 15.69 |
| Fatmir Ademaj | Democratic League of Kosovo | 1,765 | 8.17 |
| Enver Hoti | Alliance for the Future of Kosovo | 619 | 2.86 |
| Valon Krasniqi | Guxo | 305 | 1.41 |
| Selajdin Bytyqi | Independent | 60 | 0.28 |
| Total | | 21,615 | 100.00 |
Source: KQZ

=== Mamusha ===
Mayoral results
| Candidate | Party | First round | | Second round | |
| Candidate | Party | Votes | % | Votes | % |
|---|---|---|---|---|---|
| Abdülhadi Krasniç (incumbent) | Turkish Democratic Party of Kosovo | 1,634 | 49.80 | 1,635 | 51.14 |
| Fikret Morina | Mamuşa Halk Hareket | 1,602 | 48.83 | 1,562 | 48.86 |
| Agron Mazrek | Vetëvendosje | 45 | 1.37 | | |
| Total | | 3,281 | 100.00 | 3,197 | 100.00 |

=== Mitrovicë e Jugut ===
Mayoral results
| Candidate | Party | First round | | Second round | |
| Candidate | Party | Votes | % | Votes | % |
|---|---|---|---|---|---|
| Faton Peci | Vetëvendosje; Guxo | 15,830 | 47.94 | 18,235 | 53.67 |
| Arian Tahiri | Democratic Party of Kosovo | 15,708 | 47.57 | 15,743 | 46.33 |
| Gëzim Plakolli | Democratic League of Kosovo | 1,225 | 3.71 | | |
| Qazim Nimani | Alliance for the Future of Kosovo | 255 | 0.77 | | |
| Total | | 33,018 | 100.00 | 33,978 | 100.00 |

=== Mitrovicë e Veriut ===
Mayoral results
| Candidate | Party | Votes | % |
|---|---|---|---|
| Milan Radojević | Serb List | 4,697 | 60.09 |
| Marko Jakšić | Građanska inicijativa Sever za sve | 950 | 12.15 |
| Erden Atiq (incumbent) | Vetëvendosje | 863 | 11.04 |
| Aleksandar Arsenijević | Serb Democracy | 567 | 7.25 |
| Flutra Hamza Azemi | Democratic Party of Kosovo | 321 | 4.11 |
| Nenad Vukmirović | For Freedom, Justice and Survival | 129 | 1.65 |
| Branko Veselinović | Srpski Narodni Pokret | 94 | 1.20 |
| Betim Osmani | Iniciativa Qytetare Mitrovica | 92 | 1.18 |
| Katarina Ađančić | Independent | 67 | 0.86 |
| Nebojša Milić | Novi Lice - Narodna Pravda | 36 | 0.46 |
| Total | | 7,816 | 100.00 |

=== Novobërdë ===
Mayoral results
| Candidate | Party | Votes | % |
|---|---|---|---|
| Saša Milošević (incumbent) | Serb List | 3,637 | 61.54 |
| Bajrush Ymeri | Democratic League of Kosovo | 1,328 | 22.47 |
| Abdyl Gashi | Vetëvendosje | 596 | 10.08 |
| Ajet Avdili | Alliance for the Future of Kosovo | 208 | 3.52 |
| Selatin Nuhiu | Democratic Party of Kosovo | 141 | 2.39 |
| Total | | 5,910 | 100.00 |
Source: KQZ

=== Obiliq ===
Mayoral results
| Candidate | Party | First round | | Second round | |
| Candidate | Party | Votes | % | Votes | % |
|---|---|---|---|---|---|
| Xhafer Gashi (incumbent) | Democratic League of Kosovo | 5,859 | 46.20 | 6,202 | 48.71 |
| Halil Thaçi | Vetëvendosje | 5,626 | 44.37 | 6,530 | 51.29 |
| Goran Dančetović | Serb List | 606 | 4.78 | | |
| Ali Krasniqi | Alliance for the Future of Kosovo | 299 | 2.36 | | |
| Nysret Kelmendi | Democratic Party of Kosovo | 225 | 1.77 | | |
| Shefki Salihu | Nisma | 66 | 0.52 | | |
| Total | | 12,681 | 100.00 | 12,732 | 100.00 |
Source: KQZ

=== Partesh ===
Mayoral results
| Candidate | Party | Votes | % |
|---|---|---|---|
| Dragan Petković (incumbent) | Serb List | 1,836 | 89.91 |
| Sladjan Mladenović | Kosovski Savez | 206 | 10.09 |
| Total | | 2,042 | 100.00 |
Source: KQZ

=== Peja ===
Mayoral results
| Candidate | Party | First round | | Second round | |
| Candidate | Party | Votes | % | Votes | % |
|---|---|---|---|---|---|
| Gazmend Muhaxheri (incumbent) | Democratic League of Kosovo | 19,786 | 46.25 | 20,043 | 61.09 |
| Taulant Kelmendi | Vetëvendosje | 11,883 | 27.78 | 12,766 | 38.91 |
| Ali Berisha | Alliance for the Future of Kosovo | 7,790 | 18.21 | | |
| Arta Nallbani | Democratic Party of Kosovo | 2,124 | 4.97 | | |
| Jeton Abazaj | Independent | 491 | 1.15 | | |
| Senad Dacić | NDS | 293 | 0.68 | | |
| Reshat Nurboja | Alternativa | 279 | 0.65 | | |
| Vehbi Abdullaj | NISMA | 75 | 0.18 | | |
| Gani Veselaj | Independent | 58 | 0.14 | | |
| Total | | 42,779 | 100.00 | 32,809 | 100.00 |
Source: KQZ

=== Pristina ===
On 8 September, Nedime Belegu withdrew from the race due to health reasons, even though she had been certified by the Central Election Commission.

Mayoral results
| Candidate | Party | First round | | Second round | |
| Candidate | Party | Votes | % | Votes | % |
|---|---|---|---|---|---|
| Përparim Rama (incumbent) | Democratic League of Kosovo | 35,595 | 33.71 | 47,303 | 51.41 |
| Hajrulla Çeku | Vetëvendosje | 35,077 | 33.21 | 44,712 | 48.59 |
| Uran Ismaili | Democratic Party of Kosovo | 29,203 | 27.65 | | |
| Bekë Berisha | Alliance for the Future of Kosovo | 3,298 | 3.12 | | |
| Besa Shahini | Social Democratic Party of Kosovo | 1,652 | 1.56 | | |
| Fatmir Selimi | Independent | 256 | 0.24 | | |
| Merkur Beqiri | Alternativa | 199 | 0.19 | | |
| Agim Krasniqi | Prishtina në dorën tende | 181 | 0.17 | | |
| Lulzim Syla | Independent | 77 | 0.07 | | |
| ~~Nedime Belegu~~ (withdrew) | ~~Epoka e Hyjneshës në Prishtinë~~ | 69 | 0.07 | | |
| Total | | 105,607 | 100.00 | 92,015 | 100.00 |
Source: KQZ

=== Prizren ===
Mayoral results
| Candidate | Party | First round | | Second round | |
| Candidate | Party | Votes | % | Votes | % |
|---|---|---|---|---|---|
| Shaqir Totaj (incumbent) | Democratic Party of Kosovo | 26,427 | 41.45 | 25,523 | 53.42 |
| Artan Abrashi | Vetëvendosje | 19,375 | 30.39 | 22,252 | 46.58 |
| Driton Selmanaj | Democratic League of Kosovo | 6,686 | 10.49 | | |
| Zafir Berisha | Bashkimi Demokratik për Prizrenin | 3,123 | 4.90 | | |
| Furkan Bütüçi | Turkish Democratic Party of Kosovo | 2,459 | 3.86 | | |
| Emilija Redžepi | New Democratic Party | 2,307 | 3.62 | | |
| Besnik Krasniqi | Alliance for the Future of Kosovo | 2,214 | 3.47 | | |
| Albulena Balaj-Halimaj | Nisma | 1,171 | 1.84 | | |
| Total | | 63,762 | 100.00 | 47,775 | 100.00 |

=== Podujevë ===
Mayoral results
| Candidate | Party | Votes | % |
|---|---|---|---|
| Shpejtim Bulliqi (incumbent) | Vetëvendosje | 21,080 | 53.67 |
| Ekrem Hyseni | Democratic League of Kosovo | 15,258 | 38.85 |
| Isak Shabani | Democratic Party of Kosovo | 2,435 | 6.20 |
| Baki Feta | Alliance for the Future of Kosovo | 288 | 0.73 |
| Xhemajl Hasani | Nisma | 214 | 0.54 |
| Total | | 39,275 | 100.00 |
Source: KQZ

=== Rahovec ===
Mayoral results
| Candidate | Party | First round | | Second round | |
| Candidate | Party | Votes | % | Votes | % |
|---|---|---|---|---|---|
| Smajl Latifi (incumbent) | Alliance for the Future of Kosovo | 8,078 | 37.18 | 8,521 | 52.17 |
| Ali Dula | Vetëvendosje | 5,199 | 23.93 | 7,812 | 47.83 |
| Burim Krasniqi | Democratic League of Kosovo | 5,124 | 23.58 | | |
| Edon Cana | Democratic Party of Kosovo | 3,327 | 15.31 | | |
| Total | | 21,728 | 100.00 | 16,333 | 100.00 |

=== Ranillug ===
Mayoral results
| Candidate | Party | Votes | % |
|---|---|---|---|
| Tanja Antić | Serb List | 1,994 | 71.11 |
| Ivan Petrović | Srpski Narodni Pokret | 394 | 14.05 |
| Igor Mitić | For Freedom, Justice and Survival | 355 | 12.66 |
| Bojan Arsić | Kosovski Savez | 61 | 2.18 |
| Total | | 2,804 | 100.00 |
Source: KQZ

=== Skenderaj ===
Mayoral results
| Candidate | Party | Votes | % |
|---|---|---|---|
| Sami Lushtaku | Democratic Party of Kosovo | 13,042 | 83.36 |
| Hysni Mehani | Vetëvendosje | 1,544 | 9.87 |
| Sokol Halili | Independent | 1,060 | 6.77 |
| Total | | 15,646 | 100.00 |
Source: KQZ

=== Štrpce ===
Mayoral results
| Candidate | Party | Votes | % |
|---|---|---|---|
| Ivica Tanasijević | Serb List | 3,892 | 59.31 |
| Garip Sahiti | Democratic Party of Kosovo | 635 | 9.68 |
| Valmir Ahmeti | Democratic League of Kosovo | 599 | 9.13 |
| Stefan Stamenković | Pravda i Jednakost | 563 | 8.58 |
| Slađan Nikolčević | For Freedom, Justice and Survival | 538 | 8.20 |
| Shpejtim Arifi | Vetëvendosje | 335 | 5.11 |
| Total | | 6,562 | 100.00 |
Source: KQZ

=== Shtime ===
Mayoral results
| Candidate | Party | Votes | % |
|---|---|---|---|
| Qemajl Aliu (incumbent) | Vetëvendosje | 7,325 | 50.46 |
| Përparim Ramusa | Democratic Party of Kosovo | 5,387 | 37.11 |
| Kastriot Shabani | Democratic League of Kosovo | 1,721 | 11.86 |
| Ramë Bislimi | Alliance for the Future of Kosovo | 83 | 0.57 |
| Total | | 14,516 | 100.00 |
Source: KQZ

=== Suva Reka ===
Mayoral results
| Candidate | Party | First round | | Second round | |
| Candidate | Party | Votes | % | Votes | % |
|---|---|---|---|---|---|
| Bali Muharremaj (incumbent) | Alliance for the Future of Kosovo | 12,937 | 45.42 | 12,036 | 55.34 |
| Ardian Shala | Democratic League of Kosovo | 8,922 | 31.32 | 9,715 | 44.66 |
| Hamdi Bytyçi | Vetëvendosje | 3,969 | 13.93 | | |
| Dardan Berisha | Democratic Party of Kosovo | 2,657 | 9.33 | | |
| Total | | 28,485 | 100.00 | 21,751 | 100.00 |

=== Viti ===
Mayoral results
| Candidate | Party | First round | | Second round | |
| Candidate | Party | Votes | % | Votes | % |
|---|---|---|---|---|---|
| Sokol Haliti (incumbent) | Democratic League of Kosovo | 7,874 | 38.01 | 8,623 | 50.39 |
| Arsim Ademi | Vetëvendosje | 6,930 | 33.46 | 8,488 | 49.61 |
| Bekim Azizi | Democratic Party of Kosovo | 5,310 | 25.64 | | |
| Labinot Bislimi | Alliance for the Future of Kosovo | 599 | 2.89 | | |
| Total | | 20,713 | 100.00 | 17,111 | 100.00 |

=== Vushtrri ===
Mayoral results
| Candidate | Party | First round | | Second round | |
| Candidate | Party | Votes | % | Votes | % |
|---|---|---|---|---|---|
| Ferit Idrizi (incumbent) | Democratic Party of Kosovo | 13,799 | 45.24 | 14,580 | 54.06 |
| Sylejman Meholli | Vetëvendosje | 9,399 | 30.81 | 12,390 | 45.94 |
| Xhafer Tahiri | Democratic League of Kosovo | 6,051 | 19.84 | | |
| Xhevahire Izmaku | Nisma | 741 | 2.43 | | |
| Mensut Ademi | Alliance for the Future of Kosovo | 290 | 0.95 | | |
| Shaban Miftari | Independent | 225 | 0.74 | | |
| Total | | 30,505 | 100.00 | 26,970 | 100.00 |

=== Zubin Potok ===
Mayoral results
| Candidate | Party | Votes | % |
|---|---|---|---|
| Miloš Perović | Serb List | 2,877 | 70.57 |
| Milija Biševac | Srpski Narodni Pokret | 280 | 6.87 |
| Vedat Mehmeti | Vetëvendosje | 236 | 5.79 |
| Izmir Zeqiri (incumbent) | Democratic Party of Kosovo | 202 | 4.95 |
| Stevan Vulović | Kosovski Savez | 181 | 4.44 |
| Gordana Mihailović | For Freedom, Justice and Survival | 133 | 3.26 |
| Mirjana Vlašković | Serb Democracy | 69 | 1.69 |
| Grozdan Biševac | Novi Lice - Narodna Pravda | 55 | 1.35 |
| Ariana Hasani | Democratic League of Kosovo | 44 | 1.08 |
| Total | | 4,077 | 100.00 |

=== Zveçan ===
Mayoral results
| Candidate | Party | Votes | % |
|---|---|---|---|
| Dragiša Milović | Serb List | 3,420 | 84.99 |
| Zoran Obrenović | Serb Democracy | 336 | 8.35 |
| Ilir Peci (incumbent) | Democratic Party of Kosovo | 139 | 3.45 |
| Fetah Peci | Vetëvendosje | 92 | 2.29 |
| Vid Janićijevć | Ujedinjenje | 37 | 0.92 |
| Total | | 4,024 | 100.00 |

== Results by municipality (Council Seats) ==
| Municipality | LDK | | | LVV | | | PDK | | | AAK | | | SL | | | Others | | |
| Municipality | Votes | % | Seats | Votes | % | Seats | Votes | % | Seats | Votes | % | Seats | Votes | % | Seats | Votes | % | Seats |
|---|---|---|---|---|---|---|---|---|---|---|---|---|---|---|---|---|---|---|
| Deçan | 4,379 | 27.46 | 6 | 804 | 5.04 | 1 | 178 | 1.12 | 0 | 8,079 | 50.66 | 11 | did not run | | | 2,509 | 15.73 | 3 |
| Dragash | 5,054 | 35.77 | 8 | 2,185 | 15.47 | 3 | 3,924 | 27.77 | 6 | did not run | | | did not run | | | 2,965 | 20.98 | 4 |
| Drenas | 548 | 2.34 | 1 | 1,826 | 7.78 | 2 | 8,610 | 36.70 | 10 | 341 | 1.45 | 0 | did not run | | | 12,137 | 52.06 | 14 |
| Ferizaj | 8,169 | 16.52 | 7 | 10,376 | 20.99 | 8 | 21,233 | 42.95 | 18 | 3,741 | 7.57 | 3 | did not run | | | 5,921 | 11.97 | 4 |
| Gjakova | 5,016 | 12.87 | 5 | 7,168 | 18.39 | 7 | 5,886 | 15.10 | 5 | 12,611 | 32.35 | 11 | did not run | | | 8,306 | 21.31 | 7 |
| Gjilan | 12,424 | 29.18 | 10 | 16,258 | 38.19 | 13 | 6,155 | 14.46 | 5 | 2,784 | 6.54 | 2 | 1,092 | 2.56 | 1 | 3,861 | 9.08 | 4 |
| Gračanica | did not run | | | did not run | | | did not run | | | did not run | | | 6,916 | 63.92 | 13 | 3,904 | 36.08 | 6 |
| Hani i Elezit | 939 | 18.74 | 3 | 1,124 | 22.43 | 3 | 1,976 | 39.43 | 6 | 973 | 19.41 | 3 | did not run | | | no others | | |
| Istog | 9,823 | 50.83 | 14 | 2,105 | 10.89 | 3 | 4,077 | 21.10 | 6 | 1,690 | 8.75 | 2 | 265 | 1.37 | 0 | 1,365 | 7.06 | 2 |
| Junik | 1,445 | 40.37 | 6 | 640 | 17.88 | 3 | 57 | 1.59 | 0 | 1,339 | 37.41 | 6 | did not run | | | 98 | 2.74 | 0 |
| Kaçanik | 2,125 | 13.09 | 3 | 4,883 | 30.08 | 6 | 5,877 | 36.20 | 8 | 811 | 5.00 | 1 | did not run | | | 2,537 | 15.62 | 3 |
| Kamenica | 1,874 | 12.61 | 3 | 5,913 | 39.78 | 9 | 1,004 | 6.75 | 1 | 2,313 | 15.56 | 3 | 857 | 5.76 | 1 | 2,905 | 19.54 | 4 |
| Klina | 2,520 | 14.17 | 4 | 867 | 4.88 | 1 | 5,518 | 31.04 | 9 | 8,378 | 47.13 | 13 | 160 | 0.90 | 0 | 335 | 1.88 | 0 |
| Klokot | 210 | 9.99 | 2 | 154 | 7.32 | 1 | 169 | 8.04 | 1 | 143 | 6.80 | 1 | 851 | 40.47 | 6 | 546 | 27.39 | 4 |
| Kosovo Polje | 5,868 | 29.01 | 9 | 6,902 | 34.12 | 10 | 4,029 | 19.92 | 6 | 399 | 1.97 | 1 | 338 | 1.67 | 1 | 2,693 | 13.30 | 4 |
| Leposavić | did not run | | | 106 | 1.56 | 0 | 144 | 2.14 | 0 | did not run | | | 5,087 | 75.10 | 12 | 1,436 | 21.20 | 3 |
| Lipjan | 13,612 | 47.52 | 16 | 4,512 | 15.75 | 5 | 8,874 | 30.98 | 10 | 372 | 1.30 | 0 | 316 | 1.10 | 0 | 957 | 3.34 | 0 |
| Malisheva | 3,068 | 15.06 | 4 | 2,461 | 12.08 | 9 | 4,231 | 20.77 | 8 | 999 | 4.90 | 1 | did not run | | | 9,614 | 47.19 | 13 |
| Mamusha | did not run | | | 47 | 1.47 | 0 | 84 | 2.63 | 0 | did not run | | | did not run | | | 3,067 | 95.91 | 15 |
| Mitrovica | 3,736 | 12.08 | 4 | 7,047 | 22.86 | 7 | 12,451 | 40.24 | 13 | 498 | 1.61 | 0 | did not run | | | 7,180 | 24.82 | 7 |
| North Mitrovica | 50 | 0.66 | 0 | 607 | 8.02 | 1 | 321 | 4.24 | 1 | did not run | | | 4,719 | 63.36 | 10 | 1,870 | 23.72 | 3 |
| Novo Brdo | 1,117 | 19.66 | 3 | 498 | 8.76 | 1 | 106 | 1.87 | 0 | 208 | 3.66 | 1 | 3,489 | 61.39 | 9 | 265 | 4.66 | 1 |
| Obiliq | 5,122 | 42.84 | 9 | 5,079 | 42.48 | 9 | 245 | 2.05 | 0 | 303 | 2.53 | 1 | 1,143 | 9.56 | 2 | 63 | 0.53 | 0 |
| Parteš | did not run | | | did not run | | | did not run | | | did not run | | | 1,916 | 96.14 | 14 | 77 | 3.86 | 1 |
| Peja | 16,043 | 39.96 | 14 | 8,291 | 20.65 | 7 | 4,404 | 10.97 | 4 | 8,342 | 20.78 | 8 | 372 | 0.93 | 0 | 2,691 | 6.71 | 2 |
| Pristina | 29,063 | 29.10 | 15 | 21,853 | 21.88 | 12 | 22,409 | 22.44 | 12 | 10,006 | 10.02 | 5 | did not run | | | 16,540 | 16.56 | 7 |
| Prizren | 8,310 | 13.73 | 6 | 12,916 | 21.33 | 9 | 19,582 | 32.34 | 13 | 3,140 | 5.19 | 2 | did not run | | | 16,598 | 27.41 | 11 |
| Podujeva | 13,056 | 35.43 | 13 | 15,964 | 43.32 | 15 | 3,931 | 10.67 | 4 | 883 | 2.40 | 1 | did not run | | | 3,020 | 8.18 | 2 |
| Rahovec | 4,743 | 23.52 | 7 | 3,975 | 19.71 | 5 | 3,689 | 18.29 | 5 | 7,260 | 36.00 | 10 | did not run | | | 498 | 2.47 | 0 |
| Ranilug | did not run | | | did not run | | | did not run | | | did not run | | | 2,197 | 81.49 | 12 | 499 | 18.51 | 3 |
| Skenderaj | 210 | 1.41 | 0 | 1,392 | 9.35 | 3 | 11,919 | 80.04 | 21 | 336 | 2.26 | 1 | did not run | | | 1,034 | 6.94 | 2 |
| Štrpce | 455 | 7.19 | 1 | 249 | 3.93 | 1 | 515 | 8.14 | 2 | did not run | | | 3,926 | 62.02 | 12 | 1,185 | 18.72 | 3 |
| Shtime | 2,987 | 22.21 | 5 | 5,402 | 40.17 | 8 | 4,473 | 33.26 | 7 | 63 | 0.47 | 0 | did not run | | | 524 | 3.89 | 1 |
| Suva Reka | 7,989 | 29.94 | 8 | 3,846 | 14.41 | 4 | 4,671 | 17.50 | 5 | 9,334 | 34.98 | 9 | did not run | | | 845 | 3.17 | 1 |
| Viti | 7,007 | 36.15 | 10 | 5,237 | 27.02 | 7 | 5,478 | 28.26 | 8 | 834 | 4.30 | 1 | did not run | | | 827 | 4.26 | 1 |
| Vushtrri | 6,217 | 21.58 | 7 | 7,576 | 26.30 | 8 | 10,979 | 38.12 | 12 | 1,178 | 4.09 | 1 | 834 | 2.90 | 1 | 2,019 | 7.00 | 2 |
| Zubin Potok | 39 | 1.00 | 0 | 218 | 5.61 | 1 | 196 | 5.05 | 1 | did not run | | | 2,917 | 75.12 | 11 | 513 | 13.21 | 2 |
| Zvečan | did not run | | | 92 | 2.40 | 0 | 129 | 3.37 | 1 | did not run | | | 3,325 | 86.77 | 13 | 286 | 7.47 | 1 |
| Total | 183,218 | 24.27 | 203 | 168,573 | 22.33 | 182 | 187,524 | 24.84 | 208 | 86,358 | 11.44 | 98 | 40,720 | 5.39 | 117 | 88,494 | 11.73 | 140 |

=== Municipalities won by the parties ===
| Party | Municipalities | Change | Population |
|---|---|---|---|
| Serb List | Gračanica, Klokot, Leposavić, North Mitrovica, Novo Brdo, Parteš, Ranilug, Štrpce, Zubin Potok, Zvečan | ▲4 | 58,222 |
| Democratic League of Kosovo | Dragash, Istog, Junik, Lipjan, Peja, Pristina, Viti | ▼2 | 466,668 |
| Vetëvendosje | Gjilan, Fushë Kosova, Kamenica, Mitrovica, Obiliq, Podujevë, Shtime | ▲1 | 352,637 |
| Democratic Party of Kosovo | Ferizaj, Hani i Elezit, Kaçanik, Prizren, Skenderaj, Vushtrri | ▼3 | 394,942 |
| Alliance for the Future of Kosovo | Deçan, Gjakova, Klina, Rahovec, Suva Reka | 0 | 224,525 |
| Social Democratic Initiative | Malisheva | 0 | 43,888 |
| Për Drenasin Kampion me Ramiz Lladrovcin | Drenas | New | 48,079 |
| Turkish Democratic Party of Kosovo | Mamusha | 0 | 5,607 |
