= Croatian Party of Kosovo =

Defunct political party in Kosovo

Croatian Party of Kosovo Croatian: Hrvatska Stranka Kosova
- Abbreviation: HSK
- Leader: David Koljić
- Founded: 20 May 2013
- Dissolved: 12 January 2018

The Croatian Party of Kosovo (Croatian: Hrvatska Stranka Kosova; HSK) was a political party in Kosovo representing the interests of the country's Croatian community. It was registered as a political party on 20 May 2013 and was deregistered by the Central Election Commission of Kosovo on 12 January 2018.

== History ==
The Croatian Party of Kosovo was registered by Kosovo's Central Election Commission on 20 May 2013. It was one of several political parties registered during 2013.

The party participated in the 2013 Kosovan local elections, contesting seats in the municipalities of Viti and Lipjan. According to the European Centre for Minority Issues Kosovo, HSK participated in elections for the first time in 2013, and did not win a seat in either municipal assembly.

In Viti, HSK received 253 votes or 1.33% of the vote, and won no seats in the Municipal Assembly.

In Lipjan, the party's candidates received a combined 60 votes. The candidates listed by the Central Election Commission were Silvana Palić, Jakov Antić and Vilson Gečević.

In January 2014, HSK chairman David Koljić said that the party sought parliamentary representation for the Croatian community in Kosovo. Koljić argued that the Croatian community should receive a reserved seat in the Assembly of Kosovo and said that the party would challenge the absence of such representation if necessary.

The party was subsequently removed from Kosovo's register of political parties. The Central Election Commission's decisions for 2018 record the deregistration of the Croatian Party of Kosovo (HSK) on 12 January 2018.

== Political representation ==
The Croatian community is recognized as a national minority in Kosovo. The Croatian Party of Kosovo was established during a period when the Croatian community did not have a political party specifically representing it. The European Centre for Minority Issues Kosovo described HSK as the political party representing the interests of Kosovo's Croats and recorded its participation in the 2013 municipal elections.

== Electioral history ==
=== Local elections ===
Election	Municipality	Votes	Vote share	Seats
2013	Viti	253	1.33%	0
2013	Lipjan	60	—	0

== See also ==
- Politics of Kosovo
- Janjevci
- List of political parties in Kosovo
