= KQZ =

KQZ may refer to:

- Central Election Commission (Albania) (Komisioni Qendror i Zgjedhjeve i Shqipërisë)
- Central Election Commission (Kosovo) (Komisioni Qendror i Zgjedhjeve i Kosovës)
- KQZ, the Indian Railways station code for Kolar railway station, Karnataka, India
- kqz, the ISO code for the Khoemana language
