= 2021 Kosovan local elections =

Local government elections in Kosovo

2021 Kosovo local elections
- 17 October 2021
Party	Leader	Vote %	Seats	+/–
LDK	Lumir Abdixhiku	22.93%	206	−6
LVV	Albin Kurti	22.65%	193	+67
PDK	Memli Krasniqi	21.78%	206	−9
AAK	Ramush Haradinaj	12.25%	120	−7
SL	Goran Rakić	7.19%	117	0
NISMA	Fatmir Limaj	2.49%	21	−29
AKR	Behgjet Pacolli	1.38%	36	+1
This lists parties that won seats. See the complete results below.

Local elections were held in Kosovo on 17 October 2021. Only 17 municipalities elected a mayor in the first round, and 21 will vote again on 14 November 2021. In Hani i Elezit, the election was seriously hampered by election fraud, and a second ballot planned to be held in October/November 2021. On 25 October 2021, the Supreme Court annulled the decision for re-vote in Hani i Elezit.

== Electoral system ==
The Mayor and the members of the Assembly will be elected by open list proportional representation, with seats reserved for national minorities, in each Kosovo municipalities

== Parties and coalitions ==
Kosovo municipalities

The Central Election Commission has certified for municipal elections on October 17, 48 political subjects, of which 18 political parties, one coalition, 17 civic initiatives and 12 independent candidates.

== Mayoral results ==
Emblem	Municipalities	Population	Incumbent mayor	Party	Elected mayor	Party	Seats
	Deçan	40,019	Bashkim Ramosaj	AAK	Bashkim Ramosaj	AAK	16 / 27
	Dragash	33,997	Shaban Shabani	PDK	Bexhet Xheladini	LDK	8 / 27
	Ferizaj	108,610	Agim Aliu	PDK	Agim Aliu	PDK	17 / 41
	Gjakova	94,556	Ardian Gjini	AAK	Ardian Gjini	AAK	11 / 35
	Gjilan	90,178	Lutfi Haziri	LDK	Alban Hyseni	Vetëvendosje	10 / 35
	Drenas	58,531	Ramiz Lladrovci	PDK	Ramiz Lladrovci	PDK	14 / 31
	Gračanica	10,675	Srđan Popović	SL	Ljiljana Šubarić	SL	18 / 19
	Hani i Elezit	9,403	Rufki Suma	Independent	Mehmet Ballazhi	PDK	6 / 15
	Istog	39,289	Haki Rugova	LDK	Ilir Ferati	LDK	11 / 27
	Junik	6,084	Agron Kuçi	AAK	Ruzhdi Shehu	LDK	6 / 15
	Kaçanik	33,409	Besim Ilazi	PDK	Besim Ilazi	PDK	12 / 27
	Kamenica	36,085	Qëndron Kastrati	PSD	Kadri Rahimaj	Vetëvendosje	7 / 27
	Klina	38,496	Zenun Elezi	AAK	Zenun Elezi	AAK	11 / 27
	Klokot	2,556	Božidar Dejanović	Gi Klokot-Vrbovac	Vladan Bogdanović	SL	5 / 15
	Kosovo Polje	34,827	Burim Berisha	LDK	Burim Berisha	LDK	10 / 27
	Leposavić	13,773	Zoran Todić	SL	Zoran Todić	SL	19 / 19
	Lipjan	57,605	Imri Ahmeti	LDK	Imri Ahmeti	LDK	16 / 31
	Mališevo	54,613	Ragip Begaj	NISMA	Ekrem Kastrati	NISMA	10 / 31
	Mamusha	5,507	Abdülhadi Krasniç	KDTP	Abdülhadi Krasniç	KDTP	8 / 15
	South Mitrovica	71,909	Agim Bahtiri	VV	Bedri Hamza	PDK	14 / 35
	North Mitrovica	12,326	Milan Radojević	SL	Milan Radojević	SL	17 / 19
	Novo Brdo	6,729	Svetislav Ivanović	SL	Saša Milošević	SL	10 / 15
	Obiliq	21,549	Xhafer Gashi	Independent	Xhafer Gashi	Independent	9 / 21
	Rahovec	56,208	Smajl Latifi	AAK	Smajl Latifi	AAK	12 / 31
	Parteš	1,787	Dragan Petković	SL	Dragan Petković	SL	13 / 15
	Pejë	96,450	Gazmend Muhaxheri	LDK	Gazmend Muhaxheri	LDK	15 / 35
	Pristina	198,897	Shpend Ahmeti	Independent	Përparim Rama	LDK	14 / 51
	Prizren	177,781	Mytaher Haskuka	VV	Shaqir Totaj	PDK	11 / 41
	Podujevo	88,499	Shpejtim Bulliqi	VV	Shpejtim Bulliqi	VV	13 / 35
	Ranilug	3,866	Vladica Aritonović	SL	Katarina Ristić–Ilić	SL	15 / 15
	Skenderaj	50,858	Bekim Jashari	Independent	Fadil Nura	PDK	17 / 31
	Štrpce	6,949	Bratislav Nikolić	SL	Dalibor Jevtić	SL	10 / 15
	Shtime	27,324	Naim Ismajli	PDK	Qemajl Aliu	VV	8 / 21
	Suva Reka	59,722	Bali Muharremi	AAK	Bali Muharremi	AAK	12 / 31
	Viti	46,987	Sokol Haliti	LDK	Sokol Haliti	LDK	11 / 27
	Vushtrri	69,870	Xhafer Tahiri	LDK	Ferit Idrizi	PDK	11 / 35
	Zubin Potok	6,616	Srđan Vulović	SL	Srđan Vulović	SL	15 / 19
	Zvečan	7,481	Vučina Janković	SL	Dragiša Milović	SL	18 / 19

Party	Municipalities
Serb List	10 / 38
Democratic Party of Kosovo	8 / 38
Democratic League of Kosovo	8 / 38
Alliance for the Future of Kosovo	5 / 38
Vetëvendosje	4 / 38
Social Democratic Initiative	1 / 38
Turkish Democratic Party of Kosovo	1 / 38
Inciativa Qytetare për Obiliq	1 / 38

== Results of 1st round ==
Winner
Ballotage

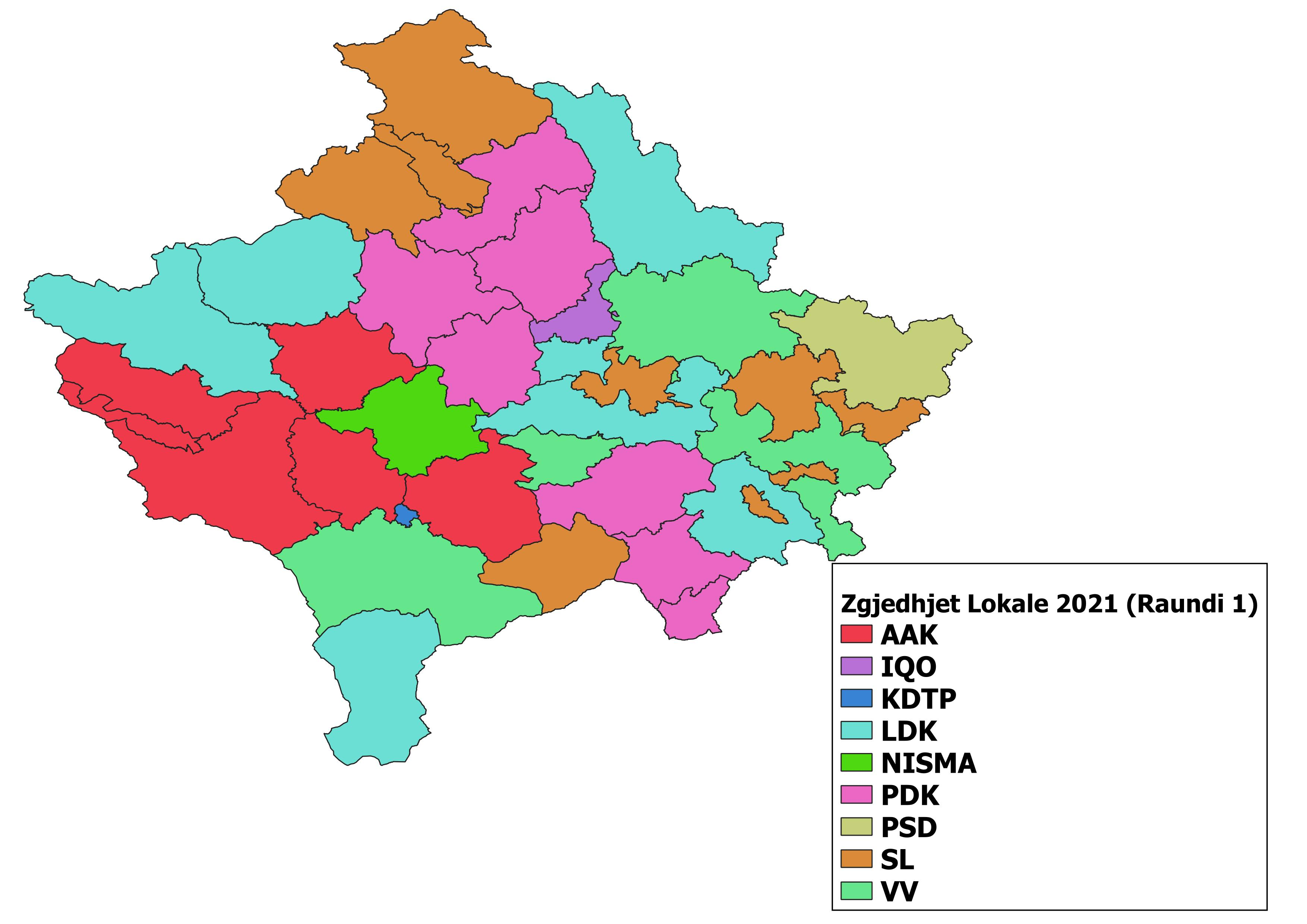
The results of round 1

=== Deçan ===
Mayoral results
Candidate	Party	Votes	%
Bashkim Ramosaj (incumbent)	Alliance for the Future of Kosovo	9,843	64.90
Hyri Dobrunaj	Democratic League of Kosovo	2,919	19.25
Orges Tafilaj	Levizja Vetëvendosje!	1,799	11.86
Isa Elezaj	Isa Elezaj	307	2.02
Ardiana Qorraj	Democratic Party of Kosovo	298	1.96
Total		15,166	100.00

Municipal assembly results
Party	Votes	%	Seats
Alliance for the Future of Kosovo	8,329	58.80	16
Democratic League of Kosovo	3,722	26.28	7
Levizja Vetëvendosje!	1,491	10.53	3
Democratic Party of Kosovo	437	3.09	1
National Front of Kosovo	186	1.31	–
Total	14,165	100.00	27

=== Dragash ===
Candidate for Mayor	Party	Result	Votes
Bexhet Xheladini	Democratic League of Kosovo	35.69%	4,887
Shaban Shabani	Democratic Party of Kosovo	32.56%	4,459
Kaltrina Salihu	Vetëvendosje	17.34%	2,375
Adnan Redžeplar	Vakat Coalition	11.63%	1,593
Agron Gashi	Alliance for the Future of Kosovo	2.05%	281
Xhevxhet Tahiri	Balli Kombëtar i Kosovës	0.72%	99

=== Ferizaj ===
Candidate for Mayor	Party	Result	Votes
Agim Aliu	Democratic Party of Kosovo	62.38%	30,627
Valon Ramadani	Vetëvendosje	26.05%	12,793
Sibel Halimi	Democratic League of Kosovo	9.34%	4,585
Arben Halili	Alliance for the Future of Kosovo	2.23%	1,096

=== Gjakova ===
Mayoral results (first round)
Candidate	Party	Votes	%
Ardian Gjini (incumbent)	Alliance for the Future of Kosovo	18,973	45.76
Mimoza Kusari Lila	The Alternative (endorsed by Levizja Vetëvendosje!)	15,426	37.20
Ferdinand Kolaj	Albanian Christian Democratic Party of Kosovo	2,837	6.84
Teki Shala	Democratic League of Kosovo	2,330	5.62
Arbënesha Kuqi	Democratic Party of Kosovo	1,377	3.32
Fazli Hoxha	Social Democratic Initiative	522	1.26
Total		41,465	100.00

Municipal assembly results
Party	Votes	%	Seats
Alliance for the Future of Kosovo	11,579	30.09	11
Levizja Vetëvendosje!	10,829	28.14	10
Democratic Party of Kosovo	4,911	12.76	5
Democratic League of Kosovo	4,648	12.08	4
Albanian Christian Democratic Party of Kosovo	4,366	11.35	4
Social Democratic Initiative	1,435	3.73	1
New Democratic Initiative of Kosovo	493	1.28	–
Justice Party	215	0.56	–
Total	38,476	100.00	35

=== Gjilan ===
Candidate for Mayor	Party	Result	Votes
Alban Hyseni	Vetëvendosje	44.71%	19,057
Lutfi Haziri	Democratic League of Kosovo	43.51%	18,546
Leonora Morina–Bunjaki	Democratic Party of Kosovo	8.25%	3,518
Nazim Gagica	Alliance for the Future of Kosovo	2.44%	1,042
Gani Neziri	independent candidate	0.59%	252
Lulzim Bexheti	independent candidate	0.48%	206

=== Drenas ===
Candidate for Mayor	Party	Result	Votes
Ramiz Lladrovci	Democratic Party of Kosovo	45.50%	10,419
Driton Ajazi	Demokratët për Drenasin	30.50%	6,984
Fejzi Kiqina	Vetëvendosje	17.10%	3,916
Xhavit Drenori	Iniciativa Qytetare Green për Drenas	4.16%	952
Arta Ahmeti-Xhylani	Alliance for the Future of Kosovo	1.79%	411
Anduena Gllareva	Democratic League of Kosovo	0.96%	219

=== Gračanica ===
Candidate for Mayor	Party	Result	Votes
Ljiljana Šubarić	SL	77.93%	6,506
Branimir Stojanović	independent candidate	22.07%	1,843

=== Hani i Elezit ===
Candidate for Mayor	Party	Result	Votes
Mehmet Ballazhi	PDK	51.33%	2,561
Rufki Suma	independent candidate	42.21%	2,106
Sherif Berisha	Vetëvendosje	6.45%	322

=== Fushë Kosova ===
Candidate for Mayor	Party	Result	Votes
Burim Berisha	Democratic League of Kosovo	49.72%	7,966
Enver Bajçinca	Vetëvendosje	25.58%	4,098
Rrahim Tërnava	Democratic Party of Kosovo	22.35%	3,580
Hasan Ismajli	Alliance for the Future of Kosovo	2.35%	377

=== Istog ===
Mayoral results (first round)
Candidate	Party	Votes	%
Ilir Ferati	Democratic League of Kosovo	7,974	41.09
Bekë Berisha	Alliance for the Future of Kosovo	5,140	26.49
Agron Avdijaj	Levizja Vetëvendosje!	4,528	23.34
Ali Nimanaj	Democratic Party of Kosovo	1,189	6.13
Idriz Blakaj	Civic Initiative "Together for Istog"	573	2.95
Total		19,404	100.00

Municipal assembly results
Party	Votes	%	Seats
Democratic League of Kosovo	7,101	39.07	11
Alliance for the Future of Kosovo	4,612	25.37	7
Levizja Vetëvendosje!	3,419	18.81	5
Democratic Party of Kosovo	1,794	9.87	3
Gibi	347	1.91	1
Civic Initiative "Together for Istog"	335	1.84	–
New Democratic Initiative of Kosovo	198	1.09	–
Serb List	196	1.08	–
Initiative of Bosniak Unity	154	0.85	–
Radoš Repanović	14	0.08	–
Dragan Repanović	7	0.04	–
Total	18,177	100.00	27

=== Junik ===
Mayoral results (first round)
Candidate	Party	Votes	%
Agron Kuçi (incumbent)	Alliance for the Future of Kosovo	1,419	45.19
Ruzhdi Shehu	Democratic League of Kosovo	1,319	42.01
Besart Tofaj	Levizja Vetëvendosje!	336	10.70
Fatos Shala	Democratic Party of Kosovo	66	2.10
Total		3,140	100.00

Municipal assembly results
Party	Votes	%	Seats
Alliance for the Future of Kosovo	1,251	42.08	6
Democratic League of Kosovo	1,164	39.15	6
Levizja Vetëvendosje!	488	16.41	3
Democratic Party of Kosovo	70	2.35	–
Total	2,973	100.00	15

=== Kaçanik ===
Candidate for Mayor	Party	Result	Votes
Besim Ilazi	Democratic Party of Kosovo	44.67%	7,111
Jeton Raka	Vetëvendosje	33.36%	5,311
Shkëlqim Jakupi	Democratic League of Kosovo	12.29%	1,957
Shukri Luta	independent candidate	7.27%	1,157
Kastriot Bushi	independent candidate	2.41%	384

=== Kamenicë ===
Candidate for Mayor	Party	Result	Votes
Qëndron Kastrati	Social Democratic Party	35.52%	5,408
Kadri Rahimaj	Vetëvendosje	31.01%	5,156
Muhamed Kallaba	Democratic Party of Kosovo	12.62%	2,098
Faton Jakupi	Alliance for the Future of Kosovo	12.48%	2,076
Jeton Biqkaj	Democratic League of Kosovo	10.27%	1,707
Albert Sermaxhaj	NISMA	1.11%	184

=== Klina ===
Mayoral results (first round)
Candidate	Party	Votes	%
Zenun Elezaj (incumbent)	Alliance for the Future of Kosovo	7,531	43.33
Esat Raci	Democratic Party of Kosovo	4,766	27.42
Besim Hoti	Democratic League of Kosovo	3,351	19.28
Lulzim Dragidella	Levizja Vetëvendosje!	1,734	9.98
Total		17,382	100.00

Municipal assembly results
Party	Votes	%	Seats
Alliance for the Future of Kosovo	6,518	39.86	11
Democratic Party of Kosovo	3,883	23.74	7
Democratic League of Kosovo	3,619	22.13	6
Levizja Vetëvendosje!	1,870	11.44	3
Albanian Christian Democratic Party of Kosovo	234	1.43	–
Serb List	158	0.97	–
New Kosovo Alliance	65	0.40	–
Bojan Saičić	6	0.04	–
Total	16,353	100.00	27

=== Klokot ===
Candidate for Mayor	Party	Result	Votes
Vladan Bogdanović	SL	41.01%	789
Strahinja Spasić	Gi Srpska Narodna Sloga	36.33%	699
Saša Mirković	Narodno Jedinstvo	22.66%	436

=== Leposavić ===
Mayoral results
Candidate	Party	Votes	%
Zoran Todić (incumbent)	Serb List	9,065	97.85
Shaqir Hetemi	Democratic Party of Kosovo	199	2.15
Total		9,264	100.00

Municipal assembly results
Party	Votes	%	Seats
Serb List	8,995	97.10	19
Democratic Party of Kosovo	172	1.86	–
Levizja Vetëvendosje!	97	1.05	–
Total	9,264	100.00	19

=== Lipjan ===
Candidate for Mayor	Party	Result	Votes
Imri Ahmeti	Democratic League of Kosovo	56.42%	15,541
Adnan Rrustemi	Vetëvendosje	23.36%	6,435
Hyzer Rizani	Democratic Party of Kosovo	18.88%	5,201
Bashkim Budakova	Alliance for the Future of Kosovo	1.34%	368

=== Malisheva ===
Candidate for Mayor	Party	Result	Votes
Ekrem Kastrati	NISMA	34.08%	7,548
Isni Kilaj	Democratic Party of Kosovo	28.82%	6,383
Bajrush Hoti	Democratic League of Kosovo	16.88%	3,738
Alban Krasniqi	Vetëvendosje	15.66%	3,469
Kastriot Berisha	Alliance for the Future of Kosovo	4.21%	933
Selajdin Bytyҫi	independent candidate	0.35%	78

=== Mamusha ===
Candidate for Mayor	Party	Result	Votes
Abdülhadi Krasniç	Turkish Democratic Party of Kosovo	48.92%	1,430
Arif Bütüç	Kosova Adalet Türk Partisi	36.95%	1,080
İlyas Bayraktar	independent candidate	12.59%	368
Riza Kruezi	Iniciativa Erdem	1.54%	45

=== Mitrovica ===
==== South Mitrovica ====
Mayoral results
Candidate	Party	Votes	%
Bedri Hamza	Democratic Party of Kosovo	16,566	53.69
Agim Bahtiri (incumbent)	Levizja Vetëvendosje!	10,654	34.53
Armend Agolli	Democratic League of Kosovo	3,636	11.78
Total		30,856	100.00

Municipal assembly results
Party	Votes	%	Seats
Democratic Party of Kosovo	11,104	39.20	14
Levizja Vetëvendosje!	8,647	30.52	11
Democratic League of Kosovo	4,680	16.52	6
Power of the Diaspora	1,041	3.67	1
New Kosovo Alliance	1,020	3.60	1
Justice Party	638	2.25	1
Alliance for the Future of Kosovo	564	1.99	1
Social Democratic Initiative	372	1.31	–
Turkish Democratic Party of Kosovo	215	0.76	–
Partia Ura	49	0.17	–
Total	28,330	100.00	35

==== North Mitrovica ====
Mayoral results
Candidate	Party	Votes	%
Milan Radojević (incumbent)	Serb List	10,833	91.12
Erden Atiq	Civic Initiative "Mitrovica"	1,056	8.88
Total		11,889	100.00

Municipal assembly results
Party	Votes	%	Seats
Serb List	10,148	89.17	17
Civic Initiative "Mitrovica"	1,023	8.99	2
Civic Initiative "Serbian Survival"	209	1.84	–
Total	11,380	100.00	19

=== Novo Brdo ===
Candidate for Mayor	Party	Result	Votes
Saša Milošević	SL	63.19%	3,548
Bajrush Ymeri	Democratic League of Kosovo	24.79%	1,392
Abdyl Gashi	Vetëvendosje	8.50%	477
Selatin Nuhiu	Democratic Party of Kosovo	3.53%	198

=== Obilić ===
Candidate for Mayor	Party	Result	Votes
Xhafer Gashi	Iniciativa Qytetare për Obiliq	48.12%	5,975
Halil Thaçi	Vetëvendosje	20.19%	2,507
Mehmet Krasniqi	Democratic League of Kosovo	9.52%	1,182
Goran Dančetović	SL	9.11%	1,131
Ajet Berisha	Lëvizja për Bashkim	7.43%	923
Xhelal Krasniqi	Alliance for the Future of Kosovo	3.17%	393
Hanefi Musliu	Democratic Party of Kosovo	2.46%	306

=== Rahovec ===
Mayoral results (first round)
Candidate	Party	Votes	%
Smajl Latifi (incumbent)	Alliance for the Future of Kosovo	10,144	47.18
Visar Korenica	Levizja Vetëvendosje!	5,341	24.84
Burim Krasniqi	Democratic League of Kosovo	3,424	15.92
Bejtullah Deliu	Democratic Party of Kosovo	2,418	11.25
Xhafer Bytyqi	Xhafer Bytyqi	174	0.81
Total		21,501	100.00

Municipal assembly results
Party	Votes	%	Seats
Alliance for the Future of Kosovo	8,103	39.83	12
Levizja Vetëvendosje!	4,471	21.98	7
Democratic League of Kosovo	3,903	19.19	6
Democratic Party of Kosovo	3,594	17.67	6
Serb List	272	1.34	–
Total	20,343	100.00	31

=== Parteš ===
Candidate for Mayor	Party	Result	Votes
Dragan Petković	SL	75.35%	1,684
Nenad Cvetković	Narodna Sloga	21.25%	475
Jugoslav Jovanović	independent candidate	3.40%	76

=== Peja ===
Mayoral results
Candidate	Party	Votes	%
Gazmend Muhaxheri (incumbent)	Democratic League of Kosovo	23,426	60.49
Gazmend Agusholli	Levizja Vetëvendosje!	8,643	22.32
Rrustem Berisha	Alliance for the Future of Kosovo	6,328	16.34
Gani Veselaj	Gani Veselaj	124	0.32
Kreshnik Husaj	Democratic Party of Unity	120	0.31
Drena Podrimçaku	Partia Balliste	89	0.23
Total		38,730	100.00

Municipal assembly results
Party	Votes	%	Seats
Democratic League of Kosovo	16,045	43.37	15
Alliance for the Future of Kosovo	6,958	18.81	7
Levizja Vetëvendosje!	6,921	18.71	7
Democratic Party of Kosovo	4,789	12.94	4
Bosniak Initiative of Peć	740	2.00	1
Initiative of Bosniak Unity	533	1.44	1
Egyptian Liberal Party	514	1.39	–
Serb List	410	1.11	–
Democratic Party of Unity	69	0.19	–
Partia Balliste	20	0.05	–
Total	36,999	100.00	35

=== Prishtina ===
Candidate for Mayor	Party	Result	Votes
Arben Vitia	Vetëvendosje	42.54%	36,818
Përparim Rama	Democratic League of Kosovo	29.17%	25,252
Uran Ismaili	Democratic Party of Kosovo	21.69%	18,771
Daut Haradinaj	Alliance for the Future of Kosovo	4.48%	3,874
Gëzim Mehmeti	New Kosovo Alliance	1.83%	1,588
Avni Çakmaku	Fjala	0.18%	155
Florim Isufi	Partia Balliste	0.12%	100

=== Prizren ===
Candidate for Mayor	Party	Result	Votes
Mytaher Haskuka	Vetëvendosje	40.41%	24,378
Shaqir Totaj	Democratic Party of Kosovo	31.36%	18,919
Anton Quni	Democratic League of Kosovo	14.99%	9,043
Zafir Berisha	Social Democratic Initiative	5.72%	3,452
Lulzim Kabashi	Alliance for the Future of Kosovo	3.62%	2,182
Ćemailj Smailji	Nova Demokratska Stranka	2.88%	1.736
Afrim Tejeci	New Kosovo Alliance	0.76%	459
Milazim Lushaj	independent candidate	0.25%	153

=== Podujevë ===
Candidate for Mayor	Party	Result	Votes
Ekrem Hyseni	Democratic League of Kosovo	44,20%	16,925
Shpejtim Bulliqi	Vetëvendosje	44.16%	16,907
Floretë Zejnullahu	Democratic Party of Kosovo	6.45%	2,471
Besnik Tahiri	Alliance for the Future of Kosovo	4.00%	1,531
Gazmend Islami	Organizata Balli Kombëtar Demokratë	0.66%	251
Xhemajl Hasani	Social Democratic Initiative	0.54%	205

=== Ranilug ===
Candidate for Mayor	Party	Result	Votes
Katarina Ristić–Ilić	SL	100%	2,427

=== Skenderaj ===
Mayoral results
Candidate	Party	Votes	%
Fadil Nura	Democratic Party of Kosovo	13,123	57.89
Bekim Jashari (incumbent)	Independent List Bekim Jashari	9,236	40.74
Sokol Haliti	Civic Initiative "For Skenderaj"	311	1.37
Total		22,670	100.00

Municipal assembly results
Party	Votes	%	Seats
Democratic Party of Kosovo	11,412	54.04	17
Independent List Bekim Jashari	6,672	31.59	10
Levizja Vetëvendosje!	1,183	5.60	2
Alliance for the Future of Kosovo	392	1.86	1
Social Democratic Initiative	356	1.69	1
Civic Initiative "For Skenderaj"	229	1.08	–
Civic Initiative "Progress for Skenderaj"	220	1.04	–
New Kosovo Alliance	206	0.98	–
Democratic League of Kosovo	206	0.98	–
Serb List	126	0.60	–
The Word	69	0.33	–
Hamdi Malaj	47	0.22	–
Total	21,118	100.00	31

=== Štrpce ===
Candidate for Mayor	Party	Result	Votes
Dalibor Jevtić	SL	59.70%	4,148
Slaviša Vasiljević	Gi Sloboda Štrpce	16.02%	1,113
Fikrih Hasani	Bashkë për Shtërpcën	12.77%	887
Besim Islami	Vetëvendosje	11.51%	800

=== Shtime ===
Candidate for Mayor	Party	Result	Votes
Qemajl Aliu	Vetëvendosje	45.29%	5,964
Naim Ismajli	Democratic Party of Kosovo	44.23%	5,824
Bedri Zeqiri	Democratic League of Kosovo	10.49%	1,381

=== Suhareka ===
Candidate for Mayor	Party	Result	Votes
Bali Muharremaj	Alliance for the Future of Kosovo	51.30%	14,483
Ardian Shala	Democratic League of Kosovo	30.57%	8,629
Salih Zyba	Vetëvendosje	9.53%	2,690
Murtez Zekolli	Democratic Party of Kosovo	8.60%	2,428

=== Vitia ===
Candidate for Mayor	Party	Result	Votes
Sokol Haliti	Democratic League of Kosovo	41.30%	8,326
Arsim Ademi	Vetëvendosje	34.50%	6.955
Bekim Azizi	Democratic Party of Kosovo	24.20%	4,879

=== Vushtrri ===
Mayoral results (first round)
Candidate	Party	Votes	%
Ferit Idrizi	Democratic Party of Kosovo	10,247	34.81
Xhafer Tahiri (incumbent)	Democratic League of Kosovo	9,956	33.82
Arsim Rexhepi	Levizja Vetëvendosje!	7,667	26.04
Mensut Ademi	Alliance for the Future of Kosovo	565	1.92
Ergin Sunguri	Turkish Democratic Party of Kosovo	436	1.48
Albert Maxhuni	Social Democratic Initiative	322	1.09
Jeton Salihu	Independent candidate	245	0.83
Total		29,438	100.00

Municipal assembly results
Party	Votes	%	Seats
Democratic Party of Kosovo	8,687	31.33	11
Democratic League of Kosovo	8,615	31.07	11
Levizja Vetëvendosje!	6,845	24.69	9
Alliance for the Future of Kosovo	1,186	4.28	1
Serb List	846	3.05	1
Movement for Unification	665	2.40	1
Social Democratic Initiative	566	2.04	1
Turkish Democratic Party of Kosovo	315	1.14	–
Total	27,725	100.00	35

=== Zubin Potok ===
Mayoral results
Candidate	Party	Votes	%
Srđan Vulović (incumbent)	Serb List	3,225	83.53
Slaviša Biševac	Civic Initiative "Zubin Potok"	377	9.76
Qerkin Veseli	Democratic League of Kosovo	259	6.71
Total		3,861	100.00

Municipal assembly results
Party	Votes	%	Seats
Serb List	3,144	81.54	15
Levizja Vetëvendosje!	262	6.79	1
Civic Initiative "Zubin Potok"	176	4.56	1
Democratic League of Kosovo	161	4.18	1
Democratic Party of Kosovo	113	2.93	1
Total	3,856	100.00	19

=== Zvečan ===
Mayoral results
Candidate	Party	Votes	%
Dragiša Milović	Serb List	5,394	98.43
Slađana Pantović	independent candidate	86	1.57
Total		5,480	100.00

Municipal assembly results
Party	Votes	%	Seats
Serb List	5,388	96.04	18
Democratic Party of Kosovo	156	2.78	1
Slađana Pantović	35	0.62	–
Levizja Vetëvendosje!	31	0.55	–
Total	5,610	100.00	19

== Results of 2nd round ==
Winner

=== Dragash ===
Candidate for Mayor	Party	Result	Votes
Shaban Shabani	Democratic Party of Kosovo	50.21%	5,648
Bexhet Xheladini	Democratic League of Kosovo	49.79%	5,601

=== Gjakova ===
Mayoral results (second round)
Candidate	Party	Votes	%
Ardian Gjini (incumbent)	Alliance for the Future of Kosovo	20,796	55.97
Mimoza Kusari Lila	The Alternative (endorsed by Levizja Vetëvendosje!)	16,358	44.03
Total		37,154	100.00

=== Gjilan ===
Candidate for Mayor	Party	Result	Votes
Alban Hyseni	Vetëvendosje	51.01%	21,800
Lutfi Haziri	Democratic League of Kosovo	48.90%	20,865

=== Drenas ===
Candidate for Mayor	Party	Result	Votes
Ramiz Lladrovci	Democratic Party of Kosovo	54.16%	11,904
Driton Ajazi	Demokratët për Drenasin	45.84%	10,076

=== Istog ===
Mayoral results (second round)
Candidate	Party	Votes	%
Ilir Ferati	Democratic League of Kosovo	9,700	56.16
Bekë Berisha	Alliance for the Future of Kosovo	7,573	43.84
Total		17,273	100.00

=== Junik ===
Mayoral results (second round)
Candidate	Party	Votes	%
Ruzhdi Shehu	Democratic League of Kosovo	1,658	53.80
Agron Kuçi (incumbent)	Alliance for the Future of Kosovo	1,424	46.20
Total		3,082	100.00

=== Kaçanik ===
Candidate for Mayor	Party	Result	Votes
Besim Ilazi	Democratic Party of Kosovo	53.91%	7,373
Jeton Raka	Vetëvendosje	46.09%	6,304

=== Kamenicë ===
Candidate for Mayor	Party	Result	Votes
Kadri Rahimaj	Vetëvendosje	53.34%	8,248
Qëndron Kastrati	Social Democratic Party	46.66%	7,248

=== Klina ===
Mayoral results (second round)
Candidate	Party	Votes	%
Zenun Elezaj (incumbent)	Alliance for the Future of Kosovo	7,974	55.16
Esat Raci	Democratic Party of Kosovo	6,483	44.84
Total		14,457	100.00

=== Klokot ===
Candidate for Mayor	Party	Result	Votes
Vladan Bogdanović	SL	55.12%	1,029
Strahinja Spasić	Gi Srpska Narodna Sloga	44,88%	838

=== Fushë Kosova ===
Candidate for Mayor	Party	Result	Votes
Burim Berisha	Democratic League of Kosovo	65.45%	7,978
Enver Bajçinca	Vetëvendosje	34.55%	4,212

=== Malishevë ===
Candidate for Mayor	Party	Result	Votes
Ekrem Kastrati	NISMA	53.10%	10,572
Isni Kilaj	Democratic Party of Kosovo	46.90%	9,337

=== Mamuša ===
Candidate for Mayor	Party	Result	Votes
Abdülhadi Krasniç	Turkish Democratic Party of Kosovo	63.19%	1,629
Arif Bütüç	Kosova Adalet Türk Partisi	36.81%	949

=== Obilić ===
Candidate for Mayor	Party	Result	Votes
Xhafer Gashi	Iniciativa Qytetare për Obiliq	61.30%	6,522
Halil Thaçi	Vetëvendosje	38.70%	4,117

=== Rahovec ===
Mayoral results (second round)
Candidate	Party	Votes	%
Smajl Latifi (incumbent)	Alliance for the Future of Kosovo	11,575	65.19
Visar Korenica	Levizja Vetëvendosje!	6,180	34.81
Total		17,755	100.00

=== Prishtina ===
Candidate for Mayor	Party	Result	Votes
Përparim Rama	Democratic League of Kosovo	50.98%	41,746
Arben Vitia	Vetëvendosje	49.02%	40,143

=== Prizren ===
Candidate for Mayor	Party	Result	Votes
Shaqir Totaj	Democratic Party of Kosovo	50.93%	27,689
Mytaher Haskuka	Vetëvendosje	49.07%	26,680

=== Podujevë ===
Candidate for Mayor	Party	Result	Votes
Shpejtim Bulliqi	Vetëvendosje	52.06%	20,788
Ekrem Hyseni	Democratic League of Kosovo	47.94%	19,141

=== Shtime ===
Candidate for Mayor	Party	Result	Votes
Qemajl Aliu	Vetëvendosje	50.67%	7,029
Naim Ismajli	Democratic Party of Kosovo	49.33%	6,844

=== Vitia ===
Candidate for Mayor	Party	Result	Votes
Sokol Haliti	Democratic League of Kosovo	51.44%	8,797
Arsim Ademi	Vetëvendosje	48.56%	8,303

=== Vushtrri ===
Mayoral results (second round)
Candidate	Party	Votes	%
Ferit Idrizi	Democratic Party of Kosovo	13,414	53.19
Xhafer Tahiri (incumbent)	Democratic League of Kosovo	11,806	46.81
Total		25,220	100.00

== Opinion polls ==
=== Gjakova ===
Pollster	Date	LVV	LDK	AAK	PDK	Other	Abstention	Lead
Albanian Post	10 October	34.3	7.1	50.7	2.9	5.7	–	16.4
UBO Consulting	4–8 October	33.2	3.6	59.0	1.5	–	2.5	25.8

=== Gjilan ===
Pollster	Date	LVV	LDK	AAK	PDK	Other	Abstention	Lead
UBO Consulting	21–28 September	43.0	50.9	1.9	3.7	–	0.7	7.9

=== Istog ===
Pollster	Date	LVV	LDK	AAK	PDK	Other	Abstention	Lead
UBO Consulting	21–26 September	24.3	43.2	24.7	4.6	–	–	18.5

=== Peja ===
Pollster	Date	LVV	LDK	AAK	Other	Abstention	Lead
UBO Consulting	29 September–4 October	18.7	64.8	16.0	0.5	–	46.1

=== Prizren ===
Pollster	Date	LVV	LDK	AAK	PDK	Other	Abstention	Lead
Albanian Post	11 October	42.7	8.4	2.3	17.6	–	25.9	25.1

=== Vushtrria ===
Pollster	Date	LVV	LDK	AAK	PDK	Other	Abstention	Lead
UBO Consulting	27 September – 3 October	31.8	42.4	1.0	23.9	1	–	10.6
