= Arsim Rexhepi =

Kosov politician (born 1972)

Arsim Rexhepi (born 20 May 1972) is a politician in Kosovo. He served in the Assembly of Kosovo from 2007 to 2011, initially as a member of the New Kosovo Alliance (AKR) and later with the Democratic League of Kosovo (LDK). He is now a member of Vetëvendosje (VV).

== Early life and career ==
Rexhepi was born to an Albanian family in Vushtrri, in what was then the Socialist Autonomous Province of Kosovo in the Socialist Republic of Serbia, Socialist Federal Republic of Yugoslavia. He studied at the Faculty of Albanian Architecture and Literature at the University of Pristina (presumably in this context meaning the 1990s parallel institution) and took doctoral studies at Ruhr University Bochum in Germany. Rexhepi has lectured in literature at the Bochum and Dortmund universities and has taught German, philosophy, and social studies at the Montessori Gesamtschule in Sendenhorst. He has published widely in his field.

== Politician ==
Rexhepi became a vice-president of the AKR in 2006 and appeared in the seventh position on the party's electoral list in the 2007 Kosovan parliamentary election. Parliamentary elections in Kosovo are held under open list proportional representation; he finished in seventh place among the party's candidates and was elected when the list won thirteen mandates. The AKR served in opposition. In February 2008, the assembly membership and Kosovo's political leadership unilaterally declared independence as the Republic of Kosovo.

Rexhepi left the AKR later in 2008 and initially served as an independent. The following year, he joined the LDK, which was then part of Kosovo's coalition government. Rexhepi chaired the assembly committee on education, science, technology, culture, youth, and sports, and was also the chair of Kosovo's friendship group with Germany. A 2009 media report identified him as one of the most active members of the legislature.

In late 2009, Rexhepi introduced a motion to investigate the finances of Radio Television of Kosovo (RTK). The motion was not approved by the assembly. He was not a candidate in the 2010 assembly election.

Rexhepi joined Vetëvendosje in October 2018. He was included on the party's list in the 2019 parliamentary election but received the fewest votes of any VV candidate and was not elected. He was later the party's candidate for mayor of Vushtrri in the 2021 Kosovan local elections and finished third.

== Electoral record ==
=== Local (Vushtrri) ===
2021 Kosovan local elections: Mayor of Vushtrri
Candidate	Party	First round		Second round	
Candidate	Party	Votes	%	Votes	%
Ferit Idrizi	Democratic Party of Kosovo	10,247	34.81	13,414	53.19
Xhafer Tahiri (incumbent)	Democratic League of Kosovo	9,956	33.82	11,806	46.81
Arsim Rexhepi	Levizja Vetëvendosje!	7,667	26.04		
Mensut Ademi	Alliance for the Future of Kosovo	565	1.92		
Ergin Sunguri	Turkish Democratic Party of Kosovo	436	1.48		
Albert Maxhuni	Social Democratic Initiative	322	1.09		
Jeton Salihu	Independent candidate	245	0.83		
Total		29,438	100.00	25,220	100.00
