= Srđan Vulović =

Kosovo Serb politician

Srđan Vulović (Serbian Cyrillic: Срђан Вуловић; born 1965) is a Kosovo Serb politician. He was a member of the National Assembly of Serbia from 1997 to 2001 and has served multiple terms as mayor of Zubin Potok. Vulović is a member of the Serb List (SL) political party.

Vulović resigned as mayor of Zubin Potok in November 2022, amid the backdrop of a Serb List boycott of the Republic of Kosovo's political institutions. The Serbian government continues to recognize him as leader of a provisional municipal authority.

== Private career ==
Vulović is a graduated transportation engineer. He has overseen the Belgrade-based company Ibar, which manages energy production on Gazivoda Lake, an artificial lake that produces cooling water for two coal plants essential for Kosovo's electricity needs. Ownership of the lake and its resources are disputed between Serbia and the Republic of Kosovo; Vulović contends that Serbia has the right to manage the lake.

== Politician ==
=== Parliamentarian ===
Vulović received the fourth position on a coalition electoral list led by the Socialist Party of Serbia (SPS) for the Kosovska Mitrovica division in the 1997 Serbian parliamentary election. The list won five out of seven seats, and Vulović was included in the SPS's delegation when the assembly convened in December 1997. (From 1992 to 2000, Serbia's electoral law stipulated that one-third of parliamentary mandates would be assigned to candidates from successful lists in numerical order, while the remaining two-thirds would be distributed amongst other candidates on the lists by the sponsoring parties. It was common practice for the latter mandates to be awarded out of order. Vulović's list position did not give him the automatic right to a mandate.) The SPS and its allies won the election, and Vulović served as a supporter of the administration.

Serbia's electoral laws were reformed after the fall of Slobodan Milošević's government in October 2000, such that the entire country became a single electoral division and all mandates were awarded to candidates on successful lists at the discretion of the sponsoring parties or coalitions, irrespective of numerical order. Vulović appeared in the twenty-eighth position on the Socialist Party's mostly alphabetical list in the 2000 Serbian parliamentary election, which was held in December of that year. The list won thirty-seven seats, and he was not selected for a mandate. His term ended when the new assembly convened in January 2001.

=== Local politics ===
==== Early years ====
Vulović was identified in a December 2000 news report as chair of the Zubin Potok municipal assembly, a position that was at the time equivalent to mayor. In this capacity, he helped to facilitate the distribution of voting materials to Kosovo Serb communities in the 2000 parliamentary election. He was replaced as mayor by Slaviša Ristić in 2001.

Like most Kosovo Serb politicians, Vulović strongly opposes Kosovo's 2008 declaration of independence and considers Kosovo to be the sovereign territory of Serbia. In 2008, he said that Kosovo Serb communities would not permit Republic of Kosovo authorities to re-establish checkpoints on Kosovo's northern border. He added that Kosovo Serbs would continue co-operating with the United Nations Interim Administration Mission in Kosovo (UNMIK) and Kosovo Force (KFOR), in accordance with United Nations Security Council Resolution 1244.

==== Return as mayor of Zubin Potok ====
The governments of Serbia and the Republic of Kosovo partially normalized their relations under the 2013 Brussels Agreement, which did not address the status of Kosovo. Following the agreement, the Serbian government encouraged Kosovo Serbs to participate in Priština's governing institutions while also appointing its own provisional municipal authorities throughout Kosovo. The latter authorities have never been recognized by the Republic of Kosovo, which considers them as illegitimate.

In November 2018, the mayors of four predominantly Serb municipalities in the north of Kosovo resigned in protest against the Republic of Kosovo government's imposition of a one hundred per cent tax on goods from Serbia. In Zubin Potok, Stevan Vulović resigned as both mayor (recognized by Priština) and leader of the provisional authority (recognized by Belgrade). Srđan Vulović was appointed as leader of the provisional authority in late 2018. He also ran as the candidate of the Serb List in the subsequent mayoral by-election; describing the vote as "a referendum on how much the state of Serbia will be present here," he called for a high turnout. The outcome was never in any serious doubt, and he was elected in a landslide on 19 May 2019.

Shortly after his election, Vulović criticized the Kosovo Police for making an incursion into Zubin Potok under the auspices of anti-smuggling campaign. He contended that the people arrested had no connections to the underground economy and that the police had causes significant property damage through their actions. In April 2021, he signed a twinning agreement between Zubin Potok and Gradiška in the Republika Srpska, Bosnia and Herzegovina. He was re-elected, again without any serious opposition, in the 2021 Kosovan local elections.

The Serb List began boycotting the Republic of Kosovo's political institutions in November 2022, against the backdrop of the ongoing North Kosovo crisis. Vulović resigned as mayor on 6 November 2022. The Serbian government continues to recognize him as leader of a provisional authority in the municipality.

== Electoral record ==
=== Local (Zubin Potok) ===
2021 Kosovan local elections: Mayor of Zubin Potok
Candidate	Party	Votes	%
Srđan Vulović (incumbent)	Serb List	3,225	83.53
Slaviša Biševac	Civic Initiative "Zubin Potok"	377	9.76
Qerkin Veseli	Democratic League of Kosovo	259	6.71
Total		3,861	100.00

2019 Kosovan local elections: Mayor of Zubin Potok
Candidate	Party	Votes	%
Srđan Vulović	Serb List	4,075	94.59
Hysen Mehmeti	Democratic Party of Kosovo	123	2.86
Liridona Kahrimani	Levizja Vetëvendosje!	110	2.55
Total		4,308	100.00
