= Besim Muzaqi =

Kosovan politician

Besim Muzaqi (born 5 December 1979) is a politician in Kosovo. He was the deputy mayor of Vushtrri from 2017 to 2021 and has been a member of the Assembly of the Republic of Kosovo since 2021. Muzaqi is a member of Vetëvendosje (VV).

== Early life and private career ==
Muzaqi was born to a Kosovo Albanian family in Mitrovica in what was then the Socialist Autonomous Province of Kosovo in the Socialist Republic of Serbia, Socialist Federal Republic of Yugoslavia. Raised in Vushtrri, he graduated with a master's degree from the University of Pristina's Faculty of Pharmacy, later earning a second master's degree in Food Engineering and Technology (2014). Muzaqi has served as president of the Kosovo Pharmaceutical Association.

== Politician ==
Muzaqi joined Vetëvendosje in 2010 and has served on the party's presidency. He was included on the party's electoral list for the Vushtrri municipal assembly in the 2013 Kosovan local elections and its list for the Republic of Kosovo assembly in 2014 Kosovan parliamentary election, although he was not elected on either occasion. (Note: Muzaqi appeared in the fourth position on the Vetëvendosje list for Vushtrri in the 2013 election. Both municipal and parliamentary elections in the Republic of Kosovo are held under open list proportional representation. He received the ninth most votes of the party's candidates. The list won three seats and he was not elected.) (Note: In the 2014 assembly election, Muzaqi was given the fifty-eighth position on the Vetëvendosje list and placed fifty-first among the party's candidates. The list won sixteen seats, and he was not elected.)

He was Vetëvendosje's candidate for mayor of Vushtrri in the 2017 Kosovan local elections and finished third. His party participated in a local coalition government after the election, and he was appointed as the municipality's deputy mayor in December 2017. He ran for the Kosovo assembly again in the 2019 parliamentary election and was again not elected. (Note: In 2019, Muzaqi was given the forty-ninth position on the party's list and finished in fifty-fifth place among its candidates. The list won twenty-nine seats, and he was not elected.)

=== Parliamentarian ===
Muzaqi was given the thirty-second position on Vetëvendosje's list in the 2021 parliamentary election. Parliamentary elections in Kosovo are held under open list proportional representation; Muzaqi finished in fifty-fifth place among the party's candidates and was elected when the list won fifty-eight mandates. Vetëvendosje won a significant victory overall and afterward became the dominant presence in the Republic of Kosovo's coalition government. Muzaqi serves as a supporter of the administration and is a member of the committee on public administration, local government, media, and regional development.

== Electoral record ==
=== Local (Vushtrri) ===
2017 Kosovan local elections: Mayor of Vushtrri
Candidate	Party	First round		Second round	
Candidate	Party	Votes	%	Votes	%
Xhafer Tahiri	Democratic League of Kosovo	7,842	25.64	15,122	54.24
Ferit Idrizi	Democratic Party of Kosovo	10,184	33.29	12,758	45.76
Besim Muzaqi	Levizja Vetëvendosje!	7,679	25.10		
Nasuf Aliu	New Kosovo Alliance	2,442	7.98		
Lutfi Bilalli	Alliance for the Future of Kosovo	1,591	5.20		
Abdullah Vojvoda	Initiative for Kosovo	852	2.79		
Total		30,590	100.00	27,880	100.00
