= Shaqir Totaj =

Mayor of Prizren since 2021

Mayor of Prizren
- Incumbent
- Assumed office 6 December 2021
- Preceded by: Mytaher Haskuka

Vice President of the Democratic Party of Kosovo
- Preceded by: Agim Aliu
- Succeeded by: Vlora Çitaku

Personal details
- Born: 24 December 1960 (age 65) Prizren, SR Serbia, SFR Yugoslavia (now Kosovo)
- Party: Democratic Party of Kosovo
- Education: University of Washington; University of Prishtina

Shaqir Totaj is a Kosovo-Albanian conservative politician currently serving as Mayor of Prizren. Totaj was elected mayor in 2021 and belongs to the center-right PDK party.

== Early life and education ==
Shaqir Totaj was born on 24 December 1960 in Prizren, in the then Kosovo which was part of Socialist Yugoslavia. He finished high school in Prizren and went on to graduate from the University of Prishtina Economics Faculty. During his tenure as head of the Prizren branch of the KTA (Kosovo Tax Administration), he was part of the year long Hubert Humphrey Fellowship at the University of Washington with the support of the American Embassy, his study was in the field of "Management and Leadership of the Public Sector".

== Political career ==
Shaqir Totaj was the PDK's candidate for the 2017 election for the Mayor of Prizren. He managed to gain the most votes in the first round but lost the second round to LVV candidate Mytaher Haskuka with the difference between them being less than 400 votes.

In the 2021 local elections, he was once again the candidate for Mayor of Prizren. He came second in the first round of votes and went into a rematch against Mytaher Haskuka. During the campaign for the second round he was endorsed by AAK, NISMA, and AKR against the LVV candidate. He won in the second round against Haskuka, gaining roughly 51% of the vote. After the votes were counted, Haskuka accused the Democratic Party of vote buying, but the Supreme Court ruled in favor of the Democratic Party, and Totaj was reconfirmed as the winner of the race. Following his victory he created a coalition with AAK, and NISMA in the Prizren local assembly.

Totaj also served as Vice President of the Democratic Party but was later replaced in 2021 in favor of Vlora Çitaku.

== Personal life ==
Shaqir Totaj was the former leader of the local basketball club in Prizren "Bashkimi". During his time as leader, the club participated in international competitions. Shaqir Totaj is also the vice president of the Kosovan Basketball Federation.

Totaj's native language is Albanian, but he also speaks English, Serbo-Croatian, and Turkish.
