= Ilir Ferati =

Politician in Kosovo

Ilir Ferati (born 19 December 1988) is a politician in Kosovo. He served in the Assembly of the Republic of Kosovo from 2019 to 2021 and has been the mayor of Istog since 2021. Ferati is a member of the Democratic League of Kosovo (LDK).

He is the son of Fadil Ferati, who served as mayor of Istog from 2001 until his death in 2010.

== Early life and private career ==
Ferati was born to a Kosovo Albanian family in Istog, in what was then the Socialist Autonomous Province of Kosovo in the Socialist Republic of Serbia, Socialist Federal Republic of Yugoslavia. He was raised in the community and later graduated from the American University in Kosovo in public policy and management. After graduating, he worked for four years as a civil servant in Istog's directorate for economic development; his portfolio including working on grants for mountain tourism.

== Politician ==
=== Parliamentarian ===
Ferati was included in the fifty-fifth position on the LDK's electoral list in the 2019 Kosovan parliamentary election. Parliamentary elections in Kosovo are held under open list proportional representation; he finished in twenty-second place among the list's candidates and was elected when the list won twenty-eight seats. The LDK became part of the Republic of Kosovo's coalition government after the election, and Ferati served as a supporter of the administration. He was a member of the committee for infrastructure, agriculture, and environment, and a member of the investigative committee for managing the COVID-19 pandemic. He was also responsible for removing a requirement that civil service applicants have two years work experience to be employed in public institutions; the change was meant to ensure recent graduates would be able to enter the field.

Ferati finished in twenty-first place among the LDK list's candidates in the 2021 parliamentary election. The party fell to fifteen seats and he was not re-elected.

=== Mayor of Istog ===
Ferati was the LDK's candidate for mayor of Istog in the 2021 Kosovan local elections and was elected in the second round of voting. After the election, he made an agreement with the Democratic Party of Kosovo (PDK) for a four-year coalition government in the municipality.

== Electoral record ==
=== Local (Istog) ===
2021 Kosovan local elections: Mayor of Istog
Candidate	Party	First round		Second round	
Candidate	Party	Votes	%	Votes	%
Ilir Ferati	Democratic League of Kosovo	7,974	41.09	9,700	56.16
Bekë Berisha	Alliance for the Future of Kosovo	5,140	26.49	7,573	43.84
Agron Avdijaj	Levizja Vetëvendosje!	4,528	23.34		
Ali Nimanaj	Democratic Party of Kosovo	1,189	6.13		
Idriz Blakaj	Civic Initiative "Together for Istog"	573	2.95		
Total		19,404	100.00	17,273	100.00
