= Serb Democracy =

Political party in Kosovo

Serb Democracy Српска демократија Srpska demokratija Demokracia Serbe
- Abbreviation: SD
- President: Aleksandar Arsenijević
- Founded: 5 November 2023
- Headquarters: North Mitrovica
- Ideology: Serb minority politics
- Assembly: 0 / 120
- Mayors: 0 / 38
- Municipal assemblies: 0 / 994

Party flag

Website
- srpskademokratija.org

Serb Democracy (Serbian: Српска демократија, romanized: Srpska demokratija, Albanian: Demokracia Serbe, abbr. SD) is a Serb minority political party in Kosovo. It acts as opposition to the Serb List and is led by Aleksandar Arsenijević.

== History ==
Serb Democracy was preceded by Civic Initiate "Serbian Survival" which was led by activist Aleksandar Arsenijević. SD was founded on 5 November 2023 and Arsenijević was elected its first president. Ivan Orlović, Valentina Ćerković, Marinko Anđelković and Stefan Veljković were elected members of the presidency. The party was officially registered by the Central Electoral Commission of Kosovo on 6 December 2023.

Serb Democracy criticizes the Serb List and its representatives, as well as the Kosovan authorities.

== Election results ==
=== Parliamentary elections ===
Assembly of Kosovo
| Year | Popular vote | % of vote | Overall seats won | Serb seats | +/– | Government |
|---|---|---|---|---|---|---|
| Feb 2025 | 3,982 | 0.37% | 0 / 120 | 0 / 10 | New | Extra-parliamentary |
