= Bekë Berisha =

Kosovo politician

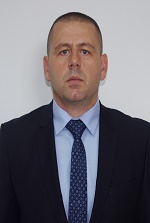
Bekë Berisha

Bekë Berisha (born 14 August 1978) is a politician in Kosovo. He has served in the Assembly of the Republic of Kosovo since 2017 as a member of the Alliance for the Future of Kosovo (AAK).

== Early life and private career ==
Berisha was born in the village of Staradran in the municipality of Istog of Kosovo. He is a lawyer.

Berisha projects a "larger than life" persona and has been profiled in the Kosovan media for his love of sports, his habit of swimming in icy waters, and his prodigious consumption of coffee. His 2019 declaration of assets revealed that he has significant wealth.

== Politician ==
=== Municipal politician (2007–13) ===
Berisha began his political career at the municipal level in Istog, appearing in the eleventh position on the AAK's electoral list in the 2007 Kosovan local elections. Assembly elections in Kosovo are held under open list proportional representation; the list won four seats, and Berisha was elected when he received the second-highest number of votes of any party candidate. He was promoted to the lead position on the AAK's list for Istog in the 2009 local elections and was re-elected when the list won six seats. He did not seek re-election in 2013.

=== Assembly of the Republic of Kosovo ===
==== Early candidacies (2010, 2014) ====
Berisha came close to being elected to the Assembly of the Republic of Kosovo in both the 2010 and 2014 parliamentary elections. On the former occasion, he finished eleventh amongst the party's candidates; the AAK won twelve seats in total, but a requirement for one-third female representation prevented him from receiving a mandate. Although he was the second-highest ranked candidate for a replacement mandate, he was unable to enter the assembly before its dissolution in 2014. In 2014, he finished in fifteenth place and was not elected when the AAK won eleven seats.

==== Parliamentarian (2017–present) ====
The AAK contested the 2017 Kosovan election in an alliance with the Democratic Party of Kosovo (PDK) and other parties called the PAN coalition. Berisha finished in thirty-seventh place among the list's candidates; the list won thirty-nine seats, and for the second time he missed direct election due to the requirement for one-third female representation. The PDK and AAK formed a coalition government after the election, and Berisha was awarded a mandate in September 2017 to replace Pal Lekaj, who had resigned to take a ministerial position. In his first assembly term, Berisha served on the commission for the supervision of the Kosovo Intelligence Agency (KIA).

Berisha was re-elected in the 2019 parliamentary election, finishing third among the Alliance for the Future of Kosovo's candidates as the party's list won thirteen seats. The AAK moved into opposition after the election. Berisha served on the committee for security and defence affairs, and at different times he was a member of the committee for European integration and the investigative committee regarding the privatization process in Kosovo.

Berisha opposed Vjosa Osmani's candidacy for president of Kosovo in 2019 and was quoted as saying, "Our people have respect for women, but if Kosovo is led by Vjosa Osmani, in this situation it would be an adventure for us." The AAK returned to government from June 2020 to March 2021 in a coalition led by Avdullah Hoti of the LDK, and Berisha served as a supporter of the administration for this time.

Berisha was elected to a third term in the 2021 parliamentary election, finishing fourth among the AAK's candidates as the party fell to eight seats. Vetëvendosje (VV) won a significant victory, and the AAK returned to opposition. Berisha was chosen as chair of the security and defence committee and is once again a member of the KIA oversight committee.

Berisha has frequently criticized Kosovo prime minister Albin Kurti for what he describes as Kurti's insufficient commitment to enforcing Kosovo's sovereignty. In December 2022, against the backdrop of the ongoing North Kosovo crisis, he charged that barricades in the predominantly Serb areas could be removed in an hour if the political will existed. In June of the following year, he accused Kurti of losing support for Kosovo in the United States of America and the European Union.

=== Mayoral candidacy (2021) ===
Berisha ran for mayor of Istog in the 2021 Kosovan local elections and was defeated by Ilir Ferati of the Democratic League of Kosovo (LDK) in the second round of voting.

== Electoral record ==
=== Local (Istog) ===
2021 Kosovan local elections: Mayor of Istog
Candidate	Party	First round		Second round	
Candidate	Party	Votes	%	Votes	%
Ilir Ferati	Democratic League of Kosovo	7,974	41.09	9,700	56.16
Bekë Berisha	Alliance for the Future of Kosovo	5,140	26.49	7,573	43.84
Agron Avdijaj	Levizja Vetëvendosje!	4,528	23.34		
Ali Nimanaj	Democratic Party of Kosovo	1,189	6.13		
Idriz Blakaj	Civic Initiative "Together for Istog"	573	2.95		
Total		19,404	100.00	17,273	100.00
