= Aleksandar Arsenijević =

Kosovo Serb politician

- Александар Арсенијевић
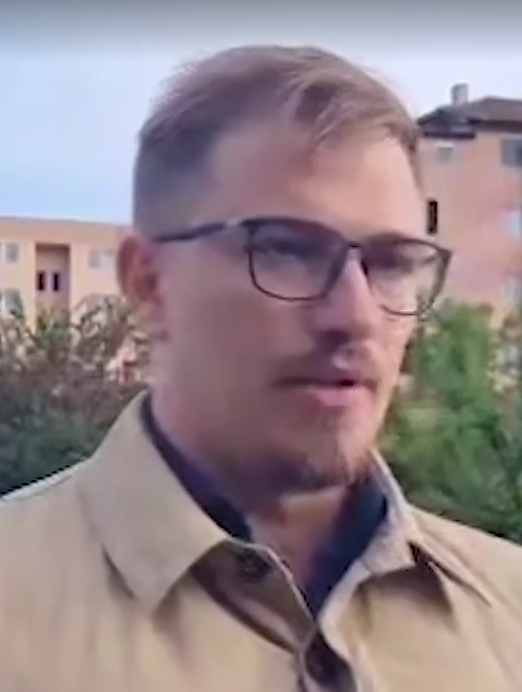
- Arsenijević in 2023

Personal details
- Born: 24 August 1992 (age 34) Pristina, FR Yugoslavia (now Kosovo)
- Citizenship: Serbian; Kosovan
- Party: Serb Democracy
- Education: University of Priština

Aleksandar Arsenijević (Serbian Cyrillic: Александар Арсенијевић; Albanian: Aleksandër Arsenijeviq; born 24 August 1992) is a Kosovo Serb politician, activist and chemistry teacher. A prominent representative of the Serb community in North Kosovo, he is the president of Serb Democracy (SD).

== Biography ==
Arsenijević was born on 24 August 1992 in Pristina. After the Kosovo War and the NATO bombing of Yugoslavia, he was a refugee as a child. He graduated from the Faculty of Science and Mathematics at the University of Pristina, majoring in chemistry. He holds a master's degree in chemistry. He was recognized by the Republic of Serbia as one of the most important students for the survival of the University of Pristina with headquarters in North Mitrovica. He was the president of the Student Parliament of the Faculty of Science and Mathematics for 4 years. He is currently studying at the Faculty of Law at the University of Pristina.

Since 2013, he has been working as a restaurateur, while during 2021 he worked as a chemistry teacher until entering politics when he lost his job.

He entered politics in 2021 when he founded the Civic Initiative "Serbian Survival". He announced his candidacy for mayor of North Kosovska Mitrovica in the 2023 local elections, as the only Serb candidate, but soon withdrew his candidacy due to the Kosovo Serbs boycott.

In December 2023, Serbian Survival was transformed to Serb Democracy and became a political party.

He was arrested several times by the Kosovo Police for his activism against the actions of the Kosovo authorities. According to Arsenijević, even life in a refugee column is better for Serbs than the current situation in Kosovo. Arsenijević believes that Vetëvendosje of Prime Minister Albin Kurti is leading a campaign against him, with the aim of arresting him.

During a joint operation involving the Kosovo Police, KFOR, and EULEX, in the village of Vallaç, Zvečan, a large number of illegal weapons was discovered hidden underground in a horse stable. The arsenal included firearms, hand grenades, rocket launchers, and large quantities of ammunition. According to Kosovo authorities, the facility in which the weapons were found belongs to Arsenijević.
