= Ardian Gjini =

Kosovan politician (born 1970)

Leader of the Alliance for the Future of Kosovo
- Incumbent
- Assumed office 24 May 2026
- Preceded by: Ramush Haradinaj

Mayor of Gjakova
- Incumbent
- Assumed office 1 December 2017
- Preceded by: Mimoza Kusari Lila

Minister of Environment and Spatial Planning
- In office 23 March 2005 – January 2008
- Prime Minister: Bajram Kosumi
- Preceded by: Bajram Kosumi

Member of the Assembly of Kosovo
- In office 13 December 2007 – 7 May 2014

Deputy Mayor of Gjakova
- In office 1999–2000

Personal details
- Born: 18 January 1970 (age 56) Gjakova, SAP Kosovo, SR Serbia, SFR Yugoslavia (now Kosovo)
- Party: Alliance for the Future of Kosovo
- Education: University of Kent
- Occupation: Politician

Military service
- Allegiance: Kosovo Liberation Army
- Battles/wars: Kosovo War

Ardian Gjini (born 18 January 1970) is a politician in Kosovo who has served as president of the Alliance for the Future of Kosovo (AAK) since May 2026. He was a cabinet minister in Kosovo's government from 2005 to 2008, served in the Assembly of Kosovo from 2007 to 2014, and has been the mayor of Gjakova since 2017. Gjini has been a member of the AAK since the party's formation in 2001.

== Early life and private career ==
Gjini was born to a Kosovo Albanian family in Gjakova, in what was then the Socialist Autonomous Province of Kosovo in the Socialist Republic of Serbia, Socialist Federal Republic of Yugoslavia. He fought with the Kosovo Liberation Army (KLA) in the Kosovo War.

Gjini holds a master's degree in international studies and European studies from the University of Kent in Canterbury.

== Politician ==
=== Early years in local government (1997–2002) ===
Gjini was president of the Gjakova branch of the Albanian National Democratic Party from 1997 to 2001. After the end of the Kosovo War in 1999, he became deputy mayor of the city's self-appointed provisional government.

A Christian Science Monitor report from shortly after the war described local authorities in Gjakova as restoring electricity, telephone service, and street lighting to the city, as well as distributing free bread. Gjini was quoted as saying, "After three months of terror, people still feel frustrated and unsafe. [...] Seeing there are phones, streetlights, some local news, bread - they are beginning to feel that they can live here again." Some, including members the United Nations Interim Administration Mission in Kosovo (UNMIK), expressed concerns about the KLA's ongoing influence over the city government.

Gjini was elected to the Gjakova city assembly in the 2000 Kosovan local elections as one of seven delegates from the Alliance for the Future of Kosovo (which, in its initial form, was a literal alliance rather than a united party). The Democratic League of Kosovo (LDK) won a majority victory, and Gjini's term as deputy mayor came to an end. He was not a candidate in the 2002 local elections.

Gjini appeared in the twentieth position on the AAK's list for the 2001 Kosovan parliamentary election, which was held under a system of closed list proportional representation. The list won eight seats, and he was not elected.

=== Party official and assistant to the prime minister (2001–05) ===
Gjini joined the AAK when it became an official party in 2001. In March of that year, he joined party leader Ramush Haradinaj and others on an official delegation to Croatia. After the 2001 Kosovan parliamentary election, he represented the AAK in informal talks with other parties on the formation of a new government.

The AAK participated in Kosovo's coalition government following the 2001 Kosovan parliamentary election, Gjini served as an assistant to Kosovo prime minister Bajram Rexhepi from March 2002 to September 2003. In May 2003, he complained that UNMIK had refused to grant Kosovo's government real competency in matters such as the economy, judiciary, police, legislation, and the budget.

Gjini appeared in the forty-first position on the AAK's electoral list in the 2004 parliamentary election. The party won nine seats, and he was not elected. After the election, the LDK and AAK formed a coalition government. Although the AAK was the junior partner in the coalition, Haradinaj was appointed as prime minister in December 2004, and Gjini was named as his chief political advisor. Shortly after his appointment, he said the government was planning to open information offices for Kosovo in major international capitals.

=== Cabinet minister (2005–08) ===
Ramush Haradinaj was indicated by the International Criminal Tribunal for the former Yugoslavia (ICTY) on war crimes charges in March 2005. He resigned as prime minister and was replaced by Bajram Kosumi, also of the AAK. On 23 March 2005, Gjini was appointed to replace Kosumi as minister of environment and spatial planning. In November of the same year, he was also appointed as the AAK's representative on a team negotiating the status of Kosovo at a series of meetings in Vienna with Serbian delegates.

In July 2006, the Vetëvendosje (VV) movement held protests against the Kosovo government's negotiations with Serbia. Gjini defended the administration's strategy, saying, "If they think we are fooling the people they are fooling themselves. [...] If anyone has a better solution than the negotiations they should tell us."

Gjini also served during this time on a government working group on privatization and the future of the Kosovo Trust Agency. He visited the United States of America in May 2005 as a guest of the Albanian American Civic League to promote the independence of Kosovo. In January 2006, he indicated that the AAK would support Fatmir Sejdiu, the LDK's candidate for president of Kosovo after the death of Ibrahim Rugova.

=== Parliamentarian (2007–14) ===
==== First term (2007–10) ====
Kosovo adopted a system of open list proportional representation prior to the 2007 Kosovan parliamentary election. Gjini was given the tenth position on the party's list, finished seventh amongst its candidates, and was elected when the list won ten seats. The Democratic Party of Kosovo (PDK) and the LDK formed a new coalition government after the election, and the AAK moved into opposition; Gjini's term as a cabinet minister ended in January 2008. He became the leader of the AAK's assembly group and said that his party would support the new government on issues related to the status of Kosovo. The following month, Kosovo's assembly and governing authorities unilaterally declared independence for the territory as the Republic of Kosovo.

Ramush Haradinaj was acquitted of war crimes in April 2008 due to a lack of evidence. Following the verdict, Gjini said, "It was a big mistake to indict him. He is a war hero, not a war criminal, and the greatest living commander in Kosovo. He was also the best prime minister we've seen and made people here believe things could work."

UNMIK called for new talks between Serbia and the Republic of Kosovo in August 2008. Gjini encouraged the Republic of Kosovo government to insist that no changes be made to the Ahtisaari Plan.

Gjini was named as one of four deputy chairpersons of the AAK in December 2008.

==== Second term (2011–14) ====
Gjini finished eighth among the Alliance for the Future of Kosovo's candidates in the 2010 Kosovan parliamentary election and was re-elected when the list won twelve seats. The AAK remained in opposition, and Gjini again served as the party's leader in the assembly. In February 2011, he said that the AAK supported Jakup Krasniqi's bid for re-election as speaker but would not participate in the vote for the new president and cabinet.

In August 2011, Gjini said that the AAK would vote against a motion from the New Kosovo Alliance (AKR) assembly group to introduce religious education to Kosovo's education system. He was quoted as saying, "Let them learn about the religion in the mosques and Orthodox or Catholic churches as much as they want, but religion should not be taught in Kosovo's public schools."

Unlike some other opposition parties in the Republic of Kosovo assembly, the AAK took part in the negotiations that led to the 2013 Brussels Agreement, which normalized some relations between the Serbia and Republic of Kosovo without addressing the status of Kosovo. "We have decided to become a part of this process, so we can give our input to make sure there are no mistakes and that the solution for the [predominantly Serb north of Kosovo] is in Kosovo's favour," Gjini said.

Gjini called for Ibrahim Gashi to stand down as rector of the University of Pristina in February 2014, following revelations of Gashi's academic misconduct.

Gjini finished fourteenth among the AAK's candidates in the 2014 Kosovan parliamentary election and was not re-elected when the list won eleven seats. The election did not produce a clear winner, and Gjini subsequently represented the AAK in an ultimately failed attempt to create a new coalition government with the LDK and the Initiative for Kosovo (NISMA).

=== Mayor of Gjakova (2017–present) ===
Gjini was elected as mayor of Gjakova in the 2017 local elections, defeating incumbent Mimoza Kusari Lila. He was re-elected in the 2021 local elections.

Gjini welcomed Eliot Engel, an American politician known for his support of the Republic of Kosovo, to Gjakova in 2019. During the visit, he introduced a new city street named in Engel's honour.

Gjini continues to serve as a deputy president of the AAK and is a frequent commentator on the Republic of Kosovo's diplomatic activities. In 2018, he described the prospect of a territorial exchange between Serbia and the Republic of Kosovo as "dangerous" and "idiotic." In 2023, he said that his party would support the Ohrid Agreement.

== Electoral record ==
=== Local (Gjakova) ===
2021 Kosovan local elections: Mayor of Gjakova
Candidate	Party	First round		Second round	
Candidate	Party	Votes	%	Votes	%
Ardian Gjini (incumbent)	Alliance for the Future of Kosovo	18,973	45.76	20,796	55.97
Mimoza Kusari Lila	The Alternative (endorsed by Levizja Vetëvendosje!)	15,426	37.20	16,358	44.03
Ferdinand Kolaj	Albanian Christian Democratic Party of Kosovo	2,837	6.84		
Teki Shala	Democratic League of Kosovo	2,330	5.62		
Arbënesha Kuqi	Democratic Party of Kosovo	1,377	3.32		
Fazli Hoxha	Social Democratic Initiative	522	1.26		
Total		41,465	100.00	37,154	100.00

2017 Kosovan local elections: Mayor of Gjakova
Candidate	Party	First round		Second round	
Candidate	Party	Votes	%	Votes	%
Ardian Gjini	Alliance for the Future of Kosovo	17,219	39.88	21,999	53.46
Mimoza Kusari Lila (incumbent)	The Alternative	13,860	32.10	19,152	46.54
Driton Çaushi	Levizja Vetëvendosje!	5,557	12.87		
Ramadan Hoti	Democratic Party of Kosovo	3,506	8.12		
Bekim Ermeni	Democratic League of Kosovo	1,582	3.66		
Fazli Hoxha	Initiative for Kosovo	986	2.28		
Edmond Dushi	New Kosovo Alliance	463	1.07		
Total		43,173	100.00	41,151	100.00
