= Xhafer Tahiri =

Kosovo politician (born 1983)

Xhafer Tahiri (born 15 August 1983) is a politician in Kosovo. He served in the Assembly of the Republic of Kosovo from 2013 to 2014 and was the mayor of Vushtrri from 2017 to 2021. Tahiri is a member of the Democratic League of Kosovo (LDK).

== Early life and career ==
Tahiri was born to an Albanian family in the village of Stanoc in Vushtrri, in what was then the Socialist Autonomous Province of Kosovo in the Socialist Republic of Serbia, Socialist Federal Republic of Yugoslavia. He graduated from the University of Pristina's Faculty of Law in 2004, earned a master's degree the following year from the University of Bologna in Italy, and has worked toward a Ph.D. at the law faculty of the University of Graz in Austria. Tahiri has lectured at Haxhi Zeka University in Peja and at the University of Pristina.

He was director of the legal affairs and international relations department in the office of Kosovo's presidency between 2006 and 2016 and was a member of the supervisory board for Kosovo's Anti-Corruption Agency from 2007 to 2009. After Kosovo's unilateral declaration of independence in 2008, he served on a committee reviewing border demarcation issues between with the Republic of Macedonia (now North Macedonia). He was also a representative of the president's office on the Consultation Council for Minorities.

== Politician ==
Tahiri joined the LDK's youth wing in the early 2000s and was its president from 2009 to 2012. The LDK experienced serious divisions in late 2011, and, as a supporter of former party leader Fatmir Sejdiu, Tahiri briefly saw his standing fall within the party.

=== Parliamentarian ===
Tahiri was given the thirty-fifth position on the LDK's electoral list in the 2010 Kosovan parliamentary election. Parliamentary elections in Kosovo are held under open list proportional representation, and Tahiri finished in thirty-first place among the LDK's candidates. The list won twenty-seven seats, and he was not initially elected; he did, however, receive a mandate on 26 December 2013 as the replacement for another party member. The LDK served in opposition during this time. During his brief term as a legislator, Tahiri was a member of the public finance oversight committee.

Tahiri was again included on the LDK's list in the 2014 parliamentary election, this time in the sixty-seventh position. He finished in fifty-sixth place among the party's candidates; the list won thirty mandates and he was not re-elected.

=== Mayor of Vushtrri ===
Tahiri was elected as mayor of Vushtrri in the 2017 Kosovan local elections, defeating Ferit Idrizi of the rival Democratic Party of Kosovo (PDK) in the second round. He initially governed in a coalition with Vetëvendosje, although the alliance between the parties broke down in early 2021.

In 2020, Tahiri opposed the LDK's decision to remove Vjosa Osmani from the party leadership.

He was defeated by Idrizi in the 2021 local elections in a rematch from four years earlier.

== Electoral record ==
=== Local (Vushtrri) ===
2021 Kosovan local elections: Mayor of Vushtrri
| Candidate | Party | First round | | Second round | |
| Candidate | Party | Votes | % | Votes | % |
|---|---|---|---|---|---|
| Ferit Idrizi | Democratic Party of Kosovo | 10,247 | 34.81 | 13,414 | 53.19 |
| Xhafer Tahiri (incumbent) | Democratic League of Kosovo | 9,956 | 33.82 | 11,806 | 46.81 |
| Arsim Rexhepi | Levizja Vetëvendosje! | 7,667 | 26.04 | | |
| Mensut Ademi | Alliance for the Future of Kosovo | 565 | 1.92 | | |
| Ergin Sunguri | Turkish Democratic Party of Kosovo | 436 | 1.48 | | |
| Albert Maxhuni | Social Democratic Initiative | 322 | 1.09 | | |
| Jeton Salihu | Independent candidate | 245 | 0.83 | | |
| Total | | 29,438 | 100.00 | 25,220 | 100.00 |

2017 Kosovan local elections: Mayor of Vushtrri
| Candidate | Party | First round | | Second round | |
| Candidate | Party | Votes | % | Votes | % |
|---|---|---|---|---|---|
| Xhafer Tahiri | Democratic League of Kosovo | 7,842 | 25.64 | 15,122 | 54.24 |
| Ferit Idrizi | Democratic Party of Kosovo | 10,184 | 33.29 | 12,758 | 45.76 |
| Besim Muzaqi | Levizja Vetëvendosje! | 7,679 | 25.10 | | |
| Nasuf Aliu | New Kosovo Alliance | 2,442 | 7.98 | | |
| Lutfi Bilalli | Alliance for the Future of Kosovo | 1,591 | 5.20 | | |
| Abdullah Vojvoda | Initiative for Kosovo | 852 | 2.79 | | |
| Total | | 30,590 | 100.00 | 27,880 | 100.00 |
