= Central Election Commission (Kosovo) =

Independent body overseeing elections in Kosovo

- Komisioni Qendror i Zgjedhjeve (in Albanian); Централна Изборна Комисија/Centralna Izborna Komisija (in Serbian)
- CEC Logo

Election commission overview
- Formed: 18 April 2000; 26 years ago
- Jurisdiction: Republic of Kosovo
- Status: Independent regulatory agency
- Headquarters: Pristina, Kosovo
- Election commission executives: Commissioner, Kreshnik Radoniqi; Deputy Commissioner, Valmir Elezi
- Website: kqz-ks.org

The Central Election Commission (Albanian: Komisioni Qendror i Zgjedhjeve, Serbian: Централна Изборна Комисија, romanized: Centralna Izborna Komisija), abbreviated in English as CEC, in Albanian as KQZ and in Serbian as ЦИК/CIK, is the permanent, independent, non-partisan election commission responsible for conducting parliamentary, local elections, and referendums in the Republic of Kosovo. It also oversees political parties, government bodies, and the media to ensure electoral laws are upheld.

The commission consists of the Commissioner, the Deputy Commissioner, the Regulatory Commission, and the Commission for Complaints and Sanctions.

== Responsibilities and objectives ==
CEC's main objective is to ensure free, fair, and transparent elections. Responsibilities include:

- Organizing general and local elections, as well as referendums.
- Certifying political parties and candidates for elections.
- Monitoring campaign financing and political party funding.
- Training electoral staff and local commission members.
- Informing the public about electoral processes.

CEC also supervises local election commissions and has authority to enforce the Electoral Code.

== Organization ==
The Central Election Commission was originally established by the amended UNMIK Regulation 2000/21 of 18 April 2000 and was responsible for administering elections in Kosovo. The chairperson was the Deputy Special Representative of the Secretary-General (PSSP) for Institution Building, Head of the OSCE Mission, Ambassador Werner Wnendt. Two of the local commissioners were non-political and represented NGOs focused on human rights and persons with physical and mental disabilities. Commissioners were appointed based on professional qualifications, as the work of the CEC was technical, independent, and neutral. Decisions were taken by consensus, and if consensus was not reached, the chairperson could take the final and binding decision.

After the declaration of Kosovo's independence, the CEC was established in accordance with Article 139 of the Constitution of Kosovo and functions as a permanent and independent body.

=== Composition ===
CEC consists of eleven (11) members: the Commissioner and ten (10) additional members.

- The Commissioner is appointed by the President of Kosovo and is selected among judges of the Supreme Court. The term of the Commissioner is seven (7) years, starting from the official appointment notification.
- The other ten members are appointed based on nominations from the six (6) largest parliamentary groups of the Assembly of Kosovo, and four (4) members represent the minority communities in Kosovo.

=== Councils of the CEC ===
For internal management, CEC has established five (5) permanent councils, each responsible for specific areas and reporting recommendations, reports, and conclusions to the full commission:

- Council for External Relations
- Council for Personnel
- Council for Budget and Finance
- Council for Legal Affairs
- Council for Electoral Operations

=== Secretariat ===
The Secretariat supports CEC in executing its responsibilities, implements commission decisions, prepares reports and recommendations, and provides necessary administrative assistance. It also assists CEC in performing its functions in compliance with electoral regulations.

=== Office for Political Party Registration ===
The Office for Political Party Registration operates as part of the Secretariat and is responsible for the registration and monitoring of political parties.

=== Commissioner ===
The Commissioner directs the civil service of CEC, represents the commission, and monitors all electoral subjects, government bodies, and media organizations.

Responsibilities include:

- Day-to-day administration of the commission
- Supervising electoral procedures
- Appointing and dismissing members of local election commissions
- Organizing and conducting elections
- Monitoring party finances and public institutions during campaigns
- Informing the public
- Administering the CEC budget
- Reporting to the Assembly of Kosovo

=== Deputy Commissioner ===
The Deputy Commissioner assists the Commissioner and oversees specific tasks, including election technology implementation and administrative support.

=== Regulatory Commission ===
Composed of five (5) members appointed by the Assembly of Kosovo, responsible for passing regulations, overseeing election conduct, monitoring media, and enforcing compliance with electoral laws.

=== Commission for Complaints and Sanctions ===
A collegial body of five (5) members, handling complaints against the Commissioner, local commissions, or electoral subjects. It has authority to invalidate election results in specific cases and impose sanctions.
