= Astrit Haraqija =

Kosovan politician (born 1972)

Astrit Haraqija (born 14 June 1972), whose last name is sometimes spelled as Haraqia, is a politician in Kosovo. He was the minister of culture, youth, and sports in the Kosovo government from 2004 to 2008, serving as a member of the Democratic League of Kosovo (LDK).

== Early life and career ==
Haraqija was born in Gjakova, in what was then the Socialist Autonomous Province of Kosovo in the Socialist Republic of Serbia, Socialist Federal Republic of Yugoslavia. He holds a Bachelor of Laws degree. In 1996, he became the leader of the LDK's youth forum in Gjakova.

== Politician ==
=== Early years in local government (2002–04) ===
The LDK won a majority victory in Gjakova in the 2000 Kosovan local elections with twenty-six out of forty-one seats. In March 2002, Haraqija was named as the city's chief executive officer. He appeared in the fourth position on the LDK's electoral list for the city in the 2002 Kosovan local elections; local elections in Kosovo are held under open list proportional representation, and he was presumably elected to the local assembly when the list won a plurality victory with seventeen seats. He ultimately continued to serve as chief executive officer until November 2004.

In September 2004, Haraqija placed signs at Gjakova's entry and exit points declaring the city to be an "autonomous province." This was not a serious declaration of independence but rather a protest against the Kosovo Trust Agency for what he considered to be its slow pace of privatization in the city.

Haraqija was elected as a member of the LDK's presidency in June 2004.

=== Government minister (2004–08) ===
The LDK won the 2004 Kosovan parliamentary election and afterward formed a coalition government with the Alliance for the Future of Kosovo (AAK). Under the terms of the coalition agreement, AAK leader Ramush Haradinaj became prime minister. When the new ministry took office in December 2004, Haraqija became minister of culture, youth, and sports.

Kosovo's governing institutions were at this time overseen by the United Nations Interim Administration Mission in Kosovo (UNMIK). In July 2005, it was reported that UNMIK leader Søren Jessen-Petersen was dissatisfied with Haraqija's performance in office and was seeking his dismissal.

In March 2005, Haraqija signed a memorandum of understanding with Serbian Patriarch Pavle on the reconstruction of Serbian religious sites damaged in the 2004 unrest in Kosovo. In September of the same year, Haraqija travelled to Belgrade for what were described as "very cordial and constructive" talks with Serbian minister of culture Dragan Kojadinović. Their discussions were primarily focused on the reconstruction of Serbian Orthodox churches following the 2004 unrest in Kosovo. Media reports noted that Haraqija was the first government minister in Kosovo to visit Belgrade since the end of the 1998–99 Kosovo War.

Haraqija met with representatives of the American Jewish Committee in July 2006 about the protection of Kosovo's Jewish cultural heritage.

In 2006, the Kosovo government held a public ceremony in Pristina to commemorate the fifth anniversary of the 11 September 2001 attacks in the United States of America. Haraqija described the event as demonstrating the solidarity of Kosovars with the American people; during the ceremony, he described the United States as the "promoter and protector of the world democracy." He added that Kosovo institutions were planning an obelisk to honour of the victims of the 2001 attack.

In May 2007, Haraqija met with Albanian minister of culture Ylli Pango regarding plans to welcome American president George W. Bush to Tirana the following month. Kosovo officials placed high importance on Bush's visit due to ongoing debates around the status of Kosovo.

Kosovo's auditor-general released a report in August 2007, charging Haraqija with abuse of funds in the oversight of his ministry. Haraqija rejected the charge.

During the buildup to Kosovo's unilateral declaration of independence in 2008, various debates took place about the flag of the new entity. Haraqija was the first LDK official to publicly agree with United Nations envoy Martti Ahtisaari that the preferred flag of recently deceased Kosovo president Ibrahim Rugova would not be suitable for this purpose, as it included the Albanian double-headed eagle and hence could not represent all of Kosovo's ethnic communities. Haraqija said that he "[did] not know any greater admirer of President Rugova" than himself but added that the party would need to show flexibility on this point.

The Democratic Party of Kosovo (PDK) defeated the LDK in the 2007 Kosovan parliamentary election, and PDK leader Hashim Thaçi became prime minister in January 2008. Although Thaçi's coalition government included the LDK, Haraqija was not reappointed to cabinet, and his term ended when the new ministry took office. Haraqija was not a candidate in the 2007 parliamentary election; he instead ran for mayor of Gjakova in the concurrent 2007 local elections and was defeated in the second round of voting.

Haraqija had a fraught relationship with Fatmir Sejdiu, Ibrahim Rugova's successor as leader of the LDK. In March 2008, he accused Sejdiu of destroying the LDK and treating the party as his private property.

== Since January 2008 ==
Haraqija has faced several legal challenges since standing down as a government minister.

In April 2008, the International Criminal Tribunal for the former Yugoslavia (ICTY) published a previously sealed indictment against Haraqija and his assistant Bajrush Morina on the charge of intimidating a witness. It was alleged that Haraqija and Morina tried to dissuade the witness in question from testifying against Ramush Haradinaj in the latter's war crimes trial. Haraqija was convicted of the offence on 17 December 2008 and sentenced to five months in prison. On 23 July 2009, the ICTY's Appeals Chamber overturned his conviction.

Haraqija led the LDK's list for the Gjakova municipal assembly in the 2009 Kosovan local elections and was elected when the list won five seats.

In October 2010, Bujar Bukoshi and Ukë Rugova established the Ibrahim Rugova List as a faction within the LDK. Haraqija sided with them, becoming one of the faction's most prominent members. The Rugova List soon began functioning as a distinct party, contesting the 2010 Kosovan parliamentary election on the electoral list of the AAK. The PDK won the 2010 election and afterward formed a new coalition ministry that included the Rugova List. Bukoshi was appointed as one of Kosovo's five deputy prime ministers, and Haraqija was named as a deputy minister of finance.

Both Bukoshi and Haraqija resigned from office amid corruption charges in July 2012. Haraqija was accused of misuse of a public position during his time as minister of culture; the specific charges related to his ministry's decision to provide three hundred thousand Euros for two film projects that were never completed. He was convicted in November 2016 and given a ten-month suspended sentence. Following an appeal, his sentence was increased to one year. A further appeal saw the charges dismissed on technical grounds, when the case was not tried by its legal deadline.

Behgjet Pacolli, who also served as a deputy prime minister after the 2010 election, alleged that Haraqija requested payment of 3.6 million Euros to solve the ownership of Pristina's Grand Hotel during his tenure as a deputy finance minister.

In May 2016, Ukë Rugova, Haraqija, and nineteen others were indicted on charges of organized crime involving trafficking immigrants and the sale of counterfeit visas to Italy. Haraqija presented a different interpretation of these events in a subsequent interview, saying that he began issuing visas for the benefit of specific people, mainly from Gjakova, with the support of Ibrahim Rugova in 1995. He added that most of the people in question later returned to Kosovo. He specifically rejected charges of forgery, saying that the visas had been signed by an ambassador.

The case against Ukë Rugova, Haraqija, and the others accused was initially overseen by the European Union Rule of Law Mission in Kosovo (EULEX). In January 2018, EULEX announced that it was giving up on the case. Analyst Ehat Miftaraj of the Kosovo Law Institute said that EULEX's changing mandate made it impossible for the organization to oversee cases of such complexity; he added that EULEX's inability to deal with the case was one of its greatest failings. The matter was ultimately transferred to the Republic of Kosovo's courts; in November 2023, Ukë Rugova, Haraqija, and the others pleaded not guilty.

Haraqija was a personal friend of Ibrahim Rugova. In a January 2017 interview, he recalled Rugova's dying words of advice to him: "Our greatest luck is that we managed to have the USA as friends. Therefore, even when you will not like any of their decisions, you must respect them. Without America, we wouldn't be anywhere even today."

== Electoral record ==
=== Local (Gjakova) ===
2007 Kosovan local elections: Mayor of Gjakova
Candidate	Party	First round		Second round	
Candidate	Party	Votes	%	Votes	%
Pal Lekaj	Alliance for the Future of Kosovo	12,409	37.98	19,185	56.39
Astrit Haraqija	Democratic League of Kosovo	7,789	23.84	14,836	43.61
Teuta Sahatqija	ORA	3,723	11.39		
Besnik Bardhi	New Kosovo Alliance	3,481	10.65		
Besim Mehmeti	Democratic League of Dardania	2,465	7.54		
Agim Jaka	Democratic Party of Kosovo	1,012	3.10		
Mentor Rruka	Alternative for Gjakova	809	2.48		
Aqif Shehu (incumbent)	Aqif Shehu	571	1.75		
Marjan Oroshi	Democratic Christian Party for Integration	414	1.27		
Total		32,673	100.00	34,021	100.00
