= Fehmi Vula =

Physician and politician in Kosovo

Fehmi Vula (born 29 November 1941) is a medical doctor and politician in Kosovo. His arrest and detention by Serbian authorities in 1998 were reported by international human rights organizations. Vula served in the Assembly of Kosovo from 2004 to 2007 as a member of the Democratic League of Kosovo (LDK).

== Early life and medical career ==
Vula was born to an Albanian family in Gjakova, in what was then the Italian protectorate of Albania. He was raised in Kosovo in the People's Republic of Serbia, People's Federal Republic of Yugoslavia, after World War II. Vula trained as a specialist surgeon and worked in the field for thirty-six years. He was president of the Kosovo Red Cross for a time and was director of the Gjakova general hospital in 1998.

In 2004, he was the leader of one of two Red Cross organizations operating in Kosovo. (A separate organization operated in the Kosovo Serb enclaves of northern Kosovo.)

=== 1998 arrest and detention ===
On 29 May 1998, against the backdrop of the early Kosovo War (1998–99), Serbian state security police ordered Vula to assist them in a search for missing two Serbian police officers. A subsequent report by Physicians for Human Rights stated that the security police believed Vula had sufficient authority to convince others in the Kosovo Albanian community to release the officers and, moreover, that the security police threatened Vula with death if the officers were not found. After three days of an unsuccessful search, the police told Vula he was free to go.

Before Vula could leave the Gjakova police station, however, he was arrested by municipal police officers, who accused him of providing medical assistance to Kosovo Liberation Army (KLA) soldiers behind battlefield lines, purchasing arms for the KLA, and being a KLA organizer. He was held for three days in the Gjakova municipal prison. Physicians for Human Rights later reported that conditions in the jail were unsanitary, and that Vula was forced to stand for three days and given no food other than bread and cheese at his interrogations. He was formally charged with terrorist activities and transferred to Prizren.

At Prizren, Vula told an investigating judge that he had been in a village controlled by the KLA but that there was no fighting at the time, and that he provided medical assistance following a landmine explosion that killed five people and injured five others. According to the police and the judge, the charge against him was at this point changed to failing to report the incident to the police. The judge issued a thirty-day detention order that was later increased to sixty days.

After forty-nine days at Prizren, Vula was transferred to Peja. He was brought before another investigating judge, who ruled that he be kept in detention indefinitely pending further investigation. Six weeks later, he was again transferred to Kosovska Mitrovica. Up to this point, Vula had not been beaten by security forces; he has said, however, that he was beaten severely after arriving in Kosovska Mitrovica and that prisoners at the detention centre were routinely beaten during his three months of incarceration there.

His trial began on 3 November 1998 in Peja and once again involved terrorism charges. The director of the Gjakova hospital (a Serb) and three other civilians testified on his behalf; the court found him guilty, sentenced him to five months in prison, and released him for time served. He returned to work at the Gjakova hospital after his release, though he reported that he was routinely followed by police. He left the area when the NATO bombing of Yugoslavia began and did not return until the conflict was over.

Vula continued to experience threats to his safety after the end of the Kosovo War and the withdrawal of Serbian authorities. In October 2000, the LDK reported that a bomb had been planted in his house but was defused before it could cause any damage.

== Politician ==
=== 1990s ===
In the 1990s, most members of the Kosovo Albanian community boycotted Serbian state institutions and took part in parallel governing structures. Vula was a member of the "parallel" Assembly of Kosovo during this time.

=== 2000s ===
==== Local politics ====
Vula appeared in the seventeenth position on the LDK's electoral list for Gjakova in the 2000 Kosovan local elections. Local elections in Kosovo are held under open list proportional representation; Vula finished second among the LDK's candidates and was elected when the list won a majority victory with twenty-six out of forty-one seats. He was assigned the fourth position on the party's list for Gjakova in the 2002 local elections and was presumably re-elected when the list won seventeen seats.

==== Parliamentarian ====
Vula received the sixteenth position on the LDK's electoral list in the 2004 Kosovan parliamentary election, which was held under closed list proportional representation, and was elected when the list won a plurality victory with forty-seven out of 120 seats. The LDK formed a coalition government with the Alliance for the Future of Kosovo (AAK) after the election, and Vula served as a supporter of the administration. He was a member of the committee for health, labour, and social welfare.

All parliamentary elections in Kosovo since 2007 have taken place under open list proportional representation. Vula appeared in the twenty-sixth position on the LDK's list in the 2007 parliamentary election, finished thirty-first among its candidates, and was not re-elected when the list fell to twenty-five seats. He was not able to enter the assembly in the term that followed as the replacement for another LDK delegate.

==== After 2009 ====
Vula ran as the LDK's candidate for mayor of Gjakova in the 2009 Kosovan local elections and finished third.

== Electoral record ==
=== Local (Gjakova) ===
2009 Kosovan local elections: Mayor of Gjakova
Candidate	Party	Votes	%
Pal Lekaj (incumbent)	Alliance for the Future of Kosovo	21,861	51.92
Mimoza Kusari Lila	New Kosovo Alliance	17,463	41.48
Fehmi Vula	Democratic League of Kosovo	1,937	4.60
Ilir Bytyqi	Democratic Party of Kosovo	787	1.87
Shahin Roka	Social Democratic Party of Kosovo	54	0.13
Total		42,102	100.00
