= Dragiša Krstović =

Kosovo Serb politician

Dragiša Krstović (Serbian Cyrillic: Драгиша Крстовић; born 11 February 1947) is a Kosovo Serb politician. He was a prominent figure in the Kosovo Serb community in the early years of the United Nations Interim Administration Mission in Kosovo (UNMIK) mandate and was at one time the leader of the Serbian "Return" alliance in the Assembly of Kosovo.

== Early life and career ==
Krstović was born in the village of Dren in the municipality of Leposavić, in what was then the People's Republic of Serbia, Federal People's Republic of Yugoslavia. He graduated in law and was a municipal court justice for several years.

== Politician ==
Krstović appeared in the twenty-second position on the Serb community's "Return" coalition in the 2001 Kosovan parliamentary election, which was held via a system of closed list proportional representation under the auspices of UNMIK, and was elected when the list won exactly twenty-two mandates. The assembly was dominated by parties from the province's majority Albanian community. Relations between the Albanian and Serb communities were generally poor in the aftermath of the Kosovo War (1998–99), and the Serb bloc often boycotted assembly proceedings to protest the status of their community, the inability of Serb refugees to return to their homes, and the marginalization of Serb assembly members.

=== Leader of the "Return" coalition ===
In December 2002, Krstović was chosen as the leader of the Return parliamentary group, replacing Rada Trajković. Shortly after his appointment, he endorsed Nebojša Čović's call for a new Dayton conference on the status of Kosovo. Krstović was quoted as saying, "The Albanians have a firm position on independence for Kosmet [Kosovo and Metohija] and the Serbs maintain that the province should remain a part of Serbia and Yugoslavia. Other variants also exist and I believe that it is possible to reach a solution that will satisfy both sides." He welcomed subsequent diplomatic talks in Vienna, although he criticized the absence of Kosovo Serb representatives from the province's delegation.

Krstović was often critical of Michael Steiner, who led UNMIK from 2002 to 2003. In March 2003, he and other Serb leaders expressed dissatisfaction with the UN body's track record in providing security and freedom of movement for the Serb community. The following month, he warned that Steiner's decision to transfer various responsibilities from UNMIK to the province's interim institutions was premature and could lead to regional destabilization. He welcomed Steiner's departure in June 2003, saying that the outgoing UNMIK leader had not "done a thing for the return of the non-Albanian population."

In December 2003, Krstović led a walkout of Serb delegates after the Kosovo assembly approved a declaration against recognizing the upcoming Serbian parliamentary election on the territory of Kosovo. (UNMIK later rejected the assembly's resolution and confirmed that Kosovo residents would be allowed to participate in the Serbian vote).

Krstović made efforts to stop the 2004 unrest in Kosovo, the worst outbreak of inter-communal violence in the province after the Kosovo War. During the peak of the violence, he told a reporter, "I made appeals to the Serbs to refrain from escalating clashes because the shedding of blood is in nobody's interests." He later agreed to meet with Kosovo prime minister Bajram Rexhepi to discuss solutions for ending the violence.

Krstović reached an agreement with Rexhepi and Kosovo president Ibrahim Rugova in July 2004 to request that UNMIK create a new ministry to deal with the return of displaced persons to Kosovo. Media reports described this as a rare moment of co-operation between the Albanian and Serb communities.

Krstović was the chair of the committee on communities and a member of the judicial affairs committee during his first assembly term.

=== Second term in the Kosovo assembly ===
Despite calls for a boycott in some circles, Krstović and other leaders of the Kosovo Serb community chose to participate in the 2004 Kosovan parliamentary election on the Serbian List for Kosovo and Metohija (not to be confused with the later Serb List). The turnout in the Serb community was low, with only around fifteen hundred out of two hundred thousand eligible voters casting a ballot. Because ten seats in the assembly are automatically reserved for Serb delegates, the Serbian List won eight mandates; Krstović, who held the fifth position on the Serbian list, was accordingly re-elected. He considered not taking his seat due to ongoing calls for a boycott, but he ultimately had his mandate verified on 3 December. Krstović later blamed the boycott for worsening political conditions in the province, saying that Serb voters could have improved their standing by electing at least thirty deputies through a strong turnout. He did not continue as leader of the Serb bloc in the new assembly; this role was taken by Oliver Ivanović.

During his second term in the assembly, Krstović was a member of the committee on justice, legislation, and the constitutional framework.

Krstović was a member of Serbia's Democratic Party (DS) for most of his time as an elected official. He was dismissed as the party's municipal leader in Leposavić in 2005 and became an independent.

== Since 2007 ==
Krstović was not a candidate in the 2007 Kosovan parliamentary election, which was again largely boycotted by the Serb community.

He sought election as mayor of Leposavić in the 2013 local elections as a candidate of the Independent Liberal Party and finished in third place. He also appeared on the party's electoral list in the concurrent municipal assembly election, which was held under open list proportional representation. He finished in fourth place among the party's candidates and, as the list won only two mandates, was not elected.

== Electoral record ==
=== Local (Leposavić) ===
2013 Kosovan local elections: Mayor of Leposavić
Candidate	Party	Votes	%
Dragan Jablanović	Civic Initiative "Srpska"	2,225	51.48
Blagoje Nedeljković	Democratic Initiative	940	21.75
Dragiša Krstović	Independent Liberal Party	538	12.45
Radomir Veličković	Civic Initiative "SDP - Oliver Ivanović"	244	5.65
Nenad Radosavljević	People's Justice	209	4.84
Slađan Kostić	Civic Initiative "Together"	166	3.84
Total		4,322	100.00
