= Ibrahim Selmanaj =

Kosovan politician

Ibrahim Selmanaj (born 7 October 1968), whose last name is sometimes spelled Selmonaj, is a politician and former Kosovo Liberation Army (KLA) officer in Kosovo. He has been a member of the Assembly of the Republic of Kosovo, the mayor of Deçan, and a minister in government of Kosovo. Selmanaj is a member of the Alliance for the Future of Kosovo (AAK).

== Early life and career ==
Selmanaj completed high school in Deçan and continued his studies at the "Bajram Curri" school in Gjakova. For several years prior to the Kosovo War (1998–99), he taught at an elementary school in the village of Rastavicë in Deçan.

== Kosovo War ==
During the Kosovo War, Selmanaj was the Kosovo Liberation Army's deputy commander for morale in the Dukagjin region.

== Politician ==
=== Early years in local politics (1999–2005) ===
Forces of the Kosovo Liberation Army entered Deçan in June 1999, at the conclusion of the Kosovo War. According to an article in the Wall Street Journal Europe, Selmanaj replaced his military fatigues with a white shirt and double-breasted suit a few minutes after the army's arrival and took power as mayor of the community, under the KLA's auspices. The town had experienced serious infrastructural damage at the end of war; according to the WSJE article, Salmanaj began the process of restoring power and water to the town within twenty-four hours, as KLA forces collected flour to restart the town bakery. In the same period, he said that local forces would start their own war crimes investigations, with trials to start once judges and jurors could be appointed.

The United Nations Interim Administration Mission in Kosovo (UNMIK) appointed Helinä Kokkarinen as municipal administrator of Deçan later in 1999. Online sources do not indicate if Selmanaj also continued to exercise local authority after this time.

Selmanaj appeared in the lead position on the Alliance for the Future of Kosovo's electoral list in Deçan for the 2000 Kosovan local elections and received the most votes of the party's candidates. The AAK won ten seats, finishing second against the Democratic League of Kosovo (LDK), and he served in opposition for the next term.

He again led the AAK's list for Deçan in the 2002 local elections. Both the LDK and the AKK won fifteen seats on this occasion, with a third party holding the balance of power. Selmanaj was ultimately chosen as mayor of the assembly. He was credited with personally intervening to prevent a mob from destroying the historic Visoki Dečani monastery during the 2004 unrest in Kosovo.

Salmanaj appeared in the twenty-third position on the AAK's list for the 2004 Kosovan parliamentary election, which was held under closed list proportional representation. The list won nine seats, and he was not elected.

=== Government minister (2005–2008) ===
The LDK won the 2004 parliamentary election and afterward formed a coalition government with the AAK. As part of the coalition agreement, AAK leader Ramush Haradinaj was initially chosen as prime minister. He resigned in March 2005, after being indicted for war crimes by the International Criminal Tribunal for the former Yugoslavia (ICTY). Haradinaj's resignation prompted a minor cabinet shuffle, and on 22 March 2005 Selmanaj was appointed as Kosovo's minister for labour and social affairs.

In July 2005, Selmanaj requested that the government allocate twenty-five thousand Euros for KLA veterans. The government chose to double the amount, providing fifty thousand Euros. Later in the year, he met with Macedonian labour and social affairs minister Stevčo Jakimovski to discuss the return of refugees living in their respective jurisdictions.

Selmanaj met with Turkish labour and social security minister Murat Başesgioğlu in June 2006, while both men were attending a conference of the International Labour Organization (ILO) in Geneva. During the meeting, he highlighted the fact that Kosovo had an unemployment rate of 42.5% and called for information and expert staff to be exchanged between Kosovo and Turkey.

In December 2006, Selmanaj's political adviser Naim Bazaj was arrested on serious charges of arms trafficking. This became a source of controversy for Selmanaj; prime minister Agim Çeku ordered him to investigate his department and admonished his ministry generally to be vigilant about choosing their co-workers. Selmanaj, for his part, immediately dismissed Bazaj from the ministry and expressed surprise at his activities.

=== Parliamentarian (2007–11) ===
Kosovo switched to a system of open list proportional representation prior to the 2007 parliamentary election. Selmanaj appeared in the ninth position on the AAK's list, finished fifth among its candidates, and was elected when the list won ten seats. The Democratic Party of Kosovo (PDK) won the election and afterward formed a new government with the LDK, while the AAK served in opposition. Selmanaj's ministerial term ended when the new government took office in early 2008. He was a member of parliament in February 2008, when the Republic of Kosovo unilaterally declared independence from Serbia.

During his parliamentary term, Selmanaj served on the committee for the supervision of the Kosovo Intelligence Agency and the committee for human rights, gender equality, missing persons, and petitions.

He was given the thirty-seven position on the AAK's list in the 2010 parliamentary election, finished fifty-sixth among its candidates, and was not re-elected when the list won twelve seats.

=== Since 2011 ===
After taking some time away from political life, Selmanaj served as director of health and social welfare in Deçan. In February 2020, he was appointed as a member of Kosovo's Central Election Commission.
