= Pal Lekaj =

Kosovan politician

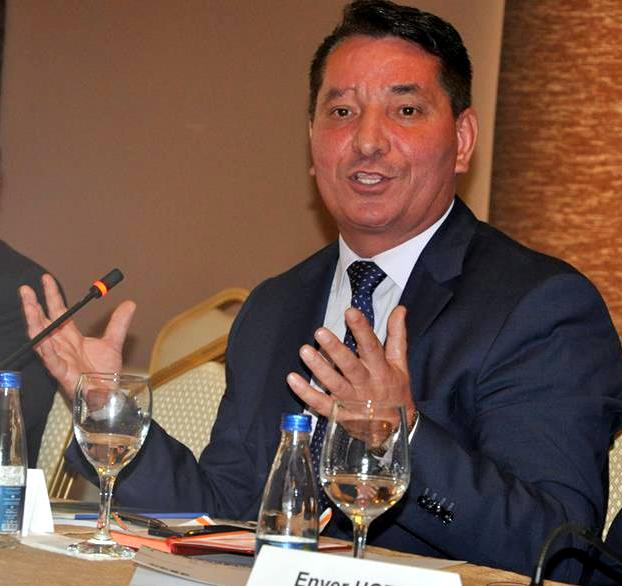
Pal Lekaj

Pal Lekaj (born 29 June 1962) is a politician and medical doctor in Kosovo. He was the mayor of Gjakova from 2007 to 2013 and a cabinet minister in the Republic of Kosovo government from 2017 to 2020. Lekaj is a member of the Alliance for the Future of Kosovo (AAK).

== Early life and career ==
Lekaj was born to an Albanian family in Gjakova, in what was then the Autonomous Region of Kosovo and Metohija in the People's Republic of Serbia, Federal People's Republic of Yugoslavia. He graduated from the University of Pristina's Faculty of Medicine in 1993 as a Doctor of General Medicine. During the Kosovo War (1998–99), Lekaj provided medical assistance to injured members of the Kosovo Liberation Army (KLA). He received a master of medical management from the Netherlands School of Public Health in 2000.

== Politician ==
=== Early years in local government (2000–07) ===
Lekaj was director of health and social welfare in Gjakova's provisional government from 1999 to 2000. He was appointed as director of the city's public hospital in 2000.

He was elected to the Gjakova city assembly in the 2000 Kosovan local elections as a candidate of the Alliance for the Future of Kosovo, which was at that time a literal alliance rather than a united party. Local elections in Kosovo are held under open list proportional representation; Lekaj appeared in the twelfth position on the AAK's electoral list, finished second among the alliance's candidates, and was elected when the list won seven seats. The Democratic League of Kosovo (LDK) won a majority government in the city, and the AAK served in opposition. It became a registered political party in 2001.

Lekaj was promoted to the second position on the AAK's list in the 2002 local elections and was re-elected when the list won ten seats. The LDK once again won the election.

Lekaj became chief executive officer of Gjakova in 2007. He took part in a delegation to Montenegro in May of that year, during which he called for the return of persons displaced from the city in the 1998–99 conflict. "The doors remain open for all of those that were not involved in crimes towards the population during the war," he said.

=== Mayor of Gjakova (2007–13) ===
Kosovo introduced the direct election of mayors in the 2007 Kosovan local elections. Lekaj ran as the AAK's candidate in Gjakova and was elected in the second round of voting. During the buildup to Kosovo's unilateral declaration of independence in February 2008, he led a delegation of leading city representatives to Albania and met with prime minister Sali Berisha. During the meeting, Berisha pledged his support for Kosovo as an independent state. Later in the year, Lekaj supported the United Nations Interim Administration Mission in Kosovo (UNMIK)'s decision to prevent Gjakova's Serb community from creating a parallel municipal assembly after the controversial 2008 Serbian local elections in Kosovo.

In late 2008, the leader of Kosovo Force (KFOR)'s Multinational Task Force West met with Lekaj and described the security situation in Gjakova as the safest in the area for which he was responsible.

Lekaj was re-elected in the first round of voting the 2009 local election. In the 2013 local election, he was defeated by Mimoza Kusari Lila of the New Kosovo Alliance (AKR).

=== Parliamentarian (2014–17) ===
Lekaj was assigned the fourteenth position on the AAK's electoral list in the 2014 Kosovan parliamentary election. He finished in third place among the party's candidates and was elected when the list won eleven seats. After protracted negotiations, the Democratic Party of Kosovo (PDK) and LDK formed a coalition government, and the AAK served in opposition. In his first term, Lekaj was a member of the committee on foreign affairs; the stabilization and association committee; and the committee on legislation, mandates, immunities, rules of the assembly, and supervision of the Anti-Corruption Agency.

The PDK-LDK government introduced two extremely controversial pieces of legislation in the 2014–17 term, respectively concerning a border demarcation with Montenegro and the creation of an Association of Serb Municipalities. The opposition AAK and Vetëvendosje parties strongly opposed these initiatives and frequently disrupted the assembly's proceedings to prevent their passage. In October 2015, Lekaj was part of an AAK delegation that met with Republic of Kosovo president Atifete Jahjaga in a bid to overcome the political impasse. Prior to the meeting, Lekaj said, "We will go to meet the president but we will not retreat an inch from our request - withdrawal from agreements and then dialogue."

Several AAK and Vetëvendosje politicians disrupted assembly meetings in this period by opening tear gas canisters. Lekaj was at one time quoted as saying the opposition had an "endless supply of tear gas." He was himself detained on suspicion of opening a canister in December 2015, although it does not appear that he was arrested. The AAK ended its support for the tear gas protests in early 2016, and Lekaj became the leader of the party's parliamentary group at around the same time.

Lekaj was chosen as a substitute member of the Assembly of Kosovo's delegation to the Parliamentary Assembly of the Council of Europe (PACE) in January 2017. He served until January 2018 and was not a member of any political alliance within the body.

The PDK and AAK formed an electoral alliance for the 2017 parliamentary election. Lekaj received the sixteenth position on their combined list, finished twenty-seventh, and was re-elected when the list won a plurality victory with thirty-nine seats.

=== Cabinet minister (2017–20) ===
The PDK and AAK continued their alliance after the 2017 election and became the dominant parties in a new coalition government. AAK leader Ramush Haradinaj became prime minister, and Lekaj was appointed as minister of infrastructure.

In March 2018, Lekaj criticized the rates on Albania's first toll road as being too high. (Many Kosovars regularly cross the Albanian border to use the road in question.) Later in the same year, he announced a delay on a planned highway from Pristina to the border with the Republic of Macedonia (now North Macedonia), accusing the previous administration of not paying the building consortium.

Construction work began near the Visoki Dečani monastery in May 2018, leading to complaints from the Serbian Orthodox Church that a road was being constructed in the monastery's protective zone. Lekaj responded that the work was taking place outside the zone and was quoted as saying, "I would like to use this opportunity and inform everyone [...] that we are dealing with a completely normal matter and it should not be translated as something against the communities or to cause unnecessary noise."

Lekaj and Jassim Saif Al Sulaiti signed an air transport agreement between the Republic of Kosovo and Qatar in July 2018, allowing Qatar's national airline to expand its operations worldwide.

In December 2018, the Serb List threatened to bring down the Republic of Kosovo's government following the expulsion of Marko Đurić, the director of Serbia's Office for Kosovo and Metohija. Lekaj described this as an "empty threat" and was quoted as saying, "the Serb List should realize once and for all that they are citizens of Kosovo, an independent and sovereign state."

Hardinaj's administration fell in mid-2019, and the PDK and AAK did not maintain their alliance into the 2019 parliamentary election. Lekaj was given the seventh position on the AAK's list, finished fourth, and was elected to a third term when the list won thirteen seats. Vetëvendosje won the election and formed a new administration with the LDK; Lekaj continued to serve as a cabinet minister in a caretaker government until the new administration took office in February 2020.

At the end of his ministerial term, Lekaj signed new rail and motorway agreements between Serbia and the Republic of Kosovo. These were not supported by the incoming Vetëvendosje-led administration.

=== Return to parliament (2019–present) ===
The Vëtevendosje–LDK administration lost a confidence vote less than two months after its formation and formally resigned in June 2020. The LDK formed a new administration with the AAK, and Lekaj served in the assembly as a government supporter. The LDK–AAK government, in turn, fell from power in December 2020.

Lekaj again received the seventh position on the AAK's list in the 2021 Kosovan parliamentary election, finished sixth, and was elected to a fourth term when the AAK won eight seats. Vetëvendosje won a landslide victory, and the AAK returned to opposition. Lekaj is now a member of the committee on budget, labour, and transfer, and the committee on economy, industry, entrepreneurship, and trade.

== Legal issues ==
After the end of his second mayoral term, Lekaj was charged with abuse of office for personal benefit. The charges were dropped in May 2017.

In April 2018, he was charged with abuse of office and embezzlement pertaining to his time as mayor. When the charges were filed, he said, "All I can say for now is that in no case did I do something, which was not in accordance with the law." He was acquitted in January 2022.

In January 2024, Lekaj was convicted along with three aides and sentenced to three years and eight months' imprisonment and a 3.5 year ban on holding public office on charges of abuse of power in an overspending case involving the construction of the Arben Xhaferi highway in 2017 when he was infrastructure minister.

== Electoral record ==
=== Local (Gjakova) ===
2013 Kosovan local elections: Mayor of Gjakova
Candidate	Party	First round		Second round	
Candidate	Party	Votes	%	Votes	%
Mimoza Kusari Lila	New Kosovo Alliance	20,160	43.95	25,183	52.38
Pal Lekaj (incumbent)	Alliance for the Future of Kosovo–Democratic League of Dardania (Affiliation: Alliance for the Future of Kosovo)	16,376	35.70	22,890	47.62
Hajdar Beqa	Democratic Party of Kosovo	5,574	12.15		
Luan Gola	Democratic League of Kosovo	2,926	6.38		
Arberije Nagavci	Levizja Vetëvendosje!	830	1.81		
Total		45,866	100.00	48,073	100.00

2009 Kosovan local elections: Mayor of Gjakova
Candidate	Party	Votes	%
Pal Lekaj (incumbent)	Alliance for the Future of Kosovo	21,861	51.92
Mimoza Kusari Lila	New Kosovo Alliance	17,463	41.48
Fehmi Vula	Democratic League of Kosovo	1,937	4.60
Ilir Bytyqi	Democratic Party of Kosovo	787	1.87
Shahin Roka	Social Democratic Party of Kosovo	54	0.13
Total		42,102	100.00

2007 Kosovan local elections: Mayor of Gjakova
Candidate	Party	First round		Second round	
Candidate	Party	Votes	%	Votes	%
Pal Lekaj	Alliance for the Future of Kosovo	12,409	37.98	19,185	56.39
Astrit Haraqija	Democratic League of Kosovo	7,789	23.84	14,836	43.61
Teuta Sahatqija	ORA	3,723	11.39		
Besnik Bardhi	New Kosovo Alliance	3,481	10.65		
Besim Mehmeti	Democratic League of Dardania	2,465	7.54		
Agim Jaka	Democratic Party of Kosovo	1,012	3.10		
Mentor Rruka	Alternative for Gjakova	809	2.48		
Aqif Shehu (incumbent)	Aqif Shehu	571	1.75		
Marjan Oroshi	Democratic Christian Party for Integration	414	1.27		
Total		32,673	100.00	34,021	100.00
