= Nenad Radosavljević =

Kosovo Serb politician, administrator and media owner

Nenad Radosavljević (Serbian Cyrillic: Ненад Радосављевић; born 31 March 1961) is a Kosovo Serb politician, administrator, and media owner. He was a prominent figure in the Kosovo Serb community in the early years of the United Nations Interim Administration Mission in Kosovo (UNMIK) mandate.

== Early life and career ==
Before entering political life, Radosavljević was director of the ironworks factory at Lešak in Leposavić and director general of the tools factory in Zvečan.

== Politician and administrator ==
=== SNV leader, mayor, and parliamentarian (1999–2002) ===
Radosavljević led the Leposavić branch of the Serbian National Council (SNV) after the end of the Kosovo War (1998–99). He owned a radio station in northern Kosovo during this time, was active with the New Democracy (ND) party, and was a prominent local opponent of Slobodan Milošević's government.

Relations between Kosovo's majority Albanian and minority Serb communities were generally poor in the aftermath of the Kosovo War. The Organization for Security and Co-operation in Europe (OSCE) organized a census for Kosovo in 2000, which was largely boycotted by the Serb community, as a prelude to local elections later in the same year. Unlike some community leaders, Radosavljević was open to the prospect of co-operation with OSCE and Serb participation in the vote. His position met with strong opposition, with some arguing that any poll would be premature before the security situation improved and Serb refugees could return to province. On one occasion, a registration drive in Leposavić that had been approved by Radosavljević was shut down by community militants from Kosovska Mitrovica. One news report indicates that Radosavljević was forced to stand down as municipal SNV leader because of his position on the matter, though this is contradicted by another report indicating that he continued serving until 2001.

Radosavljević attended talks in Washington, D.C., in July 2000 as a representative of the SNV. The talks did not deal with the status of Kosovo but rather with ending the ongoing violence between the Serb and Albanian communities and creating the conditions for democratic institutions in the area.

New Democracy participated in the 2000 Yugoslavian general election as part of the Democratic Opposition of Serbia (DOS), and Radosavljević campaigned with DOS presidential candidate Vojislav Koštunica in Leposavić. Koštunica defeated Slobodan Milošević in the election, a watershed moment in the political life of Yugoslavia and Serbia.

The Serb community generally boycotted the 2000 local elections in Kosovo, and the results in Leposavić were not validated. A new municipal assembly was later appointed under the auspices of UNMIK, and the assembly selected Radosavljević as mayor. He stood down later in 2001.

Radosavljević appeared in the fifth position on the list of the Serbian "Return" coalition in the 2001 Kosovan parliamentary election, which was held via closed list proportional representation under the auspices of UNMIK, and was elected when the list won twenty-two seats. After the election, he complained that Serb politicians were largely being ignored in the assembly, against the backdrop of ongoing conflicts among the province's Albanian parties.

=== UNMIK representative (2002–05) ===
In May 2002, Radosavljević was appointed as a senior advisor to UNMIK leader Michael Steiner at the nomination of the "Return" coalition. He held responsibility for returns (i.e., of displaced persons) and communities. In this capacity, he encouraged Serbs to participate in the 2002 Kosovan local elections. After the poor performance of the "Return" group in these elections, Radosavljević remarked that the coalition was approaching its logical end.

He opposed an assembly boycott by Serb MPs in 2002, saying, "It is not courageous if Serb deputies leave the Kosovo parliament and run away from it. The courageous thing to do is to fight regardless of the difficult position in which Return Coalition deputies have been working since the very beginning." He added that Serb MPs had done creditable work in fighting to ensure freedom of movement, safety, and the return of Serb property throughout the province.

In the aftermath of the March 2004 unrest in Kosovo, Radosavljević said that attempts to reconstruct Serb homes in Svinjare were being hindered by extremist elements in the Albanian community, who were dismantling newly restored homes on an almost nightly basis. He refused to sign a declaration for a Kosovo ministry on the rights of communities, human rights, and return issues in this period, arguing that the ministry would simply give the province's Albanian leadership increased rights without increased responsibility. He described the ministry's eventual creation as "an attempt by UNMIK to avoid the responsibility for not working and having bad results."

In October 2004, Radosavljević expressed concern that Serbs in Kosovo were being offered large sums of money to sell their homes in order to reduce the community's numbers in the province.

He resigned from his UNMIK position on 26 January 2005, saying, "there is neither ethical nor political reason for me to create an illusion of well-being in the post of a high advisor, and to, without a possibility to prevent it, watch the further cleansing of my people instead of their return."

=== From 2005 to 2022 ===
The Serbian government established a Council for Kosovo-Metohija in February 2005, and Radosavljević was appointed as one of its members. Two months later, he was one of six SNV delegates who participated in a meeting with Serbian prime minister Vojislav Koštunica.

New Democracy was renamed as the Liberals of Serbia (LS) in 2003. The party contested the 2007 Serbian parliamentary election on the electoral list of the Serbian Renewal Movement (SPO). Radosavljević was included on the list, which did not cross the electoral threshold to win assembly representation.

In October 2007, Radosavljević walked out of a round-table discussion on the status of Kosovo organized by the American-based Project on Ethnic Relations, on the grounds that the views of Serb participants were being ignored.

The Liberals of Serbia initially planned to participate in the 2007 Kosovan parliamentary election but ultimately chose not to do so. Radosavljević explained that the party's change in strategy was due to the Serbian government's call for a boycott, saying, "a clash of interests between the state and Serbs in the region would undoubtedly be detrimental to the Kosovo people. Without state support, without stronger Serbian institutions in the province, it is unlikely the Serbs could have survived." He later argued that the boycott was a mistake; had the Serbs voted, he said, "they would have had their legitimate representatives and there would be no problem as to who is or is not legitimate."

Radosavljević ran for mayor of Leposavić in the 2013 local elections as the candidate of his own "People's Justice" movement and finished in fifth place. "People's Justice" won a seat on the municipal assembly, which automatically went to Radosavljević as the list's leader. In September 2014, he said that he and three other elected delegates had never received invitations to the assembly, which he contended was therefore improperly constituted. He ran for mayor again in the 2017 local elections and finished a distant third; on this occasion, his list did not win any assembly mandates.

Radosavljević is now the owner of TV Mir in Leposavić. He is a vocal opponent of Serbian president Aleksandar Vučić, whom he has described as operating a dictatorial regime. In 2021, he rejected the suggestion that health and education services in northern Kosovo's Serb communities could be integrated into the Republic of Kosovo's system. "Health and education must remain an integral part of the Serbian system even now," he said.

=== North Kosovo crisis (2022–present) ===
Radosavljević has been extremely critical of Serbia's political leadership in the ongoing North Kosovo crisis. In December 2022, he charged that barricades had been erected in northern Kosovo to protect the interests of the Serb List political party rather than the local population.

In April 2023, he said that a pending mayoral election in Leposavić would lack legitimacy due to a Serb boycott and that any local administration resulting from the election would be unsustainable. The vote took place on 23 April, and Lulzim Hetemi of the Vetëvendosje (VV) party was elected mayor against the backdrop of a very low turnout.

In July 2023, Radosavljević accepted an appointment from Leposavić's municipal government to lead the directorate of sports, youth, and culture. He said that he had not personally interacted with Hetemi and that he accepted the position in order to provide stability and normalization.

== Electoral record ==
=== Local (Leposavić) ===
2017 Kosovan local elections: Mayor of Leposavić
Candidate	Party	Votes	%
Zoran Todić	Serb List	5,105	63.20
Dragan Jablanović (incumbent)	Party of Kosovo Serbs	2,807	34.75
Nenad Radosavljević	Civic Initiative "People's Justice"	166	2.05
Total		8,078	100.00

2013 Kosovan local elections: Mayor of Leposavić
Candidate	Party	Votes	%
Dragan Jablanović	Civic Initiative "Srpska"	2,225	51.48
Blagoje Nedeljković	Democratic Initiative	940	21.75
Dragiša Krstović	Independent Liberal Party	538	12.45
Radomir Veličković	Civic Initiative "SDP - Oliver Ivanović"	244	5.65
Nenad Radosavljević	People's Justice	209	4.84
Slađan Kostić	Civic Initiative "Together"	166	3.84
Total		4,322	100.00
