= Husnija Bešković =

Bosniak politician

Husnija Bešković (born 3 December 1953) is a Bosniak politician in Kosovo. He was a member of the Assembly of Kosovo in the 2004–07 term and has served as a deputy minister in the government of the Republic of Kosovo.

== Early life and career ==
Bešković was born in Plav, in what was then the People's Republic of Montenegro in the Federal People's Republic of Yugoslavia. He later moved to nearby Peć (Albanian: Peja) in Kosovo. He attended commercial high school and worked in business before entering political life.

== Politician ==
=== Party of Democratic Action ===
Bešković appeared in the lead position on the Party of Democratic Action (SDA)'s electoral list for Peć in the 2000 Kosovan local elections and was elected when the list won a single seat.

=== Bosniak Democratic Initiative of Kosovo ===
Bešković left the SDA in 2002. For that year's local election in Peć, he led a citizen's initiative called the Bosniak Democratic Initiative of Kosovo – Husnija Bešković (BDIKHB). He was again elected when the list won a single seat.

In April 2004, Bešković registered the citizen's initiative as the Bosniac Party of Kosovo. Two months later, he brought the party into the newly formed Vakat Coalition of Bosniak parties in the province.

=== Vakat Coalition ===
Bešković appeared in the fourth position on the Vakat Coalition's list in the 2004 Kosovan parliamentary election, which was held under closed list proportional representation. He missed direct election when the list won three seats but received a mandate in either December 2004 or early 2005 as a replacement for Sadik Idrizi, who had been appointed to cabinet. Bešković served on the assembly's security committee and the committee on judicial affairs, legislative and constitutional framework, gender equality, petitions, and public requests.

He opposed Kosovo's drive for independence in 2007 and instead supported a framework of autonomy for the province within Serbia.

Prior to the 2007 Kosovan parliamentary election, Kosovo switched to a system of open list proportional representation. Bešković was again given the fourth position on the Vakat Coalition's list, finished fifth among its candidates, and was not re-elected when the list again won three seats.

For the 2010 parliamentary election, Bešković appeared in the seventh position on Vakat's list and finished in sixteenth place among its candidates. The list fell to two seats and he was again not elected. Vakat took part in Kosovo's coalition government after the election, and Bešković served as a deputy minister for communities and returns from 2011 to 2014.

By 2014, Bešković was the leader of the local New Bosniak Party (NBS) in Peć, which operated within the Vakat Coalition. He signed a coalition agreement with the Democratic League of Kosovo (LDK) to participate in Peć's municipal government following the 2013 local elections. He was later given the fourth position on Vakat's list in the 2014 Kosovan parliamentary election, finished tenth among its candidates, and was not elected to the assembly when the list won two seats.

=== New Democratic Party ===
Bešković later left the Vakat Coalition and joined the New Democratic Party (NDS). He appeared on the party's lists in the 2017 and 2019 parliamentary elections and did not come close to winning election on either occasion.
