= Riza Lluka =

Kosovan politician

Riza Lluka (1943–25 November 2014) was a politician in Kosovo. He served in Kosovo's provincial assembly during the 1980s, was a member of the parallel Kosovo Albanian assembly in the 1990s, and was a municipal politician in Peja in the 2000s. He is best known for protesting the Serbian government's reduction of Kosovo's autonomy in 1989.

== Early life and career ==
Lluka was born during World War II to a Kosovo Albanian family in Peja. After the war, he was raised in the Autonomous Region of Kosovo and Metohija in the People's Republic of Serbia, Federal People's Republic of Yugoslavia. His family was active in business. He was a construction engineer in private life.

In the 1990s, Lluka worked with Anton Çetta on the blood reconciliation project among members of the Albanian diaspora community in the United States of America.

== Politician ==
=== Provincial assembly ===
Kosovo was upgraded to provincial status in 1968 as the Socialist Autonomous Province of Kosovo. Lluka served in the provincial assembly from 1982 to 1990 and chaired the council for urbanism and municipal work in Kosovo's chamber of united labour.

On 23 March 1989, the Kosovo assembly voted on changes to the 1974 constitution to significantly reduce the province's autonomy within Serbia. This was part of Slobodan Milošević's drive to centralize political authority in Serbia and consolidate his own power base. Prior to the vote, several "guests" entered the assembly to intimidate the delegates and manipulate the outcome. Lluka objected to the presence of the "guests" and demanded that they be removed. His efforts were not entirely successful, and he was ultimately one of only a small number of delegates to vote against the changes. A photograph of Lluka raising his fingers in the debate was published in the international media and became an iconic protest image for Kosovo Albanians seeking autonomy (and ultimately independence) from Serbia.

=== Parallel assembly ===
The provincial assembly was shut down in July 1990, and several Albanian delegates met in its courtyard to declare a parallel government. In the decade that followed, most Kosovo Albanians boycotted Serbian political institutions and operated within their own structures. Several sources indicate that Lluka served in the 1992–98 parallel assembly as a member of Parliamentary Party of Kosovo (PPK).

=== Post-war activities ===
Serbia lost effective control over most of Kosovo following the 1998–99 Kosovo War, and the United Nations Interim Administration Mission in Kosovo (UNMIK) assumed power in the province on a transitional basis. In 2000, the Parliamentary Party of Kosovo became part of the Alliance for the Future of Kosovo (AAK), which, in its first incarnation, was a literal alliance rather than a united party. Lluka appeared in the twenty-third position on the AAK's electoral list for Peja in the 2000 Kosovan local elections. Local elections in Kosovo are held under open list proportional representation; the AAK list won eight seats in the city, and he was not elected.

Lluka does not seem to have joined the AAK when it became a united party in 2001. He sought election to the Peja assembly as an independent candidate in the 2002 local elections and was elected. He later ran as an independent candidate in the 2004 Kosovan parliamentary election but did not receive enough votes for a mandate.

He subsequently joined the AAK and appeared in the fourth position on its list for Peja in the 2007 local elections. He finished in fifth place among the party's candidates and was re-elected when the list won a plurality victory with ten out of forty-one seats. He was again given the fourth position on the AAK's list in the 2009 local elections but on this occasion finished twentieth and lost his seat, even as the party increased its total to thirteen mandates. He did not return to political life after this time.

== After 2009 ==
Lluka was director of RTV Dukagjini in his last years. He died on 25 November 2014 after a short illness.
