= Ramadan Gashi =

Kosovan politician

Ramadan Gashi (born 15 April 1958) is a politician in Kosovo. He was the mayor of Skenderaj from 2001 to 2007 and a member of the Assembly of Kosovo from 2008 to 2011. During his time as an elected official, Gashi was a member of the Democratic Party of Kosovo (PDK).

He is not to be confused with a Kosovan diplomat of the same name.

== Early life and career ==
Gashi was born to an Albanian family in the village of Kryshec in Skenderaj, in what was then the Autonomous Region of Kosovo and Metohija in the People's Republic of Serbia, Federal People's Republic of Yugoslavia. He studied at the University of Pristina Faculty of Law and holds a master's degree in law. Prior to the 1998–99 Kosovo War, he was involved in civic organizations such as the Council for the Protection of Human Rights and Freedoms in Skenderaj.

== Politician ==
=== Mayor of Skenderaj (2001–2007) ===
After the end of the Kosovo War, Gashi became a leading figure in the Democratic Party of Kosovo (PDK) in Skenderaj. The party held overwhelming dominance over the Drenica region (which includes Skenderaj) in this period, and local officials from the rival Democratic League of Kosovo (LDK) complained that its members were often threatened with violence. Gashi dismissed the charge as "lies and propaganda," saying, "We don't need to threaten any other parties."

The PDK won a landslide victory in Skenderaj in the 2000 Kosovan local elections, taking twenty-seven of thirty-one seats. Gashi led the PDK's electoral list and was afterward chosen as mayor. In July 2002, he was elected as a member of the PDK's steering council.

He appeared in the ninetieth position on the PDK's list for the 2001 Kosovan parliamentary election, which was held under closed list proportional representation. The list won twenty-six seats, and he was not elected.

Gashi led the PDK to another overwhelming victory in Skenderaj in the 2002 local elections and continued in office as mayor. He did not seek re-election at the local level in 2007.

=== Parliamentarian (2008–11) ===
Kosovo adopted a system of open list proportional representation prior to the 2007 parliamentary election. Gashi was given the forty-first position on the PDK's list and finished thirty-third among its candidates. The list won thirty-seven seats. He was not immediately elected to a requirement for one-third female representation; he was, however, ranked second to enter the assembly as a replacement member. The PDK formed a coalition government after the election, and some of its parliamentarians soon resigned to take ministerial positions. As such, Gashi was able to enter the assembly on the week of its convocation in January 2008. The following month, the Republic of Kosovo unilaterally declared independence from Serbia. Gashi served on the assembly committee on legislation and the judiciary and was a member of other ad hoc committees, including one dealing with laws arising from the Ahtisaari Plan.

He was given the fifty-second position on the PDK's list in the 2010 assembly election, placed fifty-ninth, and was not re-elected when the list won thirty-four seats. The PDK won the election and remained in government.

=== Since 2011 ===
In May 2012, Gashi was appointed as a deputy justice minister in the Republic of Kosovo government. He was removed from office a month later, when the newspaper Koha Ditore reported that there was an indictment against him for abuse of office pertaining to his time as mayor of Skenderaj. He has not returned to active political life since this time.

Gashi has worked as executive director of the Republic of Kosovo's Free Legal Aid Agency. He supported Skenderaj mayor Bekim Jashari's unsuccessful bid for re-election in the 2021 Kosovan local elections.
