= Teuta Sahatqija =

Kosovo politician

Teuta Sahatçija (born 15 April 1962) is a politician and diplomat in Kosovo. She has served three terms in the Assembly of Kosovo, initially with the Reformist Party ORA, which she led from 2008 to 2010, and later with the Democratic League of Kosovo (LDK). She was Consul General for the Republic of Kosovo in New York City from 2016 to 2020.

== Early life and career ==
Sahatqija was born to a Kosovo Albanian family from Gjakovë, in what was then the Autonomous Region of Kosovo in the People's Republic of Serbia, Federal People's Republic of Yugoslavia. She graduated from the University of Pristina in 1985 as an electronics engineer. Sahatqija worked at the Printeus computer centre in Prizren from 1985 to 1987 and was head of the Ereniku centre in Gjakova from 1987 to 1999. She worked in information technology with the Organization for Security and Co-operation in Europe (OSCE) and the United Nations Interim Administration Mission in Kosovo (UNMIK) in 1998–99 and oversaw her own business in the same field from 1999 to 2004.

== Politician ==
=== Reformist Party ORA ===
Sahatqija appeared in the sixth position on the Reformist Party ORA's electoral list in the 2004 Kosovan parliamentary election, which was held under closed list proportional representation. She was elected when the list won seven seats. The LDK won the election and afterward formed a coalition government with the Alliance for the Future of Kosovo (AAK); ORA served in opposition, and Sahatqija led its parliamentary group. She was a member of the committee for trade and industry and the committee for international co-operation and Euro-Atlantic integration.

In November 2007, Sahatqija took part in a two-day summit in Vienna convened by Austrian foreign affairs minister Ursula Plassnik that included representatives of Kosovo's Serb and Albanian communities. Sahatqija and Vesna Jovanović, a parliamentarian from the Serbian List for Kosovo and Metohija, both spoke of the difficulties in achieving meaningful dialogue between their communities. With reference to an impending Serb boycott of Pristina's electoral institutions due to Kosovo's drive for independence, Sahatqija was quoted as saying, "Reconciliation needs both sides. If one hand hangs in the air, it won't work."

Kosovo adopted a system of open list proportional representation prior to the 2007 parliamentary election. Sahatqija appeared in the third position on ORA's list and received the second highest vote total of any party candidate. The list did not cross the electoral threshold for parliamentary representation, and she did not serve in the parliament that followed. She also ran for mayor of Gjakova in the concurrent 2007 local elections and finished third.

ORA founder Veton Surroi resigned as party leader after the 2007 election, and plans to recruit Agim Çeku as his replacement ultimately failed. Sahatqija was chosen as the party's leader without opposition in March 2008, following an endorsement from Surroi. She was a frequent critic of the Republic of Kosovo's government, led by the Democratic Party of Kosovo (PDK), over the next two years.

ORA fared poorly in the 2009 local elections and voted to merge into the Democratic League of Kosovo in February 2010. Sahatqija was quoted as saying, "Just as, twenty years ago, it was a force that rallied people to create an independent Kosova, the LDK is now showing readiness to transform into a force that will strive for state building and a European Kosova."

=== Democratic League of Kosovo ===
Sahatqija became a vice-president of the LDK in 2010. She was an assistant to Republic of Kosovo president Fatmir Sejdiu in the same year.

She appeared in the sixth position on the LDK's list in the 2010 Kosovan parliamentary election, finished in twenty-second place, and was elected when the list won twenty-seven mandates. The PDK won the election, and the LDK served afterward in opposition. Sahatqija was vice-president of the committee for economic development, infrastructure, trade, and industry, and chaired the cross-party women's parliamentary caucus.

Following the release of a 2011 Council of Europe report documenting allegations of human organ trafficking in Kosovo, Sahatqija said, "I am for a thorough investigation of the allegations and for the culprits to be locked up, so that no blot gets stuck to Kosovo."

Sahatqija was again given the sixth position on the LDK's list in the 2014 parliamentary election and finished thirty-fifth among the list's candidates. The LDK won thirty seats; Sahatqija was re-elected due to a requirement for one-third female representation. The overall election results were inconclusive, and the PDK ultimately formed a coalition government with the LDK. Sahatqija served as a government supporter and was chair of the committee on European integration. In early 2016, she said that the European Union Rule of Law Mission in Kosovo (EULEX) was not serving a useful purpose and that the European Union should instead help to strengthen Kosovo's judicial institutions.

Although the LDK is generally considered to be a right-of-centre party, Sahatqija represented a progressive tendency within its parliamentary group.

Sahatqija resigned from parliament in June 2016 on being appointed as Kosovo's Consul General in New York City. She served in this role for four years and signed agreements on the recognition of Kosovo with Bangladesh, Malawi, and Barbados. During Avdullah Hoti's ministry in 2020–21, she was Kosovo's deputy minister of foreign affairs.

In 2021, two unofficial diplomatic documents were circulated that did not rule out the partition of Kosovo in a final settlement agreement with Serbia. Sahatqija was quoted as saying the documents "must be strongly opposed because they endanger the country's constitutional order. Returning to the situation before the declaration of independence must be opposed."

== Electoral record ==
=== Local (Gjakova) ===
2007 Kosovan local elections: Mayor of Gjakova
Candidate	Party	First round		Second round	
Candidate	Party	Votes	%	Votes	%
Pal Lekaj	Alliance for the Future of Kosovo	12,409	37.98	19,185	56.39
Astrit Haraqija	Democratic League of Kosovo	7,789	23.84	14,836	43.61
Teuta Sahatqija	ORA	3,723	11.39		
Besnik Bardhi	New Kosovo Alliance	3,481	10.65		
Besim Mehmeti	Democratic League of Dardania	2,465	7.54		
Agim Jaka	Democratic Party of Kosovo	1,012	3.10		
Mentor Rruka	Alternative for Gjakova	809	2.48		
Aqif Shehu (incumbent)	Aqif Shehu	571	1.75		
Marjan Oroshi	Democratic Christian Party for Integration	414	1.27		
Total		32,673	100.00	34,021	100.00
