= Ramë Manaj =

Kosovar politician

Ramë Manaj (born 24 July 1954) is a former politician in Kosovo. He was the mayor of Klina from 2001 to 2006 and was one of two deputy prime ministers of the Republic of Kosovo between 2008 and 2010. He was a member of the Democratic League of Kosovo (LDK) during his time in public life and was the party's secretary-general from 2006 to 2010.

== Early life and career ==
Manaj was born to a Kosovo Albanian family in the village of Gllarevë in Klina, in what was then the Autonomous Region of Kosovo and Metohija in the People's Republic of Serbia, Federal People's Republic of Yugoslavia. He was raised in the community, attended secondary school in nearby Peja, and earned a Bachelor of Laws degree from the University of Pristina.

He wrote for the Rilindja daily newspaper from 1977 to 1979 and worked for Bauxite Mining in the municipality for ten years. He was dismissed in 1990, against the backdrop of growing tensions between the Serb and Albanian communities in Kosovo.

== Politician ==
Manaj joined the Democratic League of Kosovo in 1990 and led one of its sub-branches in Klina for the next five years. In 1995, he became a member of the party's Klina presidency.

Serbia lost effective control over most of Kosovo, including the Klina municipality, following the 1998–99 Kosovo War.

=== Mayor of Klina (2001–06) ===
Manaj was given the seventh position on the LDK's electoral list for Klina in the 2000 Kosovan local elections. He finished ninth among the party's candidates and was elected when the list won a majority victory with seventeen out of thirty-one seats. Ismet Rraci was chosen as the municipality's mayor after the election. He was assassinated by unknown parties on 23 April 2001, and Manaj was chosen as his replacement.

Manaj said in March 2002 that he would not discuss the return of Serb refugees to Klina until, in his phrasing, Serbs cooperated in the identification of war criminals and gave up their dream of colonizing the territory.

The LDK won another victory in Klina in the 2002 local elections. Manaj (who, somewhat unusually, appeared in the fifth rather than the lead position on the party's list) was confirmed afterward for another term as mayor. In June 2004, he became a member of the LDK's presidency.

Notwithstanding his comments three years earlier, Manaj said in 2005 that conditions for the return of Serb refugees to Klina were improving and that dialogue had started between the local Serb and Albanian populations. Søren Jessen-Petersen, special representative of the United Nations Interim Administration Mission in Kosovo (UNMIK), praised Manaj later in the year for implementing Standards on return.

=== Political advisor and party official (2006–07) ===
Kosovo president and LDK leader Fatmir Sejdiu appointed Manaj as his political advisor in February 2006. One month later, Kolë Berisha was elected as speaker of the Assembly of Kosovo, and Manaj was reassigned as his advisor.

Manaj was also chosen as secretary-general of the LDK in December 2006. The following year, he was named as a party representative on Kosovo's constitutional commission and served on a working group on state symbols.

Some sources have indicated that Manaj oversaw an intelligence service operated by the LDK.

After the United Nations Security Council rejected a resolution on the status of Kosovo in July 2007, Manaj said that the only path forward was for Kosovo "to be recognized unilaterally" by various states, led by the United States of America. He rejected the suggestion of a confederation with Serbia, describing the idea as "deranged."

=== Parliamentarian (2007–08) ===
Manaj appeared in the thirteenth position on the LDK's electoral list for the 2007 Kosovan parliamentary election, which was the first to be held under open list proportional representation. He finished in sixteenth place among the party's candidates and was elected when the list won twenty-five seats. The rival Democratic Party of Kosovo (PDK) defeated the LDK in the overall vote but fell well short of a majority, and Manaj subsequently represented the LDK in difficult talks for a new coalition government.

=== Cabinet minister (2008–10) ===
The PDK and LDK formed a new government on 9 January 2008. PDK leader Hashim Thaçi became prime minister, and Manaj was appointed as one of two deputy prime ministers. By virtue of holding a cabinet position, he was required to resign from the assembly.

In January 2008, Manaj dismissed an offer by the Parliamentary Assembly of the Council of Europe (PACE) for further talks on the status of Kosovo. He was quoted as saying, "All the reasons for continuing talks [...] have been exhausted. Even if these negotiations had continued for years, they would have again ended up being unsuccessful, because Serbia lacks the readiness to recognize the state of Kosova [the Albanian-language name for Kosovo]. It only wishes to prolong the Kosova status process as much as it can." Shortly before Kosovo's declaration of independence, he said, "most [Kosovo Serbs] will continue to stay in Kosovo and will contribute in its overall development. Those who are influenced by Belgrade politics might behave irrationally, but we believe that with time irrationality will disappear and Serbs in general will accept the new reality." The Republic of Kosovo unilaterally declared independence from Serbia on 17 February 2008.

Manaj condemned the Serbian government's decision to hold its own local elections in Kosovo later in 2008. Concerning future negotiations with Serbia, he said, "There could be talks on technical issues, which are in the interest of our citizens, but there could be no talks on status and related issues. This is clear, definite, and final."

While serving as deputy prime minister, Manaj signed an agreement with Estonia on the recognition of the Republic of Kosovo. In September 2008, he became one of the first five people to receive a Republic of Kosovo diplomatic passport. He later criticized a decision by the European Union Rule of Law Mission in Kosovo (EULEX) to sign an agreement with Serbia's ministry of internal affairs, saying that no agreement would be permissible without the Republic of Kosovo's consent.

Manaj welcomed the nomination of Joseph Biden as the Democratic Party's vice-presidential nominee for the 2008 United States presidential election, given Biden's record of support for the Republic of Kosovo, although he added, "Strong bonds of cooperation between the United States and Kosova have already been established, and regardless of who wins the elections we do not expect changes in the US policy towards Kosova."

The LDK experienced significant divisions after party founder Ibrahim Rugova's death in 2006 and remained divided during the 2008–10 ministry. Manaj was considered a prominent supporter of party leader Fatmir Sejdiu. In July 2009, Manaj rejected a suggestion that the Democratic League of Dardania (LDD) could merge into the LDK.

The LDK withdrew from the Republic of Kosovo's government in October 2010. All ministers from the party tendered their resignations; Manaj was the only one to meet with Hashim Thaçi in person to explain his decision. The following month, Isa Mustafa succeeded Sejdiu as LDK leader. Manaj was re-elected to the party presidency, although he stood down as general secretary at this time.

Manaj appeared in the fourteenth position on the LDK's electoral list in the 2010 Kosovan parliamentary election, fell to forty-fifth place in the vote totals, and was not elected when the list won twenty-seven seats.

== Since 2010 ==
Manaj has largely withdrawn from public life since 2010. He serves as president of the State Agency of Kosovo Archives. In 2020, he led a government commission for missing persons.
