= Lajçi =

Lajçi is a surname. Notable people with the surname include:

- Ali Lajçi (1955–2024), politician in Kosovo
- Besnik Lajçi (1971–1999), Albanian and Kosovo Liberation Army fighter
- Çun Lajçi (born 1946), Albanian actor, musician, author, and drama teacher
