= Bangladesh–Kosovo relations =

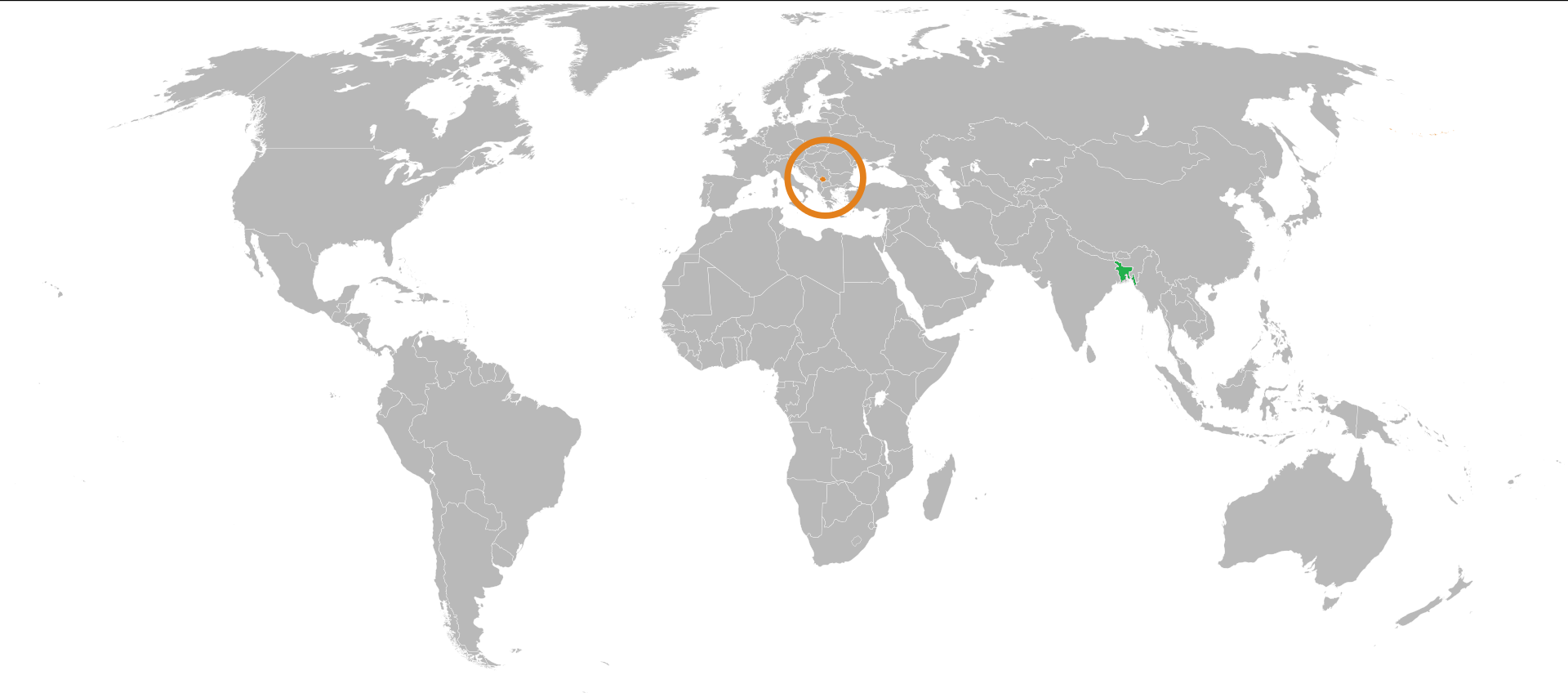

- Bangladesh: Kosovo

Diplomatic mission
- none: Embassy of Kosovo, Dhaka

Envoy
- none: Ambassador Lulzim Pllana

Bangladesh–Kosovo relations are foreign relations between Bangladesh and Kosovo. Bangladesh recognised the Republic of Kosovo as an independent state on 27 February 2017. A year later on the same date, Kosovan consul in New York Teuta Sahatqija and Bangladesh's Permanent Representative to the United Nations Masud Bin Momen signed a treaty to officially establish diplomatic relations.

== Bangladesh's reaction to the 2008 Kosovo declaration of independence ==
On 29 June 2008, Bangladeshi Chief Advisor, Fakhruddin Ahmed, during a meeting with the US Ambassador to Bangladesh, James F. Moriarty, affirmed that "Bangladesh will recognize the new European country". The Chief Advisor also assured the US ambassador that "Bangladesh is committed to lobbing [sic] Asian Muslim countries to recognize Kosovo. Bangladesh will actively contribute to the development of Kosovo". Following a meeting on 17 December 2008 between Bangladeshi Foreign Adviser Iftekhar Ahmed Chowdhury and Moriarty, the media were told that the question of Kosovo recognition was under "active consideration of the [Bangladeshi] government." In a press briefing on 22 August 2009, Bangladesh's Foreign Secretary Mohamed Mijarul Quayes said "At this moment, we don't feel the necessity to recognise Kosovo". He said his government would consider "many factors" before making its decision. "If we recognise Kosovo, we are certainly taking one side. But if we don't, we are not taking anyone's side," he said. In a meeting with Moriarty on 15 November 2009, Quayes said that an independent decision would be made on Bangladesh's recognition of Kosovo, keeping the country's national interests in consideration. It was reported that Bangladesh had not yet recognised Kosovo because it was focusing on strengthening ties with Moscow – Russia had formally requested Bangladesh not to recognise [Kosovo]. On 13 May 2010, the Foreign Minister of Bangladesh, Dipu Moni, said that her country will come to a decision regarding the recognition of Kosovo's independence after the International Court reaches a conclusion about the matter. Following a September 2010 meeting with the Prime Minister of Bangladesh, Albanian Prime Minister Sali Berisha said that Bangladesh had promised to decide positively regarding recognition of Kosovo.
After giving a speech at Ankara University in April 2012, Bangladeshi Prime Minister Sheikh Hasina responded to a question about recognising Kosovo by stating "We have already discussed the matter and are observing the situation in Kosovo. You may soon hear the good news".
In December 2013, the Special Representative of Bangladesh to the Organisation of Islamic Cooperation stated that recognition of Kosovo would be seriously considered.

== Recognition ==
The Government of the People's Republic of Bangladesh recognised the Republic of Kosovo as Independent state on 27 February 2017. Bangladeshi Prime minister Sheikh Hasina send the verbal note to Kosovan Prime minister Isa Mustafa.

== Bilateral relations ==
Bangladesh and Kosovo share a friendly relationship. In 2018, they signed a visa waver deal for their officers.

== See also ==
- Foreign relations of Bangladesh
- Foreign relations of Kosovo
- Bangladesh–Serbia relations
