= Illyrian tombs in Boka-Përçeva =

Archaeological site in Kosovo

Illyrian tombs in Boka-Përçeva (Klina)
- Tumat Ilire në lokalitetin Boka në Përçevë (Albanian)
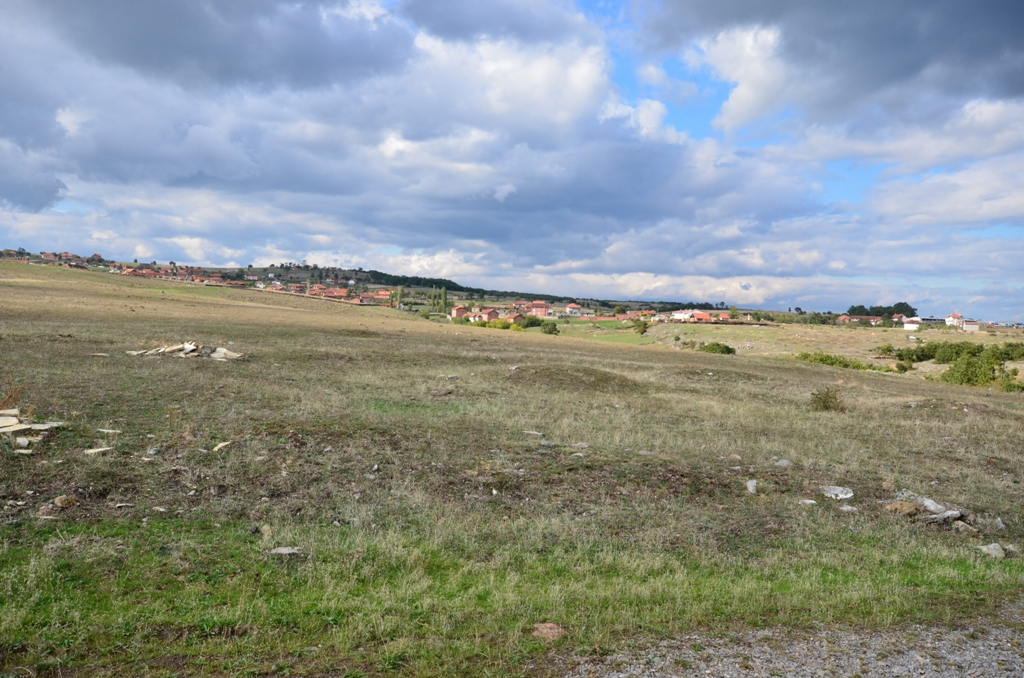
- Location: Përçeva, Klina, Kosovo

History
- Built: Prehistory

The Illyrian tombs in Boka-Përçeva constitute a cultural heritage monument in Përçeva, Klina, Kosovo.

The necropolis and tumuli are located only a few kilometers from the village of Gllarevë. Dating to the Late Bronze Age and the Early Iron Age, the complex includes nineteen tumuli, of which seven were excavated in the 1970s. Exploration of the site unearthed high-quality weapons, ornaments, and ceramic vessels for their time, evidence of active settlement by Illyrians in what would later be the Kingdom of Dardania.

== Gallery ==
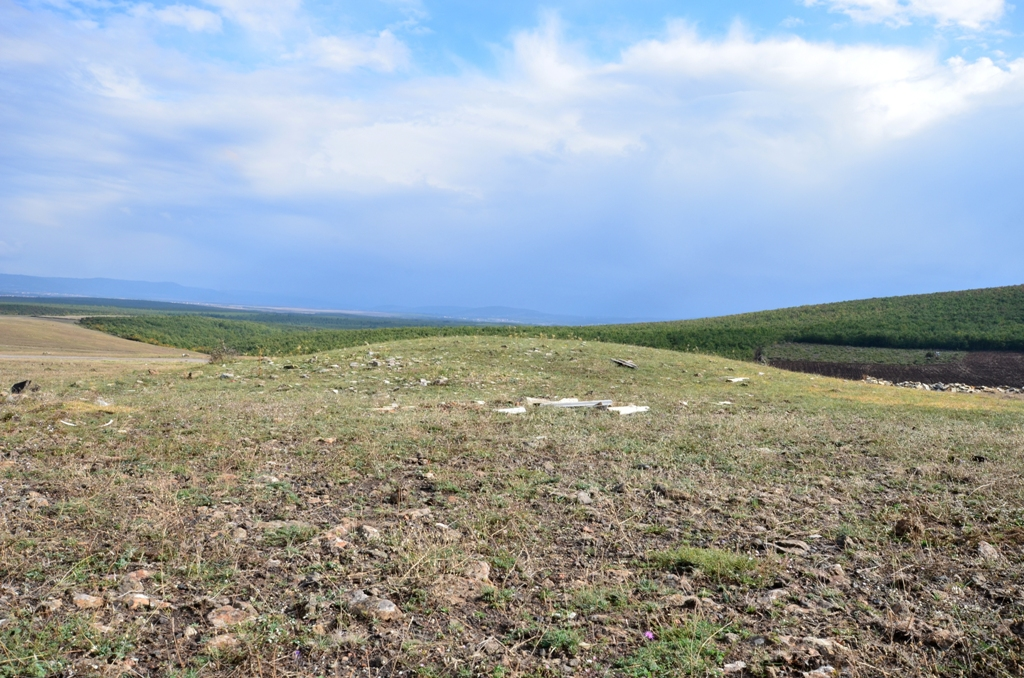

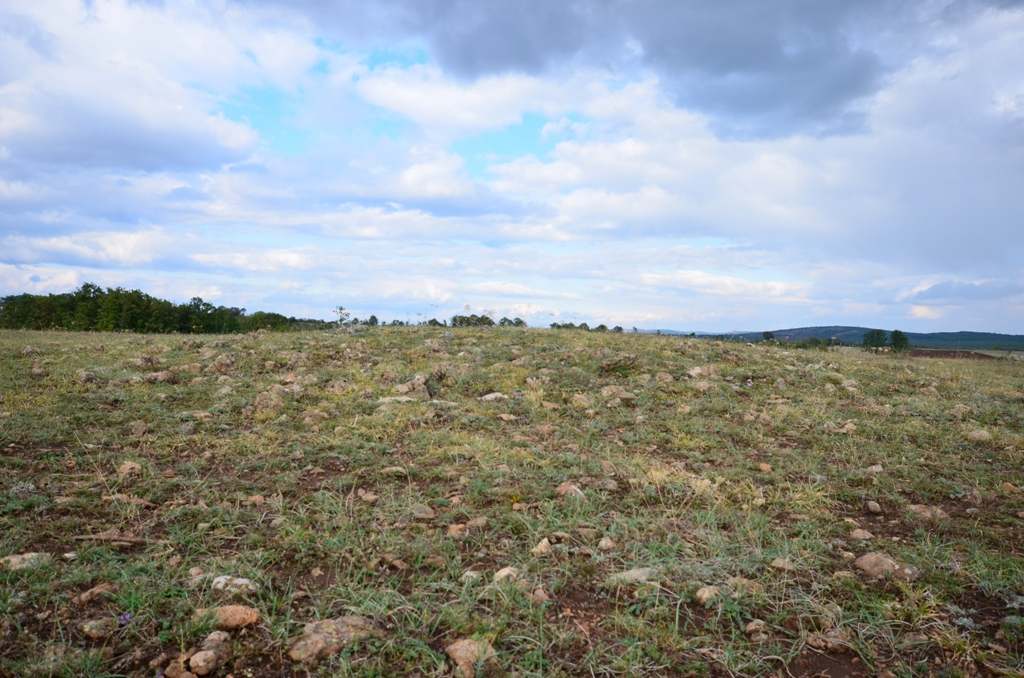

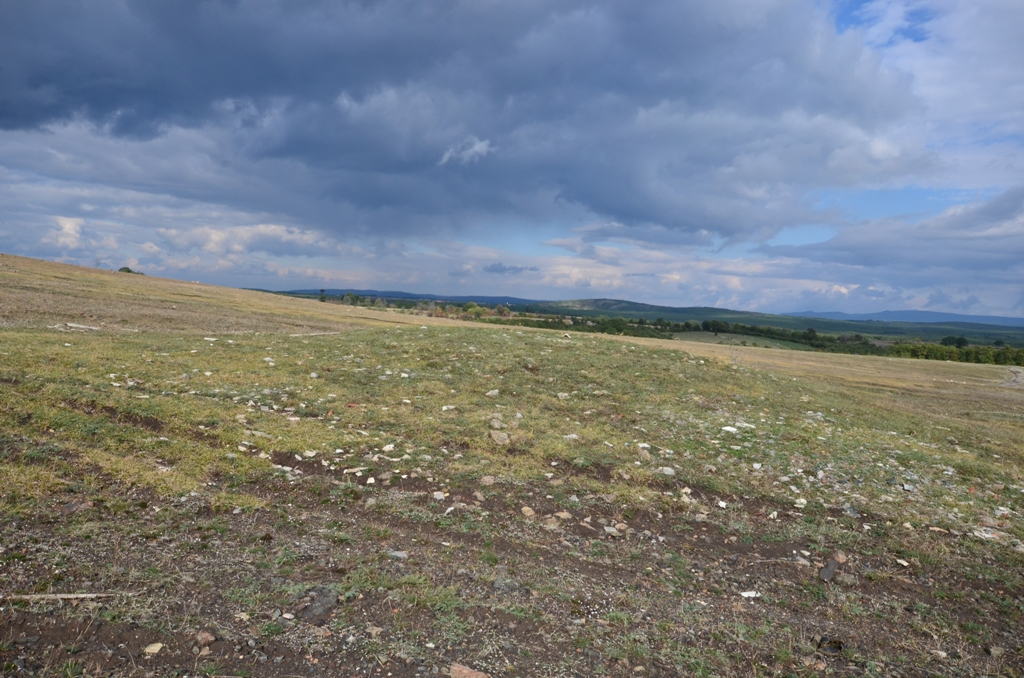

== See also ==
- Archaeology of Kosovo
- Kingdom of Dardania
