= Aqif Shehu =

Kosovo Albanian politician and footballer

Mayor of Gjakova
- In office 2001–2007

Personal details
- Born: Gjakova, FPR Yugoslavia (modern Kosovo)
Association football career
Senior career*
Years	Team	Apps	(Gls)
1975–1979	Liria	117	(4)
1979–1980	Trepça	1	(0)
1980–1985	Vëllaznimi	116	(4)
- * Club domestic league appearances and goals

Aqif Shehu is a former politician in Kosovo and former footballer. He was a member of the parallel Republic of Kosova assembly in the 1990s and served as mayor of Gjakova from 2001 to 2007. For most of his time as an elected official, Shehu was a member of Democratic League of Kosovo (LDK).

== Political career ==
=== 1990s parallel assembly ===
During the 1990s, most members of Kosovo's Albanian community boycotted Serbian state institutions and operated through parallel government structures. Shehu was elected to the parallel Albanian assembly in the 1992 general election as one of the representatives from Gjakova. During this period, the LDK was the dominant party within Kosovo's Albanian community.

=== Mayor of Gjakova (2001–07) ===
Serbia lost effective control of most of Kosovo after the 1998–99 Kosovo War, and the Organization for Security and Co-operation in Europe (OSCE) and United Nations Interim Administration Mission in Kosovo (UNMIK) organized new local elections for the province in late 2000. Shehu appeared in the lead position on the LDK's electoral list in Gjakova and was elected when the list won a majority victory with twenty-six out of forty-one seats. The elections were marked by violence; a Gjakova rally by LDK leader Ibrahim Rugova was interrupted by gunshots and electrical sabotage, and Shehu reported that grenades were thrown at the homes of some LDK members. After the election, Shehu was chosen as mayor.

In November 2001, he signed an agreement making Gjakova a sister city of Jamestown, New York.

Shehu appeared in the fourteenth position on the LDK's list in the 2001 Kosovan parliamentary election, which was held under closed list proportional representation, and was elected when the list won a plurality victory with forty-seven seats. He appears to have declined his mandate to continue serving as mayor.

He again led the LDK's list for Gjakova in the 2002 local elections and was elected when the list won a plurality victory with seventeen seats. He was chosen afterward for a second term as mayor.

In August 2003, Shehu oversaw the burial of forty-three Albanians who had been killed in the Meja massacre during the Kosovo War. During the funeral, he said that the massacre had shaken the civilized world and called for the Serbian government to provide more information on missing Kosovars from the wartime period. The following year, Shehu took part in negotiations to allow twenty Ashkali and Roma families displaced by the war to return to Gjakova.

Shehu's last years as mayor were marked by controversy and political instability. The Gjakova municipal council voted to remove him from office in late 2005, but their decision was overturned by UNMIK. The details of this situation do not appear to be available online, but there is evidence that several prominent LDK members in Gjakova turned against Shehu in this period.

Kosovo introduced the direct election of mayors in 2007. Shehu ran for re-election as an independent candidate and fared poorly, finishing in eighth place with under two per cent of the vote. He has not returned to political life since this time.

== Electoral record ==
=== Local (Gjakova) ===
2007 Kosovan local elections: Mayor of Gjakova
Candidate	Party	First round		Second round	
Candidate	Party	Votes	%	Votes	%
Pal Lekaj	Alliance for the Future of Kosovo	12,409	37.98	19,185	56.39
Astrit Haraqija	Democratic League of Kosovo	7,789	23.84	14,836	43.61
Teuta Sahatqija	ORA	3,723	11.39		
Besnik Bardhi	New Kosovo Alliance	3,481	10.65		
Besim Mehmeti	Democratic League of Dardania	2,465	7.54		
Agim Jaka	Democratic Party of Kosovo	1,012	3.10		
Mentor Rruka	Alternative for Gjakova	809	2.48		
Aqif Shehu (incumbent)	Aqif Shehu	571	1.75		
Marjan Oroshi	Democratic Christian Party for Integration	414	1.27		
Total		32,673	100.00	34,021	100.00
