= Party of Albanian National Union =

Political party in Kosovo

The Party of Albanian National Union (UNIKOMB - Partia e Unitetit Kombëtar Shqiptar) is a political party in Kosovo. In documents relating to the 2004 Kosovo Assembly election, the Council of Europe listed UNIKOMB as the "Albanian National Unification Party" and as a separately certified political party, with Muharnet Kelmendi as its president.

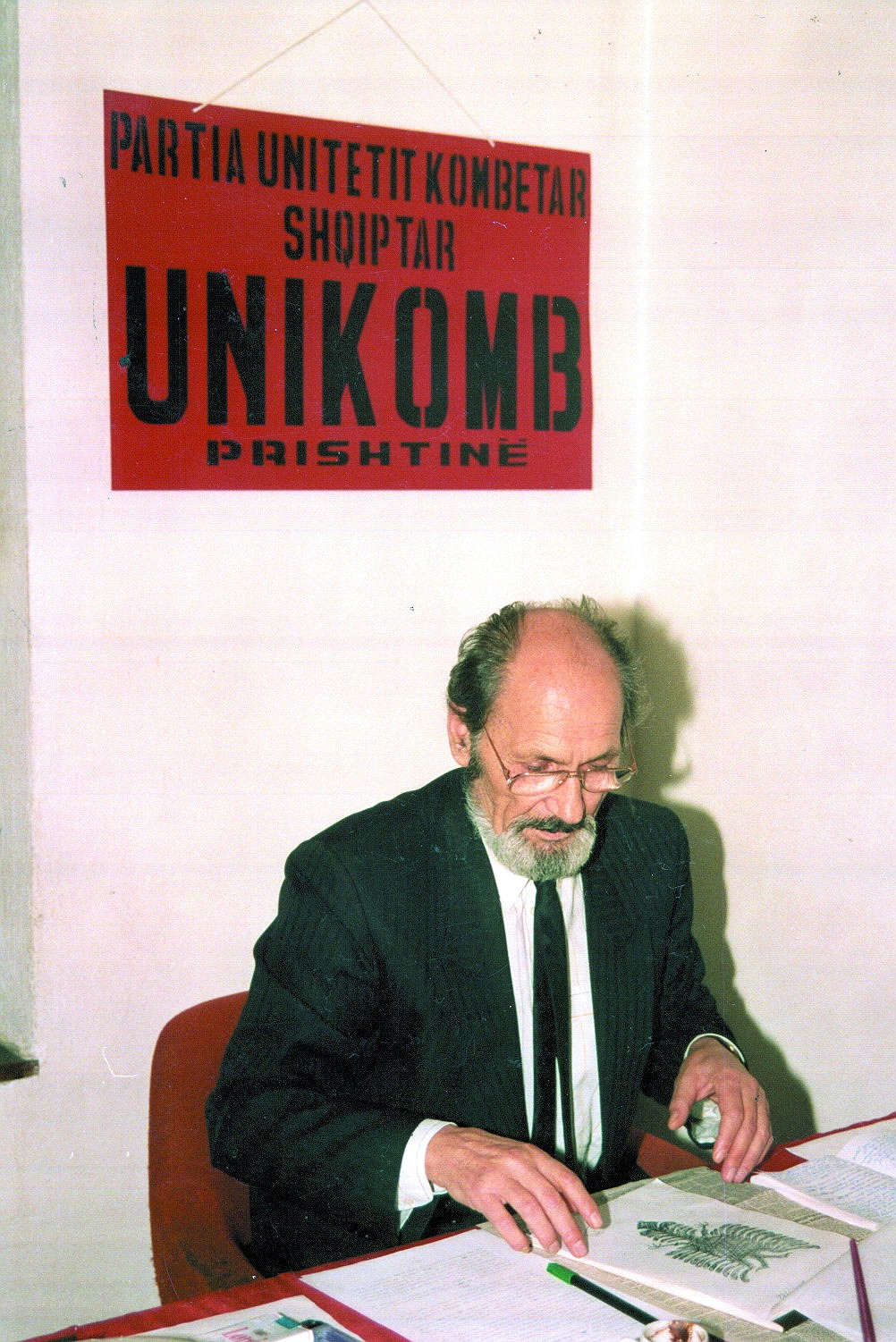

Halil Alidema served as president of UNIKOMB and led the party until his death in 1996.
