= Sylejman Sylejmani =

Albanian academic and politician

Sylejman Idriz Sylejmani
- Born: January 29, 1953; Brovinë, Gjakova, Yugoslavia
- Died: January 28, 2017 (aged 63)
- Occupations: Professor, academic, politician, activist, and military commander
- Years active: 1980–2017
- Known for: Politics, educational activism, military leadership
- Spouse: Fatime Sylejmani
- Children: 6

Sylejman Sylejmani (January 29, 1953 – January 28, 2017) was an Albanian academic, politician, military commander, and activist. He was a professor of chemistry at the University of Prishtina and served as the Education Minister of Gjakova. He also led the League of Albanian Educators (LASH) and was a co-founder of the Democratic League of Kosovo (LDK) and the Kosovo Liberation Army (KLA). Sylejmani participated in the Kosovo War and suffered from amyotrophic lateral sclerosis (ALS), reportedly as a result of torture endured during and prior to the conflict.

== Early life ==
Sylejmani was born on January 29, 1953, in Brovinë, Yugoslavia.

== Career and activism ==
Sylejmani became a key figure in the educational and political movements in Gjakova. He assumed leadership of LASH in 1994 during an institutional crisis, succeeding Feti Dashi. Under his leadership, LASH stabilized and continued to advocate for the Albanian education system, which faced significant suppression by Serbian authorities. Throughout his career, Sylejmani endured multiple arrests, raids, and physical abuse by Serbian security forces, including those led by Streten Camovic. Despite these challenges, he remained active in the education sector and political activism.

Under the FARK and the KLA,Sylejman Sylejmani initially joined the war effort by gathering finance and recruiting other intellectual figures to the army like Mark Malota and Gjergj Sokoli.On April the 20th 1998 Sylejman Sylejmani was made the chief operative and Commander of the 2nd Battalion of the KLA under Brigade 134 with the supreme command by Sali Cekaj where he led the fighting in Reka e keqes and led key operations of the Kosovo War such as the Defense of Smolica.

Sylejman Sylejmani started his fighting in the Kosovo War,during the attack on Dobrosh,Gjakova,Where the KLA commanded by Rifat Sylejmani and Sylejman Sylejmani managed to capture the village and set up the first regional KLA headquarters in the region of Gjakova as well as a KLA hospital in the village led by Afrim Sylejmani and Haxhi Kamberi which later became crucial for the major KLA confrontations such as the Battle of Junik and the Battle of Kosare.They then gathered locals and pushed forward capturing the villages of Nivokaz and Sheremet near Gjakova allowing the KLA to access Junik where Rifat Sylejmani and Sylejmani joined with commander Hysen Male Arifi to counterattack a Serbian Offensive against their entry into Junik in the village of Kallavaj resulting in the battle of Kallavaj to commence ending with a KLA victory.

In 2000-2007, Sylejmani served as the deputy mayor of Gjakova under Mayor Aqif Shehu, representing the LDK.

== Personal life ==
Sylejmani married Fatime Sylejmani, and the couple had six children.

=== Death ===
Sylejmani died on January 28, 2017.

== Recognition and legacy ==
During his funeral, President Fatmir Sejdiu praised his dedication and contributions to Kosovo’s liberation. In 2017, during the 27th anniversary of the LDK branch in Gjakova, Prime Minister Isa Mustafa and LDK leader Luan Gola posthumously honored Sylejmani for his activism and contributions to the party from 1990 to 2017.

His wife received a posthumous certificate of recognition from the Institution of Pedagogy in Kosova (IPK) and the Ministry of Education, Science, and Technology (MASHT) for his contributions from 2007 until his death.
