= Bislim Hoti =

Politician in Kosovo

Bislim Hoti (born 27 May 1959), whose first name is sometimes spelled Beslim, is a politician in Kosovo from the Balkan Egyptian community. He was the first leader of New Democratic Initiative of Kosovo (IRDK) and served in the Assembly of Kosovo from 2001 to 2007.

== Early life and career ==
Hoti was born in the village of Rogovë in the Gjakova municipality, in what was then the Autonomous Region of Kosovo and Metohija in the People's Republic of Serbia, Federal People's Republic of Yugoslavia. He attended a higher professional school of construction and worked in construction design.

== Politician ==
=== Early years ===
Hoti ran as an independent candidate in Gjakova for the 2000 Kosovan local elections. He was not elected.

The New Democratic Initiative of Kosovo was founded in March 2001; Hoti was among its founding members and was chosen as its first leader. Later in 2001, he represented Kosovo's Egyptian community in a delegation to Germany to study that country's municipal administration.

=== Parliamentarian ===
Hoti appeared in the lead position on the IRDK's electoral list in the 2001 Kosovan parliamentary election, which was held under closed list proportional representation, and was elected when the list won two seats. He served in the parliamentary group of the Alliance for the Future of Kosovo (AAK), was second vice-president of the assembly committee on emergency preparedness, and was a member of the committee on the rights and interests of communities and the committee on petitions and public requests.

He led the IRDK's list in the 2004 parliamentary election and was re-elected when the list again won two seats. He again served in the AAK's parliamentary group, was vice-president of the committee on the rules of procedure of the assembly, and was a member of the committee on the rights and interests of communities and for return. In January 2007, he was elected as a member of the assembly presidency.

The AAK participated in Kosovo's coalition governments between 2001 and 2007, and Hoti was a supporter of the administration in both his assembly terms. In 2005, he called for parties representing Kosovo's minority communities be included in negotiations on the status of Kosovo.

Xhevdet Neziraj succeeded Hoti as leader of the New Democratic Initiative of Kosovo in 2007. Kosovo adopted a system of open list proportional representation prior to the 2007 parliamentary election; Hoti appeared second on the party's list, received the second most votes of its candidates, and was not re-elected when the party fell to only one seat in the assembly.

=== Since 2007 ===
Hoti received the first position on the IRDK's list for Gjakova in the 2009 Kosovan local elections and was elected when the list won a single seat in the assembly. After the election, he served as deputy chair of the assembly for communities.

In late 2010, Hoti left the IRDK to establish the League of Egyptians of Kosovo (LEK). He appeared in the lead position on the party's electoral list in the 2010 Kosovan parliamentary election; the list did not cross the electoral threshold for assembly representation.

Hoti rejoined the IRDK on 20 July 2013 and once again appeared in the lead position on the party's list for Gjakova in the 2013 local elections. The list did not, on this occasion, win any seats in the assembly. He appeared second on the IRDK list in the 2014 parliamentary election, finished third among the party's candidates, and was not elected when the list won only one seat.

A candidate named Beslim Hoti appeared in the fourteenth position on the list of New Kosovo Alliance (AKR) for Gjakova in the 2017 Kosovan local elections. Online sources do not specify if this was the same person. The candidate finished in seventh place and was not elected when the list won one seat.
