= Ali Lajçi =

Kosovo politician (1955–2024)

Ali Lajçi (3 January 1955 – 28 April 2024) was a politician in Kosovo. He was the mayor of Peja from 2001 to 2007 and has served in the Assembly of the Republic of Kosovo. At different times in his career, Lajçi has been a member of the Democratic League of Kosovo (LDK), the Alliance for the Future of Kosovo (AAK), and Vetëvendosje (VV).

== Early life and activism ==
Lajçi was born to a Kosovo Albanian family in the village of Malaj in the Rugova region of the Peja municipality, in what was then the Autonomous Region of Kosovo and Metohija in the People's Republic of Serbia, Federal People's Republic of Yugoslavia. He was a prominent student organizer during the 1981 protests in Kosovo. Commenting on the protests more than three decades later, he said that organizers such as himself had openly called for a Republic of Kosovo, and he objected to Azem Vllasi's contention that they were motivated by Marxism-Leninism or were supported by Enver Hoxha's Albania.

Lajçi was arrested by Serbian authorities in 1981 for his role in the protests and was incarcerated until 1991. Amnesty International considered him a political prisoner.

== Politician ==
=== Democratic League of Kosovo ===
==== 1990s parallel institutions ====
Most Kosovo Albanians boycotted Serbian political institutions in the 1990s and operated within their own "parallel" structures. Lajçi was elected to Kosovo's parallel assembly in the 1992 Kosovan general election. In 1993, he was again arrested by Serbian authorities on charges of failure to report a crime; this related to suggestions that he was aware of the establishment of Albanian paramilitary units in Kosovo. He was released on 25 November 1993.

Lajçi sought re-election to the parallel assembly in 1998, although online sources do not clarify if he was successful. He was a member of the Democratic League of Kosovo in this period.

==== Mayor of Peja (2001–07) ====
Serbia lost effective control over most of Kosovo after the end of the Kosovo War (1998–99), and a new administration was established in the province under the United Nations Interim Administration Mission in Kosovo (UNMIK). Lajçi appeared in the twelfth position on the LDK's electoral list for Peja in the 2000 Kosovan local elections and received the most votes of any party candidate. The LDK won a majority of seats, and he was chosen as mayor when the local assembly convened in January 2001.

In March 2002, he indicated that Peja authorities would only support the return of Serb refugees to the area if Serbian authorities met various conditions, including the release of prisoners, information on missing persons, and the reconstruction of houses destroyed in the war. He also said that Serbs would need to "recognize the new reality in Kosova [Kosovo]" before his government could guarantee their security. On another occasion, he said that "hatred of the Albanians against the Serbs" in Peja was "more tenacious than elsewhere in Kosovo" and would take time to subside.

He appeared in the lead position on the LDK list for Peja in the 2002 local elections. The party won a significant plurality victory, and he was confirmed afterward for another term as mayor.

He condemned Serbian deputy prime minister Nebojša Čović's visit to Peja's Serb enclave of Goraždevac in 2003, saying the visit would incite local tensions and hinder his administration's efforts to "integrate all minorities in our society."

Lajçi withdrew his previous opposition to the construction of new homes for returning Serbs in 2004 and said that he would cooperate with UNMIK authorities on the project. In February 2005, he met with representatives of the local Serb refugee community. On this occasion, he reiterated his view that Serb returnees would need to integrate into the broader society of Kosovo.

In March 2007, Lajçi rejected any possibility of the Patriarchate of Peć receiving extraterritoriality status. Two months later, he attended a public meeting organized by the Vetëvendosje movement (which was not yet a political party) protesting the construction of a wall around the monastery. He refused to grant a licence for the wall, contending that it was on public land rather than church property.

==== LDK leadership contest (2006) ====
The LDK became divided into various factions after the death of party founder Ibrahim Rugova in January 2006. Lajçi was a declared candidate to become Rugova's successor but did not receive enough support to appear on the ballot at the party's December 2006 convention, which elected Fatmir Sejdiu as leader. A month before the leadership convention, a chaotic scene broke out at a LDK meeting in Peja when Lajçi had a verbal confrontation with Kosovo government minister Melihate Tërmkolli over the credentials and family connections of some LDK delegates. Some of Lajçi's supporters at one point threatened Tërmkolli, who was protected by her bodyguards and had to be escorted from the building.

==== Assembly member (2007–11) ====
Lajçi appeared in the eighth position on the LDK's electoral list for the 2007 Kosovan parliamentary election, which was the first to be held under open list proportional representation. He finished eleventh among the party's candidates and was elected when the list won twenty-five seats. The Democratic Party of Kosovo (PDK) won the election and formed a coalition government with the LDK, and Lajçi served as a government supporter. He was a member of the committee on public administration, local government, and media, and the committee on agriculture, forestry, rural development, and environmental spatial planning. He was a sitting member of the assembly in February 2008, when Kosovo unilaterally declared independence from Serbia.

Lajçi had a fraught relationship with the LDK leadership in these years. He addressed several criticisms to the LDK presidency in October 2008, when Blerim Kuçi resigned as the party's chief executive officer on Sejdiu's request. In June 2010, Lajçi signed a petition from the Alliance for the Future of Kosovo calling for an investigation into whether Sejdiu was violating Kosovo's constitution by simultaneously holding office as Kosovo president and LDK leader. There was media speculation in this period that Lajçi would himself join the AAK.

These rumours notwithstanding, Lajçi remained in the LDK for the 2010 parliamentary election, appearing in the twenty-second position on its electoral list. He finished in thirty-second place and was not re-elected when the list won twenty-seven seats.

Lajçi resigned from the LDK in July 2011, describing the party leadership as "communists."

=== Alliance for the Future of Kosovo ===
Lajçi joined the Alliance for the Future of Kosovo in June 2012. He was given the tenth position on the party's list in the 2014 parliamentary election but finished fifty-first among its candidates and was not elected when the list won eleven seats. The overall results of the election were inconclusive: the PDK won the greatest number of seats but not initially able to form a functional coalition government. The AAK tried to establish a government in alliance with the LDK, Vetëvendosje, and the Civic Initiative for Kosovo (NISMA). Lajçi opposed this initiative and withdrew from party activities, although he did not at the time leave the AAK. The alliance ultimately dissolved before it could assume government, and the PDK reached a new coalition agreement with the LDK.

Lajçi served on the Republic of Kosovo's commission reviewing a border demarcation agreement with Montenegro. He strongly opposed the PDK–LDK government's final settlement on the border, claiming that Kosovo would lose about ten thousand hectares of land. He also objected to the United States Department of State's support for the agreement, describing the department's public intervention on the matter as a "political declaration coordinated between the clans of idiots in the [Republic of Kosovo] government and the State Department."

=== Vetëvendosje ===
==== Return to parliament (2017–19) ====
Lajçi left the AAK in May 2017 to join Vetëvendosje. He appeared in the thirty-fifth position on the party's list in the 2017 parliamentary election, finished fifteenth, and was elected when the list won thirty-two seats. The PDK and AAK formed government after the election, and Vetëvendosje served in opposition. Lajçi was a member of the budget and finance committee and the committee for the supervision of public finances.

In December 2018, Lajçi was one of several self-described European socialist and progressive parliamentarians who signed a letter to Jeremy Corbyn, then the leader of the United Kingdom's Labour Party, urging him to defeat Brexit and "spearhead the movement for progressive change in Europe."

Lajçi appeared in the thirty-eighth position on Vetëvendosje's list for the 2019 parliamentary election, fell to seventy-third place, and was not re-elected when the list won twenty-nine seats.

==== Since 2019 ====
Lajçi argued against the creation of a Community of Serb Municipalities in December 2023, saying that the 2013 Brussels Agreement and 2023 Ohrid Agreement are not legally binding documents.
