= Privatisation Agency of Kosovo =

Kosovo government agency

The Privatisation Agency of Kosovo (PAK) is a Kosovo government agency. In May 2021, Kosovo MPs voted to dismiss its board.
