= 2002 Kosovan local elections =

Local elections were held throughout Kosovo on 26 October 2002, organized by the Organization for Security and Co-operation in Europe (OSCE) and the United Nations Interim Administration Mission in Kosovo (UNMIK). This was the second local electoral cycle held in Kosovo after the start of the UNMIK mandate in 1999.

In each municipality, elections were held for municipal assemblies under a system of proportional representation. The elected representatives in each jurisdiction were responsible for choosing an assembly president, who held the rank of mayor. (Beginning with the next local electoral cycle in 2007, mayors were directly elected.)

The Serb community, which had generally boycotted the last round of local voting in 2000, participated in the vote in five predominantly Serb municipalities: Zubin Potok, Zvečan, Leposavić, Novo Brdo, and Štrpce.

In northern Kosovska Mitrovica, Serbs generally abstained from voting. Milan Ivanović, the leader of the Serbian National Council in northern Kosovo, said that UNMIK had not provided any guarantees that the Kosovska Mitrovica municipal administration would be decentralized, nor had it created adequate security and institutional conditions for Serb participation. He added that the Serb community was not boycotting elections in Kosovska Mitrovica as such, but was rather giving the international community the opportunity to organize new elections once certain conditions had been met.

In the rest of the province, Serb participation in the electoral process was minimal.

In November 2002, the Serbian government agreed to give UNMIK direct control over the municipal government of northern Kosovska Mitrovica on a provisional basis.

== Results ==
=== Gjakova District ===
==== Gjakova ====
Party	Votes	%	Seats
Democratic League of Kosovo	15,540	39.97	17
Alliance for the Future of Kosovo	9,038	23.24	10
Albanian Christian Democratic Party of Kosovo	4,909	12.63	5
Democratic Union of Gjakova	2,881	7.41	3
Democratic Party of Kosovo	2,772	7.13	3
New Democratic Initiative of Kosovo	1,411	3.63	2
Liberal Party of Kosovo	834	2.14	1
Coalition "Return"	435	1.12	–
Social Democratic Party of Kosovo	229	0.59	–
Ashkali Albanian Democratic Party of Kosovo	184	0.47	–
Albanian National Democratic Party	180	0.46	–
People's Movement of Kosovo	157	0.40	–
Civic Initiative "Of the Roma of Kosovo"	107	0.28	–
National Movement for the Liberation of Kosovo	99	0.25	–
Bosniak Party of Democratic Action of Kosovo	54	0.14	–
Vatan	52	0.13	–
Total	38,882	100.00	41

Incumbent mayor Aqif Shehu of the Democratic League of Kosovo was confirmed for another term in office after the election. The Gjakova municipal council voted to remove Shehu from office in late 2005, but their decision was overturned by the United Nations Interim Administration Mission in Kosovo (UNMIK). Shehu appears to have broken with the local LDK leadership during this term.

==== Deçan ====
Party	Votes	%	Seats
Democratic League of Kosovo	9,210	48.64	15
Alliance for the Future of Kosovo	8,674	45.81	15
Democratic Party of Kosovo	606	3.20	1
Albanian Christian Democratic Party of Kosovo	195	1.03	–
New Party of Kosovo	84	0.44	–
Liberal Party of Kosovo	81	0.43	–
National Movement for the Liberation of Kosovo	44	0.23	–
People's Movement of Kosovo	41	0.22	–
Total	18,935	100.00	31

Ibrahim Selmanaj of the Alliance for the Future of Kosovo became mayor after the election. He resigned in 2005 after being appointed as a minister in the Kosovo government and was replaced by Nazmi Selmanaj of the same party.

==== Rahovec ====
Party	Votes	%	Seats
Democratic League of Kosovo	9,776	48.80	15
Democratic Party of Kosovo	6,408	31.99	10
Alliance for the Future of Kosovo	1,826	9.11	3
Coalition "Return"	610	3.04	1
Justice Party	609	3.04	1
People's Movement of Kosovo	327	1.63	1
New Democratic Initiative of Kosovo	171	0.85	–
National Movement for the Liberation of Kosovo	147	0.73	–
Liberal Party of Kosovo	104	0.52	–
Civic Initiative "Of Kosovo"	55	0.27	–
Total	20,033	100.00	31

Incumbent mayor Esad Haxhijaha of the Democratic League of Kosovo was confirmed for a new term in office after the election. He later joined the breakaway Democratic League of Dardania.

=== Mitrovica District ===
==== Leposavić ====
Party	Votes	%	Seats
Democratic Party of Serbia	992	25.00	5
Civic Initiative "Socialist Leposavić for Kosmet in Serbia"	768	19.35	3
Serbian National Council of Northern Kosmet	717	18.07	3
Coalition "Return"	530	13.36	2
Serbian Renewal Movement	312	7.86	1
Civic Initiative "For Return and Reconciliation"	217	5.47	1
Veselin Radović	182	4.59	1
Coalition "Together"	139	3.50	1
Social Democracy	65	1.64	–
Civic Initiative "Of the Roma of Kosovo"	46	1.16	–
Total	3,968	100.00	17

Velimir Bojović of the Democratic Party of Serbia was chosen as mayor after the election.

==== Mitrovica ====
Party	Votes	%	Seats
Democratic League of Kosovo	16,516	53.48	23
Democratic Party of Kosovo	10,562	34.20	15
Alliance for the Future of Kosovo	1,763	5.71	2
Justice Party	391	1.27	1
Vatan	280	0.91	–
Turkish Democratic Party of Kosovo	229	0.74	–
Liberal Party of Kosovo	138	0.45	–
Coalition "Return"	134	0.43	–
Democratic Ashkali Party of Kosovo	123	0.40	–
People's Movement of Kosovo	122	0.40	–
Serbian National Council of Northern Kosmet	104	0.34	–
Green Party of Kosovo	101	0.33	–
Balli Kombëtar	88	0.28	–
Civic Initiative "Of Kosovo"	78	0.25	–
Democratic Party of Serbia	72	0.23	–
Social Democratic Party of Kosovo	68	0.22	–
National Movement for the Liberation of Kosovo	66	0.21	–
Party of Albanian National Union	39	0.13	–
Civic Initiative "Of the Roma of Kosovo"	11	0.04	–
Total	30,885	100.00	41

Incumbent mayor Faruk Spahija of the Democratic League of Kosovo was confirmed for another term in office after the election. He died of cancer in October 2005 and was replaced by Mursel Ibrahimi of the same party.

==== Skenderaj ====
Party	Votes	%	Seats
Democratic Party of Kosovo	15,601	81.63	26
Democratic League of Kosovo	2,352	12.31	4
New Party of Kosovo	529	2.77	1
Alliance for the Future of Kosovo	194	1.02	–
Balli Kombëtar	135	0.71	–
Liberal Party of Kosovo	114	0.60	–
Party of Albanian National Union	84	0.44	–
Albanian National Democratic Party	47	0.25	–
Coalition "Return"	45	0.24	–
Civic Initiative "Srbica"	11	0.06	–
Total	19,112	100.00	31

Incumbent mayor Ramadan Gashi of the Democratic Party of Kosovo was confirmed for another term in office after the election.

==== Vushtrri ====
Party	Votes	%	Seats
Democratic League of Kosovo	14,538	57.12	18
Democratic Party of Kosovo	8,029	31.55	10
Alliance for the Future of Kosovo	1,362	5.35	2
Justice Party	418	1.64	1
Liberal Party of Kosovo	209	0.82	–
Coalition "Return"	186	0.73	–
Social Democratic Party of Kosovo	144	0.57	–
Albanian Republican Party	140	0.55	–
People's Movement of Kosovo	113	0.44	–
National Movement for the Liberation of Kosovo	111	0.44	–
Democratic Party of Serbia	99	0.39	–
Party of Albanian National Union	87	0.34	–
Movement for Kosovo and Metohija	16	0.06	–
Total	25,452	100.00	31

Incumbent mayor Muharrem Shabani of the Democratic League of Kosovo was confirmed for another term in office after the election.

==== Zubin Potok ====
Party	Votes	%	Seats
Democratic Party of Serbia	1,868	45.80	8
Civic Initiative "Socijalisti Kolašina"	810	19.86	4
Survival Zubin Potok	308	7.55	1
Democratic League of Kosovo	221	5.42	1
Democratic Party of Kosovo	160	3.92	1
Civic Initiative "Kolašin"	160	3.92	1
Coalition "Return"	151	3.70	1
Stojan Perović	99	2.43	–
Civic Initiative "Better Life"	88	2.16	–
Social Democracy	73	1.79	–
Alliance for the Future of Kosovo	72	1.77	–
Radovan Kostić	42	1.03	–
Miroslav Radisavljević	27	0.66	–
Total	4,079	100.00	17

Incumbent mayor Slaviša Ristić of the Democratic Party of Serbia was confirmed for another term in office after the election.

==== Zvečan ====
Party	Votes	%	Seats
Serbian National Council of Northern Kosmet	1,066	34.54	6
Democratic Party of Serbia	927	30.04	5
Social Democracy	423	13.71	2
Coalition "Return"	362	11.73	2
Serbian Renewal Movement	308	9.98	2
Total	3,086	100.00	17

Dragiša Milović of the Democratic Party of Serbia was chosen as mayor after the election. Milan Ivanović of the Serbian National Council served as deputy mayor.

=== Peja District ===
==== Peja ====
Party	Votes	%	Seats
Democratic League of Kosovo	20,367	45.84	19
Alliance for the Future of Kosovo	13,470	30.32	12
Democratic Party of Kosovo	4,143	9.32	4
Coalition "Return"	1,179	2.65	1
Vatan	1,097	2.47	1
New Democratic Initiative of Kosovo	668	1.50	1
Albanian Christian Democratic Party of Kosovo	661	1.49	1
Riza Lluka	614	1.38	1
Bosniak Democratic Initiative of Kosovo Husnija Bešković	585	1.32	1
Justice Party	313	0.70	–
Civic Initiative "Goraždevac"	230	0.52	–
United Roma Party of Kosovo	230	0.52	–
Liberal Party of Kosovo	181	0.41	–
Party of Albanian National Union	162	0.36	–
Civic Initiative "Of the Roma of Kosovo"	148	0.33	–
Bosniak Party of Democratic Action of Kosovo	128	0.29	–
People's Movement of Kosovo	110	0.25	–
Social Democratic Party of Kosovo	77	0.17	–
Ramë Dreshaj	66	0.15	–
Total	44,429	100.00	41

Incumbent mayor Ali Lajçi of the Democratic League of Kosovo was confirmed for another term in office after the election.

==== Istog ====
Party	Votes	%	Seats
Democratic League of Kosovo	10,755	59.44	18
Democratic Party of Kosovo	3,289	18.18	6
Alliance for the Future of Kosovo	1,740	9.62	3
Coalition "Return"	557	3.08	1
New Democratic Initiative of Kosovo	398	2.20	1
Vatan	358	1.98	1
Albanian Christian Democratic Party of Kosovo	318	1.76	1
New Party of Kosovo	149	0.82	–
Tijanić Obrad	135	0.75	–
Liberal Party of Kosovo	99	0.55	–
Bosniak Party of Democratic Action of Kosovo	97	0.54	–
People's Movement of Kosovo	78	0.43	–
Balli Kombëtar	68	0.38	–
National Movement for the Liberation of Kosovo	52	0.29	–
Total	18,093	100.00	31

Incumbent mayor Fadil Ferati of the Democratic League of Kosovo was confirmed for another term in office after the election.

==== Klina ====
Party	Votes	%	Seats
Democratic League of Kosovo	6,467	39.96	13
Democratic Party of Kosovo	5,226	32.29	10
Alliance for the Future of Kosovo	1,834	11.33	4
Albanian Christian Democratic Party of Kosovo	1,367	8.45	3
Coalition "Return"	608	3.76	1
New Democratic Initiative of Kosovo	205	1.27	–
People's Movement of Kosovo	196	1.21	–
Liberal Party of Kosovo	153	0.95	–
Party of Albanian National Union	79	0.49	–
Balli Kombëtar	50	0.31	–
Total	16,185	100.00	31

Incumbent mayor Ramë Manaj of the Democratic League of Kosovo was confirmed for another term in office after the election. He resigned in 2006 and was replaced by Prenkë Gjetaj.
