= Gllarevë =

Gllarevë: Gllarevë (Albanian); Игларево/Iglarevo (Serbian)
- Village
- Location in Kosovo
- Location: Kosovo
- District: Pejë
- Municipality: Klinë

Population (2024)
  - Total: 1,419
- Time zone: UTC+1 (Central European Time)
  - Summer (DST): UTC+2 (CEST)

Gllarevë (Serbian: Игларево/Iglarevo, Albanian: Gllarevë) is a village in the Klina municipality, Kosovo.
