= 2001 Kosovan parliamentary election =

- 17 November 2001
- All 120 seats in the Assembly; 61 seats needed for a majority
- Turnout: 64.30%
Party	Leader	Vote %	Seats	+/–
LDK	Ibrahim Rugova	45.65	47	
PDK	Hashim Thaçi	25.70	26	
AAK	Ramush Haradinaj	7.83	8	
LKÇK	Fatmir Humolli	1.11	1	
PSHDK	Mark Krasniqi	0.98	1	
PD	Sylejman Çerkezi	0.57	1	
LPK	Bedrush Çollaku	0.56	1	
Minority lists (35 seats) (Note: 20 seats were reserved for minorities (10 for Serbs and 10 for other minorities) but minority parties can win more than 20 based on election results)
Return Coalition	Gojko Savić	11.34	22	
Vatan Coalition	Zehra Elezi	1.15	4	
KDTP	Mahir Yagcilar	1.00	3	
IRDK	Bislim Hoti	0.50	2	
PDASHK	Sabit Rrahmani	0.43	2	
BPDAK	Hilmo Kandić	0.37	1	
PREBK	Zylfi Merxha	0.34	1	
This lists parties that won seats. See the complete results below.
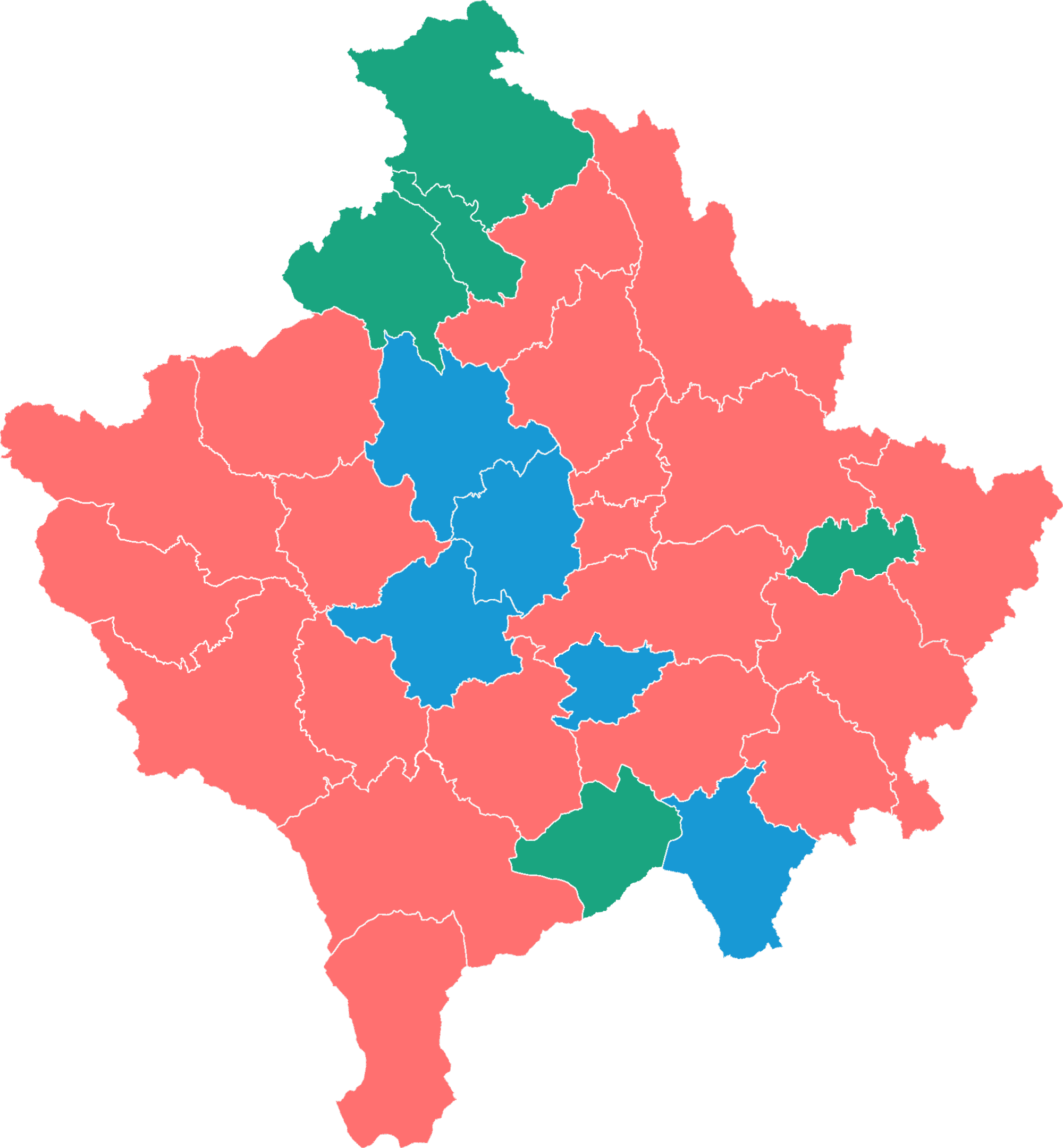
Most voted-for party by municipality
LDK PDK Return Coalition
Prime Minister after
Bajram Rexhepi; PDK

Parliamentary elections were held in UN-administered Kosovo on 17 November 2001. They were the first elections for the Transitional Assembly of Kosovo following the establishment of the United Nations Interim Administration (UNMIK) in 1999. The elections were organised and supervised by UNMIK and the OSCE Mission in Kosovo and were monitored by the Council of Europe Mission in Kosovo.

== Results ==
Party	Votes	%	Seats
Democratic League of Kosovo	359,851	45.65	47
Democratic Party of Kosovo	202,622	25.70	26
Return Coalition	89,388	11.34	22
Alliance for the Future of Kosovo	61,688	7.83	8
Vatan Coalition (SDA–DRSM–GIG)	9,030	1.15	4
National Movement for the Liberation of Kosovo	8,725	1.11	1
Turkish Democratic Party of Kosovo	7,879	1.00	3
Albanian Christian Democratic Party of Kosovo	7,701	0.98	1
Justice Party	4,504	0.57	1
People's Movement of Kosovo	4,404	0.56	1
New Democratic Initiative of Kosovo	3,976	0.50	2
Liberal Party of Kosovo	3,600	0.46	0
Albanian Ashkali Democratic Party of Kosovo	3,411	0.43	2
Bosniak Party of Democratic Action of Kosovo	2,906	0.37	1
Albanian National Front Party	2,881	0.37	0
United Roma Party of Kosovo	2,717	0.34	1
Liberal Centre Party of Kosovo	2,403	0.30	0
Green Party of Kosovo	2,325	0.29	0
Social Democratic Party of Kosovo	1,785	0.23	0
Xhevdet Rexhaj	1,330	0.17	0
Latif Kryeziu	1,199	0.15	0
Xun Çetta	1,210	0.15	0
Albanian National Democratic Party	1,066	0.14	0
Republican Party of Kosovo	643	0.08	0
Civil Initiative of Kosovo	631	0.08	0
Albanian Liberal Party	428	0.05	0
Total	788,303	100.00	120
Valid votes	788,303	98.07	
Invalid/blank votes	15,493	1.93	
Total votes	803,796	100.00	
Registered voters/turnout	1,249,987	64.30	
Source: KQZ
