= Green Party of Kosovo =

Green Party of Kosovo Partia e të Gjelbërve të Kosovës
- Leader: Daut Maloku
- Founded: 7 September 1991;34 years ago
- Headquarters: Pristina
- Ideology: Green politics Environmentalism Grassroots Democracy Pro-Europeanism
- Political position: Centre-Left

Website
- http://www.pgjk.org

The Green Party of Kosovo (Albanian: Partia e të Gjelbërve të Kosovës, PGJK) was a green party in Kosovo. The party supported an environmentally clean Kosovo and its continual existence as an independent state.

The Green Party of Kosovo (PGJK) was removed from the official registry of political parties by the Central Election Commission (CEC) on 4 December 2019. It was executed under Article 8 of CEC Rule No. 01/2013 because the party, which had originally registered on August 21, 2000, failed to seek certification or participate in three consecutive election cycles. (2014, 2017 and 2019 elections).

== History ==
The party was established in September 1991, when Kosovo was part of Yugoslavia. Its leader was Daut Maloku.

== Chairman of the PGJK, 1991–present ==
#	President	Term start	Term end	Time in office
1	Daut Maloku	7 September 1991	Incumbent	35 years, 52 days

== See also ==
- Green party
- Green politics
- List of environmental organizations
