= Serbian List for Kosovo and Metohija =

Serbian Kosovar political party

The Serbian List for Kosovo and Metohija (Serbian: Српска листа за Косово и Метохију, Srpska lista za Kosovo i Metohiju) is a Serbian political party in Kosovo. At the last legislative elections, 24 October 2004, the party won 0.2% of the popular vote and 8 out of 120 seats. In the Assembly of Kosovo 10 seats are reserved for ethnic Serbian politicians. Despite the low number of votes - due to a low Serbian turnout -the Serbian List is one of the main parliamentary parties in Kosovo.

Kosovo Serbs formed the Serbian List for Kosovo and Metohija (SLKM) in 2004 and won several seats, but have boycotted Kosovo's institutions and never taken their seats in the Kosovo Assembly.
