= 2000 Kosovan local elections =

Local elections were held throughout Kosovo on 28 October 2000, organized by the Organization for Security and Co-operation in Europe (OSCE) and the United Nations Interim Administration Mission in Kosovo (UNMIK). This was the first local electoral cycle held in Kosovo after the start of the UNMIK mandate in 1999.

In each municipality, elections were held for municipal assemblies under a system of proportional representation. The elected representatives in each jurisdiction were responsible for choosing an assembly president, who held the rank of mayor.

The Serb community of Kosovo generally boycotted the vote. Local Serb leaders expressed concern that security conditions had not improved to the point where Serbs could safely return to their homes; Dragiša Milović, acting as a spokesperson for Oliver Ivanović, said that Serbs in northern Kosovo would "[would] not register or take part in the vote until Serbs start returning to Kosovo in bigger numbers." A Council of Europe report indicated that Serb non-participation was the "main drawback of the elections," blaming the situation in part on "pressure brought to bear by Belgrade." The fall of Slobodan Milošević's government, which took place in the middle of the campaign, was described as occurring too late to effect any change in this situation.

== Results ==
=== Gjakova District ===
==== Gjakova ====
Party	Votes	%	Seats
Democratic League of Kosovo	24,928	59.66	26
Alliance for the Future of Kosovo	7,031	16.83	7
Albanian Christian Democratic Party of Kosovo	3,938	9.42	4
Democratic Party of Kosovo	3,010	7.20	3
Liberal Party of Kosovo	856	2.05	1
Liberal Center Party of Kosovo	444	1.06	–
Liberal Democratic Party of Kosovo	267	0.64	–
Green Party of Kosovo	264	0.63	–
Bislim Hoti	206	0.49	–
Bosniak Party of Democratic Action of Kosovo	187	0.45	–
National-Democratic Front Party of Kosovo	158	0.38	–
Social Democratic Party of Kosovo	154	0.37	–
Hasan Sadriu	103	0.25	–
Avdullah Qafani	99	0.24	–
Skender Korenica	52	0.12	–
Coalition for Independence	47	0.11	–
Social Democratic Union	42	0.10	–
Total	41,786	100.00	41

Aqif Shehu of the Democratic League of Kosovo was chosen as mayor after the election. With Sylejman Sylejmani as the deputy Mayor.

==== Deçan ====
Party	Votes	%	Seats
Democratic League of Kosovo	10,136	60.44	19
Alliance for the Future of Kosovo	5,552	33.11	10
Democratic Party of Kosovo	881	5.25	2
Republican Party of Kosovo	135	0.81	–
Coalition for Independence	66	0.39	–
Total	16,770	100.00	31

Mehmet Bojkaj of the Democratic League of Kosovo was chosen as mayor after the election.

==== Rahovec ====
Party	Votes	%	Seats
Democratic League of Kosovo	14,884	61.33	20
Democratic Party of Kosovo	4,908	20.22	6
Alliance for the Future of Kosovo	3,680	15.16	5
Liberal Center Party of Kosovo	337	1.39	–
Albanian National Democratic Party	144	0.59	–
Liberal Party of Kosovo	140	0.58	–
Social Democratic Party of Kosovo	126	0.52	–
Coalition for Independence	49	0.20	–
Total	24,268	100.00	31

Esad Haxhijaha of the Democratic League of Kosovo was chosen as mayor after the election.

=== Mitrovica District ===
==== Leposavić ====
Party	Seats
Democratic League of Kosovo	–
Alliance for the Future of Kosovo	–
Total	–

The results in Leposavić, a predominantly Serb community, were not certified due to low turnout. No Serb parties participated in the election.

==== Mitrovica ====
Party	Votes	%	Seats
Democratic League of Kosovo	21,785	67.32	29
Democratic Party of Kosovo	7,784	24.05	11
Alliance for the Future of Kosovo	996	3.08	1
Bosniak Party of Democratic Action of Kosovo	235	0.73	–
Party of Democratic Action	175	0.54	–
Albanian Republican Party	175	0.54	–
Republican Party of Kosovo	162	0.50	–
Green Party of Kosovo	137	0.42	–
Liberal Center Party of Kosovo	132	0.41	–
Coalition for Independence	117	0.36	–
Civic Initiative "Independents of Mitrovica"	116	0.36	–
Liberal Party of Kosovo	108	0.33	–
Mitrovica Turkish Community	105	0.32	–
Democratic Ashkali Party of Kosovo	99	0.31	–
Social Democratic Party of Kosovo	94	0.29	–
Albanian National Democratic Movement	74	0.23	–
Social Democratic Union	44	0.14	–
Kosovo Turkish People's Party	24	0.07	–
Total	32,362	100.00	41

Faruk Spahija of the Democratic League of Kosovo was chosen as mayor after the election.

==== Skenderaj ====
Party	Votes	%	Seats
Democratic Party of Kosovo	18,108	84.03	27
Democratic League of Kosovo	2,895	13.43	4
Albanian National Democratic Movement	186	0.86	–
Albanian National Democratic Party	131	0.61	–
Alliance for the Future of Kosovo	99	0.46	–
Democratic National Front Party	67	0.31	–
Social Democratic Party of Kosovo	63	0.29	–
Total	21,549	100.00	31

Ramadan Gashi of the Democratic Party of Kosovo was chosen as mayor after the election.

==== Vushtrri ====
Party	Votes	%	Seats
Democratic League of Kosovo	16,652	63.94	20
Democratic Party of Kosovo	7,154	27.47	9
Alliance for the Future of Kosovo	1,366	5.25	2
Republican Party of Kosovo	211	0.81	–
Social Democratic Party of Kosovo	182	0.70	–
Coalition for Independence	176	0.68	–
Liberal Party of Kosovo	141	0.54	–
Albanian Republican Party	126	0.48	–
Kosovo Turkish People's Party	34	0.13	–
Total	26,042	100.00	31

Hajzer Krasniqi of the Democratic League of Kosovo was chosen as mayor after the election. Krasniqi was required to resign for health reasons in later in the year and was replaced by Muharrem Shabani, also of the Democratic League of Kosovo.

==== Zubin Potok ====
Party	Seats
Democratic League of Kosovo	–
Total	–

The results in Zubin Potok, a predominantly Serb community, were not certified due to low turnout. No Serb parties participated in the election.

==== Zvečan ====
Party	Seats
Alliance for the Future of Kosovo	–
Total	–

The results in Zvečan, a predominantly Serb community, were not certified due to low turnout. No Serb parties participated in the election.

=== Peja District ===
==== Peja ====
Party	Votes	%	Seats
Democratic League of Kosovo	28,352	65.13	28
Alliance for the Future of Kosovo	7,729	17.75	8
Democratic Party of Kosovo	4,475	10.28	4
Party of Democratic Action	1,239	2.85	1
Albanian Christian Democratic Party of Kosovo	427	0.98	–
Bosniak Party of Democratic Action of Kosovo	286	0.66	–
Liberal Party of Kosovo	157	0.36	–
Liberal Democratic Party of Kosovo	153	0.35	–
National-Democratic Front Party of Kosovo	146	0.34	–
Republican Party of Kosovo	137	0.31	–
Green Party of Kosovo	112	0.26	–
Albanian National Democratic Party	93	0.21	–
Liberal Center Party of Kosovo	88	0.20	–
Social Democratic Party of Kosovo	70	0.16	–
Social Democratic Union	47	0.11	–
Coalition for Independence	21	0.05	–
Total	43,532	100.00	41

Ali Lajçi of the Democratic League of Kosovo was chosen as mayor after the election. UNMIK leader Bernard Kouchner appointed Božidar Krstić to the municipal assembly as a representative of Peja's Serb community.

==== Istog ====
Party	Votes	%	Seats
Democratic League of Kosovo	12,721	70.46	22
Democratic Party of Kosovo	2,931	16.23	5
Alliance for the Future of Kosovo	1,630	9.03	3
Party of Democratic Action	453	2.51	1
Albanian Christian Democratic Party of Kosovo	236	1.31	–
Liberal Party of Kosovo	83	0.46	–
Total	18,054	100.00	31

Fadil Ferati of the Democratic League of Kosovo was chosen as mayor after the election.

==== Klina ====
Party	Votes	%	Seats
Democratic League of Kosovo	8,334	52.03	17
Democratic Party of Kosovo	5,112	31.92	10
Alliance for the Future of Kosovo	1,186	7.40	2
Albanian Christian Democratic Party of Kosovo	954	5.96	2
Liberal Party of Kosovo	243	1.52	–
Liberal Center Party of Kosovo	115	0.72	–
Coalition for Independence	73	0.46	–
Total	16,017	100.00	31

Ismet Rraci of the Democratic League of Kosovo was chosen as mayor after the election. He was assassinated by unknown parties in April 2001. Ramë Manaj, also of the Democratic League of Kosovo, was chosen as his successor.

== Subsequent developments ==
Following the results, and in light of the Serb boycott, UNMIK leader Bernard Kouchner said that he would appoint Serb representatives to municipal assemblies in the predominantly Serb areas. Objections were raised by some community leaders, including the serving mayors of Leposavić, Zubin Potok, Zvečan, and Kosovska Mitrovica (as chosen by municipal assemblies elected in the 1996 Serbian local elections). Notwithstanding this, UNMIK was able to establish functional local assemblies in Leposavić, Zubin Potok, and Zvečan, which in turn selected new mayors in their communities.

Nenad Radosavljević, who had previously led the Serbian National Council in Leposavić, became mayor in that community. He stood down from the role later in 2001. Online sources do not indicate if anyone was formally appointed as his successor prior to the 2002 local elections; Nebojša Radulović served as deputy mayor and may also have been acting mayor.

In Zubin Potok, Slaviša Ristić of the Democratic Party of Serbia was selected by the local assembly as mayor.

Desimir Petković, who had served as mayor of Zvečan prior to the 2000 elections, was confirmed for another term in office afterwards.

The situation in northern Kosovska Mitrovica was different, as it was not recognized by UNMIK as a separate municipality. The Serbian government continued to recognize the pre-war municipal administration led by Nikola Radović until 2002, although its authority was for a time eclipsed by the local Serbian National Council led by Oliver Ivanović. Ivanović left the SNV in 2001, at which time its influence in civil government declined.

In November 2002, the Serbian government agreed to give UNMIK direct control over the municipal government of northern Kosovska Mitrovica on a provisional basis. Radović gave his support to the initiative. The board held its first meeting on 30 May 2003.
