= Liberal Party of Kosovo =

Liberal Party of Kosovo Partia Liberale e Kosoves
- Leader: Gjergj Dedaj
- Headquarters: Pristina, Kosovo
- Ideology: Liberalism
- Political position: Centre
- European affiliation: Alliance of Liberals and Democrats for Europe Party
- International affiliation: Liberal International
- Colours: Brown, Black, Red, Yellow

Website
- Official Website

The Liberal Party of Kosovo (Albanian: Partia Liberale e Kosoves) is a liberal political party in the Republic of Kosovo.

The party is an observer member of the Liberal International and a member of the Alliance of Liberals and Democrats for Europe Party.

In the 2004 parliamentary election, the party won 0.5% of the popular vote and 1 out of 190 seats in the Assembly of Kosovo. However, in the 2007 parliamentary election, it failed to pass the election threshold of 5%, thus becoming a non-parliamentary party. Like all other Kosovo Albanian political parties, the party supports Kosovo independence and does not take part in the general elections in Serbia nor any other election or referendum organised by the Serbian parliament. The current president of the Liberal Party of Kosovo is Gjergj Dedaj.

== See also ==
- Liberalism
- Contributions to liberal theory
- Liberalism worldwide
- List of liberal parties
- Liberal democracy
