= 2004 Kosovan parliamentary election =

- 24 October 2004
- All 120 seats in the Assembly; 61 seats needed for a majority
- Turnout: 49.52% (▼14.78pp)
| Party | Leader | Vote % | Seats | +/– |
|---|---|---|---|---|
| LDK | Ibrahim Rugova | 45.42 | 47 | 0 |
| PDK | Hashim Thaçi | 28.85 | 30 | +4 |
| AAK | Ramush Haradinaj | 8.39 | 9 | +1 |
| PR ORA | Veton Surroi | 6.23 | 7 | New |
| PSHDK | Mark Krasniqi | 1.80 | 2 | +1 |
| PD | Sylejman Çerkezi | 1.02 | 1 | 0 |
| LPK | Emrush Xhemajli | 0.66 | 1 | 0 |
| PLK | Gjergj Dedaj | 0.51 | 1 | +1 |
Minority seats (Note: Twenty seats were reserved for minorities but minority parties could win more than 20 depending on vote distribution)
| KDTP | Mahir Yagcilar | 1.21 | 3 | 0 |
| Vakat | Džezair Murati | 0.72 | 3 | +1 |
| IRDK | Bislim Hoti | 0.39 | 2 | 0 |
| PDAK | Sabit Rrahmani | 0.37 | 1 | New |
| SDA | Numan Balić | 0.37 | 1 | 0 |
| SLKM | Oliver Ivanović | 0.20 | 8 | New |
| GIG | Rustem Ibiši | 0.20 | 1 | 0 |
| PREBK | Zylfi Merxha | 0.15 | 1 | 0 |
| CIS | Slaviša Petković | 0.05 | 2 | New |
This lists parties that won seats. See the complete results below.
| Prime Minister before | Prime Minister after |
|---|---|
| Bajram Rexhepi; PDK | Ramush Haradinaj; AAK |

Parliamentary elections were held in the UN-administered Kosovo on 24 October 2004. They were the second elections for the Transitional Assembly following the establishment of the United Nations Interim Administration in 1999. The elections were supervised by the OSCE Mission in Kosovo.

The Democratic League of Kosovo (LDK) remained the largest party, winning 47 of the 120 seats in the Assembly. As no party had absolute majority, a coalition government was formed by the LDK and the Alliance for the Future of Kosovo (AAK), with the AAK's leader Ramush Haradinaj becoming prime minister.

== Results ==
| Party | Votes | % | Seats | +/– |
|---|---|---|---|---|
| Democratic League of Kosovo | 313,437 | 45.42 | 47 | 0 |
| Democratic Party of Kosovo | 199,112 | 28.85 | 30 | +4 |
| Alliance for the Future of Kosovo | 57,931 | 8.39 | 9 | +1 |
| Reformist Party ORA | 43,017 | 6.23 | 7 | New |
| Albanian Christian Democratic Party of Kosovo | 12,427 | 1.80 | 2 | +1 |
| Turkish Democratic Party of Kosovo | 8,353 | 1.21 | 3 | 0 |
| Justice Party | 7,013 | 1.02 | 1 | 0 |
| Vakat Coalition | 4,972 | 0.72 | 3 | +1 |
| People's Movement of Kosovo | 4,526 | 0.66 | 1 | 0 |
| Liberal Party of Kosovo | 3,542 | 0.51 | 1 | +1 |
| Democratic Alternative of Kosovo | 3,042 | 0.44 | 0 | New |
| Democratic Union | 2,696 | 0.39 | 0 | New |
| New Democratic Initiative of Kosovo | 2,658 | 0.39 | 2 | 0 |
| Albanian National Unity Party | 2,607 | 0.38 | 0 | New |
| Democratic Ashkali Party of Kosovo | 2,555 | 0.37 | 1 | New |
| Party of Democratic Action | 2,520 | 0.37 | 1 | 0 |
| Fuad Ramiqi | 2,265 | 0.33 | 0 | New |
| Albanian National Front Party | 2,156 | 0.31 | 0 | 0 |
| Social Democratic Party of Kosovo | 2,107 | 0.31 | 0 | 0 |
| New Party of Kosovo | 1,568 | 0.23 | 0 | 0 |
| Bosniak Party of Democratic Action of Kosovo | 1,452 | 0.21 | 0 | –1 |
| Serbian List for Kosovo and Metohija | 1,414 | 0.20 | 8 | New |
| Civic Initiative of Gora | 1,358 | 0.20 | 1 | 0 |
| Prizrensko – Dragaška Inicijativa | 1,342 | 0.19 | 0 | New |
| Xhevdet Rexhaj | 1,135 | 0.16 | 0 | 0 |
| United Roma Party of Kosovo | 1,049 | 0.15 | 1 | 0 |
| Albanian National Democratic Party | 856 | 0.12 | 0 | 0 |
| Civic Initiative Balli Kombëtar Demokrat | 807 | 0.12 | 0 | New |
| Belul Beqaj | 601 | 0.09 | 0 | New |
| Riza Lluka | 592 | 0.09 | 0 | New |
| Civic Initiative "Serbia" | 369 | 0.05 | 2 | New |
| Albanian Ashkali Democratic Party of Kosovo | 361 | 0.05 | 0 | –1 |
| Ramë Dreshaj | 249 | 0.04 | 0 | New |
| Total | 690,089 | 100.00 | 120 | 0 |
| Valid votes | 690,089 | 98.65 | | |
| Invalid/blank votes | 9,430 | 1.35 | | |
| Total votes | 699,519 | 100.00 | | |
| Registered voters/turnout | 1,412,680 | 49.52 | | |
Source: KQZ, OCSE

== See also ==
- Constitutional Framework for Provisional Self-Government in Kosovo
- Provisional Institutions of Self-Government in Kosovo
