= Elections in Kosovo =

Parliamentary elections to the Assembly of Kosovo (Albanian: Kuvendi i Kosovës, Serbian Cyrillic: Скупштина Косова, transliterated Skupstina Kosova) have been held eight times since 2001, with the latest in February 2021. The Assembly was an institution within the Provisional Institutions of Self-Government (PISG) established by the United Nations Interim Administration Mission in Kosovo (UNMIK) to provide 'provisional, democratic self-government' in advance of a decision on the final status of Kosovo. Kosovo, formerly a province of Serbia, came under UN administration in 1999 and unilaterally declared its independence in February 2008. The Assembly elected in 2007 continued in office after the declaration of independence.

Under Kosovo's constitutional framework, which established the PISG, elections were to be held every three years for the Assembly. The Assembly then in turn elects a president and prime minister. The Assembly had 120 members elected for a three-year term: 100 members elected by proportional representation, and 20 members representing national minorities (10 Serbian, four Roma, Ashkali and Egyptian, three Bosniak, two Turkish and one Gorani). Under the new constitution of 2008, the guaranteed seats for Serbs and other minorities remains the same, but in addition they may gain extra seats according to their share of the vote. Kosovo has a multi-party system, with numerous parties and the system of proportional representation and guaranteed minority representation means that no one party is likely to have a parliamentary majority. In addition, a minimum number of ministers were and remain reserved for Serbs and other minorities. The voting age in Kosovo is 18.

== Parliamentary elections (latest) ==
=== 2025 ===
Preliminary results released by the Central Election Commission (CEC) indicated that Albin Kurti's Vetëvendosje party 51% of the ballots. While short of the 61 votes needed for a government, Vetëvendosje may potentially gather support from non-Serb minority representatives to reach a majority. The Democratic Party of Kosovo came second with 20%, maintaining a similar level of support from the last election. The Democratic League of Kosovo came in third with 13%, dropping in support from 18% earlier this year. Turnout was estimated at 45%. With the fourth successive victory for Vetëvendosje in parliamentary elections, Kurti is expected to be sworn in for a third term in office.

Party	Votes	%	Seats	+/–
Vetëvendosje	486,994	51.11	57	+9
Democratic Party of Kosovo	192,407	20.19	22	–2
Democratic League of Kosovo	126,102	13.23	15	–5
Alliance for the Future of Kosovo	52,370	5.50	6	+1
Serb List	42,734	4.48	9	0
Social Democratic Initiative	15,184	1.59	0	–3
Turkish Democratic Party of Kosovo	5,408	0.57	2	0
For Freedom, Justice and Survival	4,845	0.51	1	0
Vakat Coalition	3,957	0.42	1	0
New Democratic Party	3,919	0.41	1	0
New Democratic Initiative of Kosovo	2,760	0.29	1	0
Social Democratic Union	2,614	0.27	1	0
Egyptian Liberal Party	2,249	0.24	1	0
Ashkali Social Democratic Party	2,050	0.22	1	New
PAI–PDAK–LpB	1,994	0.21	0	–1
Unique Gorani Party	1,547	0.16	1	0
Progressive Movement of Kosovar Roma	1,158	0.12	1	New
Albanian Democratic National Front Party	937	0.10	0	0
United Roma Party of Kosovo	920	0.10	0	–1
Fjala	900	0.09	0	0
Citizens' Initiative for Kosovo	777	0.08	0	New
Kosovski Savez	536	0.06	0	New
Kosovar New Romani Party	228	0.02	0	0
Independent	269	0.03	0	0
Total	952,859	100.00	120	0
Registered voters/turnout	1,999,204	–		
Source: KQZ

=== By municipality or voting provision ===
Municipality	LVV		PDK		LDK		AAK		SL		Others	
Municipality	Votes	%	Votes	%	Votes	%	Votes	%	Votes	%	Votes	%
Deçan	5,746	32.48	733	4.14	2,825	15.97	8,180	46.23	1	0.01	208	1.17
Gjakova	24,636	54.64	4,204	9.32	4,454	9.88	10,085	22.37	2	0.00	1,712	3.79
Drenas	5,947	22.91	18,057	69.57	662	2.55	352	1.36	0	0.00	938	3.61
Gjilan	32,719	63.55	7,562	14.69	8,200	15.93	1,044	2.03	1,104	2.14	858	1.66
Dragash	5,256	39.17	2,321	17.30	2,550	19.00	98	0.73	64	0.48	3,120	23.32
Istog	9,846	46.45	2,138	10.09	5,889	27.78	2,022	9.54	212	1.00	1,088	5.14
Kaçanik	10,344	60.84	5,099	29.99	1,066	6.27	298	1.75	0	0.00	196	1.16
Klina	6,546	36.23	4,858	26.89	2,259	12.50	3,794	21.00	141	0.78	468	2.59
Kosovo Polje	12,726	54.16	4,661	19.84	3,299	14.04	520	2.21	299	1.27	1,991	8.48
Kamenica	8,948	61.31	2,182	14.95	1,531	10.49	695	4.76	816	5.59	422	2.89
Mitrovica	22,434	65.08	9,352	27.13	1,593	4.62	279	0.81	8	0.02	1,306	2.34
Leposavić	161	2.39	37	0.55	13	0.19	9	0.13	5,774	85.77	240	3.57
Lipjan	15,101	48.79	7,921	25.59	6,131	19.81	425	1.37	307	0.99	1,063	3.44
Novo Brdo	1,219	23.03	337	6.37	296	5.59	93	1.76	3,181	60.09	168	3.17
Obiliq	7,121	57.18	1,661	13.34	1,818	14.60	155	1.24	1,251	10.05	447	3.59
Rahovec	13,460	53.55	4,879	19.41	2,993	11.91	2,952	11.74	292	1.16	561	2.23
Peja	21,327	48.27	4,543	10.28	9,575	21.67	5,988	13.55	392	0.89	2,355	5.33
Podujeva	26,023	61.22	6,015	14.15	9,003	21.18	775	1.82	4	0.01	688	1.62
Pristina	60,696	52.94	21,984	19.17	25,196	21.98	4,193	3.66	238	0.21	2,347	2.04
Prizren	36,414	51.07	15,546	21.80	6,224	8.73	2,087	2.93	39	0.05	10,998	15.42
Skenderaj	3,523	16.38	16,683	77.57	546	2.54	207	0.96	107	0.50	984	2.04
Shtime	7,894	55.12	4,317	30.14	1,527	10.66	115	0.80	0	0.00	423	3.27
Štrpce	982	15.63	481	7.66	162	2.58	21	0.33	4,232	67.36	405	6.45
Suva Reka	15,723	49.08	6,006	18.75	6,488	20.25	2,702	8.44	0	0.00	1,114	3.48
Ferizaj	34,927	60.19	14,106	24.31	5,425	9.35	1,334	2.30	6	0.00	2,233	3.85
Viti	13,489	61.77	3,608	16.52	283	1.30	50	0.23	283	1.30	285	1.30
Vushtrri	21,633	61.26	8,698	24.63	2,848	8.07	401	1.14	850	2.41	881	2.49
Zubin Potok	248	6.93	135	3.77	71	1.98	18	0.50	2,953	82.51	154	4.31
Zvečan	153	4.12	65	1.75	17	0.46	4	0.11	3,327	89.60	147	3.96
Malisheva	9,862	37.38	4,787	18.15	2,581	9.78	716	2.71	1	0.00	8,434	31.97
Junik	779	36.08	147	6.81	514	23.81	692	32.05	0	0.00	27	1.25
Mamusha	561	19.49	174	6.05	17	0.59	136	4.73	0	0.00	1,990	69.14
Hani i Elezit	2,442	62.38	1,077	27.51	231	5.90	103	2.63	0	0.00	62	1.58
Gračanica	1,151	11.05	772	7.41	387	3.71	179	1.72	6,564	63.01	183	1.76
Ranilug	32	1.25	9	0.35	8	0.31	1	0.04	2,176	84.80	40	1.56
Parteš	11	0.57	1	0.05	5	0.26	0	0.00	1,707	89.05	193	10.08
Klokot	585	28.45	169	8.22	147	7.15	33	1.61	914	44.46	208	10.03
North Mitrovica	1,059	14.97	250	3.53	51	0.72	40	0.57	5,222	73.82	452	6.39
Embassy & Consulate Votes	13,899	86.74	973	6.07	762	4.76	255	1.59	0	0	134	0.83
Postal voting	30,611	72.62	3,854	9.14	4,331	10.27	1,657	3.93	4	0.01	1,696	4.01
Conditional voting	5,035	50.98	1,951	19.75	1,066	10.79	581	5.88	533	5.40	710	7.18
Persons with Special Needs Votes	622	36.96	440	26.14	207	12.30	120	7.13	181	10.75	113	6.73
Total	484,049	51.01	192,002	20.24	125,882	13.26	52,226	5.50	42,733	4.50	52,027	5.49

== Community Assembly of Kosovo ==
According to UNMIK practice, Serbian national referendums and elections for Parliament and President were allowed in Kosovo, but local elections were organized separately by UNMIK and the PISG. In spite of this, Serbia carried out local elections in Kosovo in 2008; these were not recognized by UNMIK.

The Community Assembly of Kosovo and Metohija is a local government created by the Serbian minority in the Kosovo city of Mitrovica in response to the 2008 Kosovo declaration of independence. The first elections for the Assembly took place on May 11, 2008 to coincide with the 2008 Serbian local elections.

In the Brussels agreement, the government of Serbia agreed to integrate Kosovo Serb political structures into the government of Kosovo.

== See also ==
- Electoral calendar
- Electoral system
- List of political parties in Kosovo
