= Fadil Gashi =

Kosov politician (born 1968)

Fadil Gashi (born 10 June 1968) is a politician and former Kosovo Liberation Army (KLA) commander in Kosovo. He was a member of the Assembly of Kosovo from 2004 to 2007 and has served several terms in the local assembly of Klina. Gashi is a member of the Democratic League of Kosovo (LDK).

== Early life and career ==
Gashi was born to a Kosovo Albanian family in the village of Qupevë in Klina, in what was then the Autonomous Province of Kosovo and Metohija in the Socialist Republic of Serbia, Socialist Federal Republic of Yugoslavia. He trained as a police officer and served in the police force from 1988 to 1990, when he was removed from the position amid growing inter-communal tensions in the province. From 1991 to 1997, he worked in education.

== KLA commander ==
From 1997 to 1999, Gashi was the commander of the Kosovo Liberation Army unit in the village of Sferkë in Klina. In the aftermath of the Kosovo War (1998–99), he was responsible for ensuring his unit's compliance in turning in weaponry to the international peacekeeping body Kosovo Force (KFOR). Media reports from the period describe him as having a good working relationship with KFOR and as co-operating with its requirements.

== Politician ==
=== Early years in municipal politics (2000–07) ===
Gashi joined the LDK in 1990, shortly after its formation.

He appeared in the fourteenth position on the party's electoral list for Klina in the 2000 Kosovan local elections. Local assembly elections in Kosovo are held under open list proportional representation; Gashi finished third among his party's candidates and was elected when the LDK won a majority victory in Klina with seventeen out of thirty-one seats. He was promoted to the fourth position on the party's list in the 2002 local elections, was re-elected when the list won thirteen seats, and served as deputy head of the municipality's executive in the term that followed.

=== Parliamentarian (2004–07) ===
Gashi appeared in the forty-fourth position on the LDK's list in the 2004 Kosovan parliamentary election, which was held under closed list proportional representation, and was elected when the list won a plurality victory with forty-seven seats. The LDK formed a coalition government with the Alliance for the Future of Kosovo (AAK) after the election, and Gashi served as a government supporter. He was a member of the security commission and the committee for economy, trade, industry, energy, transport, and communications.

All parliamentary elections in Kosovo since 2007 have been held under open list proportional representation. Gashi was given the sixty-seventh position on the LDK's list for the 2007 parliamentary election, finished in seventy-second place, and was not re-elected when the party fell to twenty-five seats.

=== Since 2007 ===
Gashi was promoted to the lead position on the LDK's list for Klina in the 2007 Kosovan local elections and was re-elected to the local assembly even as the party fell to seven seats. He has subsequently led the party's list and been re-elected to the assembly in the 2009, 2013, 2017, and 2021 local elections. The LDK has consistently won either five or six seats in the assembly during this time and has often played a "kingmaker" role in local politics. Gashi served as president of the local assembly from 2010 to 2013 and from 2015 to 2017, and in December 2021 he was chosen for his third term in this office.

Kosovo introduced the direct election of mayors in 2007. Gashi was the LDK's candidate for mayor of Klina in the 2009 and 2013 local elections and finished third on both occasions. In late 2021, he announced that the LDK would support the candidate of the Democratic Party of Kosovo (PDK) in the mayoral runoff vote.

Gashi was appointed as deputy minister for the Kosovo Security Force in July 2015. He stood down from the role in 2017, when the LDK left the Republic of Kosovo's coalition government.

He was given the forty-ninth position on the LDK's list in the 2021 Kosovan parliamentary election, finished sixty-fifth among the list's candidates, and was not elected when the list won fifteen seats.

Gashi's name was mentioned during a KLA trial at the Kosovo Specialist Chambers in The Hague in late 2023. One witness, a former KLA member, testified that a rival branch of the KLA had ordered him to kill Gashi after Gashi refused to accept Hashim Thaçi's authority. The witness added that he disobeyed the order and instead used a surrogate to warn Gashi of the threat to his life.

== Electoral record ==
=== Local (Klina) ===
2013 Kosovan local elections: Mayor of Klina
Candidate	Party	First round		Second round	
Candidate	Party	Votes	%	Votes	%
Sokol Bashota (incumbent)	Democratic Party of Kosovo	7,976	42.52	6,864	75.12
Enver Berisha	Alliance for the Future of Kosovo	4,575	24.39	2,273	24.88
Fadil Gashi	Democratic League of Kosovo	4,463	23.79		
Prend Buzhala	Albanian Christian Democratic Party of Kosovo	746	3.98		
Avni Gashi	New Kosovo Alliance	512	2.73		
Hajzer Idrizi	Levizja Vetëvendosje!	387	2.06		
Filip Berisha	Christian Democratic Party of Integration	100	0.53		
Total		18,759	100.00	9,137	100.00

2009 Kosovan local elections: Mayor of Klina
Candidate	Party	First round		Second round	
Candidate	Party	Votes	%	Votes	%
Sokol Bashota (incumbent)	Democratic Party of Kosovo	6,332	36.77	9,631	57.10
Enver Berisha	Alliance for the Future of Kosovo	5,490	31.88	7,235	42.90
Fadil Gashi	Democratic League of Kosovo	3,802	22.08		
Zenun Zeqa	Democratic League of Dardania	728	4.23		
Pjetër Coli	Albanian Christian Democratic Party of Kosovo	479	2.78		
Haki Morina	Socialist Party of Kosovo	160	0.93		
Ibish Rraci	Social Democratic Party of Kosovo	128	0.74		
Adem Gashi	Adem Haxhi Gashi	101	0.59		
Total		17,220	100.00	16,866	100.00
