= 2007 Kosovan parliamentary election =

- 17 November 2007
- All 120 seats in the Assembly; 61 seats needed for a majority
- Turnout: 40.10% (▼9.42pp)
| Party | Leader | Vote % | Seats | +/– |
|---|---|---|---|---|
| PDK | Hashim Thaçi | 34.32 | 37 | +7 |
| LDK | Fatmir Sejdiu | 22.63 | 25 | −22 |
| AKR | Behgjet Pacolli | 12.27 | 13 | New |
| LDD–PSHDK | Nexhat Daci | 9.97 | 11 | +9 |
| AAK | Ramush Haradinaj | 9.55 | 10 | +1 |
Minority seats (Note: Twenty seats were reserved for minorities but minority parties could win more than 20 depending on vote distribution)
| Vakat | Džezair Murati | 0.95 | 3 | 0 |
| KDTP | Mahir Yagcilar | 0.87 | 3 | 0 |
| SDA | Numan Balić | 0.64 | 2 | +1 |
| PDAK | Gezim Gashi | 0.60 | 3 | +2 |
| IRDK | Xhevdet Neziraj | 0.37 | 1 | −1 |
| GIG | Murselj Haljilji | 0.21 | 1 | 0 |
| SDSKM | Slaviša Petković | 0.16 | 3 | New |
| SLS | Slobodan Petrović | 0.15 | 3 | New |
| PREBK | Zylfi Merxha | 0.10 | 1 | 0 |
| SNSKM | Ljubiša Živić | 0.08 | 1 | New |
| SKMS | Dragiša Mirić | 0.06 | 1 | New |
| ND | Branislav Grbić | 0.04 | 1 | New |
| SNS | Mihailo Šćepanović | 0.04 | 1 | New |
This lists parties that won seats. See the complete results below.
| Prime Minister before | Prime Minister after |
|---|---|
| Agim Çeku; AAK | Hashim Thaçi; PDK |

2007 parliamentary elections in Kosovo were parliamentary elections, held in the UN-administered Kosovo on 17 November 2007, alongside the local municipal elections. Those were third elections for the Transitional Assembly of Kosovo since the establishment of the United Nations Interim Administration (UNMIK) in 1999. Elections were supervised by the OSCE Mission in Kosovo, and also monitored by the Council of Europe Mission in Kosovo. The elections were scheduled by the Special Representative of the Secretary-General of the United Nations, Joachim Rücker (head of the UNMIK) on 1 September 2007. Those were the first parliamentary elections in Kosovo to be held under open list proportional representation, while the previous 2001 and 2004 elections had been held under a closed list system.

== Results ==
On 17 November 2007, voters elected 120 members of the unicameral Assembly, the legislative branch of the Provisional Institutions of Self-Government, created by UNMIK. Electoral process was monitored and its outcome certified by UNMIK and OSCE.

| Party | Votes | % | Seats | +/– |
|---|---|---|---|---|
| Democratic Party of Kosovo | 196,207 | 34.32 | 37 | +7 |
| Democratic League of Kosovo | 129,410 | 22.63 | 25 | –22 |
| New Kosovo Alliance | 70,165 | 12.27 | 13 | New |
| LDD–PSHDK | 57,002 | 9.97 | 11 | +9 |
| Alliance for the Future of Kosovo | 54,611 | 9.55 | 10 | +1 |
| Reformist Party ORA | 23,722 | 4.15 | 0 | –7 |
| Justice Party | 9,890 | 1.73 | 0 | –1 |
| Vakat Coalition | 5,428 | 0.95 | 3 | 0 |
| Turkish Democratic Party of Kosovo | 4,999 | 0.87 | 3 | 0 |
| Party of Democratic Action | 3,661 | 0.64 | 2 | +1 |
| Democratic Ashkali Party of Kosovo | 3,443 | 0.60 | 3 | +2 |
| National Movement for the Liberation of Kosovo | 2,702 | 0.47 | 0 | New |
| New Democratic Initiative of Kosovo | 2,121 | 0.37 | 1 | –1 |
| Cemil Luma | 1,261 | 0.22 | 0 | New |
| Civic Initiative of Gora | 1,227 | 0.21 | 1 | 0 |
| Albanian National Front Party | 1,199 | 0.21 | 0 | 0 |
| Serbian Democratic Party of Kosovo and Metohija | 939 | 0.16 | 3 | New |
| Independent Liberal Party | 855 | 0.15 | 3 | New |
| United Roma Party of Kosovo | 600 | 0.10 | 1 | 0 |
| Naser Kuka | 822 | 0.14 | 0 | New |
| Union of Independent Social Democrats of Kosovo and Metohija | 447 | 0.08 | 1 | New |
| Serb Kosovo-Metohija Party | 317 | 0.06 | 1 | New |
| New Democracy | 256 | 0.04 | 1 | New |
| Serb People's Party | 224 | 0.04 | 1 | New |
| SSM for Kosovo and Metohija | 136 | 0.02 | 0 | New |
| Opstanak Kosovskog Pomoravlja | 123 | 0.02 | 0 | New |
| Total | 571,767 | 100.00 | 120 | 0 |
| Valid votes | 571,767 | 90.95 | | |
| Invalid votes | 34,883 | 5.55 | | |
| Blank votes | 21,980 | 3.50 | | |
| Total votes | 628,630 | 100.00 | | |
| Registered voters/turnout | 1,567,690 | 40.10 | | |
Source: KQZ

== Participation of Serbs ==
Major political parties of Serbs in Kosovo abstained from participation, that led to the very low turnout of voters from that community, since only minor Serbian parties and civic lists (eight in total) took part in the electoral process. The ten seats reserved for Serbs were thus divided between six electoral lists. Of those ten seats, six were won by four parties which on 5 December decided to form a post-electoral coalition: Slaviša Petković's Serb Democratic Party of Kosovo and Metohija, Dragiša Mirić's Serb Kosovo-Metohija Party, Mihajl Šćepanović's Serb People's Party and Nebojša Živić's Union of Independent Social Democrats of Kosovo and Metohija.
