= List of political parties in Kosovo =

This article lists political parties in Kosovo. Kosovo has a multi-party system with numerous political parties, in which no one party often has a chance of gaining power alone, and parties must work with each other to form coalition governments.

== Major parties ==
Parties having seats in Assembly of the Republic of Kosovo as a result of 2026 general election and subsequent shifts:

| Party | Abbr. | Founded | Ideology | Political position | Leader | MPs |
|---|---|---|---|---|---|---|
| Vetëvendosje; Lëvizja Vetëvendosje | LVV | 2005 | Democratic socialism; Neo-Marxism; Albanian nationalism; Pro-Europeanism | Centre-left to left-wing | Albin Kurti | 49 / 120 |
| Democratic Party of Kosovo; Partia Demokratike e Kosovës | PDK | 1999 | National conservatism; Economic liberalism; Social conservatism; Albanian nationalism | Centre-right to right-wing | Memli Krasniqi | 22 / 120 |
| Democratic League of Kosovo; Lidhja Demokratike e Kosovës | LDK | 1989 | Liberal conservatism; Social conservatism; Economic liberalism; Pro-Europeanism | Centre-right | Lumir Abdixhiku | 18 / 120 |
| Serb List; Српска листа / Srpska lista Lista serbe | LS | 2014 | Serb minority interests; National conservativism; Right-wing populism | Big tent | Zlatan Elek | 9 / 120 |
| Alliance for the Future of Kosovo; Aleanca për Ardhmërinë e Kosovës | AAK | 2001 | National conservatism; Economic liberalism; Albanian nationalism | Centre-right | Ramush Haradinaj | 7 / 120 |
| Guxo; Guxo | Guxo | 2020 | Liberal conservatism; Pro-Europeanism | Centre-right | Donika Gërvalla-Schwarz | 3 / 120 |
| Turkish Democratic Party of Kosovo; Kosova Demokratik Türk Partisi; Partia Demokratike Turke e Kosovës | KDTP | 1990 | Turkish nationalism; Turkish minority interests | Centre-right to right-wing | Fikrim Damka | 2 / 120 |
| Alternativa; Alternativa | A | 2017 | Liberalism | Centre | Mimoza Kusari-Lila | 1 / 120 |
| For Freedom, Justice and Survival; За слободу, правду и опстанак / Za slobodu, pravdu i opstanak Për liri, drejtësi dhe mbijetesë | SPO | 2021 | Serb minority interests | Centre | Nenad Rašić | 1 / 120 |
| Vakat Coalition; Koalicija Vakat; Koalicioni Vakat | Vakat | 2004 | Bosniak minority interests | Centre | Rasim Demiri | 1 / 120 |
| New Democratic Initiative of Kosovo; Iniciativa e Re Demokratike e Kosovës | IRDK | 2001 | Egyptian minority interests; Social democracy; Third Way | Centre to centre-left | Elbert Krasniqi | 1 / 120 |
| New Democratic Party; Nova Demokratska Stranka; Partia e Re Demokratike | NDS | 2009 | Bosniak minority interests | Centre | Emilija Redžepi | 1 / 120 |
| Social Democratic Union; Socijaldemokratska Unija; Unioni Social Demokrat | SDU | 2020 | Bosniak minority interests; Social democracy | Centre-left | Duda Balje | 1 / 120 |
| Ashkali Social Democratic Party; Partisë Socialdemokrate të Ashkalinjve | PSA | 2020 | Ashkali minority interests | Centre-left | Artan Asllani | 1 / 120 |
| Egyptian Liberal Party; Partia Liberale Egjiptiane | PLE | 2014 | Egyptian minority interests; Liberalism | Centre to centre-left | Veton Berisha | 1 / 120 |
| Unique Gorani Party; Јединствена Горанска Партија / Jedinstvena goranska partija Partia Unike Gorane | JGP | 2014 | Gorani minority interests | | Adem Hodža | 1 / 120 |
| United Roma Party of Kosovo; Partia Romani Yekhipeski pi Kosova; Partia Rome e Bashkuar e Kosovës | PREBK | 2005 | Romani minority interests | | Albert Kinoli | 1 / 120 |

== Minor parties ==
- Albanian Christian Democratic Party of Kosovo (Partia Shqiptare Demokristiane e Kosovës)
- Coalition Party (Kosovo)
- Democratic Alternative of Kosovo (Alternativa Demokratike e Kosovës)
- Justice Party (Partia e Drejtësisë)
- Liberal Party of Kosovo (Partia Liberale e Kosovës)
- New Kosovo Alliance (Aleanca Kosova e Re)
- Social Democratic Initiative (Nisma Socialdemokrate)
- Social Democratic Party of Kosovo
- The Word (Fjala)
- Albanian National Front Party (Partia Balli Kombetare Shqiptar)
- Albanian Democratic National Front Party (Partia Balli Kombetare Demokrat Shqiptare)

== Minority parties ==
- Ashkali Party for Integration (Partia e Ashkalinjëve për Integrim)
- Bosniak Party of Democratic Action of Kosovo (Bošnjačka Stranka Demokratske Akcije Kosova)
- Bosnian League of Kosovo
- Civic Initiative "Serbia, Democracy, Justice", founded in 2009 and led by Oliver Ivanović, that registered for 2013 elections under the changed name: Civic Initiative "Freedom, Democracy, Justice"
- Civic Initiative of Gora (Građanska Inicijativa Gore)
- Civic Initiative National Wing (Gradjanska Inicijativa Krilo Naroda)
- Independent Liberal Party (Samostalna Liberalna Stranka)
- Kosovo Turkish Union (Kosova Türk Birliǧi)
- League of Egyptians of Kosovo (Lidhja e Egjiptianëve të Kosovës)
- Montenegrin Democratic Party (Crnogorska Demokratska Stranka)
- Party of Democratic Action (Stranka Demokratske Akcije)
- Progressive Movement of Kosovar Roma (Kosovaki Romengi Anglipaski Phiravlin)
- Serb Democracy (Srpska demokratija)
- Serbian Democratic Party of Kosovo and Metohija (Srpska Demokratska Stranka Kosova i Metohije), initially founded in 2004 as the Civic Initiative "Serbia" (Građanska inicijativa "Srbija")
- Serb Kosovo-Metohija Party (Srpska Kosovsko-Metohijska Stranka)
- Serb People's Party (Srpska Narodna Stranka)
- Serbian List for Kosovo and Metohija (Srpska Lista za Kosovo i Metohiju)
- Serbian Social Democratic Party (Srpska Socijaldemokratska Stranka)
- Social Democratic Party of Gora (Socijaldemokratska Stranka Gore)
- Turkish Democratic Party of Kosovo (Kosova Demokratik Türk Partisi)
- Turkish Justice Party of Kosovo (Kosova Türk Adalet Partisi)
- Union of Independent Social Democrats of Kosovo and Metohija (Savez Nezavisnih Socijaldemokrata Kosova i Metohije)
- United Serbian List (Jedinstvena Srpska Lista) (all-Serb list, lists 56 candidates of both the ruling and the opposition parties based in Belgrade)

== Former parties ==
| Party | Abbr. | Ideology | Political position | Leader | Years active |
|---|---|---|---|---|---|
| People's Movement of Kosovo; Lëvizja Popullore e Kosovës | LPK | Before 1990: Self-determination; Albanian nationalism; Left-wing nationalism; Kosovar–Albanian unionism; Marxism–Leninism; Hoxhaism; After 1990: Self-determination; Social conservatism; Liberal conservatism | Before 1990: Left-wing to far-left; After 1990: Centre-right | Nuhi Berisha; Ali Ahmeti | 1982–2013 |
| National Movement for the Liberation of Kosovo; Lëvizja Kombëtare për Çlirimin e Kosovës | LKÇK | Marxism–Leninism; Hoxhaism | Far-left | Avni Klinaku; Bahri Fazliu; Salih Mustafa | 1993–2011 |
| League of Communists of Kosovo; Lidhja e Komunistëve të Kosovës | LKK | Communism; Marxism–Leninism; Titoism | Left-wing to far-left | Rrahman Morina | 1937–1990 |
| New Spirit Party; Partia Fryma e re | FeR | Liberalism | Centre | Shpend Ahmeti | 2010–2011 |
| Reformist Party ORA; Partia Reformiste ORA | ORA | Social democracy; Reformism | Centre to centre-left | Veton Surroi | 2004–2010 |
| Democratic League of Dardania; Lidhja Demokratike e Dardanisë | LDD | Conservatism; Social conservatism; Economic liberalism | Centre-right | Nexhat Daci | 2007–2015 |
| Strong Party; Partia e Fortë | PF | Atheism; Fantasy; Freedom of information; Pirate politics; Pro-Europeanism; Satire; Technological utopianism | Left-wing | Visar Arifaj | 2013–2019 |

- Green Party of Kosovo (Partia e të Gjelbërve të Kosovës)
- Socialist Party of Kosovo (Partia Socialiste e Kosovës)
- Movement for Integration and Unification (Lëvizja për Integrim dhe Bashkim)

== See also ==
- Lists of political parties
- List of political parties in Albania
- List of political parties in Serbia
