= 2010 Kosovan parliamentary election =

- 12 December 2010
- All 120 seats in the Assembly; 61 seats needed for a majority
- Turnout: 44.89% (▲4.79pp)
Party	Leader	Vote %	Seats	+/–
PDK	Hashim Thaçi	32.11	34	−3
LDK	Isa Mustafa	24.69	27	+2
LVV	Albin Kurti	12.69	14	New
AAK	Ramush Haradinaj	11.04	12	+2
AKR	Behgjet Pacolli	7.29	8	−5
Minority seats (Note: Twenty seats were reserved for minorities but minority parties could win more than 20 depending on vote distribution)
SLS	Slobodan Petrović	2.05	8	+5
KDTP	Mahir Yagcilar	1.22	3	0
JSL	Rada Trajković	0.86	4	New
Vakat	Rasim Demiri	0.76	2	−1
PDAK	Danush Ademi	0.41	1	−2
NDS	Emilija Redžepi	0.35	1	New
BSDAK	Abaz Ademi	0.26	1	New
IRDK	Bislim Hoti	0.24	1	0
PAI	Etem Arifi	0.20	1	New
SDSKM	Saša Ðokić	0.14	1	−2
GIG	Murselj Haljilji	0.11	1	0
PREBK	Albert Kinolli	0.10	1	0
This lists parties that won seats. See the complete results below.
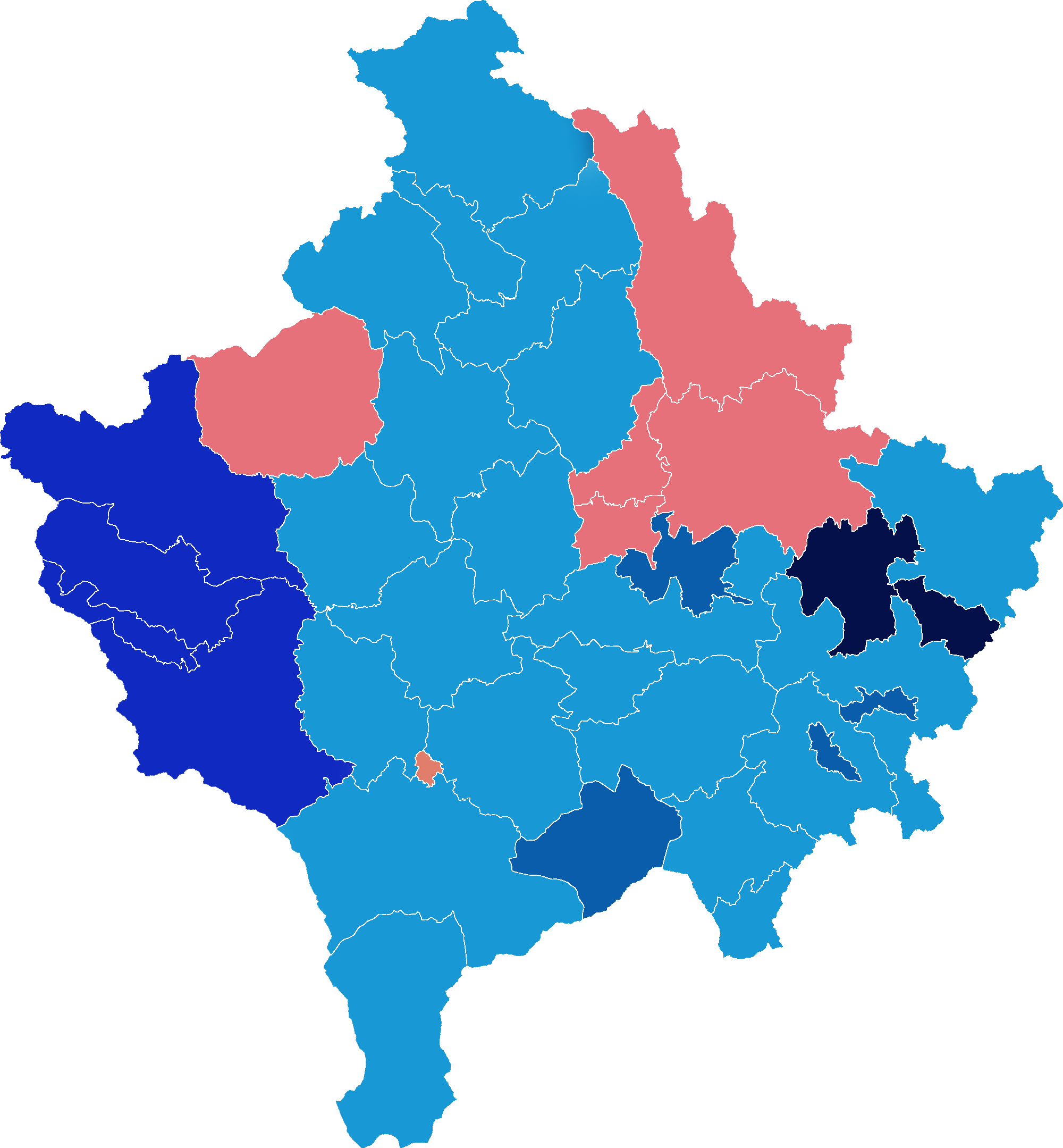
Results by municipality;
PDK LDK AAK SLS JSL KDTP
Prime Minister before	Prime Minister after
Hashim Thaçi; PDK	Hashim Thaçi; PDK

Parliamentary elections were held in Kosovo on 12 December 2010, following a vote of no-confidence in the government that brought forward the election. Those were the first elections after the country declared independence.

The Democratic Party of Kosovo (DPK) of incumbent Prime Minister Hashim Thaçi won a plurality amidst controversies and a partial re-poll, while he was still in the process of trying to form a government. The election was seriously hampered by a number of irregularities and election fraud; and a second poll was held on 9 January 2011 at 21 voting stations in 5 municipalities. The new vote was still positive for Thaçi in 4 out of 5 municipalities.

The election was marred by reports of drugs-, weapons- and human organs trafficking by an organisation linked to Thaçi, which led to the re-opening of a formal investigation by the EULEX mission.

== Background ==
The election was initially called on 15 October 2010, after President Fatmir Sejdiu resigned in September 2010 over accusations of breaching the constitution by continuing to hold his party leadership while president. However, the next day the Democratic League of Kosovo announced it would leave the ruling coalition on 18 October 2010, which would require early elections to be held within 45 days of that date. After the government failed a vote of no confidence on 2 November 2010, the election was set for 12 December 2010. The vote was a result of Hashim Thaçi's governing party supporting a no-confidence vote to trigger a snap election.

This was to be the first election since Kosovo's unilateral declaration of independence, and the International Court of Justice's advisory opinion on the legality of the declaration.

The call for a new election was condemned both within and outside of Kosovo because the incumbent government "orchestrated its own downfall," while election observers "warned the snap polls it triggered could damage Pristina at the international level." Koha Ditore said: "Nowhere in the world has a government overthrown itself asking for it to be changed. It could only happen in Kosovo." Express Daily also added that the election was a result of "the way Hashim Thaçi wanted it. The prime minister himself insisted on voting to overthrow the government." Other analysts also warned of ominous outcomes: Nexhmedin Spahiu said "Kosovo will pay the biggest price for it in the eyes of the international community. This will affect international recognitions because the crisis weakens the position of Kosovo." A journalist, Halil Matoshi, concurred with the reaction and added that "the quick and dizzying fall of all the pillars of the system [proved] the political establishment is unable to ensure stability. It sends a very bad message for Kosovo as a new democracy at the time when the country is facing the Atlantic integrations and implementation of European standards to achieve NATO and EU membership".

== Electoral system ==
In the Assembly (Kuvendi/Skupstina), 100 members are elected through an open-list proportional representation system to serve 4-year terms and 20 members are reserved to represent Kosovo's national minorities to serve 4-year terms.

In the proportional tier, there is a 30 per cent female quota under which every third candidate must be female. Electors may vote for up to five individual candidates within the list they choose. For the 20 reserved seats, 10 seats are reserved for Serbs, 4 seats for the Roma, Ashkali and Egyptians, 3 seats for the Bosniaks, 2 seats for the Turks, and one seat for the Gorani community.

Of the four seats reserved for the Roma, Ashkali, and Egyptian communities, one seat is specifically reserved for the Roma, one for the Ashkali, and one for the Egyptian community. The fourth seat is assigned to the community with the highest overall votes.

== Contesting parties ==
The Democratic League of Kosovo (LDK) split before the election. In late October 2010, former Health Minister Bujar Bukoshi and Ukë Rugova (the son of the late president Ibrahim Rugova) announced they would be filing a citizens' list called LDK – Ibrahim Rugova to run in the election. The Alliance for the Future of Kosovo of Ramush Haradinaj also signed an agreement with the LDK – Ibrahim Rugova faction list on 10 November 2010.

At a party congress on 7 November, Pristina mayor Isa Mustafa was elected as the new leader of LDK, beating incumbent Fatmir Sejdiu with 235 to 125 votes.

New Kosovo Coalition (AKR–PD–PSD–PPI–PPK–PNDSH–PGJK) – The New Kosovo Alliance of Behgjet Pacolli signed pre-election agreements with the Justice Party and the Social Democratic Party of Kosovo in early November. The coalition nominated Mimoza Kusari-Lila as its prime ministerial candidate.

The following parties were registered for the parliamentary elections:

Acronym	Name
LDK	Democratic League of Kosovo
FER	New Spirit Party
KTB	Turkish Union of Kosovo
PREBK	United Party of Kosovo Roma
PDAK	Democratic Party of Kosovo Ashkanlive
LEK	League of Kosovo Egyptians
SDSG	Social Democratic Party of Gora
IRDK	New Democratic Initiative of Kosova
PAI	Ashkali Party For Integration
PDK	Democratic Party of Kosovo
AKR–PD–PSD–PPI–PPK–PNDSH–PGJK	Coalition
LDD	Democratic League of Dardania
KDTP	Democratic Turk Party of Kosovo
VAKAT	Coalition Vakat
GIG	Citizen's Initiative of Gora
SNSD	Association of Independent Social Democrats
SKMS	Serbian Kosovo Metohia Party
SSDS	Serbian Social Democratic Party
SNS	Serbian National Party
GIKN	National Initiative Civil Wing
JSL	United Serbian List
AAK	Alliance for the Future of Kosovo
BSDAK	Bosniak Party of Democratic Action of Kosovo
VV	Lëvizja Vetëvendosje!
SLS	Independent Liberal Party
NDS	New Democratic Party, Kosovo
SDSKIM	Serbian Democratic Party of Kosovo and Metohia
SDA	Party of Democratic Action
CDS	Montenegrin Democratic Party

== Campaign ==
As campaigning began President Jakup Krasniqi called on "all political parties to run their campaigns in accordance with the law." He said that "For a moment the whole world will look at us, to see our democratic culture and political maturity and the seriousness of a declared state that has so far been recognised by 72 countries." Incumbent Thaçi was expected to benefit from an election where his viable contenders were in disarray.

Thaçi announced a pay increase of 30 per cent for 70,000 civil servants as well as a doubling of teachers' salaries during the electoral campaign. Jose Sulemane, the head of the IMF in Kosovo, said such a pay increase would not viable without breaking the terms of a deal Thaçi signed that would limit pay increases to a maximum rise of public sector pay to 8 per cent. The agreement offered Kosovo a 110 million euro soft loan as a preliminary loan to 300 million euros more from the European Union and the World Bank over three years. Thaçi dismissed the criticism as saying Kosovo was a "sovereign country [that] sets its own economic policy" and that he would continue with his pledges.

== Opinion polls ==
The DPK, led by incumbent Prime Minister Hashim Thaçi, was expected to narrowly win the election, though it would face difficulty in forming a stable government as its potential coalition partners, the Democratic League of Kosovo and the Alliance for the Future of Kosovo, ruled out working with his party. The nationalist Vetëvendosje movement and the Liberal Democratic Fryma a Re (FER) were also expected to enter parliament for the first time after crossing the minimum 5% threshold.

== Conduct ==
The Central Electoral Commission came under pressure to work quickly for the snap polls with a "short windor for preparations." Amid concerns of removing ineligible voters in such a short time, about 6,000 people were taken off the voting lists. The head of the commission Valdete Daka said on this would be Kosovo's most strictly watched elections with thousands of local and international observers in attendance. 1.6 million people were eligible to vote. About 5,000 civil society representatives and international missions were scheduled to monitor the election.

Following a 21 November municipal election that was found to have had mistakes, the CEC, and the largest monitoring mission, Democracy in Action, admitted having made the mistakes in vote counting in Orahovac with second place being given to the wrong party. This raised concerns for the parliamentary election.

Though Serbia told Kosovan Serbs conditions were not right for the election, turnout was expected to be high in the Serb enclaves of Gračanica and Štrpce. Vuk Drašković, a former foreign minister in Serbia and leader of the Serbian Renewal Movement, urged Kosovan Serbs to vote. The US ambassador also called on the Kosovan Serbs to vote, as well as the Helsinki Committee for Human Rights in Serbia who said voting in the polls would not deny them social welfare from Serbia. Several Serb organisation in both Serbia and Kosovo's Serbian areas said that continuing a boycott of elections was a denial of the ground reality. However, some Kosovan Serb officials warned that mobile polling stations would be provocative and could lead to untoward incidents. The head of the Zvečan municipality near Kosovska Mitrovica, Dragiša Milović, said polling booths in Serb areas, including the police station were "unacceptable."

Voting in the north would occur in temporary polling stations; while turnout was predicted to be low, Serbs in other areas of Kosovo were expected to have a big turnout.

Though the election passed off largely without incident, a Bosniak candidate who worked with the authorities in Pristina was shot dead in the northern city of Leposavić.

=== Fraud allegations and corruption ===
Although the first reports of the observers of the election were positive, allegations of fraud later arose as an unusually large voter turnout was reported by LDK in some strongholds of the rival PDK. LDK spokesman said that the voting had been compromised in two PDK strongholds where turnout was "statistically impossible, logically unreasonable, politically unacceptable and legally contestable in Kosovo's reality" with 94 per cent compared to the national average of 48%. He further stated that LDK will use all legal means to bring legitimacy to the election. In some voting stations the turnout was beyond 100%.

The Election Complaint and Appeals Panel received 171 complaints from political entities over various violations, such as stuffing ballot boxes, multiple voting and defective verification ultraviolet lamps.

Chief State Prosecutor Ismet Kabashi called upon prosecutors from seven municipalities to collect evidence of fraud. Municipal officials were after a trial sentenced to 6 months of prison.

Within days of the election, the Council of Europe released a report accusing Thaçi of leading a "mafia like" crime ring that smuggled weapons, drugs and human organs. It said Serbians and some Albanian Kosovars civilians detained by the Kosovo Liberation Army were shot in northern Albania and their kidneys were sold on the black market. The report said that after the Kosovo war and before international forces could establish law and order "organs were removed from some prisoners at a clinic in Albanian territory, near Fushe-Kruje..." In response, the Kosovo government denounced the report.

Organ theft allegations

On 12 December 2010, a draft report from Dick Marty to the Council of Europe was pre-released, alleging that the Republic of Kosovo's prime minister, Hashim Thaçi was the head of a "mafia-like" group responsible for smuggling weapons, drugs and human organs through eastern Europe. This article made waves across the world and led to a series of similar reports. The report came on the day of the second vote, and was accepted by the Parliamentary Assembly of the Council of Europe, which requested re-opening of a criminal investigation.

== Results ==
Incumbent PM Hashim Thaçi claimed victory in the election before the result was certified by the CEC with exit polls showing the Democratic Party of Kosovo won 31 per cent and the Democratic League of Kosovo followed with 25 per cent, though this was not yet certified by the CEC. Exit polls also indicated a 47% turnout.

The two leading parties, PDK and LDK, were in the previous governing coalition.

Party	Votes	%	Seats	+/–
Democratic Party of Kosovo	224,339	32.11	34	–3
Democratic League of Kosovo	172,552	24.69	27	+2
Vetëvendosje (Note: Ran with Movement for Unification)	88,652	12.69	14	New
Alliance for the Future of Kosovo	77,130	11.04	12	+2
New Kosovo Alliance	50,951	7.29	8	–5
New Spirit Party	15,156	2.17	0	New
Democratic League of Dardania	14,924	2.14	0	–11
Independent Liberal Party	14,352	2.05	8	+5
Turkish Democratic Party of Kosovo	8,548	1.22	3	0
United Serbian List	6,004	0.86	4	New
Vakat Coalition	5,296	0.76	2	–1
Democratic Ashkali Party of Kosovo	2,871	0.41	1	–2
New Democratic Party	2,478	0.35	1	New
Bosniak Party of Democratic Action of Kosovo	1,818	0.26	1	New
New Democratic Initiative of Kosovo	1,690	0.24	1	0
Party of Democratic Action	1,602	0.23	0	–2
Ashkali Party for Integration	1,386	0.20	1	New
Kosovo Turkish Union	1,364	0.20	0	New
League of Egyptians of Kosovo	1,010	0.14	0	New
Serb Democratic Party of Kosovo and Metohija	1,008	0.14	1	–2
Serbian Social Democratic Party	829	0.12	0	New
Civic Initiative of Gora	787	0.11	1	0
Montenegrin Democratic Party	771	0.11	0	New
Serb People's Party	749	0.11	0	–1
United Roma Party of Kosovo	690	0.10	1	0
Social Democratic Party of Gora	598	0.09	0	New
Serb Kosovo-Metohija Party	505	0.07	0	–1
Union of Independent Social Democrats of Kosovo and Metohija	486	0.07	0	–1
Civic Initiative National Wing	205	0.03	0	New
Total	698,751	100.00	120	0
Valid votes	698,751	95.36		
Invalid votes	29,226	3.99		
Blank votes	4,780	0.65		
Total votes	732,757	100.00		
Registered voters/turnout	1,632,276	44.89		
Source: KQZ, KQZ

=== Repeated vote ===
After reviewing the complaints, the Central Election Commission decided to have re-polling in 21 polling stations: 12 in Skenderaj, 5 in Drenas, 2 in Deçan and one each in Malishevë and Lipjan. The re-run took place on 9 January 2011.

=== Turnout of ethnic Serbs ===
Reports indicated that the Serb-majority area around Mitrovicë had just two votes cast from a population of 60,000 by the time polls closed, one of which was in the Bosniak area. In Graçanicë, the municipal election commission predicted a 40 turnout. Other election day controversies included a polling station in Banjska being surrounded by more than 50 Serbs and a road to the village being blocked with 2 men arrested and the polling station later moved. A KFOR office in Zubin Potok was also shot at in the morning. However, a high turnout was reported by Serbs in enclaves in central Kosovo, who make up about two-thirds of the 120,000 ethnic Serb population.

== Reactions ==
- EU representatives called for a speedy formation of a new government.
  - The head of European Parliament's observer team, Doris Pack said: "Serious allegations of fraud in two municipalities have been brought to the attention of the delegation." The EP delegation also added that "a generally well organised Election Day with a good voter turnout is encouraging for the continuous democratic development of Kosovo." They regarded the increased participation by Kosovo Serbs as a sign of further engagement with Kosovan institutions, but also expressed disappointment with the low voter turnout in northern Kosovo.
  - The European Network of Election Monitoring Organisations said that the elections were orderly but that there were "some cases of breaches of procedures and irregularities."
  - European Parliament reporter had stated that the elections were an organised manipulation
- US State Department spokesman Mark Toner said: "The United States urges the Kosovo elections commission to address the few serious irregularities that did occur." Ambassador Christopher Dell said he had personally witnessed ballot stuffing.
  - On 26. January 2011, after the election re-run in several districts, the US Ambassador to Kosovo Christopher Dell predicted that the new government will be formed before Kosovo Independence Day, 17 February, He also stated that "this is an important event for Kosovo. It is an important symbol to have a new, completely functional government on the third anniversary of the independence", adding that he'd like to see a government with a clear and coherent agenda.
- The Russian Foreign Ministry said the election was illegal.

== Analysis ==
Following the election, the Democratic Party of Kosovo needed at least two coalition partners to achieve a majority in parliament. As it previous allies ruled out working with the party and the Vetëvendosje! movement considered too nationalistic to form a government, the New Kosovo Alliance and the minority parties Independent Liberal Party and the United Serbian List were seen the most likely coalition partners. The United Serbian List, however, rejected rumours about their participation in a DPK-led government on 16 December.

== Government formation ==
The Democratic Party of Kosovo and the New Kosovo Alliance agreed on a coalition on 19 December. However, this report was denied by Agim Çeku of the Social Democratic Party of Kosovo the next day. However, the New Kosovo Alliance then said there would be no place in government for people under criminal investigation, in reference to the organ theft report. The SLS said on 28 December that it would join a government led by the DPK. There were also rumours following the election that Hashim Thaçi would become president, while Mimoza Kusari-Lila would become PM. Behgjet Pacolli, leader of the New Kosovo Alliance stated, on 30 December, that he would either demand the office of president in return for entering a coalition with the PDK or the ministries of Finance and Health.

A deal between PDK and AKR was tentatively reached on 9 February 2011. However, some PDK members were reportedly unhappy with Pacolli becoming president, but would rather see acting president Jakup Krasniqi take over in a permanent capacity. On 11 February, this was confirmed and Pacolli was offered the office of Assembly Speaker and Deputy Prime Minister, as well as four ministries for his AKR party, but not the office of President. Reportedly, the coalition will include only PDK, AKR and minority parties, as well as Ukë Rugova's Ibrahim Rugova List, totalling 65 MPs, a majority. According to Koha Ditore, the PDK accepted Pacolli's demands on 13 February.

The distribution of ministries reported in the media foresees three ministries for the AKR party, two or three ministries for the ethnic Serb parties and one ministry each for other minorities and Ukë Rugova, with the rest going to Thaçi's PDK. Hashim Thaçi would be nominated for PM, Jakup Krasniqi as Assembly Speaker and Pacolli as president.

The coalition agreements, according to the foreign media, foresee that: The PDK will get a deputy prime minister and ten ministries, AKR would get a deputy prime minister and three ministries, the Serb minority party SLS would get the post of another deputy prime minister and three ministries, the Ibrahim Rugova List would get another deputy prime minister and a ministry and the other non-Serbian minorities (working together as the parliamentary group "6 plus") would also get a ministry.

The coalition agreement was finally signed on 20 February 2011 and the distribution of ministries was:

- The AKR will have Muhamet Mustafa as deputy prime minister. Agim Çeku in the Security Force Ministry, Ferid Agani in the Health Ministry and Mimoza Kusari-Lila in the Trade and Industry Ministry.
- Independent Liberal Party (SLS) leader Slobodan Petrović will be deputy prime minister and the SLS will get the Local Self-Government Ministry, Communities and Return Ministry and Labor and Social Welfare Ministry.
- The minorities' parties (Turks, Ashkalis and Egyptians) will get the Environment and Spatial Planning Ministry.

The agreement with the Ibrahim Rugova List would be signed later.
