= 2014 Kosovan parliamentary election =

- 8 June 2014
- All 120 seats in the Assembly of Kosovo; 61 seats needed for a majority
- Turnout: 42.62% (▼2.27pp)
Party	Leader	Vote %	Seats	+/–
PDK	Hashim Thaçi	30.38	37	+3
LDK	Isa Mustafa	25.24	30	+3
LVV	Albin Kurti	13.59	16	+2
AAK	Ramush Haradinaj	9.54	11	−1
NISMA	Fatmir Limaj	5.15	6	New
Minority seats
Serb List	Aleksandar Jablanović	5.22	9	New
KDTP	Mahir Yagcilar	1.02	2	−1
Vakat	Džezair Murati	0.89	2	0
PDS	Nenad Rašić	0.82	1	New
PDAK	Danush Ademi	0.46	1	0
NDS	Emilija Redžepi	0.39	1	0
PLE	Isuf Berisha	0.27	1	New
PAI	Etem Arifi	0.22	1	0
KzG	Adem Hodža	0.16	1	New
KNRP	Jollxhi Shala	0.09	1	New
This lists parties that won seats. See the complete results below.
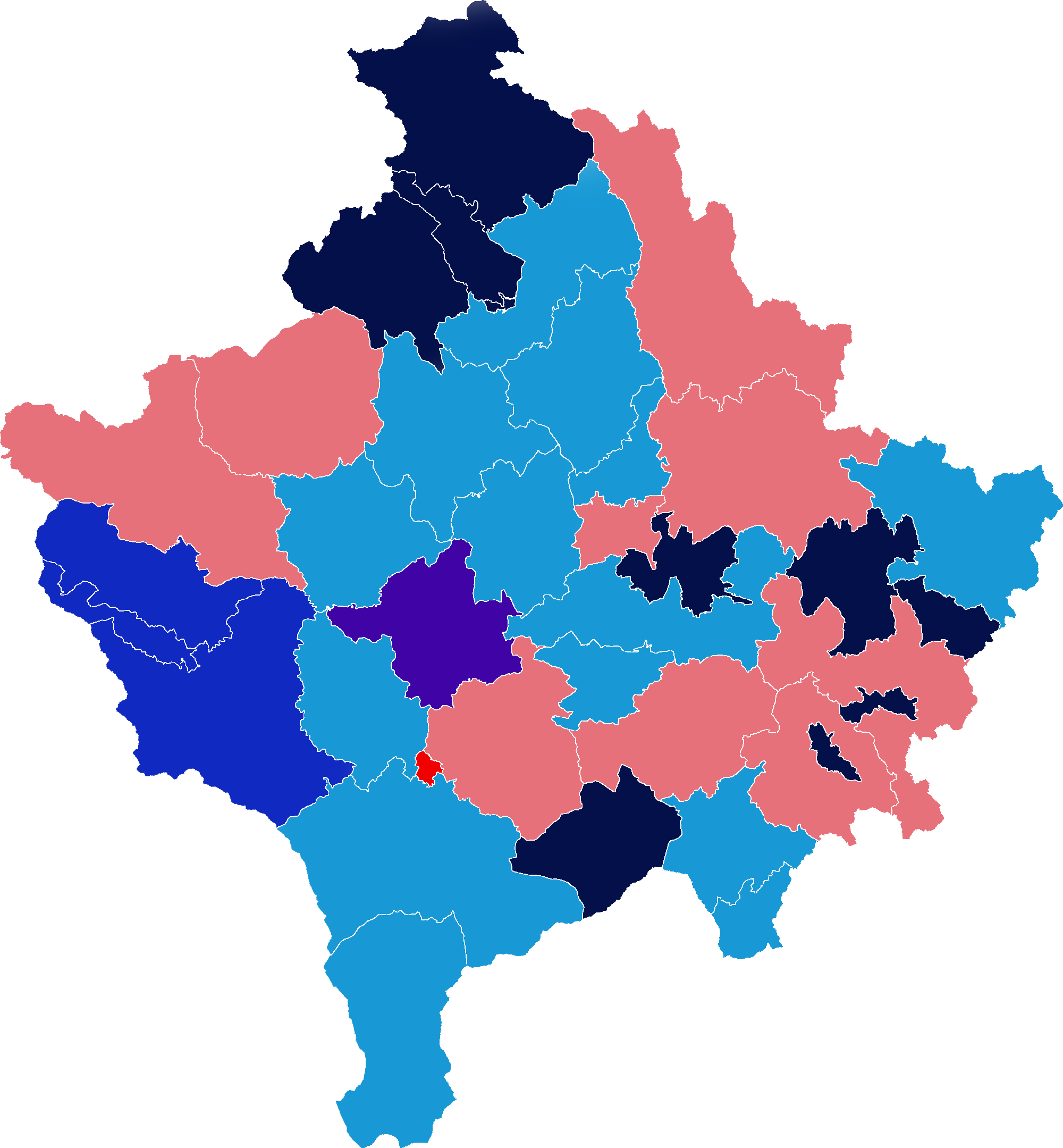
Most voted-for party by municipality;
PDK LDK AAK SL NISMA KDTP
Prime Minister before	Prime Minister after
Hashim Thaçi; PDK	Isa Mustafa; LDK

Parliamentary elections were held in Kosovo on 8 June 2014, after incumbent Prime Minister Hashim Thaçi announced his intention to hold elections.

On 7 May, the Assembly was dissolved and President Atifete Jahjaga confirmed the Election date as 8 June 2014.

== Results ==
Party	Votes	%	Seats	+/–
PDK–PD–LB–PSHDK–PK	222,181	30.38	37	+3
Democratic League of Kosovo	184,596	25.24	30	+3
Vetëvendosje	99,397	13.59	16	+2
Alliance for the Future of Kosovo	69,793	9.54	11	–1
Serb List	38,199	5.22	9	New
Civic Initiative for Kosovo	37,681	5.15	6	New
New Kosovo Alliance	34,170	4.67	0	–8
Turkish Democratic Party of Kosovo	7,424	1.02	2	–1
Vakat Coalition	6,476	0.89	2	0
Progressive Democratic Party	5,973	0.82	1	New
Democratic Ashkali Party of Kosovo	3,335	0.46	1	0
New Democratic Party	2,837	0.39	1	0
Turkish Justice Party of Kosovo	2,349	0.32	0	New
Egyptian Liberal Party	1,960	0.27	1	New
Movement for Democratic Prosperity	1,787	0.24	0	New
Ashkali Party for Integration	1,583	0.22	1	0
New Democratic Initiative of Kosovo	1,456	0.20	0	–1
Centre Democratic Union	1,298	0.18	0	New
Coalition for Gora	1,193	0.16	1	New
Partia e Fortë	1,142	0.16	0	New
Party of Democratic Action	1,096	0.15	0	0
Bosniak United List	860	0.12	0	New
Hasan Gashi (independent candidate)	775	0.11	0	New
Movement for Gora	754	0.10	0	New
Bosniak Party of Democratic Action of Kosovo	702	0.10	0	–1
Kosovar New Romani Party	645	0.09	1	+1
United Roma Party of Kosovo	642	0.09	0	–1
Independent Liberal Party	379	0.05	0	–8
Social Democracy	325	0.04	0	New
Movement Traditional Albanian Grouping	243	0.03	0	New
Total	731,251	100.00	120	0
Valid votes	731,251	95.36		
Invalid/blank votes	35,566	4.64		
Total votes	766,817	100.00		
Registered voters/turnout	1,799,023	42.62		
Source: Central Election Commission CEC

== Aftermath ==
Foreign media viewed the election results as "inconclusive". According to the Constitution, "If no one challenges the election results within 24 hours, parliament will have 30 days to convene. The prime minister-designate will then have 15 days to form a government that has the backing of a majority of deputies." Incumbent Prime Minister Hashim Thaci and the PDK were expected to be the first to form government, having won a plurality of the seats in the election. However, an opposition coalition of the LDK, AAK, and NISMA sought to form a governing coalition, arguing that together they could form a majority of the seats in parliament.

When parliament resumed in July, the opposition coalition attempted to elect LDK leader Isa Mustafa as Speaker of Parliament, but only after a member of Thaci's party had walked out of the vote.

This constitutional crisis dragged on for several months, until the PDK formed a governing coalition with the LDK. Under the agreement, LDK leader Isa Mustafa would become Prime Minister, while Thaci would be Deputy Prime Minister and Minister of Foreign Affairs.

Parliamentary struggles continued for Kosovo after the government was formed. Vetëvendosje, an opposition party staunchly opposed to the 2013 Brussels Agreement between Kosovo and Serbia, vowed that "no session will be held until the government renounces a deal with Serbia that gives greater rights to Serbs living in northern Kosovo." Opposition members of parliament set off nine smoke bombs in the parliamentary chambers over a period of six months.
