= 2019 Kosovan parliamentary election =

- 6 October 2019
- All 120 seats in the Assembly; 61 seats needed for a majority
- Turnout: 44.59% (▲3.43pp)
Party	Leader	Vote %	Seats	+/–
LVV (Note: Ran with Alternativa)	Albin Kurti	26.27	29	−3
LDK	Vjosa Osmani (Note: Although Isa Mustafa was leader of the LDK, Vjosa Osmani was its candidate for Prime Minister)	24.55	28	+4
PDK	Kadri Veseli	21.23	24	+1
AAK–PSD	Ramush Haradinaj	11.51	13	+3
NISMA–AKR–PD	Fatmir Limaj	5.00	6	−4
Minority seats
SL	Goran Rakić	6.40	10	+1
Vakat	Rasim Demiri	0.84	2	0
KDTP	Mahir Yagcilar	0.81	2	0
PLE	Veton Beriša	0.58	1	0
NDS	Emilija Redžepi	0.47	1	0
PAI	Etem Arifi	0.37	1	0
IRDK	Elbert Krasniqi	0.21	1	+1
JGP	Adem Hodža	0.14	1	0
PREBK	Albert Kinolli	0.13	1	0
This lists parties that won seats. See the complete results below.
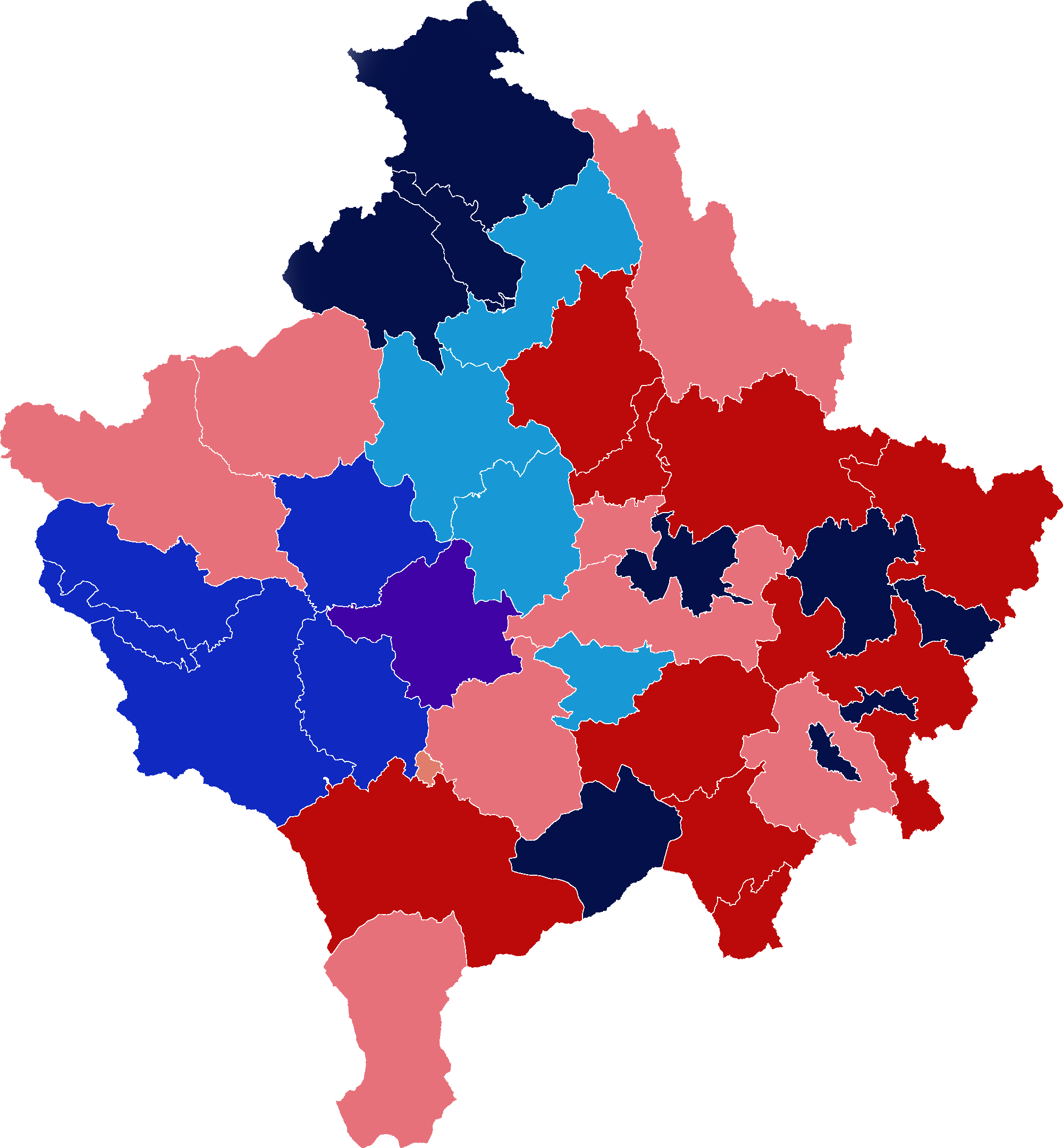
Most voted-for party by municipality
LVV LDK SL PDK AAK NISMA KDTP
Prime Minister before	Appointed Prime Minister
Ramush Haradinaj; AAK	Albin Kurti; LVV

Parliamentary elections were held in Kosovo on 6 October 2019. The main opposition parties received the most votes, led by Vetëvendosje and the Democratic League of Kosovo (LDK). Vetëvendosje leader Albin Kurti became Prime Minister, forming a governing coalition with the LDK on an anti-corruption platform. He is the second Prime Minister not to have been a fighter of the Kosovo Liberation Army during the 1990s.

== Background ==
On 19 July 2019 Prime Minister Ramush Haradinaj resigned after being summoned for questioning by the KSC in The Hague, Netherlands. The constitution requires the President to designate a new candidate to either form a government, or hold new elections in between 30 and 45 days after consultation with political parties or coalitions who hold a majority in the Assembly.

On 2 August 2019, President Hashim Thaçi asked the PANA Coalition to propose a new candidate to form a coalition government. However, other political parties opposed the move.

On 5 August 2019, the Assembly of Kosovo agreed to hold an extraordinary session on 22 August, planning to disband itself so that elections could be scheduled. Subsequently, on 22 August 2019, MPs voted to dissolve parliament, with 89 of the 120 voting in favour, necessitating elections within 30–45 days.

== Electoral system ==
The 120 members of the Assembly are elected by open list proportional representation, with 20 seats reserved for national minorities. An electoral threshold of 5% was in place for non-minority parties.

== Parties and coalitions ==
On 7 September the Election Commission published the official list of the 25 participating parties and coalitions.

Party	Candidate for Prime Minister	Votes received by the candidate for PM
Vetëvendosje (VV) Alternativa (Candidates run inside VV list)	Albin Kurti (VV)	183 952 (VV)
Democratic League of Kosovo (LDK) PSHDK (Candidates run inside LDK list)	Vjosa Osmani (LDK)	176 016 (LDK)
Democratic Party of Kosovo (PDK) Movement for Unification (Candidates run inside PDK list)	Kadri Veseli (PDK)	145 881 (PDK)
100% Kosovo (AAK - PSD Coalition): Alliance for the Future of Kosovo (AAK); Social Democratic Party of Kosovo (PSD)	Ramush Haradinaj (AAK)	76 163 (AAK)
NISMA - AKR - PD Coalition: NISMA; New Kosovo Alliance (AKR); Justice Party (PD)	Fatmir Limaj (NISMA)	25 918 (NISMA)
The Word (Fjala)	Gëzim Kelmendi	
Euroatlantic Party of Kosovo (PEK)	Milaim Zeka	
Independent (Esmir Rasi)	Esmir Rasi	
Serbian parties (10 seats reserved)
Serb List		
Independent Liberal Party (SLS)		
Serb Coalition (Sloboda): Progressive Democratic Party (PDS); European Movement of Serbs in Kosovo; New Kosovo Party		
Party of Kosovo Serbs (PKS)		
Other minority parties (10 seats reserved)
Romani, Ashkali and Egyptians	4 seats reserved	
United Roma Party of Kosovo (PREBK)		
Kosovar New Romani Party (KNRP)		
Ashkali Party for Integration (PAI)		
Democratic Ashkali Party of Kosovo (PDAK)		
Egyptian Liberal Party (PLE)		
New Democratic Initiative of Kosovo (IRDK)		
Bosniaks	3 seats reserved	
Vakat Coalition		
Bosniak Party of Democratic Action of Kosovo (SDA)		
New Democratic Party (NDS)		
Turks	2 seats reserved	
Turkish Democratic Party of Kosovo (KDTP)		
Gorans	1 seat reserved	
Civic Initiative of Gora (GIG)		
Unique Gorani Party (JGP)		
Movement for Gora (PG)		

== Opinion polls ==
Coalitions

Pollster	Date	PDK	AAK PSD	NISMA AKR PD	LDK	LV	Other	Lead	Abstention
PIPOS	Exit Poll- 6 Oct	25.8	12.3	5.8	27.9	28.1	–	0.2	-
Klan Kosova	Exit Poll- 6 Oct	22.28	10.58	4.41	30	30	–	Tie	-
SS	4 Oct	19	11	4	32	28	–	4	-

Parties

Pollster	Date	PDK	AAK	NISMA	LDK	AKR	A	LV	PSD	SL	Other	Lead	Abstention
NDI	25 Apr	16	17	–	25	–	–	20	–	–	–	5	-
IPSP	2 Apr	16.1	12.1	5.3	21.2	1.6	0.2	19.7	2.2	1.1	–	1.5	-
PIPOS	1–2 Feb	26	14	5	24	3	1	19	3	-	1	2	-
2019
UBO Consulting	11–18 Dec	20.5	12.6	6.3	27.1	-	-	22.6	-	-	10.9	4.5	-
IFIMES	19–28 Sep	22.9	10.1	5.2	28.3	1.6	0.6	23.1	2.2	-	6	5.2	-
KDI	25 Aug–5 Sep	18.4	8.8	4.9	23.8	1.7	0.6	17.6	2	4.1	2.6	5.4	15.6
KDI	10–5 Jun	23	10.4	6.3	30.8	-	-	21.2	2.4	2	4.1	7.8	-
2018
2017 election	11 Jun 2017	33.74			25.53			27.49		6.12	7.12	6.25	-

== Results ==
The initial results showed that the pro-government NISMA–AKR–PD alliance fell only a few hundred votes short of meeting the 5% electoral threshold and lost all 10 of their seats. However, the Kosovo Election Complaints and Appeals Panel subsequently ordered around 3,782 votes originating in Serbia to be removed from the vote count as they had been delivered by Serbian officials rather than by post. The removed votes allowed the NISMA-led alliance to cross the threshold and win six seats, a reduction of four from the prior election. Vetëvendosje and the Independent Liberal Party (which lost its parliamentary representation) were the only other parties to see a reduction in their seat totals. The Democratic League of Kosovo, Democratic Party of Kosovo, AAK–PSD alliance and the Serb List all gained seats. Voter turnout was around 45%.

Party	Votes	%	Seats	+/–
Vetëvendosje	221,001	26.27	29	–5
Democratic League of Kosovo	206,516	24.55	28	+5
Democratic Party of Kosovo	178,637	21.23	24	+1
100% Kosovo (AAK–PSD)	96,872	11.51	13	+3
Serb List	53,861	6.40	10	+1
NISMA–AKR–PD	42,083	5.00	6	–4
Vakat Coalition	7,075	0.84	2	0
Turkish Democratic Party of Kosovo	6,788	0.81	2	0
Egyptian Liberal Party	4,887	0.58	1	0
New Democratic Party	3,935	0.47	1	0
Ashkali Party for Integration	3,113	0.37	1	0
Fjala	2,852	0.34	0	0
Democratic Ashkali Party of Kosovo	1,963	0.23	0	–1
Independent Liberal Party	1,859	0.22	0	–1
New Democratic Initiative of Kosovo	1,755	0.21	1	+1
Euroatlantic Party of Kosovo	1,173	0.14	0	New
Unique Gorani Party	1,159	0.14	1	0
United Roma Party of Kosovo	1,078	0.13	1	0
Bosniak Party of Democratic Action of Kosovo	834	0.10	0	0
Party of Kosovo Serbs	816	0.10	0	0
Civic Initiative of Gora	785	0.09	0	0
Movement for Gora	695	0.08	0	0
Serb Coalition (Sloboda)	672	0.08	0	New
Kosovar New Romani Party	289	0.03	0	0
Independents	577	0.07	0	New
Total	841,275	100.00	120	0
Valid votes	841,275	96.20		
Invalid/blank votes	33,271	3.80		
Total votes	874,546	100.00		
Registered voters/turnout	1,961,213	44.59		
Source: KQZ, KQZ, KQZ

=== Results by municipalities ===
Results by Municipality
Municipality	LVV		LDK		PDK		100% Κosovo AAK – PSD		NISMA – AKR – PD		SL		Others	
Municipality	Votes	%	Votes	%	Votes	%	Votes	%	Votes	%	Votes	%	Votes	%
Deçan	1,143	6.90	3,818	23.07	872	5.27	10,288	62.16	280	1.69	11	0.07	139	0.84
Gjakova	13,354	31.12	7,661	17.85	3,976	9.26	14,683	34.22	1,315	3.06	10	0.02	1,914	4.46
Drenas	2,628	11.33	1,380	5.95	15,193	65.48	1,695	7.31	1,880	8.10	2	0.01	423	1.82
Gjilan	18,757	40.26	12,594	27.03	7,846	16.84	3,373	7.24	1,692	3.63	1,219	2.62	1,112	2.39
Dragash	1,440	11.03	3,800	29.10	3,480	26.65	408	3.12	483	3.70	323	2.47	3,122	23.91
Istog	2,751	13.90	8,744	44.19	2,631	13.29	3,644	18.41	377	1.90	389	1.97	853	4.31
Kaçanik	5,454	36.01	2,548	16.82	5,095	33.64	935	6.17	939	6.20	3	0.02	171	1.17
Klina	1,690	9.88	4,619	27.00	4,546	26.57	4,674	27.32	853	4.99	185	1.08	539	3.15
Kosovo Polje	5,445	29.65	5,518	30.05	3,469	18.89	1,100	5.99	707	3.85	414	2.25	1,710	9.31
Kamenica	5,203	31.83	3,396	20.78	2,294	14.03	2,430	14.87	1,433	8.77	1,396	8.54	193	1.18
Mitrovica	11,341	34.27	7,470	22.57	11,311	34.18	1,020	3.08	960	2.90	21	0.06	967	2.92
Leposavić	166	2.05	64	0.79	123	1.52	21	0.26	64	0.79	6,995	86.56	648	8.03
Lipjan	5,719	20.03	10,627	37.22	7,832	25.86	1,457	5.10	1,623	5.68	637	2.23	1,103	3.86
Novo Brdo	548	11.25	570	11.70	280	5.75	227	4.66	125	2.56	2,992	61.40	131	2.69
Obiliq	3,168	25.57	2,570	20.75	2,268	18.31	2,309	18.64	318	2.57	1,316	10.62	438	3.54
Rahovec	4,939	22.73	5,098	23.47	4,588	21.12	5,376	24.75	858	3.95	438	2.02	427	1.97
Peja	10,085	21.96	14,700	32.00	4,699	10.23	12,234	26.64	734	1.60	510	1.11	2,969	6.46
Podujevë	13,927	35.00	15,094	37.93	7,421	18.65	1,872	4.70	762	1.91	26	0.06	689	1.73
Pristina	40,432	37.68	34,158	31.83	16,654	15.52	8,285	7.72	5,213	4.86	409	0.38	2,158	2.01
Prizren	17,923	26.64	12,722	18.91	14,720	21.88	4,304	6.40	3,998	5.94	93	0.14	13,517	20.09
Skenderaj	1,598	7.79	999	4.87	15,587	75.99	482	2.35	1,323	6.45	144	0.70	380	1.85
Shtime	3,469	27.95	2,823	22.74	4,162	33.53	486	3.92	1,000	8.06	6	0.05	466	3.76
Štrpce	477	6.49	474	6.45	548	7.46	59	0.80	191	2.60	5,153	70.13	446	6.07
Suva Reka	4,807	17.70	9,739	35.85	4,770	17.56	5,535	20.38	1,853	6.82	20	0.07	440	1.62
Ferizaj	18,068	34.69	12,871	24.71	13,238	25.41	3,363	6.46	2,325	4.46	23	0.04	2,222	4.22
Viti	6,474	32.72	6,819	34.47	3,717	18.79	1,610	8.14	857	4.33	78	0.39	230	1.16
Vushtrri	11,160	33.75	7,687	23.25	9,364	28.32	1,513	4.58	1,414	4.28	1,136	3.44	790	2.39
Zubin Potok	145	3.07	137	2.90	138	2.92	38	0.80	14	0.30	4,184	88.55	69	1.46
Zvečan	70	1.53	106	2.32	74	1.62	9	0.20	4	0.09	4,202	91.91	107	2.34
Malisheva	2,908	13.56	4,191	19.54	5,020	23.40	1,504	7.01	7,613	35.49	8	0.04	206	0.96
Junik	193	8.94	705	32.65	134	6.21	1,058	49.00	50	2.32	1	0.05	18	0.83
Mamusha	80	4.06	42	2.13	345	17.52	24	1.22	122	6.20	3	0.15	1,356	68.87
Hani i Elezit	1,303	36.14	593	16.45	1,040	28.85	313	8.68	307	8.52	0	0.00	49	1.36
Gračanica	174	1.81	270	2.82	159	1.66	46	0.48	41	0.43	8,233	85.86	666	6.94
Ranilug	8	0.28	12	0.42	12	0.42	10	0.35	7	0.25	2,623	92.07	177	6.21
Parteš	5	0.23	2	0.09	0	0.00	0	0.00	0	0.00	2,007	93.13	141	6.54
Klokot	200	10.30	170	8.76	123	6.34	47	2.42	97	5.00	1,206	62.13	98	5.05
North Mitrovica	512	5.52	277	2.99	527	5.68	80	0.86	38	0.41	7,444	80.29	393	4.24
Embassy & Consulate Votes	3,237	51.85	1,448	21.48	831	13.02	360	5.07	213	2.71	1	0.01	454	5.86
Total	221,001	26.27	206,516	24.55	178,637	21.23	96,872	11.51	42,083	5.00	53,861	6.40	42,305	5.04
Source: KQZ

== Aftermath ==
After the election, Vetëvendosje leader Albin Kurti formed a coalition with the LDK. However, the government collapsed on 25 March following a motion of no confidence. Following the vote, the LDK formed a new government with the Alliance for the Future of Kosovo, the Social Democratic Initiative and the Serb List. However, due to the Constitutional Court's ruling and a deputy's conviction, the government collapsed again and another election was held on 14 February 2021.
