= 2021 Kosovan parliamentary election =

- 14 February 2021
- All 120 seats in the Assembly; 61 seats needed for a majority
- Turnout: 48.78% (▲4.19pp)
Party	Leader	Vote %	Seats	+/–
LVV (Note: Ran with GUXO and Alternativa)	Albin Kurti	50.28	58	+29
PDK	Enver Hoxhaj	17.01	19	−5
LDK (Note: Ran with AKR)	Avdullah Hoti (Note: Although Isa Mustafa was leader of the LDK, Avdullah Hoti was its candidate for Prime Minister)	12.73	15	−15
AAK	Ramush Haradinaj	7.12	8	−5
Minority seats
SL	Goran Rakić	5.09	10	0
KDTP	Fikrim Damka	0.75	2	0
Vakat	Bahrim Šabani	0.62	1	−1
IRDK	Elbert Krasniqi	0.38	1	0
RI	Gazmend Salijević	0.36	1	New
NDS	Emilija Redžepi	0.33	1	0
SDU	Duda Balje	0.29	1	New
JGP	Adem Hodža	0.25	1	0
PAI	Bekim Arifi	0.25	1	0
LPRK	Erdžan Galjuši	0.14	1	New
This lists parties that won seats. See the complete results below.
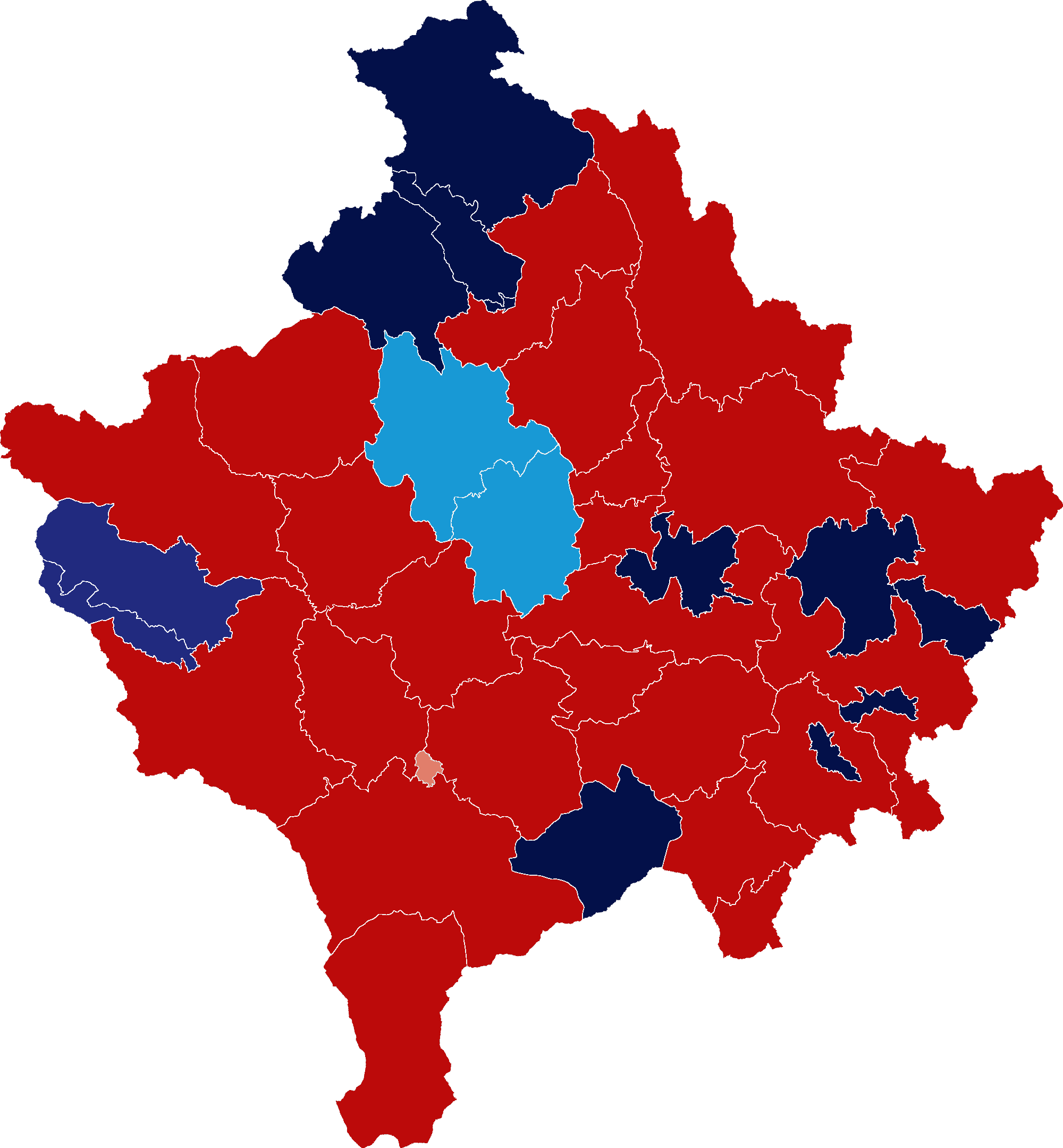
Most voted-for party by municipality
LVV SL PDK AAK KDTP
Prime Minister before	Prime Minister after
Avdullah Hoti; LDK	Albin Kurti; LVV

Parliamentary elections were held in Kosovo on 14 February 2021. The results were a landslide victory for Vetëvendosje led by Albin Kurti and its coalition partner, Vjosa Osmani, former speaker of the parliament of Kosovo. The alliance won more than 50% of the total votes, the highest share since the first elections held in 2001, while their nearest rivals, the Democratic Party, finished in second place, trailing by more than 33%.

== Background ==
The October 2019 parliamentary elections saw opposition party Vetëvendosje emerge as the largest faction in parliament, finishing just ahead of the Democratic League of Kosovo (LDK). The two parties formed a new government on 3 February 2020, with Vetëvendosje leader Albin Kurti as the Prime Minister. Kurti was elected Prime Minister with 66 votes and ten abstentions. The 34 opposition MPs boycotted the vote and left the Assembly building. The coalition soon collapsed as the LDK filed a no-confidence motion on 25 March 2020 due to disagreements over how to handle the coronavirus pandemic. The motion passed, with 82 members of the Assembly voting in favor, the first time a Kosovan government had fallen in such a manner. The Kurti cabinet continued in office as a caretaker government, while the LDK leader Avdullah Hoti attempted to form a government. Although Hoti's eligibility to be Prime Minister had been questioned by Kurti and Vetëvendosje, who claimed that a government could not be formed without the party that won the most seats in the previous elections, on 28 May the Constitutional Court confirmed the LDK had the right to form a government without fresh elections. The Court ruled that after the party that won the elections failed again to form a new government, another party was able to, and Hoti could be approved as Prime Minister in a parliamentary vote.

On 3 June Hoti was elected Prime Minister by a vote of 61–24, with one abstention. However, on 21 December the Constitutional Court ruled that the vote of Etem Arifi of the minority Ashkali Party for Integration in favour of Hoti was invalid (as Arifi had been convicted of fraud) and consequently the government had not received the support of the majority of the Assembly. As a result, fresh elections were called, with the Hoti government continuing as a caretaker government.

== Electoral system ==
The 120 members of the Assembly of Kosovo are elected by open list proportional representation, with 20 seats reserved for national minorities. An electoral threshold of 5% is in place for non-minority parties. Seats are allocated using the Webster/Sainte-Laguë method. To form a government, a party or coalition must have a majority of 61 MPs out of 120 seats in the Assembly of Kosovo.

== Parties and coalitions ==
The Election Commission published the official list of the 28 participating parties and coalitions.

Party or coalition	Candidate for Prime Minister
Social Democratic Initiative (NISMA)	Fatmir Limaj
Vetëvendosje (VV); Guxo and The Alternative (Candidates run inside VV list)	Albin Kurti
Democratic League of Kosovo (LDK); New Kosovo Alliance (Candidates run inside LDK list)	Avdullah Hoti
Democratic Party of Kosovo (PDK)	Enver Hoxhaj
Alliance for the Future of Kosovo (AAK)	Ramush Haradinaj
Fjala	Gëzim Kelmendi
Ballist Party (PB)	
Serbian parties (10 seats reserved)
Civic Initiatives for Freedom, Justice and Survival (GI SPO)	
Serbian Democratic Alliance (SDS)	
Serb List	
Other minority parties (10 seats reserved)
Romani, Ashkali and Egyptians	4 seats reserved
New Democratic Initiative of Kosovo (IRDK)	
Movement for Integration (LpB)	
United Roma Party of Kosovo (PREBK)	
Progressive Movement of Kosovar Roma (LPRK)	
Romani Initiative (RI)	
Kosovar New Romani Party (KNRP)	
Democratic Ashkali Party of Kosovo (PDAK)	
Ashkali Party for Integration (PAI)	
Egyptian Liberal Party (PLE)	
Bosniaks	3 seats reserved
Vakat Coalition	
Social Democratic Union (SDU)	
United Community (UZ)	
New Democratic Party (NDS)	
Our Initiative (NAŠA)	
Turks	2 seats reserved
Turkish Democratic Party of Kosovo (KDTP)	
Innovative Turkish Movement Party (YTHP)	
Gorans	1 seat reserved
Coalition Together: Civic Initiative of Gora (GIG); Movement for Gora (PG)	
Unique Gorani Party (JGP)	

== Opinion polls ==
Pollster	Date	LVV	LDK	PDK	AAK	SL	NISMA	Other	Abstention	Lead
UBO Consulting	14 February 2021 (Note: Exit poll)	47.9	14.6	17.7	6.6	(Note: Survey processed Albanian settlements only.)	2.7	–		30.2
Albanian Post	14 February 2021	53	17	20	7		2	–		33
KOHA	14 February 2021	50.7	15.1	15.4	6.8	5.8	2.9	3.3		35.3
PIPOS	14 February 2021	41.8	15.2	16.5	7.2		2.6	–		25.3
PIPOS	12 February 2021	40.95	19.35	22.3	7.8		3.15	1.4	5.0	18.65
Albanian Post	2 February 2021	51.3	15.5	13.2	5.5		1.8	–	–	35.8
KOZMO	26–30 January 2021	53.6	16.0	17.4	7.2		3.6	–	3.2	37.6
PIPOS	29 January 2021	43.8	17.2	21.1	7.0		2.9	1.0	7.2	22.7
PIPOS	22 January 2021	44.2	17.4	20.4	7.2		3.1	0.6	7.2	23.8
T7 & GE	22 January 2021	50.8	16.0	16.9	7.0		3.0	–	–	33.9
Riinvest Analytics	11–17 January 2021	54.1	10.3	14.9	6.4	5.0	1.4	4.4	3.5	39.2
PIPOS	15 January 2021	41.6	16.3	20.1	7.5		1.5	4.7	5.2	21.5
PIPOS	7 January 2021	41.4	15.7	20.8	8.6		2.0	5.3	6.5	20.6
UBO Consulting	23 December 2020	46.2	14.9	16.0	7.0	2.5	3.5	1.0	1.9	30.2
2019 election	6 October 2019	26.2	24.5	21.2	11.5	6.4	5.0	5.0	–	1.7

== Results ==
Vetëvendosje won the most votes that any party has won in any Kosovan election since independence. The previous vote share record was held by Ibrahim Rugova's victory in 2001 with 359,851 votes. The 2021 election saw a record number of non-resident citizens who participated in the election via postal voting. In comparison to 35,087 in the 2019 election, 102,100 non-resident citizens gained the right to vote via postal voting in the 2021 election. The counting of the locally cast ballots was completed within a week, while the diaspora vote count was finished on by 3 March.

In the initial results, two newly created minorities parties that had been backed by the Serb List (Romani Initiative and United Community) won two seats and one seat, respectively. However, the parties faced accusations of strategic voting organised by the Serb List in order gain control of seats outside the ten reserved for Serbs. More than 200 complaints to the Election Panel triggered an investigation that discovered many irregularities, including a suspicious 49% increase in the Bosnian minority vote compared to the 2019 elections, with a large share of those votes having been cast in Serb-dominated areas rather than in their own communities. This led the panel to remove hundreds of votes cast, which caused the loss of one of the two seats won by the Romani Initiative and the single seat won by United Community, a decision confirmed by the Supreme Court. The final result was certified by the Central Election Commission (KQZ) on 13 March.

Party	Votes	%	Seats	+/–
Vetëvendosje	438,335	50.28	58	+29
Democratic Party of Kosovo	148,285	17.01	19	–5
Democratic League of Kosovo	110,985	12.73	15	–15
Alliance for the Future of Kosovo	62,111	7.12	8	–5
Serb List	44,407	5.09	10	0
Social Democratic Initiative	21,997	2.52	0	–4
Turkish Democratic Party of Kosovo	6,496	0.75	2	0
Vakat Coalition	5,366	0.62	1	–1
New Democratic Initiative of Kosovo	3,305	0.38	1	0
Romani Initiative	3,172	0.36	1	New
New Democratic Party	2,885	0.33	1	0
Social Democratic Union	2,549	0.29	1	New
Egyptian Liberal Party	2,430	0.28	0	–1
United Community	2,217	0.25	0	New
Unique Gorani Party	2,161	0.25	1	0
Ashkali Party for Integration	2,138	0.25	1	0
Democratic Ashkali Party of Kosovo	1,960	0.22	0	0
Civic Initiative for Freedom, Justice and Survival	1,508	0.17	0	New
Our Initiative	1,375	0.16	0	New
Movement for Integration	1,261	0.14	0	New
Innovative Turkish Movement Party	1,243	0.14	0	New
Progressive Movement of Kosovar Roma	1,208	0.14	1	New
Fjala	1,087	0.12	0	0
United Roma Party of Kosovo	1,074	0.12	0	–1
Coalition Together (GIG–PG)	1,010	0.12	0	0
Kosovar New Romani Party	600	0.07	0	0
Serbian Democratic Alliance	476	0.05	0	New
Albanian National Front Party	155	0.02	0	New
Total	871,796	100.00	120	0
Valid votes	871,796	96.38		
Invalid/blank votes	32,756	3.62		
Total votes	904,552	100.00		
Registered voters/turnout	1,851,927	48.84		
Source: CEC, CEC, CEC

=== Results by municipalities ===
Results by Municipality
Municipality	LVV		PDK		LDK		AAK		SL		Others	
Municipality	Votes	%	Votes	%	Votes	%	Votes	%	Votes	%	Votes	%
Deçan	4,798	29.65	765	4.72	2,354	14.55	7,956	49.17	1	0.01	304	1.90
Gjakova	24,087	55.26	3,127	7.17	3,688	8.46	10,295	23.62	2	0.01	2,392	5.49
Drenas	5,884	25.43	14,568	62.96	703	3.04	734	3.17	3	0.01	1,248	5.39
Gjilan	32,742	65.21	5,868	11.69	7,611	15.16	1,417	2.82	596	1.19	1,973	3.93
Dragash	3,470	27.80	2,802	22.45	2,357	18.88	267	2.14	21	0.17	3,564	28.56
Istog	8,894	45.54	1,881	9.63	4,893	25.06	2,226	11.40	259	1.33	1,375	7.04
Kaçanik	9,854	59.54	4,647	28.08	1,087	6.57	423	2.56	1	0.01	538	3.24
Klina	5,566	32.46	3,754	21.90	2,901	16.92	3,809	22.22	213	1.24	902	5.26
Kosovo Polje	11,371	56.59	2,668	13.38	3,179	15.82	463	2.30	237	1.18	2,155	10.73
Kamenica	9,828	58.07	2,272	13.42	2,210	13.06	1,125	6.65	718	4.24	771	4.56
Mitrovica	22,580	64.27	8,500	24.19	2,152	6.12	533	1.52	9	0.03	1,361	3.87
Leposavić	129	1.43	65	0.72	7	0.08	7	0.08	8,129	89.96	699	7.73
Lipjan	14,638	48.95	6,088	20.36	6,059	20.26	685	2.30	268	0.90	2,163	7.23
Novo Brdo	1,040	25.27	282	6.85	462	11.23	104	2.53	2,104	51.13	123	2.99
Obiliq	6,692	53.45	1,290	10.30	1,184	9.46	1,814	14.49	938	7.49	601	4.81
Rahovec	11,743	49.34	3,613	15.18	3,087	12.97	4,398	18.48	303	1.27	656	2.76
Peja	23,822	50.52	4,303	9.12	8,643	18.33	6,807	14.43	438	0.93	3,143	6.67
Podujevë	25,899	60.95	4,717	11.10	9,819	23.11	892	2.10	1	0.01	1,164	2.74
Pristina	71,873	65.13	12,964	11.75	17,961	16.28	3,870	3.50	276	0.25	3,406	3.09
Prizren	33,268	47.52	11,428	16.32	6,672	9.53	2,182	3.12	25	0.04	16,459	23.47
Skenderaj	4,132	20.03	14,634	70.94	576	2.79	353	1.71	142	0.69	791	3.84
Shtime	6,932	51.20	4,051	29.92	1,373	10.14	276	2.04	0	0.00	906	6.70
Štrpce	906	15.05	450	7.16	265	4.21	37	0.59	4,031	64.12	558	8.87
Suva Reka	11,843	41.14	4,787	16.63	5,249	18.23	5,366	18.64	1	0.01	1,539	5.35
Ferizaj	35,158	61.95	11,872	20.92	5,103	8.99	1,714	3.02	4	0.01	2,892	5.11
Viti	12,939	59.75	3,099	14.31	4,305	19.88	690	3.19	60	0.28	561	2.59
Vushtrri	21,637	61.50	6,868	19.44	3,463	9.84	907	2.58	985	2.80	1,352	3.84
Zubin Potok	243	5.11	98	2.06	98	2.06	12	0.26	4,288	90.25	12	0.26
Zvečan	116	2.20	51	0.97	38	0.72	6	0.11	4,705	89.14	362	6.86
Malisheva	7,618	33.48	4,549	19.99	2,254	9.91	1,306	5.74	0	0.00	7,026	30.88
Junik	684	32.05	151	7.08	316	14.81	922	43.20	0	0.00	61	2.86
Mamusha	215	10.14	103	4.86	16	0.75	56	2.64	0	0.00	1,731	81.60
Hani i Elezit	2,118	54.20	986	25.23	247	6.32	282	7.22	0	0.00	275	7.03
Gračanica	451	5.96	184	2.43	152	2.01	29	0.38	4,347	57.48	2,375	31.74
Ranilug	19	0.96	4	0.20	18	0.91	2	0.10	1,827	92.79	97	5.04
Parteš	5	0.28	0	0.00	1	0.05	0	0.00	1,706	94.15	100	5.52
Klokot	391	28.40	80	5.81	98	7.11	25	1.82	685	49.75	98	7.11
North Mitrovica	908	8.89	337	3.29	92	0.90	54	0.53	7,084	69.27	1,818	17.12
Embassy & Consulate Votes	3,802	80.48	389	8.23	292	6.18	67	1.42	0	0.00	174	3.69
Total	438,335	50.28	148,285	17.01	110,985	12.73	62,111	7.12	44,407	5.09	67,725	7.77
Source: CEC

== Reactions ==
Albin Kurti, leader of the winning party, Vetëvendosje, called the results a vindication of his campaign claim that the election was a "referendum" on what he called a "seizure of the state" during the no-confidence vote held in 2020. All parties which are likely to stand in the opposition were part of the LDK-led governing coalition. They all accepted the results and congratulated Vetëvendosje.

Albanian prime minister Edi Rama and main opposition leader Lulzim Basha both congratulated Kurti. Ali Ahmeti, leader of DUI, the main ethnic Albanian party in North Macedonia, congratulated Vetëvendosje and pledged that his party would be a "brother, ally and supporter... as well as partner and cooperator". Shaip Kamberi, an ethnic Albanian MP in the parliament of Serbia, hailed the electoral process and the election results, which according to Kamberi showed "both democratic capacities and functional institutions".

In light of the disappointing results for LDK, party leader Isa Mustafa announced that he would resign.

On 4 April Vjosa Osmani was elected as the second female president of Kosovo by the Assembly.
