= Coalition Party =

The Coalition Party is a name used by more than one political party, including:

- Estonia: Estonian Coalition Party (Eesti Koonderakond), defunct
- Finland: National Coalition Party (Kansallinen Kokoomus or Samlingspartiet)
- Sweden: Moderate Coalition Party (Moderata samlingspartiet)
- Norway: Coalition Party (Norway) (Samlingspartiet)
- Kosovo: Coalition Party (Kosovo)

== See also ==
- Party coalition, a political coalition
