= Fadil Gashi (Kosovo politician, born 1987) =

Fadil Gashi (born 8 March 1987) is a politician in Kosovo from the Roma community. He has served in the Assembly of the Republic of Kosovo since 2021 as a member of the Romani Initiative (RI).

== Early life and career ==
Gashi was born in Obiliq, in what was then the Socialist Autonomous Province of Kosovo in the Socialist Republic of Serbia, Socialist Federal Republic of Yugoslavia. He has a primary school education.

== Politician ==
Gashi appeared in the lead position on the Romani Initiative's electoral list in the 2021 Kosovan parliamentary election and was elected when the list won one of the ten seats reserved for members of Kosovo's non-Serb minority communities. He is a member of the committee on rights and interests of communities and returns.

Several parliamentarians, including Gashi, absented themselves from the assembly during the first two failed attempts to confirm Vjosa Osmani as the Republic of Kosovo's president in April 2021. He and another minority list delegate appeared for the third vote, which provided sufficient quorum for Osmani to be elected.

Veton Berisha of Kosovo's Egyptian Liberal Party, who lost his seat in the 2021 election, has accused Gashi of being an illegitimate parliamentarian, saying that the Romani Initiative's vote result was orchestrated in conjunction with the Serb List. Berisha has brought his case to the Constitutional Court of Kosovo, which has not as yet rendered a decision. In July 2022, Berisha said that Gashi's voting record up to that point had been consistent with that of the Serb List. Gazmen Salijević, the leader of the Romani Initiative, had previously rejected any suggestion of collusion between his party and the Serb List.
