= Albanian Union of Christian Democrats =

Political party in Kosovo

The Albanian Union of Christian Democrats (Unioni Shqiptare DemoKristiane) (UShDK) is a political party in Kosovo. At the last legislative elections, 24 October 2004, the party was part of the Alliance for the Future of Kosovo.

President Lazer Krasniqi. Founded: 1990.

== History ==
Mr Lazer Krasniqi founded Kosovo's Christian Democrats in 1990. In 1994 he left the province to live in Croatia, to escape the authorities who had, in 1989, imprisoned him for crimes against the State. He was 'replaced as President by Mr Mark Krasniqi. In 1999, after the bombing, Lazer Krasniqi returned to Kosovo, and, finding that Mark Krasniqi was intending to remain President of the party, established a new party called, simply, 'the Union of Albanian Christian Democrats' which is now part of the Alliance for the Future of Kosovo. Mr Lazer Krasniqi claims that his party represents the continuation of the original party, and therefore cites 1990 as the year it was founded.

Zef Morina was also a Minister of Transport, Telecommunication and Post of Kosovo in this party.

== See also ==
- Albanian Christian Democratic Party of Kosovo
