= Coalition Party (Kosovo) =

The Kosovar Coalition party is a party that has 5 minor parties combined to make a larger party. The parties in the Coalition are:

- New Kosovo Party
- pro-European Party of Kosovo
- Democrats of Kosovo Party
- Albanian Alliance
- and Gorani Federals Party.

Leader: Driton Jygams
