= Bashota =

Bashota is a surname. Notable people with the surname include:

- Donika Bashota (born 1995), Swedish–Kosovar tennis player
- Sokol Bashota (born 1966), Kosovar politician
