= Jehona Lushaku Sadriu =

Kosovan politician and academic

- Lushaku Sadriu in 2025

Member of the Assembly of Kosovo

Personal details
- Born: 9 June 1980 (age 46) Pristina, Kosovo
- Party: Democratic League of Kosovo
- Education: University of Pristina (BA); Leibniz University Hannover (MA, PhD)
- Occupation: Politician, academic

Jehona Lushaku Sadriu (born 9 June 1980) is a Kosovan politician and academic. A member of the Democratic League of Kosovo (LDK), she sits in the Assembly of Kosovo and chairs the party's parliamentary group. She is an assistant professor of political science at the University of Pristina, where she teaches on the European Union, and was previously director of education of the Municipality of Pristina.

== Life and career ==
=== Early life and education ===
Lushaku Sadriu was born in Pristina in 1980. She studied German language and literature (1999–2004) and political science and public administration (2001–2004) at the University of Pristina. She completed a master's degree in European studies at Leibniz University Hannover, where she received a doctorate in 2019 with a dissertation on Europeanisation through conditionality and deliberation, later published as a book. She was a fellow of the Konrad Adenauer Foundation from 2005 to 2008.

=== Academic career ===
Lushaku Sadriu was a lecturer and teaching assistant in the political science department of the University of Pristina's Faculty of Philosophy from 2007 to 2019, and has been an assistant professor there since 2020. Her courses deal with EU institutions, decision-making, law and policies, and EU foreign policy. She has also been a guest lecturer at the University of Salzburg.

At the university she headed the international cooperation office, and she served as national coordinator of the Erasmus+ programme in Kosovo.

=== Advisory and civil society work ===
Alongside her academic work, Lushaku Sadriu worked as an expert and adviser on rule of law, anti-corruption and higher-education reform for projects of the United Nations Development Programme and the World Bank in Kosovo, and as an adviser on EU integration at the Ministry of Justice. She joined the board of the Kosovo Institute for Policy Research and Development (KIPRED) in 2019, and sat on the board of the Kosovo Democratic Institute from 2011 to 2018.

== Political career ==
=== Democratic League of Kosovo ===
Lushaku Sadriu joined the LDK on 22 December 2021, in an announcement by party leader Lumir Abdixhiku. She has also chaired the party's Women's Forum.

=== Municipality of Pristina ===
Lushaku Sadriu served as director of education of the Municipality of Pristina. Abdixhiku credited her with leading the education reforms during her time in the post, including the introduction of full-day schooling (mësimi tërëditor) with hot meals for pupils, which started in five schools with plans to extend it to 13 more the following year.

=== Assembly of Kosovo ===
Lushaku Sadriu is a member of the eleventh legislature of the Assembly of Kosovo and head of the LDK parliamentary group.

== Political positions ==
=== Education ===
Lushaku Sadriu has criticised the government's education policy. She faulted the Ministry of Education over the handling of the 2026 state Matura exam and called for the minister's resignation, and she criticised the government over Kosovo's results in the PISA 2025 test. She has also said that the government did not deliver promised nurseries and free school meals, and that the LDK guarantees nurseries and full-day schooling with hot meals.

== Selected works ==
- Lushaku, Jehona (2019). Europeanization through Conditionality and Deliberation: An Analysis of the Case Study of Kosovo. Europa als Politischer Raum. Vol. IV. LIT Verlag.
- Lushaku, Jehona (2019). "Europeanization through conditionality and deliberation". The Australian and New Zealand Journal of European Studies.
- Lushaku, Jehona (2019). "Management of the Conditionality". International Journal of Management Cases. 21 (3).
