= Kosovar New Romani Party =

Political party in Kosovo

The Kosovar New Romani Party (Albanian: Partia e Re Romake e Kosovës, Romani: Kosovaki Nevi Romani Partia, KNRP) is a political party in Kosovo representing the Romani community. It represents the interests of the Romani community in Kosovo.

== History ==
In the 2014 parliamentary elections the party received 0.09% of the vote, winning one seat reserved for minority groups. Its seat was held by Kujtim Paćaku, who joined the 6+ parliamentary group alongside other minority parties including the Turkish Democratic Party of Kosovo, the Vakat Coalition, the Democratic Ashkali Party of Kosovo. Its leader Joldži Šalja became Deputy Minister for Communities and Returns.
