= Romani Initiative =

Political party in Kosovo

The Romani Initiative (RI) is a political party in Kosovo representing the interests of the Roma community. The party won a single seat in the 2021 Kosovan parliamentary election. Its leader is Gazmen Salijević.

== Formation ==
The Romani Initiative was established in Gračanica prior to the 2021 parliamentary election. Its stated purpose is to "break the cycle of discrimination and poverty that has affected the Roma community for many years." It promotes "the inclusion of Roma in all aspects of social life in Kosovo, and especially for active participation in the political process."

== History ==
The Romani Initiative was initially reported as having won two of the ten seats reserved for non-Serb minority communities in the 2021 parliamentary election, emerging as the largest Roma party in Kosovo. Other Roma parties subsequently alleged that the RI's result was manipulated in conjunction with the Serb List, and in March 2021 the Elections Complaints Panel annulled more than eight hundred votes cast for the party, reducing its assembly representation to one seat. Salijević described this decision as unjust, saying that the RI had no agreement and no contact with the Serb List.

On 1 April 2021, Salijević was appointed as deputy minister for communities and return in the Republic of Kosovo government. He continues to hold this role as of January 2024.

The RI's delegate in the Republic of Kosovo assembly is Fadil Gashi. On 3 April 2021, several parliamentarians including Gashi absented themselves for the first two failed attempts to confirm Vjosa Osmani as the Republic of Kosovo's president. He and another minority list delegate appeared for the third vote, which provided sufficient quorum for Osmani to be elected.
