= New Spirit Party =

New Spirit Party Partia Fryma e re
- Leader: Shpend Ahmeti
- Founded: 5 November 2010
- Dissolved: 31 March 2011
- Merged into: Vetëvendosje!
- Headquarters: Pristina
- Ideology: Liberalism
- Political position: Centre

Partia Fryma e Re (FeR; English: New Spirit Party) was a political party in Kosovo. It was founded and registered with the Central Elections Committee in October 2010 by Harvard University graduate Shpend Ahmeti, Ilir Deda, Director of the Kosovo Institute for Policy Research and Development (KIPRED) and others, and supports Kosovo in becoming a new generation political state. "We do not distinguish citizens based on where they come from... they are individuals and everyone will be represented without distinction," stated Deda. FER participated in the 2010 general elections in Kosovo on 12 December.

Despite receiving significant attention on various social media platforms, the party performed poorly in the 2010 election, garnering only 2% of the vote and failing to reach the 5% threshold required for entry into parliament.

It merged into Vetëvendosje! on 31 March 2011.
