= Coalition for Gora =

Political party in Kosovo

The Coalition for Gora (Serbian: Koalicija za Goru, KzG) was a Gorani political coalition in Kosovo. It was formed in 2014 by the United Gorani Party (UGP) and the Civic Initiative of Gora (CIG). Electoral list of the coalition was headed by Adem Hodža (UGP).

== History ==
In the 2014 parliamentary elections the coalition received 1,193 votes (0.16%), winning a seat reserved for Gorani community, thus electing Adem Hodža to the Assembly of Kosovo.
