= Civic Initiative of Gora =

Gorani political party in Kosovo

Civic Initiative of Gora Грађанска иницијатива Горе Građanska inicijativa Gore
- Founder: Rustem Ibiši
- Founded: 2000
- Headquarters: Restelički put, Dragash
- Ideology: Gorani miniority politics
- Assembly of Kosovo: 0 / 120

Website
- gigdragas.org (inactive)

The Civic Initiative of Gora (CIG; Serbian Cyrillic: Грађанска иницијатива Горе, Serbian: Građanska inicijativa Gore, Albanian: Nisma Qytetare e Gorës) is a political party of Gorani, active since 2000 in the UN-administered Kosovo, and since 2008 in the Republic of Kosovo. It was established in 2000 as a civic initiative, and registered in 2002 as a political party, keeping the same name. Its headquarters are in Dragash, the municipal center of the historical region of Gora.

Its first leader was Rustem Ibiši, and then Murselj Haljilji, from 2008 to 2020.

CIG participated in all local elections since 2000, independently or within wider coalitions. The party held a seat in the Transitional Assembly of Kosovo, won in three consecutive electoral cycles (2001, 2004, 2007), and also a seat in the Assembly of the Republic of Kosovo, won in 2010 elections. It also held a seat in the Assembly of the Community of Municipalities of the Autonomous Province of Kosovo and Metohija, which was not recognized by the Republic of Kosovo.

The Civic Initiative of Gora should not be confused with similarly named organization, known as the Civic Initiative of Gorani, headquartered in Belgrade.

== Electoral results ==
=== Parliamentary elections ===
Transitional Assembly of Kosovo (2001-2008) Assembly of the Republic of Kosovo (since 2008)
Year	Popular vote	% of vote	Overall seats won	Gorani seats	+/–	Notes
2001	9,030	1.15%	1 / 120	1 / 1	▲1	within Coalition Vatan (4 seats: 1 for CIG); Rustem Ibiši, elected to the Assembly
2004	1,358	0.19%	1 / 120	1 / 1	Steady	Vezira Emruš, elected to the Assembly
2007	1,227	0.20%	1 / 120	1 / 1	Steady	Murselj Haljilji, elected to the Assembly
2010	787	0.11%	1 / 120	1 / 1	Steady	Murselj Haljilji, elected to the Assembly
2014	1,193	0.15%	0 / 120	0 / 1	▼1	Coalition for Gora (one seat taken, but for the coalition partner United Gorani Party)
2017	813	0.11%	0 / 120	0 / 1	Steady	
2019	820	0.10%	0 / 120	0 / 1	Steady	
2021	1,010	0.12	0 / 120	0 / 1	Steady	Coalition "Together" (Civic Initiative of Gora and Movement for Gora)

== See also ==
- Civic Initiative of Gora (official site, inactive, archived)
- Central Electoral Commission: Kosovo Assembly Elections
- Central Electoral Commission: Municipal Assembly Elections
