= Branislav Grbić =

Kosovar politician

Branislav Grbić is the Kosovo Minister for Return and Communities. A Serb, he is also the leader of New Democracy (Kosovo), a political party he formed on 11 July 2007. The party's priorities are minority and social rights, economic issues and democratic interests. Unlike other Kosovo Serb parties, its headquarters are not in the Serbian North Kosovo exclave, but rather in Kosovo's main city, Pristina.
