= Albanian Alliance =

Albanian Alliance is a political party in the Republic of Kosovo. They are in the Opposition Alliance Congress and support a minimal unification of Kosovo and Albania. Its leader is Lorik Sabriu.

== See also ==
- Politics of Kosovo
- Political parties in Kosovo
