= Serbian Democratic Party of Kosovo and Metohija =

Political party in Kosovo

The Serbian Democratic Party of Kosovo and Metohija (SDPKM, Serbian: Српска демократска странка Косова и Метохије/Srpska demokratska stranka Kosova i Metohije - СДСКМ/SDSKM), formerly known as the Civic Initiative "Serbia" (CIS, Serbian: Грађанска иницијатива "Србија"/Građanska inicijativa "Srbija" - ГИС/GIS) was a political party in the UN administered Kosovo. It was established in 2004, as the Civic Initiative "Serbia", and participated in the 2004 Kosovan parliamentary election, gaining two seats in the Transitional Assembly of Kosovo. Its leader Slaviša Petković served as member of the Transitional Government of Kosovo (2005-2006). In 2005, the organization changed its name to the Serbian Democratic Party of Kosovo and Metohija. Under the new name, it participated in the 2007 Kosovan parliamentary election, gaining three seats in the Transitional Assembly of Kosovo, and later also participated in the 2010 Kosovan parliamentary election, gaining only one seat in the Assembly of the Republic of Kosovo.

Due to its initial name (Civic Initiative "Serbia") that was used briefly (2004-2005), this organization should not be confused with other political organizations with similar names, such as the political association that was formed in 2013 under the initial name Civic Initiative "Serbia" (soon changed into: Civic Initiative Srpska), nor with the organization that was formed previously, in 2009 under the similar name: Civic Initiative "Serbia, Democracy, Justice", and was led by Oliver Ivanović.

== History ==
=== 2004 election ===
At the legislative elections held on 24 October 2004, the party participated under its initial name as the Civic Initiative "Serbia", and won 369 votes (0.05% of the popular vote) and won 2 out of 120 seats (Slaviša Petković and Saša Đokić).

=== 2007 election ===
At the legislative elections held on 17 November 2004, the party participated under the newly adopted name as the Serbian Democratic Party of Kosovo and Metohija, and won 939 votes (0.16% of the popular vote) and 3 out of 120 seats (Slaviša Petković, Vladimir Todorović, Radmila Vujović).

=== 2010 election ===
At the legislative elections held on 12 December 2010, the party participated as the Serbian Democratic Party of Kosovo and Metohija, and won 1,008 votes (0.14% of the popular vote) and won 1 out of 120 seats (Saša Đokić).
