= Bosnian League of Kosovo =

Bosnian League of Kosovo is a Bosniak Minority party in Kosovo. It is in the Coalition Government, and its leader is Ibrahim Ibrahimović.
