= Sferkë =

Sferkë: Sferkë (Albanian)
- Village
- Location in Kosovo
- Location: Kosovo
- District: Pejë
- Municipality: Klinë

Population (2024)
  - Total: 1,599
- Time zone: UTC+1 (CET)
  - Summer (DST): UTC+2 (CEST)

Sferkë Serbian: Сврхе/Svrhe), Albanian: Sferkë) is a village in the Klina municipality, Kosovo.
