= New Democracy (Kosovo) =

Serbian political party

New Democracy (Serbian: Нова демократија) is a Serbian political party in Kosovo. Founded on 11 July 2007 by Branislav Grbić, its priorities are minority and social rights, economic issues and democratic interests.
