= Ashkali Party for Integration =

Kosovar political party

Ashkali Party for Integration Partia e Ashkalinjve për Integrim
- Leader: Bekim Arifi
- Founded: 5 November 2010; 15 years ago
- Headquarters: Kosovo Polje, Kosovo
- Ideology: Ashkali minority interests
- Assembly: 1 / 120

Website
- https://pai-ks.org/

The Ashkali Party for Integration (Albanian: Partia e Ashkalinjve për Integrim, PAI) is an Ashkali political party in Kosovo registered on 5 November 2010. Their headquarters are located in Kosovo Polje.

== History ==
In the 2010 parliamentary elections the party received 0.2% of the vote and won one of the seats reserved for ethnic minorities. It retained its seat in the 2014, 2017, and 2021 elections. The party came to international attention in early 2021, when the Constitutional Court deemed the vote of PAI MP Etem Arifi during the confirmation of the cabinet invalid. Since this put the cabinet under the necessary majority threshold for confirmation, it led to a snap election.

== Election results ==
Assembly of Kosovo
Year	Popular vote	% of vote	Overall seats won	RAE seats	Seat change
2010	1,386	0.20	1 / 120	1 / 4	▲1
2014	1,583	0.22	1 / 120	1 / 4	Steady
2017	2,107	0.29	1 / 120	1 / 4	Steady
2019	3,113	0.37	1 / 120	1 / 4	Steady
2021	2,138	0.25	1 / 120	1 / 4	Steady
Feb 2025	1,804	0.22	1 / 120	1 / 4	Steady
Dec 2025	1,996 (Note: In a joint list with PDAK and LpB)	0.21	0 / 120	0 / 4	Steady
