= New Kosovo Party =

New Kosovo Party (Serbian: Нова косовска странка, Nova kosovska stranka) is a civic party in Kosovo. It was formerly part of the Coalition League and the Democratic Kosovo Union of Freedom and Right Politics.

The party is competing in the 2019 Kosovan parliamentary election in the Serb Coalition with the Progressive Democratic Party and the European Movement of Serbs in Kosovo.
