= United Roma Party of Kosovo =

United Roma Party of Kosovo Partia Rome e Bashkuar e Kosovës Partia Romani Yekhipeski pi Kosova
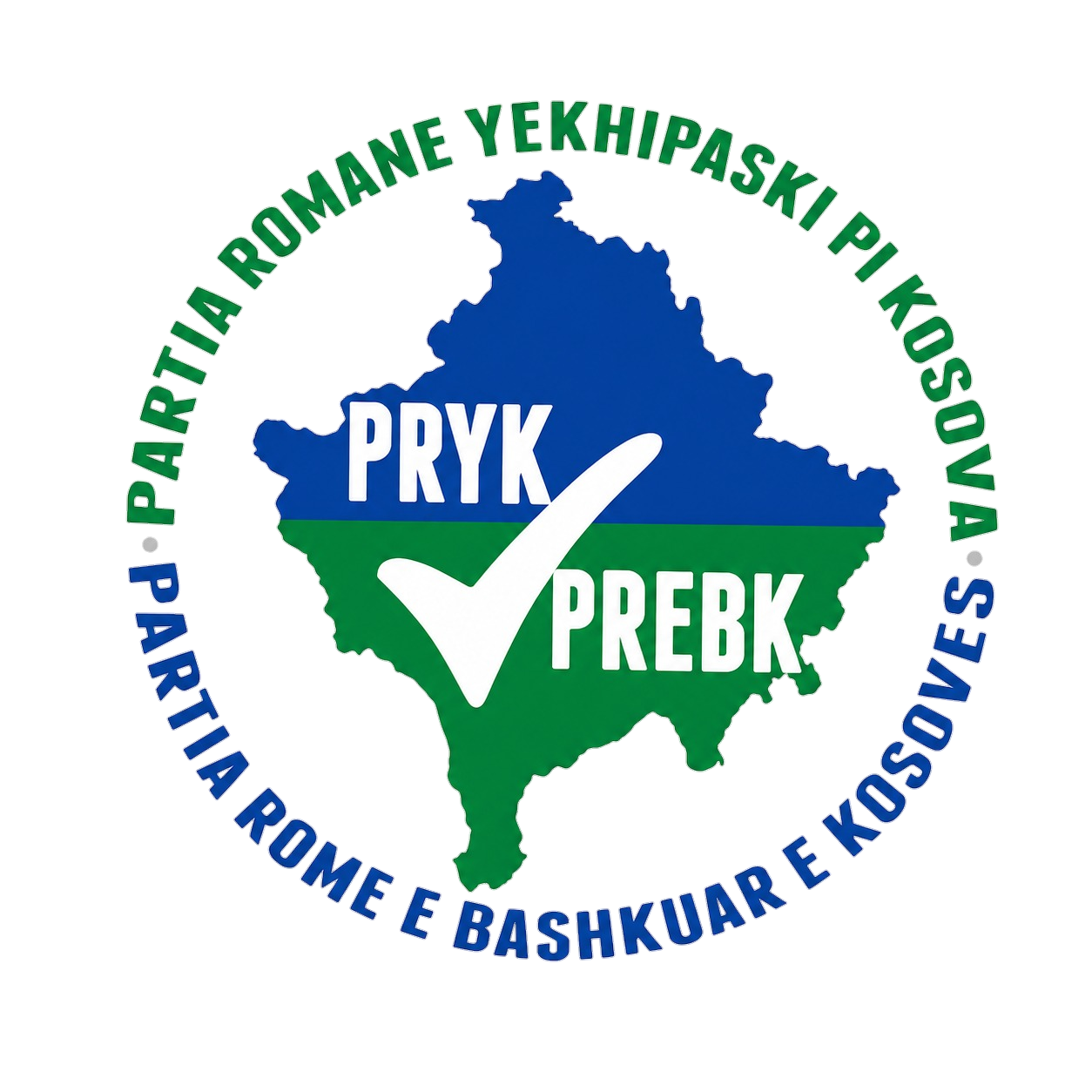
- Leader: Aljbert Kinoli
- Founded: 12 June 2005
- Ideology: Romani minority politics
- Assembly: 1 / 120
- Mayors: 0 / 38

Website
- www.prebk-ks.com

The United Roma Party of Kosovo (Albanian: Partia Rome e Bashkuar e Kosovës, PREBK, Romani: Partia Romani Yekhipeski pi Kosova, PRYK) is a political party in Kosovo founded in 2000. It represents the interests of the Romani community in Kosovo.

== Electoral history ==
At the 2004 parliamentary election, the party won 0.2% of the popular vote and 1 out of 120 seats in the Assembly of Kosovo, held by Zilfi Merdža.

In the 2017 elections Aljbert Kinoli won a seat in the assembly with the party gaining 955 votes for 0.13% of the vote. In 2018 the United Roma Party joined five other parties in demanding the resignation of Gjergj Dedaj, after he referred to Turkey and Serbia as “cruel rulers” who are seeking to regain their influence in Kosovo.

In the 2019 parliamentary election, the party won 0.12% of the popular vote and 1 seat in the assembly.

== Election results ==
Note: Of the four assembly seats reserved for the Roma, Ashkali, and Egyptian communities, one seat is specifically reserved for the Roma, one for the Ashkali, and one for the Egyptian community. The fourth seat is assigned to the community with the highest overall votes.

Assembly of Kosovo
Year	Popular vote	% of vote	Overall seats won	RAE seats	+/–	Government
2007	600	0.10	1 / 120	1 / 4	New	Opposition
2010	690	0.10	1 / 120	1 / 4	0	Opposition
2014	642	0.09	0 / 120	0 / 4	▼1	Extra-parliamentary
2017	955	0.13	1 / 120	1 / 4	▲1	Opposition
2019	1,078	0.13	1 / 120	1 / 4	0	Opposition
2021	1,074	0.12	0 / 120	0 / 4	▼1	Extra-parliamentary
Feb 2025	1,350	0.14	1 / 120	1 / 4	▲1	Snap election
Dec 2025	929	0.10	0 / 120	0 / 4	0	Extra-parliamentary
2026	905	0.11	1 / 120	1 / 4	▲1	TBA
