= Turkish Democratic Party of Kosovo =

Kosovar political party

Turkish Democratic Party of Kosovo Kosova Demokratik Türk Partisi Partia Demokratike Turke e Kosovës
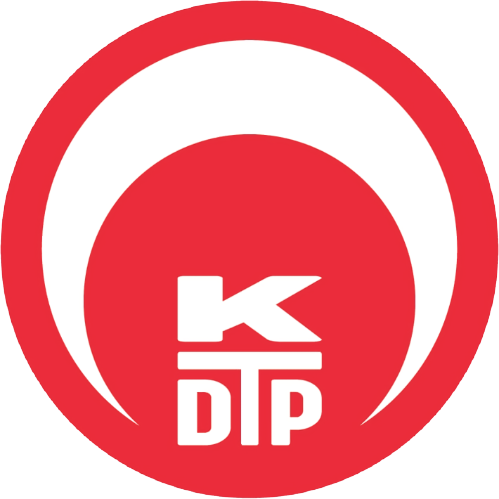
- Abbreviation: KDTP
- Chairman: Fikrim Damka
- Leader of the Parliamentary Group: Enis Kervan
- Founded: 19 July 1990 (as the Turkish Democratic Union)
- Headquarters: Sheshi i Lidhjes, 47; Prizren, Kosovo
- Ideology: Turkish minority interests
- Political position: Centre-right to right-wing
- Colours: Red, white
- Assembly: 2 / 120
- Mayors: 1 / 38

Website
- www.kdtp.org

The Turkish Democratic Party of Kosovo (Turkish: Kosova Demokratik Türk Partisi, Albanian: Partia Demokratike Turke e Kosovës) is a political party in Kosovo that represents the Turkish minority. It is led by Mahir Yağcılar, the Minister of Environment and Spatial Planning in the Thaçi-led government.

It was founded as Turkish Democratic Union (Türk Demokratik Birliği) on 19 July 1990 in Prizren and changed its name to the Turkish Democratic Party of Kosovo on 20 June 2001 under UNMIK. The party's seat is in Prizren and has Mamuša as a stronghold.

At the 2004 legislative elections, the Turkish Democratic Party of Kosovo won 1.2% of the popular vote and 3 out of 120 seats. At the 2007 elections, the party kept its 3 seats in the Assembly of Kosovo, one being from the main list of candidates (Mahir Yağcılar) and two being seats reserved for the Turkish minority (Enis Kervan, Müfera Şinik).

== Election results ==
Assembly of Kosovo
Election	Votes	%	Total seats won	Turkish seats won	+/−
2001	7,879	1.00	3 / 120	3 / 3	New
2004	8,353	1.21	3 / 120	3 / 3	0
2007	4,999	0.87	3 / 120	3 / 3	0
2010	8,548	1.22	3 / 120	3 / 3	0
2014	7,424	1.02	2 / 120	2 / 2	▼1
2017	7,852	1.08	2 / 120	2 / 2	0
2019	6,788	0.81	2 / 120	2 / 2	0
2021	6,496	0.75	2 / 120	2 / 2	0
Feb 2025	4,620	0.55	2 / 120	2 / 2	0
Dec 2025	5,410	0.57	2 / 120	2 / 2	0
2026	5,709	0.70	2 / 120	2 / 2	0

== Notes ==
a.
