= Albanian Christian Democratic Party of Kosovo =

Albanian Christian Democratic Party of Kosovo Partia Shqiptare Demokristane e Kosovës
- Leader: Zef Morina
- Founded: 4 November 1990
- Headquarters: Pristina
- Ideology: Christian democracy Albanian nationalism Social conservatism Pro-Europeanism
- Political position: Centre-right
- Colours: Red, Black (Colours of the Albanian flag), Yellow, Blue
- Assembly: 0 / 120
- Councillors: 4 / 994

Website
- web.archive.org/web/20200920114312/http://www.pshdk.com/

The Albanian Christian Democratic Party of Kosovo (Albanian: Partia Shqiptare Demokristiane e Kosovës, PSHDK) is a political party in Kosovo. It embraces Christian-democratic ideals in Kosovo, although not all of its members are Catholic, as is the case in some other countries.

The president of Albanian Christian Democratic Party of Kosovo is Nikë Gjeloshi.

The Albanian Christian Democratic Party of Kosovo is a close ally of the Democratic League of Kosovo (LDK), consequently, the first post-war minister of transport and telecommunications of the Kosovo Government was a member of PShDK. The Albanian Christian Democratic Party of Kosovo platform supports Kosovo independence and like all other Kosovo Albanian political parties does not take part in the general elections in Serbia nor any other election or referendum organized by the Serbian parliament.

== Election results ==
Election	Votes	%	Seats	+/–
1992	23,303	3.10 (#4)	7 / 140	▲7
2001	7,701	4.76 (#8)	1 / 120	▼6
2004	12,427	1.80 (#5)	2 / 120	▲1
2007	57,002	9.97 (#4)	2 / 140	0

== See also ==
- Simon Augustini, vice-chairman of PShDK.
- Albanian Union of Christian Democrats
