= Vakat Coalition =

Bosniak political alliance in Kosovo

Coalition Vakat Koalicija Vakat Koalicioni Vakat
- Leader: Rasim Demiri
- Founded: June 2004; 22 years ago
- Headquarters: Prizren
- Ideology: Bosniak minority interests
- Political position: Centre
- Assembly: 1 / 120

The Coalition Vakat (Bosnian: Koalicija Vakat; sometimes translated as the Vakat Coalition) is a Bosniak political coalition in Kosovo founded in June 2004 made up of the Democratic Party of Bosniaks (DSB), Democratic Party Vatan (DSV), and the Bosniak Party of Kosovo (BSK). The coalition uses the colors green, yellow, and sky blue. Its headquarters is located in Prizren.

== Election results ==
Assembly of Kosovo
Year	Popular vote	% of vote	Overall seats won	Bosniak seats	+/–
2001 (Note: As the Democratic Party of Bosniacs (DSB).)	9,030	1.15	2 / 120	2 / 3	New
2004	4,972	0.72	3 / 120	3 / 3	▲1
2007	5,428	0.95	3 / 120	3 / 3	0
2010	5,296	0.76	2 / 120	2 / 3	▼1
2014	6,476	0.89	2 / 120	2 / 3	0
2017	6,444	0.89	2 / 120	2 / 3	0
2019	7,075	0.84	2 / 120	2 / 3	0
2021	5,949	0.68	1 / 120	1 / 3	▼1
Feb 2025	3,204	0.38	1 / 120	1 / 3	0
Dec 2025	3,983	0.42	1 / 120	1 / 3	0
2026	3,910	0.48	1 / 120	1 / 3	0

== See also ==
- Party of Democratic Action (Kosovo)
