= Democratic League of Kosovo =

Kosovar political party

Democratic League of Kosovo Lidhja Demokratike e Kosovës
- Abbreviation: LDK
- Leader: Lumir Abdixhiku
- Parliamentary leader: Jehona Lushaku Sadriu
- Founder: Ibrahim Rugova
- Founded: 23 December 1989; 36 years ago
- Headquarters: Pristina
- Youth wing: Forumi Rinor i Lidhjes Demokratike të Kosovës
- Women's wing: Forumi i Grave i Lidhjes Demokratike të Kosovës
- Ideology: Liberal conservatism; Social conservatism; Economic liberalism; 1989–2014: Albanian nationalism
- Political position: Centre-right; 1989–2014: Right-wing
- European affiliation: European People's Party (observer)
- Colours: Red; Black
- Assembly: 18 / 120 (15%)
- Mayors: 7 / 38 (18%)
- Municipal councils: 203 / 994 (20%)

Party flag

Website
- lidhjademokratike.eu

The Democratic League of Kosovo (Albanian: Lidhja Demokratike e Kosovës, LDK) is the oldest and one of the largest political parties in Kosovo.

== History ==
During the late 1980s, nationalism was on the rise throughout the Socialist Federal Republic of Yugoslavia. Since 1974 the province of Kosovo, although part of the Socialist Republic of Serbia, was a self-governed entity over which the Serbian parliament had almost no factual control (see Political status of Kosovo). In the late 1980s, civil unrest which had been striking the province for decades, suddenly erupted further in Kosovo as ethnic Albanians demanded more autonomy (in view of becoming the 7th Yugoslav Republic). At the same time, Serbian Communists' leader Slobodan Milošević used the situation in Kosovo as a political means to win popularity among Serbs. In 1989, he abolished the autonomy of Kosovo using amendments to the Serbian Constitution, reverting Kosovo to its pre-1974 status, thus restoring Serbia's control of the province. In response, a group of Albanian intellectuals gathered the same year to form the Democratic League of Kosovo, which opposed these measures, as well as the ratification of Kosovo's parliament in 1990 which returned the level of Kosovo's autonomy to how it had been sixteen years earlier.

Because of its ideology, which was deemed nationalist and separatist, it was banned by the Yugoslavian authorities, together with the self-styled shadow Kosovo Parliament that opposed the ratifications of Kosovo's real assembly in July 1990. As a result, its members proclaimed in protest on the steps of the parliament building the "Republic of Kosova", independent from Yugoslavia, which drafted its own constitution. Claiming that conditions for Albanians were not addressed, the LDK successfully called for a boycott of the Kosovar Albanians of the first free elections in 1990. Following the 1991 population census, in which LDK President Rugova also called for boycott, resulting in only 9,091 Albanians recorded which composed around 2.53% of the Kosovar population, the LDK called the Albanian people to leave and boycott all state institutions until the solution of the Albanian national question. The LDK opposed the centralized control imposed by Belgrade, which reintroduced the Serbian language as the language of Kosovo as well as making other implementations; and they were growing deeply concerned about Belgrade's handling of the Albanian populace with regards to the wider group interests.

By the spring of 1991, the LDK had support from the diaspora in Zürich, Stuttgart and Brussels and numbered a massive membership of approximately 700,000 people. In September 1991 the LDK-constituted shadow Albanian parliament of the self-styled Republic of Kosova adopted a resolution supporting full-scale "Independence and Sovereignty of Kosovo". The LDK then led the "Coordinating Committee of Albanian Political Parties in Yugoslavia" that included most ethnic Albanian political parties in the country. The decision was that only two choices are viable for peace and stability of the region: 1) unification of all Albanian-populated areas in Yugoslavia, or 2) an undivided Albanian state of all Albanians in the Balkans

The LDK was one of the chief organizers of a poorly organized referendum for self-determination in 1992, in which 87% of Kosovo's Albanian population (numbering 80% of the province's population) voted for independence. The referendum was declared illegal and further drove a rift between Albanians and Serbians in Kosovo. In 1992 the Federal Republic of Yugoslavia was formed and Kosovo remained an autonomous province of the Republic of Serbia. The LDK successfully called for Albanians, including those in Central Serbia and in the Preševo Valley, to boycott of general elections.

The LDK expressed bitterness when Kosovo was ignored during the Dayton Accords in 1995. Supporting an Albanian resistance movement the "National Movement for the Liberation of Kosovo", it abandoned its support of the subsequently organized Kosovo Liberation Army, which used violent means to achieve its goals. After 1997, the government of Albania changed, with a first democratic cabinet formed. Most LDK members abandoned the desire to unite Kosovo with Albania at this point. The LDK's desire for a peaceful solution to the Kosovo conflict lost support among the population and was replaced by the militarist KLA when war erupted in late 1998 and 1999 between the KLA and the Yugoslavian and Serbian forces. Severe atrocities against the Albanian population in Kosovo met with harsh criticism from the LDK. With recommendations from the United States, the LDK abandoned pursuits for an independent Kosovo and sought negotiations with Belgrade with a goal of achieving a substantial level of autonomy for Kosovo, with Ibrahim Rugova traveling to Belgrade and meeting President Milošević (now federal leader) on this matter. This act was criticized by the Albanian public and further downgraded the LDK's popularity. After the NATO bombing campaign in 1999, leading LDK members were present for the signing of the Kumanovo Treaty that adopted United Nations Security Council Resolution 1244 and formalized the cessation of hostilities in Kosovo. However, despite their support of Resolution 1244, which mandates significant autonomy for Kosovo while recognizing the "sovereignty and territorial integrity" of Yugoslavia, the LDK continually supported the independence of Kosovo. It is suspected that hundreds of supporters of the Democratic League of Kosovo were kidnapped, tortured and some killed in secret prisons of the Kosovo Liberation Army, mainly between 1998 and 2001, because perceived as rivals of the Democratic Party of Kosovo. While still the second largest political party in Kosovo, the LDK's support has steadily declined since Kosovo's first elections (municipal) in 2001. Other political parties, including those linked to the former Kosovo Liberation Army, such as the Democratic Party of Kosovo (PDK) and the Alliance for the Future of Kosovo (AAK), have scored much gains at LDK's expense. The party is presided by a president and five vice-presidents.

At the legislative elections held on 24 October 2004 the party won 45.4% of the popular vote and 47 out of 120 seats, seven of which have defected to the Nexhat Daci-led Democratic League of Dardania. One of the founding members, Ibrahim Rugova was the president of the party as the president of Kosovo until his death, on 21 January 2006. At the last legislative elections held on 17 November 2007, the party won only 22.6% and 25 seats but went on to form a Coalition government with Hashim Thaçi's Democratic Party of Kosovo (PDK). In October 2010, the LDK withdrew from the coalition.

On May 10th, 2026, Vjosa Osmani, the former president, seeking return in Kosovo's snap elections, formally joined the party.

== Ideology ==
The Party initially started out as an Albanian nationalist right-wing movement which campaigned for Kosovan independence. It was then led by Ibrahim Rugova a moderate leader who separated with the Kosovo Liberation Army faction. After the war the party remained under the conservative leadership of Rugova. The party also adopted several pro-European policies as well as moving farther to the centre of the political spectrum. However, after Rugovas' death the party went through a period of turmoil with several factions vying for control over the party. The more liberal-conservative stance of Fatmir Sejdiu took over, leading to Nexhat Daci and 6 other MAs forming the more conservative Democratic League of Dardania.

After losing seats consistently under Sejdius leadership unrest within the party began to grow and before the Kosovan parliamentary election, 2010 Isa Mustafa emerged as the new leader securing more than two thirds of the votes. Mustafa's leadership has seen the party return to the more hardline conservative stance, and some politicians have even come to describe the League as a social conservative party as well.

Critics have said the party has considerably abandoned their traditional, Kosovo-Albanian nationalist policies and policies of their founder Ibrahim Rugova. Since August 2014, it has been attacked by Vetëvendosje on that front.

The Democratic League of Kosovo has been described as centrist, centre-right and right-wing.

== Controversies ==
Former party leader Isa Mustafa had over 70 cases submitted to the prosecutor over alleged abuse of office while serving as Prishtina mayor. These cases were all thrown out from the prosecutors in charge as the former mayor had no ties with the cases submitted. Former Minister of Culture Astrit Haraqia has been accused of abusing office during 2004–2007 as well as being involved in a large scheme to sell Schengen visas with other party official Ukë Rugova. Suspected of corruption is also current MP Naser Osmani for alleged wrongdoings while in the board of Kosovo Privatisation Agency. He ran and gained a seat in the Assembly despite the accusations. Former Obiliq municipality mayor Mehmet Krasniqi is being investigated for abuse of office. Mehmet Krasniqi has since been found not guilty on the charges.

Former MP of the Democratic League of Kosovo Uke Rugova, the son of former President Ibrahim Rugova, was accused for alleged involvement in a visa scam by the European Union Rule of Law Mission in Kosovo. Kosovo’s Special Prosecution had filed an indictment against Uke Rugova and a number of other individuals linked with the Democratic League of Kosovo over an alleged scam concerning Italian visas. Police from the European Union Rule of Law Mission in Kosovo first arrested him in February 2014 when he was a member of the Assembly of the Republic of Kosovo, according to the charges, Uke Rugova led a criminal group that falsified travel documents for Kosovo nationals.

In October 2020, the Hoti government drafted the Recovery plan which provided assistance to businesses. In the list made by the Minister of Finance, Labor and Transfers of Kosovo Hekuran Murati a total of 50 businesses had benefited 60 million euros from the recovery package drafted by the Hoti Government. The Recovery plan fueled big businesses in Kosovo instead of small ones, "Viva Fresh" had been given over 860 thousand euros, "Elkos" of Ramiz Kelmendi with over 675 thousand euros, "Proex" with over 335 thousand euros, "HIB Petrol" with over 307 thousand euros. In the Recovery plan also benefited the security company "Balkan International SHPK" which is owned by Besnik Berisha, a former advisor to Isa Mustafa when he was Prime Minister of Kosovo, his company received over 100 thousand euros.

== Chairman of the LDK, 1989–present ==
| # | President | Born–Died | Term start | Term end | Time in office |
|---|---|---|---|---|---|
| 1 | Ibrahim Rugova | 1944–2006 | 23 December 1989 | 21 January 2006 | 16 years, 29 days |
| 2 | Fatmir Sejdiu | 1951– | 9 December 2006 | 7 November 2010 | 3 years, 333 days |
| 3 | Isa Mustafa | 1951– | 7 November 2010 | 14 March 2021 | 10 years, 127 days |
| 4 | Lumir Abdixhiku | 1983 – | 14 March 2021 | Incumbent | 5 years, 237 days |

== Elections results ==
=== Parliamentary results ===
| Year | Votes | %Votes | Seats won | Position | +/– | Government | Leader |
|---|---|---|---|---|---|---|---|
| 1992 | 574,755 | 76.44% | 96 / 140 | ▲1st | ▲96 | Coalition | Ibrahim Rugova |
| 2001 | 359,851 | 45.7% | 47 / 120 | 1st | ▼49 | Coalition | Ibrahim Rugova |
| 2004 | 313,437 | 45.4% | 47 / 120 | 1st | Steady | Coalition | Ibrahim Rugova |
| 2007 | 129,410 | 22.6% | 25 / 120 | ▼2nd | ▼23 | Coalition | Fatmir Sejdiu |
| 2010 | 172,552 | 24.7% | 27 / 120 | 2nd | ▲2 | Opposition | Isa Mustafa |
| 2014 | 184,596 | 25.2% | 30 / 120 | 2nd | ▲3 | Coalition | Isa Mustafa |
| 2017 | 185,892 | 25.5% | 23 / 120 | ▼3rd | ▼7 | Opposition | Isa Mustafa |
| 2019 | 206,516 | 24.5% | 28 / 120 | ▲2nd | ▲5 | Coalition | Isa Mustafa |
| 2021 | 110,985 | 12.7% | 15 / 120 | ▼3rd | ▼13 | Opposition | Isa Mustafa |
| Feb 2025 | 171,249 | 18.28% | 20 / 120 | 3rd | ▲5 | Snap election | Lumir Abdixhiku |
| Dec 2025 | 126,163 | 13.24% | 15 / 120 | 3rd | ▼5 | Opposition | Lumir Abdixhiku |
| 2026 | 135,559 | 16.69% | 18 / 120 | 3rd | ▲3 | Opposition | Lumir Abdixhiku |

=== Municipal mayor results ===
| Municipalities | Election year | No. of overall votes | % of overall vote | Seats | | | Government |
| Municipalities | Election year | No. of overall votes | % of overall vote | No. | ± | Position | Government |
|---|---|---|---|---|---|---|---|
| Gjilan | 2017 | 21,261 | 63.81 (1st) ▲ | 11 / 35 | 0 | 1st | LDK |
| Istog | 2017 | 10,033 | 50.03 (1st) ▼ | 11 / 27 | ▼1 | 1st | LDK |
| Kosovo Polje | 2017 | 9,821 | 63.84 (1st) ▼ | 12 / 27 | 0 | 1st | LDK |
| Lipjan | 2017 | 17,019 | 59.51 (1st) ▲ | 12 / 31 | ▲3 | ▲1st | LDK-AKR |
| Peja | 2017 | 22,014 | 50.23 (1st) ▼ | 15 / 35 | ▲5 | 1st | LDK-PDK |
| Viti | 2017 | 10,768 | 51.65 (1st) ▲ | 10 / 27 | ▲1 | 1st | LDK-AAK |
| Vushtrri | 2017 | 15,122 | 54.24 (1st) ▲ | 6 / 35 | ▼1 | ▲1st | LDK |
