= Mahir Yağcılar =

Mahir Yağcılar (Serbo-Croatian: Mahir Jagčular; Albanian: Mahir Jaxhilar) (born 6 May 1961 in Prizren, FPR Yugoslavia, modern Kosovo) is a Turkish Kosovar politician and the president of Turkish nationalist and conservative Turkish Democratic Party of Kosovo (KDTP).

Yağcılar graduated from Faculty of Traffic and Communications at the University of Sarajevo in 1984. He had worked as a manager at the Kosovar transportation company Kosovatrans. In April 2000, he was elected the president of KDTP (then Turkish Democratic Union). He had served as the Minister of Health and Assembly of Kosovo presidency member under United Nations Interim Administration Mission in Kosovo. Since 2008, he is the Minister of Environment and Spatial Planning of the Kosovo in the Hashim Thaçi government.

On 12 September 2010, Yağcılar was removed from his post as the chairman of KDTP. Arif Bütüç (Mamusha mayor) and Orhan Lopar were expected to replace Yağcılar in joint leadership but Yağcılar was restored. Yağcılar's rival Bütüç was expelled from the party on 19 October 2011, enabling Yağcılar further bolster his rule.

== Sources ==
- Profile at the Ministry website
- "THE POLITICAL ENTITIES RUNNING FOR THE 2004 ASSEMBLY ELECTION" – Organization for Security and Co-operation in Europe 2004 elections pamphlet
