= Democratic Ashkali Party of Kosovo =

Democratic Ashkali Party of Kosovo Partia Demokratike e Ashkalive të Kosovës
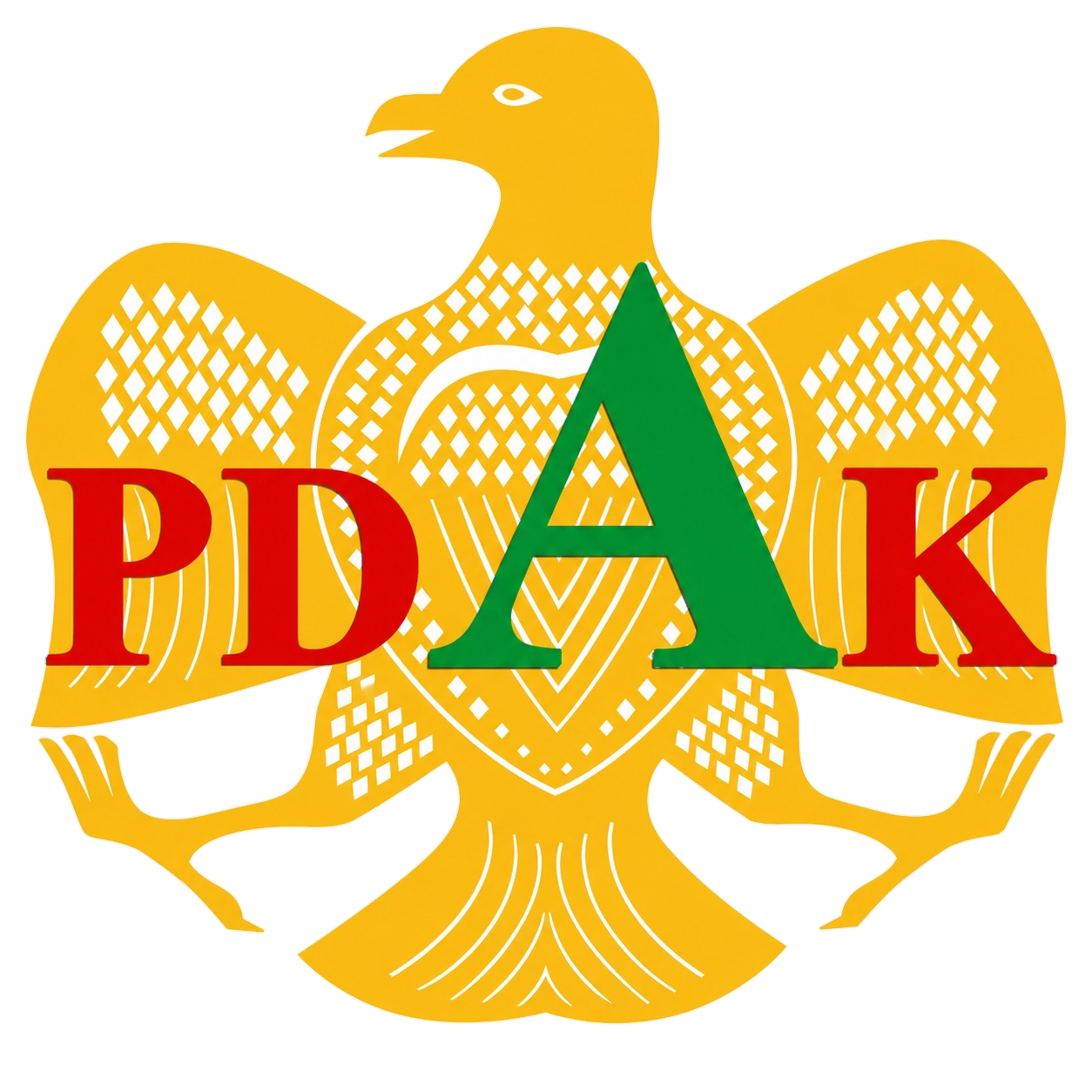
- Abbreviation: PDAK
- Ideology: Ashkali minority interests
- Seats in the Assembly of the Republic of Kosovo: 0 / 120
- Minority Seats reserved for the Romani, Ashkali, and Egyptians.: 0 / 4

The Democratic Ashkali Party of Kosovo (Albanian: Partia Demokratike e Ashkalive të Kosovës; PDAK) is an Ashkali political party in Kosovo.

At the legislative elections held on 24 October 2004, the party won 1 out of 120 seats. They lost their seat in the 2019 election.
