= Third cabinet of Albin Kurti =

Current government of Kosovo

Third Kurti cabinet
- Sixteenth cabinet of Kosovo
- 11 February 2026–13 September 2026
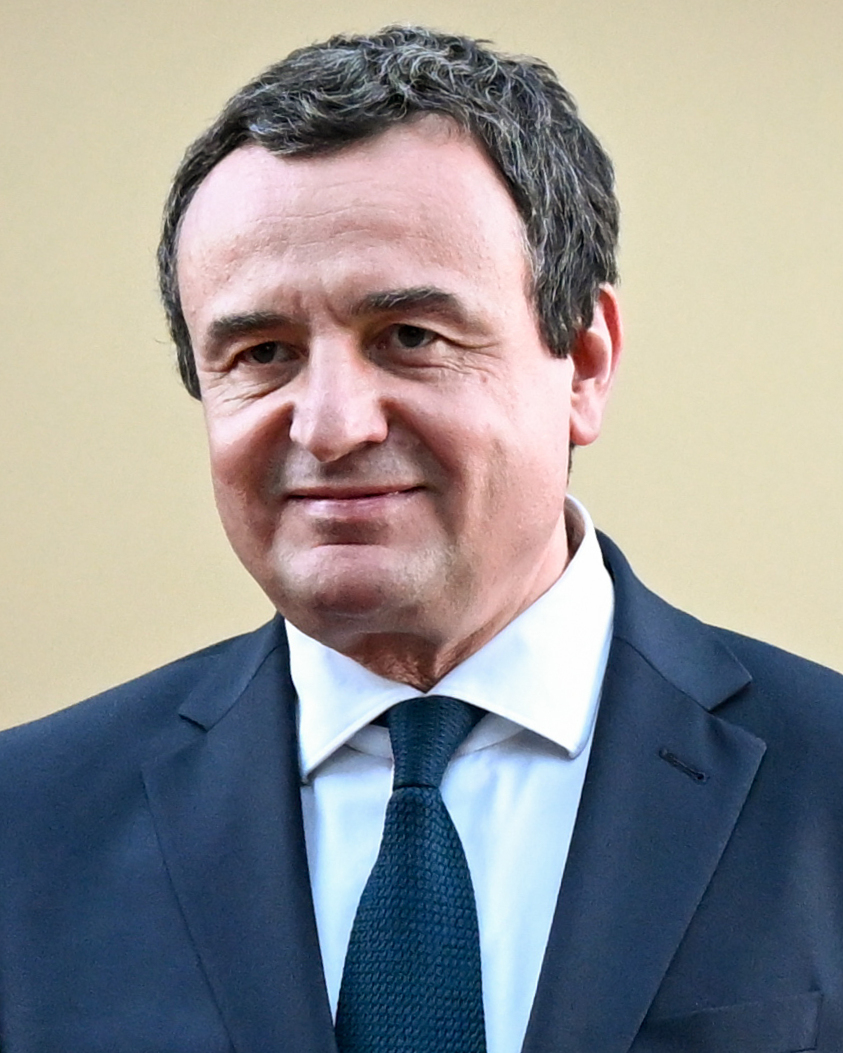
- Date formed: 11 February 2026
- Date dissolved: 13 September 2026

People and organisations
- Head of state: Vjosa Osmani; Albulena Haxhiu (acting)
- Head of government: Albin Kurti
- Deputy head of government: Glauk Konjufca; Donika Gërvalla-Schwarz; Fikrim Damka
- Member parties: LVV, GUXO, ALTERNATIVA, KDTP, IRDK, VAKAT, ZSPO, with support from LPRK, NDS, PLE and PSA
- Status in legislature: Majority (until April 2026); Caretaker (from April 2026)
- Opposition parties: PDK, LDK, AAK, SL, SDU, JGP
- Opposition leaders: Bedri Hamza (PDK); Lumir Abdixhiku (LDK); Ramush Haradinaj (AAK); Igor Simić (SL); Duda Balje (SDU); Adem Hodža (JGP)

History
- Election: 28 December 2025
- Legislature term: 10th legislature of the Assembly
- Predecessor: Kurti II
- Successor: Kurti IV

The Third Kurti cabinet was formed in Kosovo on 11 February 2026 and is serving as the acting government of the Republic of Kosovo, following a coalition agreement between the political parties Vetëvendosje, Guxo, Progressive Democratic Party, New Democratic Initiative of Kosovo, Turkish Democratic Party of Kosovo, Vakat Coalition and New Democratic Party.

The government entered a caretaker role after the President of Kosovo dissolved the Assembly of Kosovo as it failed to elect a new president within the constitutional deadline, and thus triggering new parliamentary elections.

== Actions ==
On 26 October 2025, LVV nominated Albin Kurti as prime minister-designate, but his cabinet failed to secure the 61 votes required, receiving 56 in favor, 52 against, and 4 abstentions. A second attempt with Glauk Konjufca on 19 November also failed, with 56 votes in favor, 53 against, and 4 abstentions.

A fresh election on 28 December gave Vetëvendosje near-majority, ending the deadlock. Albulena Haxhiu was elected Assembly Speaker with 66 votes on 11 February 2026. Later that day, Albin Kurti's third cabinet was approved, including nine nominees from the previous failed attempts.

== Composition ==
The cabinet consists of the following ministers:

Portfolio	Minister	Took office	Left office	Party
Prime Minister of Kosovo	Albin Kurti	11 February 2026	13 September 2026	LVV
First Deputy Prime Minister and Minister of Foreign Affairs	Glauk Konjufca	11 February 2026	13 September 2026	LVV
Second Deputy Prime Minister and Minister of Justice	Donika Gërvalla-Schwarz	11 February 2026	13 September 2026	Guxo
Third Deputy Prime Minister for Minority Issues and Human Rights	Fikrim Damka	11 February 2026	13 September 2026	KDTP
Ministry of Agriculture, Forestry and Rural Development	Armend Muja	11 February 2026	13 September 2026	LVV
Minister of Communities and Return	Nenad Rašić	11 February 2026	13 September 2026	ZSPO
Minister of Culture and Tourism	Saranda Bogujevci	11 February 2026	13 September 2026	LVV
Minister of Defence	Ejup Maqedonci	11 February 2026	13 September 2026	LVV
Minister of Economy	Artane Rizvanolli	11 February 2026	13 September 2026	LVV
Minister of Education, Science and Technology and Innovation	Hajrulla Çeku	11 February 2026	13 September 2026	LVV
Minister of Environment and Spatial Planning	Fitore Pacolli	11 February 2026	13 September 2026	LVV
Minister of Finance	Hekuran Murati	11 February 2026	13 September 2026	LVV
Minister of Health	Arben Vitia	11 February 2026	13 September 2026	LVV
Minister of Industry, Entrepreneurship and Trade	Mimoza Kusari-Lila	11 February 2026	13 September 2026	Alternativa
Minister of Infrastructure and Transport	Dimal Basha	11 February 2026	13 September 2026	LVV
Minister of Internal Affairs	Xhelal Sveçla	11 February 2026	13 September 2026	LVV
Minister for Labour, Family, Social Welfare and Values of the Liberation War	Andin Hoti	11 February 2026	13 September 2026	LVV
Minister of Local Administration	Elbert Krasniqi	11 February 2026	13 September 2026	IRDK
Minister of Public Administration and Digitalization	Lulëzon Jagxhiu	11 February 2026	13 September 2026	LVV
Minister of Regional Development	Rasim Demiri	11 February 2026	13 September 2026	Vakat
Minister of Youth and Sports	Blerim Gashani	11 February 2026	13 September 2026	Guxo
