= 2026 Kosovan parliamentary election =

- 7 June 2026
- All 120 seats in the Assembly; 61 seats needed for a majority
- Turnout: 41.45% (▼6.23pp)
Party	Leader	Vote %	Seats	+/–
LVV (Note: Running with PSHDK, Guxo, and Alternativa.)	Albin Kurti	47.13	53	−4
PDK	Bedri Hamza	19.44	22	0
LDK	Vjosa Osmani (Note: Although Lumir Abdixhiku is the leader of the LDK and its candidate for Prime Minister, Vjosa Osmani is the list carrier and the party's candidate for President.)	16.69	18	+3
AAK	Ardian Gjini	6.74	7	+1
Minority seats
SL	Zlatan Elek	5.40	9	0
KDTP	Fikrim Damka	0.70	2	0
ZSPO	Nenad Rašić	0.67	1	0
Vakat	Rasim Demiri	0.48	1	0
IRDK	Elbert Krasniqi	0.43	1	0
SDU	Duda Balje	0.33	1	0
NDS	Emilija Redžepi	0.33	1	0
PSA	Artan Asllani	0.32	1	0
PLE	Veton Berisha	0.27	1	0
JGP	Adem Hodža	0.20	1	0
PREBK	Aljbert Kinoli	0.11	1	+1
This lists parties that won seats. See the complete results below.
Results by municipality
Prime Minister before	Prime Minister after
Albin Kurti; LVV	Albin Kurti; LVV

Parliamentary elections were held in Kosovo on 7 June 2026. The elections follow a constitutional crisis triggered by the Assembly's failure to elect a president.

After an unsuccessful vote on 5 March 2026, President Vjosa Osmani issued a decree dissolving the Assembly. The decree was challenged by Vetëvendosje before the Constitutional Court of Kosovo, which suspended it on 9 March.

On 25 March, the Court ruled that the dissolution had no legal effect and gave the Assembly 34 days to elect a president. After the Assembly failed to do so by 28 April, it was dissolved in accordance with the Court's decision, and acting president Albulena Haxhiu set 7 June 2026 as the date for new parliamentary elections.

== Electoral system ==
The 120 members of the Assembly are elected by open list proportional representation for a four-year term, with 20 reserved for national minorities. Seats are allocated using the D'Hondt method with an electoral threshold of 5%.

== Parties and coalitions ==
General parties and coalitions (100 seats)
No.	Party or coalition	Candidate for prime minister	Motto
113	Democratic League of Kosovo (LDK); PD, PBKDSH (candidates run inside LDK list)	Lumir Abdixhiku	Bashkohu; Join
116	Lëvizja Vetëvendosje Coalition; Vetëvendosje (VV), Guxo, Alternativa and PSHDK	Albin Kurti	Krejt për shtet, shtet për krejt All for the state, the state for all
124	Fjala	Gëzim Kelmendi	Me besim With trust
125	Democratic Party of Kosovo (PDK)	Bedri Hamza	Ndrysho Kosovën; Change Kosovo
128	Alliance for the Future of Kosovo (AAK)	Ardian Gjini	Siguri, Energji, Zhvillim; Security, Energy, Development
129	Social Democratic Party of Kosovo (PSD)	Dardan Molliqaj	Për një opozitë përnime For a real opposition

Serbian parties and coalitions (10 seats)
No.	Party or coalition	List carrier	Motto
119	Serb List (SL)	Zlatan Elek	Jedna lista - Jedan narod One list - One people
127	For Freedom, Justice and Survival (SPO)	Nenad Rašić	Svoj život u svoje ruke Take your life into your own hands

Other minority parties and coalitions (10 seats)
Minority	No.	Party or coalition	List carrier
Ashkali, Egyptian and Romani (4 seats)	112	New Democratic Initiative of Kosovo (IRDK)	Elbert Krasniqi
Ashkali, Egyptian and Romani (4 seats)	130	United Roma Party of Kosovo (PREBK)	Aljbert Kinoli
Ashkali, Egyptian and Romani (4 seats)	131	Egyptian Liberal Party (PLE)	Veton Berisha
Ashkali, Egyptian and Romani (4 seats)	117	Kosovar New Romani Party (KNRP)	Joldži Šalja
Ashkali, Egyptian and Romani (4 seats)	111	Ashkali Social Democratic Party (PSA)	Artan Asllani
Ashkali, Egyptian and Romani (4 seats)	123	Progressive Movement of Kosovar Roma (LPRK)	Erxhan Galjushi
Ashkali, Egyptian and Romani (4 seats)	121	Ashkalitë e Bashkuar (ASH)	Etem Arifi
Bosniak (3 seats)	118	New Democratic Party (NDS)	Emilija Redžepi
Bosniak (3 seats)	126	Vakat Coalition	Bahrim Šabani
Bosniak (3 seats)	115	Social Democratic Union (SDU)	Duda Balje
Bosniak (3 seats)	120	Independent	Esmir Kasi
Turk (2 seats)	122	Turkish Democratic Party of Kosovo (KDTP)	Fikrim Damka
Gorani (1 seat)	114	Unique Gorani Party (JGP)	Adem Hodža

== Turnout ==
Turnout (only within Kosovo, excl. voters from abroad)
County	11:00	15:00	19:00
Deçan	7.03%	20.48%	32.22%
Gjakova	7.51%	18.37%	29.23%
Gllogovci	6.35%	20.16%	34.81%
Gjilan	8.91%	24.72%	39.18%
Dragash	3.50%	12.67%	23.87%
Istog	6.67%	19.28%	31.42%
Kaçanik	8.83%	25.46%	42.71%
Klina	5.13%	15.99%	26.84%
Kosovo Polje	9.34%	25.86%	41.19%
Kamenica	8.18%	24.23%	37.76%
Mitrovica	8.35%	23.31%	36.50%
Leposavić	8.91%	44.42%	54.23%
Lipjan	8.42%	23.50%	39.93%
Novo Brdo	18.09%	39.75%	51.17%
Obiliq	9.13%	28.07%	44.38%
Rahovec	4.90%	15.59%	28.25%
Peja	8.06%	21.65%	33.81%
Podujeva	7.25%	23.74%	39.75%
Pristina	11.36%	29.85%	47.02%
Prizren	6.15%	17.94%	30.36%
Skenderaj	5.94%	20.75%	32.53%
Shtime	8.85%	23.83%	41.06%
Štrpce	11.29%	29.84%	48.92%
Suva Reka	7.58%	19.40%	32.57%
Ferizaj	9.25%	24.82%	41.50%
Viti	7.06%	20.42%	34.92%
Vushtrri	8.60%	24.77%	39.94%
Zubin Potok	13.99%	39.88%	55.26%
Zvečan	21.59%	41.67%	54.45%
Malisheva	5.38%	17.03%	29.07%
Junik	7.52%	19.63%	31.33%
Mamusha	6.31%	27.94%	44.26%
Hani i Elezit	8.09%	23.09%	36.72%
Gračanica	19.18%	36.87%	47.08%
Ranilug	19.22%	43.46%	55.29%
Parteš	11.67%	31.15%	41.93%
Klokot	9.85%	29.37%	44.00%
North Mitrovica	18.72%	32.00%	40.96%
Kosovo	8.34%	22.99%	36.88%

== Results ==
Vetëvendosje finished first in the parliamentary elections, securing its fifth consecutive victory and remaining the largest party by a significant margin. However, the party lost support compared to the December 2025 election, while opposition parties made gains. With the backing of nine minority representatives, Vetëvendosje subsequently formed the Fourth cabinet of Albin Kurti. Voter turnout was 37.03%, the lowest recorded in Kosovo’s electoral history, reflecting widespread political fatigue and frustration with repeated elections and ongoing political instability.

Graph of the party split among 120 seats.
Party	Votes	%	Seats	+/–
Vetëvendosje	382,869	47.13	53	–4
Democratic Party of Kosovo	157,892	19.44	22	0
Democratic League of Kosovo	135,567	16.69	18	+3
Alliance for the Future of Kosovo	54,729	6.74	7	+1
Serb List	43,843	5.40	9	0
Turkish Democratic Party of Kosovo	5,709	0.70	2	0
For Freedom, Justice and Survival	5,447	0.67	1	0
Vakat Coalition	3,910	0.48	1	0
New Democratic Initiative of Kosovo	3,492	0.43	1	0
New Democratic Party	2,693	0.33	1	0
Social Democratic Union	2,682	0.33	1	0
Ashkali Social Democratic Party	2,598	0.32	1	0
Egyptian Liberal Party	2,199	0.27	1	0
Social Democratic Party of Kosovo	2,084	0.26	0	New
Ashkalitë e Bashkuar	1,795	0.22	0	New
Unique Gorani Party	1,650	0.20	1	0
Fjala	929	0.11	0	0
United Roma Party of Kosovo	905	0.11	1	+1
Progressive Movement of Kosovar Roma	729	0.09	0	–1
Kosovar New Romani Party	355	0.04	0	0
Independent	268	0.03	0	0
Total	812,345	100.00	120	0
Valid votes	812,345	100.00		
Invalid/blank votes	0	0.00		
Total votes	812,345	100.00		
Registered voters/turnout	1,959,962	41.45		
Source: KQZ

=== By municipality or voting provision ===
Municipality	LVV		PDK		LDK		AAK		SL		Others	
Municipality	Votes	%	Votes	%	Votes	%	Votes	%	Votes	%	Votes	%
Deçan	4,146	27.04	375	2.45	2,846	18.56	7,716	50.33	0	0.00	248	1.62
Gjakova	19,550	50.37	2,543	6.55	4,997	12.87	10,101	26.02	2	0.01	1,622	4.18
Drenas	4,224	20.89	14,510	71.75	725	3.58	503	2.49	0	0.00	262	1.29
Gjilan	26,065	58.10	6,099	13.59	9,228	20.57	1,316	2.93	1,246	2.78	909	2.03
Dragash	3,626	33.36	2,016	18.55	2,546	23.42	99	0.91	78	0.72	2,505	23.04
Istog	7,225	40.18	1,511	8.40	6,614	36.78	1,474	8.20	197	1.10	961	5.34
Kaçanik	8,810	58.65	4,746	31.60	1,151	7.66	213	1.42	1	0.01	100	0.66
Klina	4,666	31.21	3,495	23.38	2,728	18.25	3,393	22.69	115	0.77	554	3.70
Kosovo Polje	12,180	50.96	4,767	19.94	4,002	16.74	703	2.94	395	1.65	1,856	7.77
Kamenica	7,956	57.56	1,894	13.70	2,012	14.56	616	4.46	1,077	7.79	266	1.93
Mitrovica	20,632	62.92	8,122	24.77	2,745	8.37	564	1.72	17	0.05	711	2.17
Leposavić	118	1.78	32	0.48	20	0.30	7	0.11	5,678	85.55	782	11.78
Lipjan	12,511	45.74	6,607	24.15	6,455	23.60	552	2.02	366	1.34	864	3.15
Novo Brdo	966	18.72	280	5.43	411	7.96	113	2.19	3,247	62.91	144	2.79
Obiliq	6,118	52.60	1,347	11.58	2,077	17.86	220	1.89	1,392	11.97	478	4.1
Rahovec	9,285	48.55	3,145	16.45	2,992	15.65	3,076	16.09	255	1.33	370	1.93
Peja	19,400	44.98	3,610	8.37	10,667	24.76	6,275	14.55	348	0.81	2,819	6.53
Podujeva	19,506	55.58	5,214	14.86	8,919	25.41	929	2.65	5	0.01	522	1.49
Pristina	55,644	50.96	19,903	18.23	25,836	23.66	5,475	5.01	301	0.28	2,023	1.86
Prizren	28,517	46.81	12,624	20.72	7,464	12.25	1,809	2.97	56	0.09	10,450	17.16
Skenderaj	2,902	16.23	13,780	77.09	546	3.05	355	1.99	103	0.58	190	1.07
Shtime	6,383	52.44	3,433	28.21	1,740	14.30	217	1.78	1	0.01	397	3.26
Štrpce	813	13.72	392	6.61	177	2.99	25	0.42	4,027	67.95	492	8.31
Suva Reka	10,348	40.47	4,115	16.09	6,807	26.62	3,913	15.30	1	0.00	385	1.52
Ferizaj	30,567	56.75	12,354	22.93	7,521	13.96	1,341	2.49	5	0.01	2,079	3.86
Viti	10,725	56.41	3,205	16.86	4,439	23.35	410	2.16	71	0.37	173	0.85
Vushtrri	19,012	56.91	7,438	23.32	3,459	10.85	531	1.66	929	2.91	525	4.35
Zubin Potok	227	6.45	146	4.15	69	1.96	13	0.37	2,861	81.28	204	5.79
Zvečan	134	3.77	125	3.52	20	0.56	0	0.00	3,169	89.14	176	3.01
Malisheva	6,613	37.30	6,564	37.03	3,231	18.23	1,174	6.62	2	0.01	145	0.81
Junik	773	33.83	123	5.38	698	30.55	678	29.67	0	0.00	13	0.57
Mamusha	124	5.74	53	2.45	13	0.60	35	1.62	1	0.05	1,936	89.54
Hani i Elezit	8,810	58.65	4,746	31.60	1,151	7.66	213	1.42	1	0.01	101	0.66
Gračanica	873	8.05	560	5.16	364	3.36	238	2.19	7,822	72.13	988	9.11
Ranilug	21	0.83	5	0.20	9	0.36	2	0.08	2,195	87.03	292	11.5
Parteš	0	0.00	1	0.05	1	0.05	0	0.00	1,763	90.27	188	9.63
Klokot	428	23.63	150	8.28	163	9.00	30	1.66	901	49.75	139	7.68
North Mitrovica	953	13.78	202	2.92	90	1.30	30	0.43	5,216	75.43	424	6.14
Embassy & Consulate Votes	18,789	83.28	1,608	7.13	1,490	6.60	464	2.06	0	0.00	210	0.91
Total	382,860	47.13	157,894	19.44	135,564	16.69	54,730	6.74	43,838	5.40	37,433	4.59
Including inside of municipalities: Persons with special needs, Conditional and Postal votes
Source:KQZ
