= December 2025 Kosovan parliamentary election =

- 28 December 2025
- All 120 seats in the Assembly; 61 seats needed for a majority
- Turnout: 47.68% (▲1.13pp)
Party	Leader	Vote %	Seats	+/–
LVV (Note: Running with PSHDK, Guxo, and Alternativa.)	Albin Kurti	51.10	57	+9
PDK	Bedri Hamza	20.19	22	−2
LDK	Lumir Abdixhiku	13.24	15	−5
AAK	Ramush Haradinaj	5.50	6	+1
Minority seats
SL	Zlatan Elek	4.49	9	0
KDTP	Fikrim Damka	0.57	2	0
ZSPO	Nenad Rašić	0.51	1	0
Vakat	Rasim Demiri	0.42	1	0
NDS	Emilija Redžepi	0.41	1	0
IRDK	Elbert Krasniqi	0.29	1	0
SDU	Duda Balje	0.27	1	0
PLE	Veton Berisha	0.24	1	0
PSA	Artan Asllani	0.22	1	New
JGP	Adem Hodža	0.16	1	0
LPRK	Erxhan Galushi	0.12	1	+1
This lists parties that won seats. See the complete results below.
Results by municipality
Prime Minister before	Prime Minister after
Albin Kurti; LVV	Albin Kurti; LVV

Parliamentary elections were held in Kosovo on 28 December 2025 to elect the 120 members of the Assembly. In the previous election in February 2025, no party had won a majority of seats, resulting in a hung parliament with Vetëvendosje, party of Prime Minister Albin Kurti, remaining the largest party.

The result was a decisive victory for Vetëvendosje, which gained nine seats, winning 57 in total, just four short of an outright majority.

== Background ==
The February elections saw Vetëvendosje (LVV) winning 48 seats, short of the 61 needed for a majority. Following the election, both PDK and AAK indicated that they would not form a government with LVV. The LDK later announced that it would not support joining a coalition with LVV, instead proposing a transitional government composing all ethnic Albanian parties, though LVV rejected this. As a result, the party was required to seek the support of other minority parties if it wished to form a coalition.

The political crisis in Kosovo began on 15 April, when the country's political parties failed to elect the Speaker of the Assembly of Kosovo, a deadlock that lasted until Dimal Basha was elected speaker on 26 August. From 26 August to 10 October, Kosovo entered another institutional crisis, this time related to the election of the Serbian Deputy Speaker of the Assembly. This crisis was resolved when Nenad Rašić was elected in the position on 10 October, and the Assembly was declared constituted. A first attempt to form a Vetëvendosje government under Albin Kurti was rejected on 26 October. Glauk Konjufca was nominated for prime minister in a second attempt to form a Vetëvendosje government but a parliamentary majority was not secured in a vote on 19 November, resulting in the dissolution of the Assembly the next day.

Following the dissolution of the Assembly on 20 November, President Vjosa Osmani set 28 December 2025 as the date for the election.

== Electoral system ==
The 120 members of the Assembly are elected by open list proportional representation for a four-year term, with 20 reserved for national minorities. Seats were allocated using the D'Hondt method with an electoral threshold of 5%. For overseas voters there were 66 polling stations located in 36 countries around the world.

== Parties and coalitions ==
The application period for political parties seeking certification and submission of candidate lists for the 2025 elections spanned from 24 November to 7 December 2025. A total of 24 political entities submitted applications, including 18 political parties, three coalitions, two civil initiatives, and one independent candidate, with 1,180 candidates nominated.

General parties and coalitions (100 seats)
No.	Party or coalition	Candidate for prime minister	Motto
113	Albanian Democratic National Front Party (PBKDSH)	Alban Hoti	Për familje e atdhe For family and homeland
114	Fjala	Gëzim Kelmendi	Të vendosur Determined
116	Coalition Lëvizja Vetëvendosje; Vetëvendosje (VV), Guxo, Alternativa and PSHDK	Albin Kurti	Mos lësho pe Don't give in
122	Social Democratic Initiative (NISMA)	Fatmir Limaj	Me Fatmir Limaj; With Fatmir Limaj
123	Democratic League of Kosovo (LDK); AKR, PD (candidates run inside LDK list)	Lumir Abdixhiku	Zgjedh shpresën Choose Hope
129	Alliance for the Future of Kosovo (AAK)	Ramush Haradinaj	Krahë teje By your side
130	Democratic Party of Kosovo (PDK)	Bedri Hamza	Bashkë përpara Forward together

Serbian parties and coalitions (10 seats)
No.	Party or coalition	List carrier
121	Kosovski Savez (KS)	Goran Marinković
127	Serb List (SL)	Zlatan Elek
134	For Freedom, Justice and Survival (SPO)	Nenad Rašić

Other minority parties and coalitions (10 seats)
Minority	Party or coalition	List carrier
Ashkali, Egyptian and Romani (4 seats)	New Democratic Initiative of Kosovo (IRDK)	Elbert Krasniqi
Ashkali, Egyptian and Romani (4 seats)	United Roma Party of Kosovo (PREBK)	Aljbert Kinoli
Ashkali, Egyptian and Romani (4 seats)	Egyptian Liberal Party (PLE)	Veton Berisha
Ashkali, Egyptian and Romani (4 seats)	Ashkali Party for Integration (PAI)	Etem Arifi
Ashkali, Egyptian and Romani (4 seats)	Ashkali Social Democratic Party (PSA)	Artan Asllani
Bosniak (3 seats)	New Democratic Party (NDS)	Emilija Redžepi
Bosniak (3 seats)	Vakat Coalition	Bahrim Šabani
Bosniak (3 seats)	Social Democratic Union (SDU)	Duda Balje
Turk (2 seats)	Turkish Democratic Party of Kosovo (KDTP)	Fikrim Damka
Gorani (1 seat)	Unique Gorani Party (JGP)	Adem Hodža

== Campaign ==
Election campaigns in Kosovo are regulated to start 30 days before the scheduled election date and must conclude on the day before the election.

The early days of the campaign saw protests in late November from public and private transport companies in Pristina over financial strains and unpaid salaries that were caused by government failures to approve budgets for both 2025 and 2026. On 30 November, Vetëvendosje formally established the Vetëvendosje Movement Coalition with Guxo, Alternativa, and PSHDK. On 3 December, the Central Election Commission (CEC) rejected the Serb List in running in the December elections. However, the Election Complaints and Appeals Panel (ECAP) overturned the CEC decision on 8 December, allowing the Serb List to run. Amid campaigning in early December, Serb mayors were sworn into office on 5 December in four Serb-majority municipalities in Kosovo, replacing the Albanian mayors that had served in office since 2023. The inauguration of the Serb mayors resulted in Ursula von der Leyen, the President of the European Commission, announcing on 18 December the lifting of sanctions from Kosovo that first began in June 2023 and the releasing of financial assistance in early 2026. Debates over the issues of justice reform, security, energy policy, and governance were held by Kallxo between 17 December and 22 December. On 24 December, four days before the election, Kurti announced that 100 euros will be allocated to children and pensioners at the end of the year, sparking accusations of vote buying.

== Opinion polls ==
=== Party polling ===
Pollster	Date	LVV	PDK	LDK	AAK	NISMA	SL	Other	Abstention	Lead
UBO Consulting	28 December 2025	45.7	22.0	15.6	5.3	1.7	–	9.7	–	23.7
PIPOS	28 December 2025	44.1	23.9	16.1	5.8	1.1	–	9.0	–	20.2
Albanian Post	28 December 2025	43.5	23.6	15.9	7.2	–	–	9.8	–	19.9
UBO Consulting	June 2025	37.3	20.6	16.8	4.6	2.1	3.8	4.3	2.3	17.3
UBO Consulting	March 2025	40.8	20.9	15.7	3.8	0.5	3.0	3.5	6.0	19.9
February 2025 Election	9 February 2025	42.3	21.0	18.3	7.1		4.3	7.2	–	21.4

=== Seat projections ===
Date	LVV	PDK	LDK	AAK	NISMA	SL	Other	Lead
June 2025	50	28	22	0	0	10	10	22
March 2025	53	27	20	0	0	10	10	26
9 February 2025	48	24	20	8		9	11	24

== Results ==
Albin Kurti's Vetëvendosje party received 51% of the vote, translating to 57 seats. While short of the 61 seats needed to form a government, Vetëvendosje gathered support from non-Serb minority representatives as it did after the 2021 elections. The Democratic Party of Kosovo came second with 20%, maintaining a similar level of support from the last election. The Democratic League of Kosovo came in third with 13%, dropping in support from 18% earlier the same year. Turnout was estimated at 47%. With the fourth successive victory for Vetëvendosje in parliamentary elections, Kurti was sworn in for a third term as Prime Minister on 11 February 2026.

Party	Votes	%	Seats	+/–
Vetëvendosje	487,077	51.10	57	+9
Democratic Party of Kosovo	192,434	20.19	22	–2
Democratic League of Kosovo	126,163	13.24	15	–5
Alliance for the Future of Kosovo	52,423	5.50	6	+1
Serb List	42,759	4.49	9	0
Social Democratic Initiative	15,189	1.59	0	–3
Turkish Democratic Party of Kosovo	5,410	0.57	2	0
For Freedom, Justice and Survival	4,862	0.51	1	0
Vakat Coalition	3,983	0.42	1	0
New Democratic Party	3,920	0.41	1	0
New Democratic Initiative of Kosovo	2,768	0.29	1	0
Social Democratic Union	2,613	0.27	1	0
Egyptian Liberal Party	2,252	0.24	1	0
Ashkali Social Democratic Party	2,059	0.22	1	New
PAI–PDAK–LpB	1,996	0.21	0	–1
Unique Gorani Party	1,547	0.16	1	0
Progressive Movement of Kosovar Roma	1,173	0.12	1	New
United Roma Party of Kosovo	929	0.10	0	–1
Albanian Democratic National Front Party	919	0.10	0	0
Fjala	904	0.09	0	0
Citizens' Initiative for Kosovo	793	0.08	0	New
Kosovski Savez	537	0.06	0	New
Kosovar New Romani Party	227	0.02	0	0
Independent	268	0.03	0	0
Total	953,205	100.00	120	0
Valid votes	953,205	100.00		
Invalid/blank votes	0	0.00		
Total votes	953,205	100.00		
Registered voters/turnout	1,999,204	47.68		
Source: KQZ

=== By municipality or voting provision ===
Municipality	LVV		PDK		LDK		AAK		SL		Others	
Municipality	Votes	%	Votes	%	Votes	%	Votes	%	Votes	%	Votes	%
Deçan	5,747	32.47	737	4.16	2,825	15.96	8,178	46.21	1	0.01	211	1.19
Gjakova	24,637	54.63	4,204	9.32	4,455	9.88	10,084	22.36	2	0.00	1,714	3.81
Drenas	5,948	22.91	18,058	69.54	662	2.55	359	1.38	0	0.00	941	3.62
Gjilan	32,726	63.55	7,564	14.69	8,201	15.92	1,043	2.03	1,105	2.15	860	1.66
Dragash	5,258	39.17	2,321	17.29	2,551	19.00	98	0.73	64	0.48	3,132	23.33
Istog	9,845	46.45	2,138	10.09	5,890	27.79	2,023	9.54	212	1.00	1,087	5.13
Kaçanik	11,218	62.04	5,216	28.85	1,139	6.30	305	1.69	0	0.00	203	1.12
Klina	7,284	37.62	5,046	26.06	2,420	12.50	3,940	20.35	140	0.72	531	2.75
Kosovo Polje	14,182	55.23	5,114	19.91	3,517	13.70	520	2.02	313	1.22	2,034	7.92
Kamenica	10,189	63.06	2,327	14.40	1,667	10.32	733	4.54	814	5.04	428	2.64
Mitrovica	25,264	66.44	9,882	25.99	1,738	4.57	310	0.82	8	0.02	823	2.16
Leposavić	127	1.84	29	0.42	14	0.20	7	0.10	5,961	86.59	746	10.85
Lipjan	16,310	49.91	8,149	24.94	6,337	19.39	445	1.36	319	0.98	1,118	3.42
Novo Brdo	1,300	23.84	342	6.27	308	5.66	97	1.78	3,181	59.22	177	3.23
Obiliq	7,592	58.20	1,692	12.97	1,859	14.25	162	1.24	1,268	9.72	472	3.62
Rahovec	14,635	54.68	5,072	18.78	3,179	11.88	3,054	11.41	280	1.05	590	2.20
Peja	23,459	49.17	4,801	10.06	10,162	21.30	6,243	13.09	399	0.84	2,647	5.54
Podujeva	27,695	61.97	6,190	13.85	9,259	20.72	802	1.79	16	0.04	727	1.63
Pristina	65,285	53.85	22,775	18.79	26,107	21.54	4,436	3.66	237	0.20	2,390	1.96
Prizren	39,114	51.76	16,131	21.35	6,547	8.66	2,114	2.80	40	0.05	11,618	15.38
Skenderaj	3,883	17.09	17,445	76.78	584	2.57	244	1.07	116	0.51	448	1.98
Shtime	8,570	56.19	4,433	29.07	1,606	10.53	120	0.79	0	0.00	523	3.42
Štrpce	1,046	16.24	494	7.67	167	2.59	19	0.30	4,304	66.84	409	6.36
Suva Reka	17,310	50.55	6,241	18.22	6,832	19.95	2,751	8.03	0	0.00	1,112	3.25
Ferizaj	37,759	61.13	14,425	23.36	5,741	9.30	1,378	2.23	5	0.01	2,456	3.97
Viti	14,776	62.72	3,762	15.97	4,369	18.54	313	1.33	51	0.22	288	1.22
Vushtrri	23,700	62.65	8,963	23.69	2,951	7.80	425	1.12	850	2.25	939	2.49
Zubin Potok	276	7.69	143	3.98	68	1.89	16	0.45	2,911	81.09	176	4.90
Zvečan	173	4.66	68	1.83	14	0.38	4	0.11	3,298	88.75	159	4.27
Malisheva	10,608	38.48	5,063	18.37	2,729	9.90	614	2.23	1	0.00	8,552	31.02
Junik	1,099	40.52	161	5.94	618	22.79	807	29.76	0	0.00	27	0.99
Mamusha	564	19.52	177	6.13	17	0.59	139	4.81	0	0.00	1,992	68.95
Hani i Elezit	2,583	62.48	1,116	27.00	246	5.95	110	2.66	0	0.00	79	1.91
Gračanica	1,190	11.20	782	7.36	406	3.82	199	1.87	6,660	62.69	1,386	13.06
Ranilug	34	1.33	10	0.39	8	0.31	2	0.08	2,161	84.58	340	13.31
Parteš	11	0.57	1	0.05	5	0.26	0	0.00	1,714	88.95	196	10.17
Klokot	622	29.49	170	8.06	150	7.11	33	1.56	924	43.81	210	9.97
North Mitrovica	1,159	15.78	264	3.59	53	0.72	41	0.56	5,356	72.90	474	6.45
Embassy & Consulate Votes	13,899	86.74	973	6.07	762	4.76	255	1.59	0	0.00	134	0.84
Total	487,077	51.10	192,434	20.19	126,163	13.24	52,423	5.50	42,759	4.49	52,349	5.49
Including inside of municipalities: Persons with special needs, Conditional and Postal votes
Source: KQZ

== Aftermath ==
Albin Kurti, leader of Vetëvendosje, promised to constitute the Assembly and immediately form a new government once the results were certified. He called the opposition to support motions for international loan deals, which require a two-thirds majority to pass.

President Vjosa Osmani said that elected lawmakers should move swiftly to form a government and agree upon international agreements in the afternoon once results were certified. She warned that not forming institutions immediately would result in the blocking of nearly 1 billion euros in international funding, including growth funds from the EU and World Bank-backed agreements.

Bedri Hamza, the prime ministerial candidate for the PDK, expressed hope for a quick formation of institutions and support of initiatives that support the interests of Kosovo. Lumir Abdixhiku, a candidate from the LDK, also similarly stressed the country's need for functional democratic institutions.

On 29 December 2025, High Representative/Vice-president Kaja Kallas and Commissioner Marta Kos published a statement on the election calling on the incoming Assembly to ratify the Growth Plan-related agreements and for the normalisation of relations between Kosovo and Serbia. It also said it would release additional grants for Kosovo in 2026.

On 14 January 2026, the Central Election Commission (CEC) adopted a decision to recount 10% of polling stations in 28 municipalities and to conduct a full recount in 10 municipalities, following suspicions of manipulation of votes cast for candidates from various political parties. On 19 January, following the identification of significant discrepancies between the votes counted at the Municipal Counting Centers and those recounted at the Counting and Results Center, a decision was made to recount all ballot boxes in all municipalities, as the observed differences were substantial.

On 23 January, authorities announced the detention of 109 people on suspicion of falsifying election results and exerting pressure, threats and bribery, of which 68,017 ballots in Prizren alone were believed to have been affected.

The recount finished on 30 January and the results were certified by the Central Election Commission (KQZ) by 1 February.
