= Second cabinet of Albin Kurti =

Current government of Kosovo

Second Kurti cabinet
- Fifteenth cabinet of Kosovo
- 22 March 2021–11 February 2026; Acting: 23 March 2025–11 February 2026
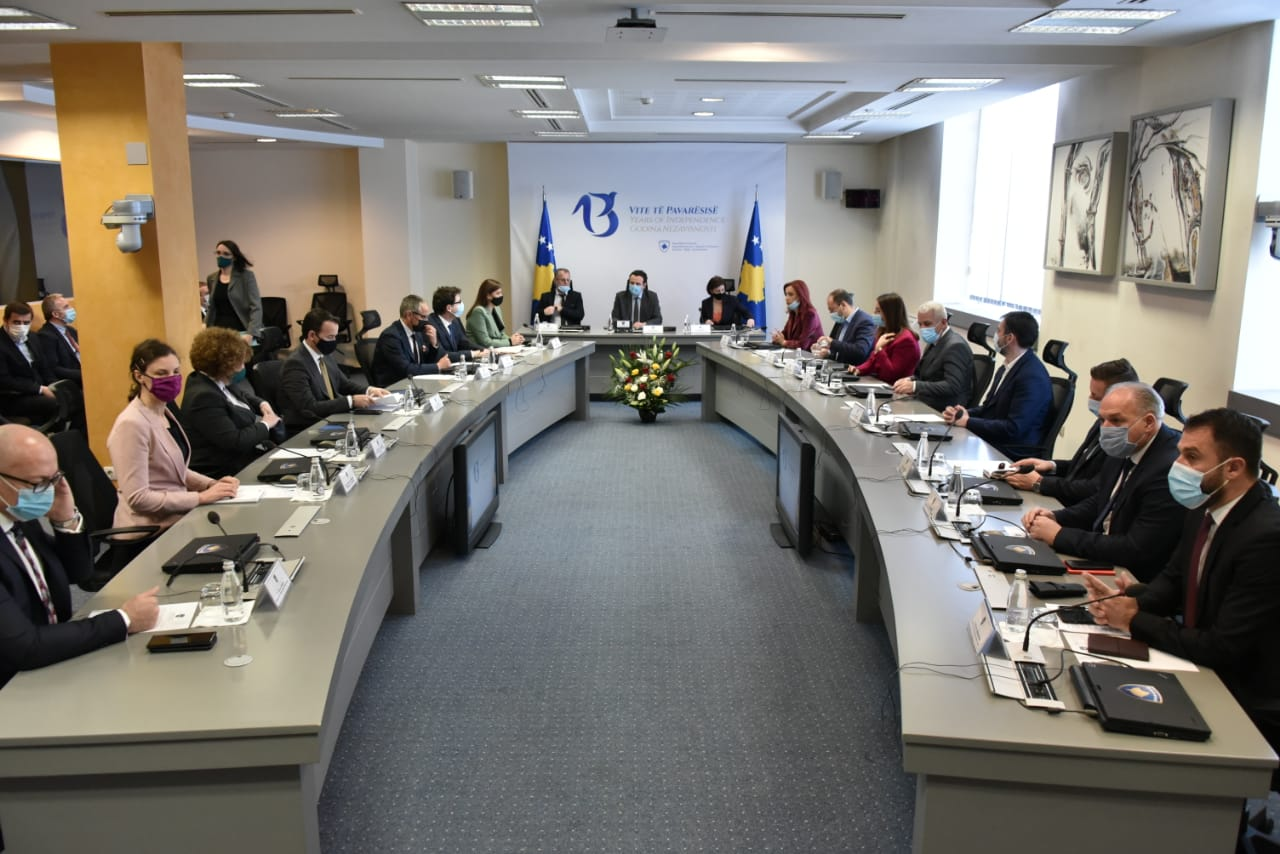
- Date formed: 22 March 2021
- Date dissolved: 11 February 2026

People and organisations
- Head of state: Glauk Konjufca (acting); Vjosa Osmani
- Head of government: Albin Kurti
- Deputy head of government: Besnik Bislimi; Donika Gërvalla-Schwarz; Emilija Redžepi
- Member parties: LVV, Guxo, PDS, IRDK, KDTP, NDS
- Status in legislature: Majority (2021–2025); Caretaker (2025–2026)
- Opposition parties: PDK, LDK, AAK, SL
- Opposition leaders: Memli Krasniqi (PDK); Lumir Abdixhiku (LDK); Ramush Haradinaj (AAK)

History
- Elections: 14 February 2021 (as caretaker from February 2025)
- Legislature term: 8th legislature of the Assembly
- Predecessor: Hoti
- Successor: Kurti III

The Second Kurti cabinet was formed in Kosovo on 22 March 2021 following a deal between the political parties Vetëvendosje, Guxo, Progressive Democratic Party, New Democratic Initiative of Kosovo, Turkish Democratic Party of Kosovo and New Democratic Party.

== Actions ==
On 22 March 2021, Albin Kurti was confirmed as Prime Minister of Kosovo by the Assembly of Kosovo after the parliamentary elections of 14 February 2021 with sixty seven pros and thirty votes against.

== Composition ==
The cabinet consists of the following ministers:

Portfolio	Minister	Took office	Left office	Party
Prime Minister of Kosovo	Albin Kurti	22 March 2021	11 February 2026	LVV
First Deputy Prime Minister for European Integration, Development and Dialogue	Besnik Bislimi	22 March 2021	11 February 2026	LVV
Second Deputy Prime Minister and Minister of Foreign Affairs	Donika Gërvalla-Schwarz	22 March 2021	11 February 2026	Guxo
Third Deputy Prime Minister for Minority Issues and Human Rights	Emilija Redžepi	22 March 2021	26 August 2025	NDS
Ministry of Agriculture, Forestry and Rural Development	Faton Peci	22 March 2021	12 December 2025	Guxo
Ministry of Agriculture, Forestry and Rural Development	Imri Demelezi (act.)	12 December 2025	11 February 2026	LVV
Minister of Communities and Returns	Goran Rakić	22 March 2021	1 December 2022	SL
Minister of Communities and Returns	Nenad Rašić	1 December 2022	11 February 2026	PDS
Minister of Culture, Youth and Sports	Hajrulla Çeku	22 March 2021	11 February 2026	LVV
Minister of Defence	Armend Mehaj	22 March 2021	8 August 2023	LVV
Minister of Defence	Ejup Maqedonci	8 August 2023	11 February 2026	LVV
Minister of Economy	Artane Rizvanolli	22 March 2021	11 February 2026	LVV
Minister of Education, Science and Technology and Innovation	Arbërie Nagavci	22 March 2021	11 February 2026	LVV
Minister of Environment, Spatial Planning and Infrastructure	Liburn Aliu	22 March 2021	27 August 2025	LVV
Minister of Environment, Spatial Planning and Infrastructure	Hysni Durmishi (act.)	27 August 2025	11 February 2026	LVV
Minister of Finance, Labour and Transfers	Hekuran Murati	22 March 2021	11 February 2026	LVV
Minister of Health	Arben Vitia	22 March 2021	1 October 2021	LVV
Minister of Health	Dafina Gexha-Bunjaku (act.)	1 October 2021	16 November 2021	LVV
Minister of Health	Rifat Latifi	16 November 2021	6 October 2022	Independent
Minister of Health	Dafina Gexha-Bunjaku (act.)	7 October 2022	26 December 2022	LVV
Minister of Health	Arben Vitia	26 December 2022	11 February 2026	LVV
Minister of Industry, Entrepreneurship and Trade	Rozeta Hajdari	22 March 2021	11 February 2026	LVV
Minister of Internal Affairs	Xhelal Sveçla	22 March 2021	11 February 2026	LVV
Minister of Justice	Albulena Haxhiu	22 March 2021	26 August 2025	LVV
Minister of Justice	Blerim Sallahu (act.)	27 August 2025	11 February 2026	LVV
Minister of Local Administration	Elbert Krasniqi	22 March 2021	11 February 2026	IRDK
Minister of Regional Development	Fikrim Damka	22 March 2021	11 February 2026	KDTP
