= Adrijana Hodžić =

Kosovar politician

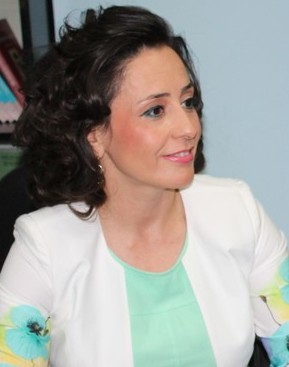

Deputy Mayor of North Mitrovica
- In office 10 December 2020 – 19 May 2023

Minister of Administration and Local Government of Kosovo
- In office 12 April 2019 – 3 February 2020
- Prime Minister: Ramush Haradinaj
- Preceded by: Ivan Todosijević
- Succeeded by: Emilija Redžepi

Personal details
- Born: 1975 (age 50–51) Titova Mitrovica, SR Serbia, SFR Yugoslavia (now Mitrovica, Kosovo)
- Party: Independent
- Other political affiliations: United Community

Adrijana Hodžić (Albanian: Adrijana Hoxhiq, Cyrillic: Адријана Хоџић; born 1975) is a Kosovar politician of Bosniak ethnicity who is currently serving as the Deputy Mayor of North Mitrovica since 10 December 2020. Prior to this she served as the Minister of Administration and Local Government of Kosovo from 12 April 2019 to 3 February 2020.

== Biography ==
Hodžić was born to a Bosniak father and an Albanian mother in 1975 in Titova Mitrovica, which at the time was part of the SAP Kosovo, SR Serbia and SFR Yugoslavia.

She gained experience in running businesses of public importance immediately after the Kosovo War, when as a regional manager in the non-governmental sector she managed projects in all Serb areas in North Kosovo, including enclaves in the south. First through humanitarian actions (providing accommodation to endangered families, distribution of food, medicine and firewood) and then through a series of economic development projects in these communities.

On 20 July 2012, Hodžić was named as the head of the newly formed Administrative Office for North Mitrovica, and has later served as the Minister of Administration and Local Government of Kosovo from 12 April 2019 to 3 March 2020 in the second cabinet of Ramush Haradinaj.

On 10 December 2020 Hodžić took over the office of the Deputy Mayor of North Mitrovica under the Mayor Milan Radojević.

Hodžić advocates for the establishment of two Bosniak municipalities in Kosovo, and she led her list called United Community at the 2021 Kosovan parliamentary elections, initially winning 6,379 votes or 0.81% of the popular vote with most of her votes coming from the ethnic Serbs. However, after complaints from other Bosniak candidates about the irregularity of the vote, Election Complaints and Appeals Panel (PZAP in Albanian) decided to annul 4,205 votes from Serb-majority municipalities. This meant that her party did not receive enough votes to enter the parliament, instead her seat went to Duda Balje (SDU). This decision was later confirmed by the Supreme Court of Kosovo, with Hodžić declaring that the court had “stolen the votes of citizens”.
