= Progressive Movement of Kosovar Roma =

Kosovar political party

Progressive Movement of Kosovar Roma Lëvizja Përparimtare e Romëve të Kosovës Kosovaki Romengi Anglipaski Phiravlin
- Leader: Erxhan Galushi
- Split from: United Roma Party of Kosovo
- Ideology: Romani minority interests
- Political position: Centre
- Assembly: 0 / 120

The Civic Initiative – Progressive Movement of Kosovar Roma (Albanian: Iniciativë Qytetare – Lëvizja Përparimtare e Romëve të Kosovës, LPRK; Romani: Dizunengi Iniciativa – Kosovaki Romengi Anglipaski Phiravlin, KRAP) is a political party in Kosovo representing the Romani community.

The party ran in the 2021 legislative elections, winning 1,208 votes, and initially failing to achieve representation in Assembly. However, the party made a complaint to the Election Complaints and Appeals Panel over the irregularity of votes received by the Romani Initiative (RI), who received a large part of their votes from Serb-majority municipalities. This complaint was partially accepted by the Election Complaints and Appeals Panel, which decided to annul 837 votes coming from the municipalities of Leposavić, Novo Brdo, Ranilug, Parteš and Klokot (later confirmed by the Supreme Court of Kosovo). This meant that RI lost a seat (from its previous two), and allowed LPRK to gain representation in the Assembly with one seat.

The party currently has a confidence and supply agreement with the LVV-led government, and the party voted for the LVV-backed candidate Vjosa Osmani in the 2021 Kosovan presidential election.

== Election results ==
Assembly of Kosovo
Year	Leader	Popular vote	% of vote	Overall seats won	RAE seats	+/–	Government
2021	Erxhan Galushi	1,208	0.14	1 / 120	1 / 4	▲1	Opposition
Feb 2025	Erxhan Galushi	Did not contest		0 / 120	0 / 4	▼1	Extra-parliamentary
Dec 2025	Erxhan Galushi	1,173	0.12	1 / 120	1 / 4	▲1	Support
2026	Erxhan Galushi	729	0.09	0 / 120	0 / 4	▼1	Extra-parliamentary
