= Confederation of Independent Trade Unions of Kosovo =

The Confederation of Independent Trade Unions of Kosovo (Albanian: Bashkimi i Sindikatave të Pavarura të Kosovës, BSPK) is a trade union federation in Kosovo.

The federation was established in 1990, and principally organised workers of Albanian heritage. By the end of the decade, it claimed to have 250,000 members, organised in 24 unions. In 1999, it president, Agim Hajrizi, was killed by the Yugoslavian authorities, and the union's records were destroyed. This led to a decline in activity, but it rebuilt, and by 2003 had 100,000 members, of whom half were unemployed. It was represented on the Kosovo Assembly, and also the Kosovo Privatisation Agency.
