= New Democratic Party (Kosovo) =

Kosovar political party

New Democratic Party Nova Demokratska Stranka Partia e Re Demokratike
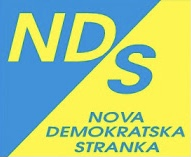
- Leader: Emilija Rexhepi
- Founder: Emilija Rexhepi
- Founded: 2009
- Headquarters: Prizren
- Ideology: Bosniak minority interests
- Political position: Centre
- Assembly: 1 / 120

Website
- nds-rks.org

The New Democratic Party (Bosnian: Nova Demokratska Stranka, Albanian: Partia e Re Demokratike) or NDS is a minority interest political party in Kosovo representing Bosniaks. It was founded by Emilija Redžepi.

The party was founded in 2009 in response to growing discontent in the Bosniak Community at the Vakat Coalition, who Redžepi accused of only working for their personal gains, instead of the needs of the community they represented.

The party first won representation in the 2010 Kosovan parliamentary election winning 2,478 vote or 0.35% of the vote. This made it the first Bosniak party, that wasn't part of the Vakat Coalition, to win representation in the Assembly. The party has maintained the same representation every election since 2010, with one seat in the Assembly.

The party did not join the “6+” parliamentary group (made up of non-Serb minority members), with Redžepi accusing the group of only serving Turkish minority interests, despite two of its members being from the Bosniak Vakat Coalition.

After the 2019 Kosovan parliamentary election, the party joined the LVV parliamentary group (along with IRDK) and was part of the LVV-LDK government, with Emilija Redžepi becoming Minister of Administration and Local Government. However, with the fall of the First Kurti government, because of a Motion of No Confidence by LDK the party became part of the opposition, along with LVV.

In 2021, the party became part of the LVV-led government, after LVV's historic victory in the 2021 Kosovan parliamentary election, with Emilija Redžepi becoming Third Deputy Prime Minister for Minority Issues and Human Rights.

== Election results ==
Assembly of Kosovo
Year	Popular vote	% of vote	Overall seats won	Bosniak seats	+/–
2010	2,478	0.35	1 / 120	1 / 3	New
2014	2,837	0.39	1 / 120	1 / 3	0
2017	3,561	0.49	1 / 120	1 / 3	0
2019	3,935	0.47	1 / 120	1 / 3	0
2021	2,885	0.33	1 / 120	1 / 3	0
Feb 2025	3,592	0.43	1 / 120	1 / 3	0
Dec 2025	3,920	0.41	1 / 120	1 / 3	0
2026	2,693	0.33	1 / 120	1 / 3	0
