= Social Democratic Union (Kosovo) =

Kosovar political party

Social Democratic Union Socijaldemokratska Unija
- Leader: Duda Balje
- Founder: Duda Balje
- Founded: 13 January 2020
- Split from: Vakat Coalition
- Headquarters: Prizren
- Ideology: Bosniak minority interests Social democracy
- Political position: Centre-left
- Assembly: 1 / 120

Party flag

Website
- sdu-ks.org

The Social Democratic Union (Bosnian: Socijaldemokratska Unija, SDU) is a minority interest political party in Kosovo representing Bosniaks. It was founded by Duda Balje, who is also the party’s only Assembly Member. Balje was a member of the Vakat Coalition in the 2019 parliamentary election, who then later moved to the LDK parliamentary group.

The party participated in the 2021 parliamentary elections and won one of the three guaranteed seats for Bosniaks in the Assembly of Kosovo with 2,549 votes.

The party ran in the 2021 parliamentary election getting 2,549 votes, initially failing to get any representation in the Assembly. However, the party made a complaint to the Election Complaints and Appeals Panel (PZAP in Albanian) over the irregularity of votes received by the Vakat Coalition and the United Community led by Adrijana Hodžić. This complaint was accepted and the Election Complaints and Appeals Panel decided to annul 4,205 votes from Serb-majority municipalities. This meant that the United Community did not receive enough votes to enter the parliament, while SDU gained representation in the Assembly winning 1 seat. This decision was later confirmed by the Supreme Court of Kosovo.

The party currently has a confidence and supply agreement with the Lëvizja Vetëvendosje (LVV)-led government, and the party voted for the LVV-backed candidate Vjosa Osmani in the 2021 Kosovan presidential election.

== Election results ==
Assembly of Kosovo
Year	Leader	Popular vote	% of vote	Overall seats won	Bosniak seats	+/–	Government
2021	Duda Balje	2,549	0.29	1 / 120	1 / 3	▲1	Opposition
Feb 2025	Duda Balje	2,514	0.30	1 / 120	1 / 3	0	Snap election
Dec 2025	Duda Balje	2,613	0.27	1 / 120	1 / 3	0	Opposition
2026	Duda Balje	2,682	0.33	1 / 120	1 / 3	0	TBA
