= 2025 Kosovan parliamentary election =

2025 Kosovan parliamentary election may refer to:

- February 2025 Kosovan parliamentary election
- December 2025 Kosovan parliamentary election
