= 2021 Kosovan presidential election =

- 3–4 April 2021
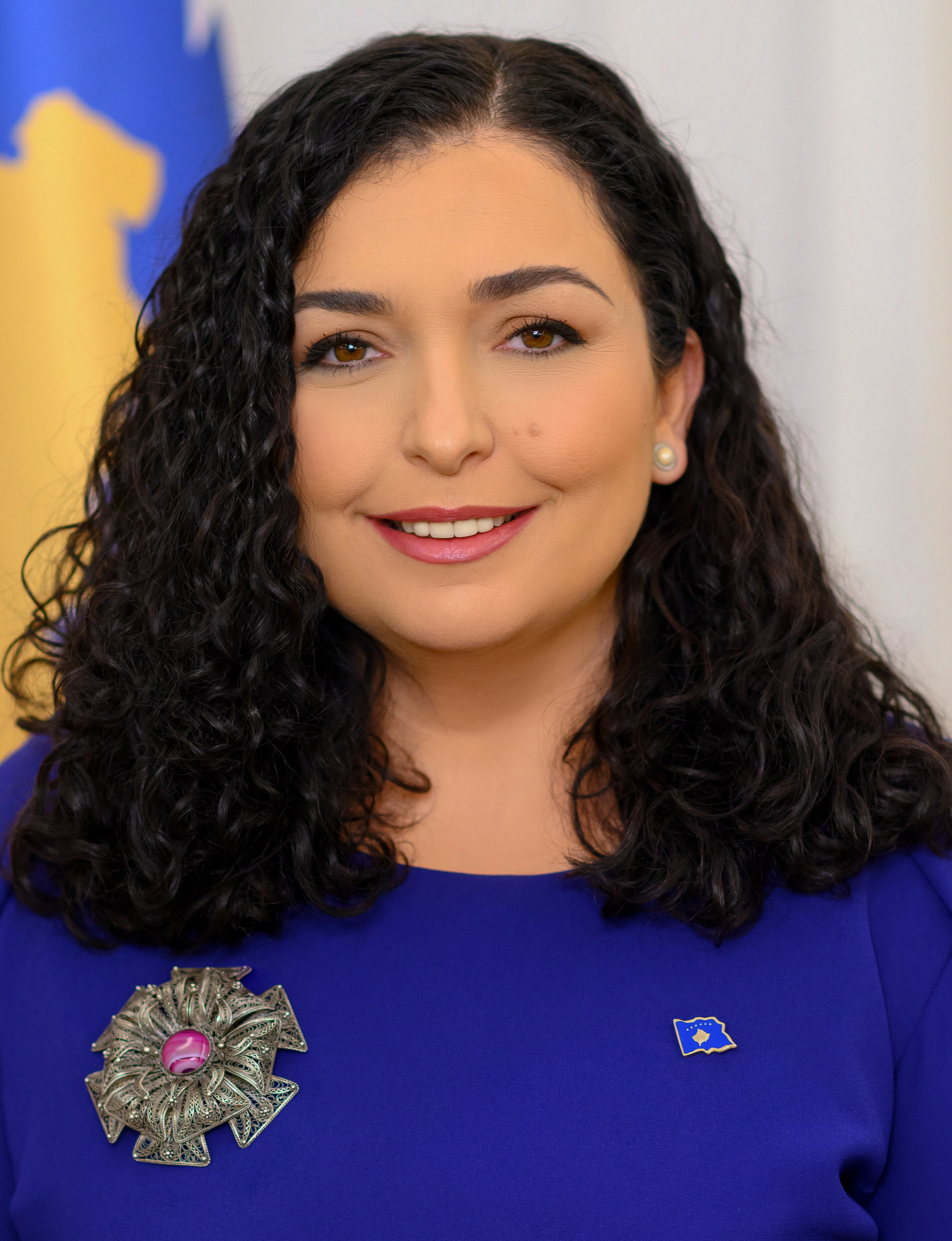

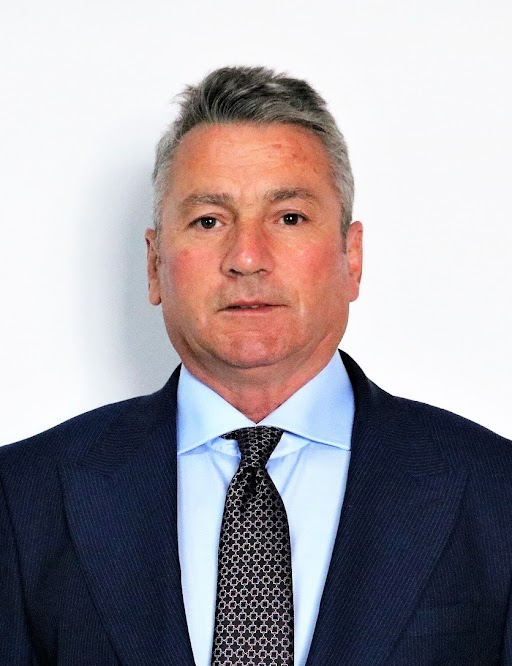
| Nominee | Vjosa Osmani | Nasuf Bejta |
| Party | Guxo | Guxo |
| Electoral vote | 69, 67, 71 | 0, 4, 0 |
President before election
Glauk Konjufca (acting)
Vetëvendosje
Elected President
Vjosa Osmani
Guxo

The parliament of Kosovo held indirect elections for president of Kosovo on 3 and 4 April 2021. The elections successfully concluded after three rounds, with Vjosa Osmani winning 71 votes out of a total possible 120. Three political parties boycotted the vote. Nasuf Bejta, also a member of Guxo, the political party Osmani founded, was the only other candidate who received a vote during any of the other rounds.

The constitution states that the presidential election must be held on or before 30 days prior to the end of the current president's term. This is the fifth presidential election in Kosovo since 2008, when Kosovo declared its independence.

== Background ==
Hashim Thaçi took office as president on 7 April 2016, but resigned on 5 November 2020 after the Hague-based Specialist Chambers confirmed a war crime indictment against him. Thaçi had been eligible for re-election for a second and final five-year term in 2021. Speaker of the Assembly Vjosa Osmani replaced Thaçi in an acting capacity.

== Electoral system ==
Initially, a candidate is required to receive at least 80 votes, equivalent to two-thirds of the 120 members of the Assembly, in order to be elected. However, if no candidate succeeds during the first two rounds, a third round is held between the top two candidates of the second round, and the requirement is reduced to a simple majority of 61 votes. If the third round also does not produce a successful candidate, the Assembly is dissolved, with new elections to take place within 45 days.

== Candidates ==
=== Confirmed ===
- Vjosa Osmani
- Nasuf Bejta

=== Potential ===
- Nehat Idrizi
- Murat Jashari
- Veton Surroi
- Fatmir Sejdiu
- Ramadan Zejnullahu
- Vlora Çitaku
- Muhamedin Kullashi
- Enver Hoxhaj
- Vjosa Dobruna
- Behgjet Pacolli
- Jusuf Buxhovi
- Rexhep Ismajli
- Nexhat Daci
- Avni Spahiu
- Edita Tahiri
- Ferid Agani

=== Declined ===
- Ramush Haradinaj
- Hashim Thaçi
- Lutfi Haziri
- Rexhep Qosja
- Isa Mustafa
- Fatmir Limaj
- Albin Kurti

== Opinion polls ==
| Pollster | Date | Nehat Idrizi | Veton Surroi | Vjosa Osmani | Murat Jashari | Isa Mustafa | Vlora Çitaku | Ramush Haradinaj | Albin Kurti | Avdullah Hoti | Enver Hoxhaj | Other candidates | Undecided | Abstention | Lead |
|---|---|---|---|---|---|---|---|---|---|---|---|---|---|---|---|
| UBO Consulting | 11 March 2021 | – | – | 48% | 3% | 2% | 5% | 11% | 6% | 2% | 4% | 9% | 9% | – | 37% |
| PIPOS | 22 January 2021 | – | – | 42% | 20.3% | 3% | 16.5% | 8.7% | – | – | – | 9.6% | – | – | 21.7% |
| Riinvest Data Analytics | 19 January 2021 | – | – | 57.18% | – | 2.89% | – | 11% | 7.12% | – | – | 6.21% | – | 6.73% | 46.18% |
| PIPOS | 15 January 2021 | 0.1% | 1% | 40.1% | 18.5% | 6% | 14.5% | 7.6% | – | – | – | 6.9% | – | 5.3% | 21.6% |

== Results ==
First rounds

The first round of voting took place on the evening of 3 April 2021. In total, 82 Members of Parliament attended the parliamentary session, thus meeting the necessary quorum for the election to take place. However, when the voting concluded it was established that only 78 MPs had submitted a ballot, thereby failing to produce a quorum for the results to be valid. The first round was therefore repeated, but only 79 MPs ultimately cast their ballots, thus once more not producing a quorum. Thereafter, the MPs left the parliamentary chamber and an announcement followed shortly which stated that the voting would continue on the afternoon of 4 April.

The third attempt of holding the first round took place on 4 April 2021. In all, 81 MPs cast their ballots and the quorum was thus finally reached. Of the 81 votes, 69 went to Vjosa Osmani, while 12 were invalid. Nasuf Bejta did not receive any votes.

Second round

The second round was held on 4 April 2021. The number of MPs who cast their ballots was 82, satisfying the quorum for validity. Vjosa Osmani received 67 votes and Nasuf Bejta received 4 votes. 11 votes were invalid.

Third round

| Candidate | Party | First round (1st attempt) | | First round (2nd attempt) | | First round (3rd attempt) | | Second round | | Third round | |
| Candidate | Party | Votes | % | Votes | % | Votes | % | Votes | % | Votes | % |
|---|---|---|---|---|---|---|---|---|---|---|---|
| Vjosa Osmani | Guxo | No quorum | | No quorum | | 69 | 100 | 67 | 94.37 | 71 | 100 |
| Nasuf Bejta | Guxo | No quorum | | No quorum | | 0 | 0.00 | 4 | 5.63 | 0 | 0.00 |
| Invalid/blank votes | | No quorum | | No quorum | | 12 | – | 11 | – | 11 | – |
| Total | | 78 | 100 | 79 | 100 | 81 | 100 | 82 | 100 | 82 | 100 |
| Registered voters/turnout | | 120 | 65.00 | 120 | 65.83 | 120 | 67.50 | 120 | 68.33 | 120 | 68.33 |
Source: Exit, Kosova Press, Kosova Press

== See also ==
- Politics of Kosovo
