= Unique Gorani Party =

Kosovar political party

Unique Gorani Party Jedinstvena goranska partija Partia unike gorane
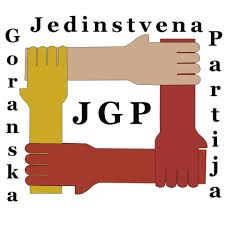
- Leader: Adem Hodža
- Founder: Adem Hodža
- Founded: May 2014
- Headquarters: Restelicë, Dragash
- Ideology: Gorani minority politics
- Assembly of Kosovo: 1 / 120

Website
- jedinstvenagoranskapartija.com

The Unique Gorani Party (Serbian: Јединствена Горанска Партија, Jedinstvena goranska partija, Albanian: Partia unike gorane) is a Gorani political party in Kosovo.

== History ==
The Unique Gorani Party was registered by the Kosovo Electoral Commission on 12 May 2014.

== Representation ==
Since its founding the Unique Gorani Party has won a Gorani Minority reserved seat in the Assembly of the Republic of Kosovo twice in Kosovo Parliamentary Elections of 2017 and 2019. The Unique Gorani Party is part of Parliamentary Majority in the Assembly of the Republic of Kosovo and is represented in the Government of Kosovo with one Deputy Minister. At the local government level, taking part in the municipal elections in Municipality of Dragaš, the Unique Gorani Party has won 2 out of 27 seats of the local Assembly.

== Election results ==
=== Parliamentary elections ===
Assembly of Kosovo
Year	Leader	Popular vote	% of vote	Overall seats won	Gorani seats	Government	+/–
2017	Adem Hodža	2,369	0.33%	1 / 120	1 / 1	▲1	Opposition
2019	Adem Hodža	1,159	0.14%	1 / 120	1 / 1	0	Opposition
2021	Adem Hodža	2,162	0.25%	1 / 120	1 / 1	0	Opposition
Feb 2025	Adem Hodža	1,650	0.20%	1 / 120	1 / 1	0	Snap election
Dec 2025	Adem Hodža	1,547	0.16%	1 / 120	1 / 1	0	Opposition
2026	Adem Hodža	1,650	0.20%	1 / 120	1 / 1	0	TBA

== See also ==
- Gorani people
- Gora (region)
- Adem Hodža
- Hamza Balje
