= Lumir Abdixhiku =

Kosovar Albanian politician

- Abdixhiku in 2025

Leader of the Democratic League
- Incumbent
- Assumed office 14 March 2021
- Preceded by: Isa Mustafa

Minister of Infrastructure and Environment
- In office 3 February 2020 – 3 June 2020
- Preceded by: Pal Lekaj
- Succeeded by: Arban Abrashi

Member of the Assembly of the Republic of Kosovo
- In office 3 August 2017 – 3 February 2020

Personal details
- Born: 22 April 1983 (age 43) Pristina, SAP Kosovo, SR Serbia, SFR Yugoslavia (present-day Kosovo)
- Party: Democratic League
- Spouse: Albina Kastrati
- Children: 2
- Education: University of Pristina; Staffordshire University

Lumir Abdixhiku (born 22 April 1983) is a Kosovar Albanian politician serving as President of Democratic League of Kosovo since 14 March 2021. He previously served as Minister of Infrastructure and Environment in the 2019. He was also a Chairman of the Budget and Finance Committee in the Assembly of the Republic of Kosovo from 2017 to 2019.

== Early life and education ==
Abdixhiku was born on 22 April 1983, in Pristina, in the Socialist Autonomous Province of Kosovo, then part of the Socialist Republic of Serbia, a constituent unit of Yugoslavia. Lumir Abdixhiku finished elementary school from “Gjergj Fishta” and high school from “Xhevdet Doda”. After graduating from high school, he started his BA studies in the Faculty of Law and Economics at the University of Pristina, graduating in 2004. Abdixhiku continued his postgraduate studies in Great Britain, receiving a MSc in Economics for Business Analysis in 2006 and a PhD in 2013 from Staffordshire University. He received his PhD after four years of research in the field of ‘Determinants of Business Tax Evasion in Transition Economies’.

== Personal life ==
Abdixhiku is married and has two daughters. He has served as executive director of Riinvest Institute, one of oldest and most prestigious research institutes and think-tanks in Kosovo. He held this position from 2010 to 2017, when he resigned following his entry to politics. As head of this institute, Abdixhiku oversaw the implementation of various projects in Kosovo. Abdixhiku has been a lecturer at Riinvest College since 2007 where he has taught a range of courses in the field of economics.

Abdixhiku has been a weekly columnist in Koha Ditore from 2011 to 2017. Writing under the banner “Letters from limbo”, he has covered a broad range of issues that preoccupied Kosovan society in the aftermath of the declaration of independence, mainly criticizing what he considered rampant corruption, nepotism, gerrymandering, deep state, among others.

== Leader of LDK ==
For three consecutive elections, Abdixhiku was one of the most voted candidates for the Assembly of Kosovo. In 2020 he was nominated as Minister of Infrastructure and Transport. He also was a member of the Presidency of LDK.

Following LDK's defeat in the 2020 general election, party leader Isa Mustafa resigned and opened the way for new leadership. In the party elections held on 14 March 2021, Lumir Abdixhiku secured 191 votes out of 328 in total, becoming a new party leader. As a leader of LDK, Abdixhiku undertook several reforms and embraced a conciliatory tone that helped his party reach favorable results in the municipal elections held in 2021.

Following the poor result in the December 2025 Kosovan parliamentary election, the leader of the Democratic League of Kosovo (LDK), Lumir Abdixhiku, requested a vote of confidence from the party's Congress, assuming political responsibility for the electoral outcome. At the meeting of the LDK General Council held on 19 January 2026, it was decided that the motion of confidence regarding Chairman Abdixhiku would be put to a vote on 31 January 2026. During the Congrees held on 31 January 2026, following extensive debate among delegates, Abdixhiku secured the support of the majority. Out of 300 delegates present, 164 voted against his dismissal, while 136 voted in favor. With this result, he survived the vote of confidence and continued his mandate as leader of the LDK.

Following the Democratic League of Kosovo's disappointing performance in the 2026 Kosovan parliamentary election, even after the party entered into an alliance with former President Vjosa Osmani, 151 delegates called for an extraordinary party congress to consider a motion of no confidence against leader of LDK. The extraordinary congress has been scheduled for 30 July 2026, marking the party's second such congress in less than six months. Following the vote at the extraordinary congress on 30 July 2026, it was confirmed in the late hours that Abdixhiku had survived yet another no-confidence motion, with 170 votes against his removal, 152 in favor, and 5 abstentions.

== Municipal elections ==
In the latest municipal elections, held in October and November (runoff), LDK won in Peja and Lipjan in the first round, while flipping the capital city Pristina in the runoff and holding Kosovo Polje, Vitia, Istog, Junik and Dragash. In the first round, the popular vote of LDK was 170.177, with 205 assembly members. LDK was ranked as the first party based on general vote.

== February 2025 Parliamentary Election ==
In the February 2025 Kosovan parliamentary election, Lumir Abdixhiu ran with the Democratic League of Kosovo (LDK). The election resulted in Vetëvendosje securing the largest share of the vote with approximately 40%, while LDK received around 17% of the vote.
