= Emigration from Kosovo =

Substantial emigration from Kosovo has taken place in various phases during the second half of the 20th century. It is estimated that about a third of people born in Kosovo currently live outside Kosovo. Emigration has taken place in separate waves motivated mainly by economic reasons, but also as a result of the Kosovo War. The Kosovar diaspora is usually included in the wider Albanian diaspora with Albanians from Albania and North Macedonia.

== Emigration of Kosovans ==
=== Turkey ===
Today's Albanians of Turkey were created from three large waves of emigration at different times. The first happened while all was a part of the Ottoman Empire in 1910 when 120,000 Albanians from the Vilayet of Kosovo were deported to what would become present-day Turkey. The second was between 1926 and 1938, though agreements by Yugoslavia and Turkey, here about 400,000 emigrated to Turkey. The last one was after World War II (1953–1966) when nearly 400,000 were expelled to Turkey.

=== Western Europe ===
- Emigration elsewhere was initially as seasonal workers in Switzerland and Germany
- Another phase occurred with the dissolution of former Yugoslavia.
- Immigration took place during and after the Kosovo War (1998–1999).
- Since 2014, estimates ranging from 40,000 to 100,000 people have emigrated for economic and other reasons.

As the population of Kosovo mainly consists of Kosovar Albanians, emigrant population was of a corresponding composition, with about 90% Albanians besides smaller numbers of Kosovan Serbs, Bosniaks, Roma, Ashkali, and Balkan Egyptians, Turks et cetera.

The largest numbers of Kosovan emigrants are found in Germany (2022: 542,000), Switzerland (350,000), the U.S. and Scandinavia, making almost 800,000 Kosovar-Albanians living abroad. They are included in the Albanian diaspora.

Since 2008, the constitutional status of Kosovo is under dispute, it is recognized by some states as the Republic of Kosovo and by others as a part of the Republic of Serbia. After the creation of UNMIK, Kosovars were able to travel using specially created documents, while in 2009 the Republic of Kosovo began issuing passports. Some retain Serbian nationality which is open to all Kosovan citizens. For this reason, there is no reliable statistics of the figure of the Kosovan diaspora.

== Ministry of Diaspora ==
On 19 May 2011, the Government of Kosovo took a decision on the establishment of the Ministry of Diaspora, with a mandate to establish closer ties with compatriots, to represent their interests as well as to create opportunities for them to participate directly in decision-making processes future of the state. Ministry of Diaspora will be the node that will be linked and set guidelines for the implementation of projects that will be useful for diaspora and Kosovo. Its activity is determined by the Government Regulation. The purview of the Ministry of Diaspora:

- Develops policies and legislation in the area of its responsibility
- Develops and implement policies and projects related to the diaspora
- In cooperation with the Ministry of Finance and in accordance with the applicable legal frame in force, proposes and manages the budget of the Ministry of Diaspora
- Assists in the promotion, preservation and cultivation of cultural, educational and linguistic identity, of the diaspora members, and oversees their implementation
- In cooperation with other relevant institutions, draws the register of members of the diaspora
- Draws, implements and coordinates studies, researches, programs of the field belonging to the diaspora
- Serves as intermediary and communication between the members of the diaspora and the institutions of the Republic of Kosovo
- Implements educational programs for members of the diaspora, drawn by the responsible Ministry of Education
- Implements policies in the sphere of culture for the members of the diaspora
- Offers information, coordinates and supports investments for the members of the diaspora in Kosovo;
- Establishes and coordinates cultural centres of Kosovo for the diaspora
- In coordination and cooperation with Kosovo's cultural centres for diaspora prepares reports to the Government regarding on the state of the diaspora
- Prepares, coordinates and supervises the implementation of the strategy for the diaspora
- Collaborates and coordinates activities with other municipal and state institutions, civil society and with organizations and associations inside and outside Kosovo, to improve the position of the diaspora

== Diaspora investment in Kosovo ==
The Ministry for the Diaspora held a conference on “Attracting Diaspora investment in Kosovo”, recognizing the importance of the diaspora to the economy of Kosovo.

The Minister for the Diaspora, Mr. Ibrahim Makolli, said that the Ministry's objectives are to identify, encourage, and support investment from the diaspora.

Deputy Prime Minister and Minister of Trade and Industry (MTI), Mimoza Kusari – Lila, presented plans to attract investment from Kosovo's diaspora, directly relating to two agencies that operate under the MTI. At the press conference, she talked about the Business Registration Agency. The Agency will collaborate with Ministry for the Diaspora to open Business Registration Centres in Switzerland, Germany, the United States, and Turkey, to process business registrations outside Kosovo relating to Kosovar business owners. Many international representatives attended this meeting.

The objective of the conferences is to promote investment and inform the Kosovan diaspora of facilities for doing business, and reforms that have been implemented in Kosovo.

Business registration in Kosovo is now much easier and faster. Goods import and export procedures have been significantly reduced, a considerable number of construction licenses have been eliminated, and contract implementation has been greatly improved through laws governing enforcement procedures, notaries and the cadastre.

Among other progress, Minister Kusari – Lila also spoke about the conclusion of the investment protection agreement. Agreements have been signed with 12 countries: the United Kingdom, Hungary, Italy, the Netherlands, Croatia, Japan, the United Arab Emirates, Kuwait, Qatar, Norway, France, and Montenegro. Finally, the positive impact of improved relations with the European Union on investment promotion and growth.

Kosovo's remittances for 2010 were €511.6 million; 30% of foreign direct investment came from the diaspora.

=== Direct investments ===
Around 25% of businesses surveyed were established with partial or full support from the diaspora, through:

- Cash (42.9%)
- Joint investments (11.5%)
- Support in form of vehicles, equipment, raw materials etc. (6.5%)
- Links with companies abroad (0.7%)
- Know-how and education (3.0%)
- Professional skills (4.6%)
- 9% did not specify the type of support received
- 21.8% gave multiple answers

Only 2% of businesses were supported by International Development Agencies, and almost none were supported by national government.

=== Socio-economic development contribution ===
According to official statistics, Kosovo benefits from 450 - 500 million euros in annual revenues as a result of the diaspora. Around 30% of households in Kosovo have access to international remittances – in form of money or goods. 49% of donors live in Germany, 24% in Switzerland. Remittances made 17.5% of country's GDP in year 2000 (275 million Euros).

== Agency of Diaspora ==
The Kosovo Diaspora Agency (KDA) was established to support migrants, and is the government body responsible for diaspora members, with authority and responsibilities defined by the law. The Kosovo Diaspora Agency was founded as an Executive Agency, part of the office of the Prime Minister.

It has the following responsibilities:

- To implement the disposition of this law and other approved subsidiary laws
- To draft and propose policies for promoting the values of the diaspora and to oversee their implementation
- To coordinate the implementation of agreements with the Kosovo Cultural Centre for the diaspora
- To coordinate work in preparing the diaspora Strategic Plan and to monitor its implementation
- To cooperate with state and municipal level institutions and with civil society to improve the position of the diaspora of the Republic of Kosovo
- To improve the position of the diaspora it will cooperate with other institutions of other states with the approval of the Government of the Republic of Kosovo
- To work and assist in raising the general awareness of the diaspora of the Republic of Kosovo
- To help in promoting the cultural, linguistic and educational identity of the Republic of Kosovo in the various states where the diaspora lives
- To coordinate and cooperate with the Kosovo Cultural Centre for the Diaspora in preparing reports for the Government about the situation of the diaspora
- To report each year to the Government about the Agency's work

== Studies ==
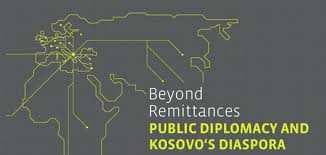
Beyond Remittances: Public Diplomacy and Kosovo's diaspora

Based on the article 'Beyond Remittances: Public Diplomacy and Kosovo's diaspora', the Kosovan diaspora is seen as source for the country's public diplomacy because it is considered that the role of Kosovo's diaspora is being a primary provider of remittances and investments in Kosovo. This was found by SDC in Forum for Democratic Initiatives, Pristina.

The Forum for Democratic Initiatives also found: Report based on the results of a survey lasted a year collaborating with the University of Neuchâtel, Switzerland, and commissioned by the Swiss agency for development and cooperation (SDC). It was found that about a third of Kosovar families are taking international shipments, which are mainly used for consumption and luxury goods. Diaspora fund to start businesses is twelve-fold higher than that received from international development agencies. However, compared with diaspora investment expectations remain low, this is due to the focus on integration rather than on the financial support of Kosovo.

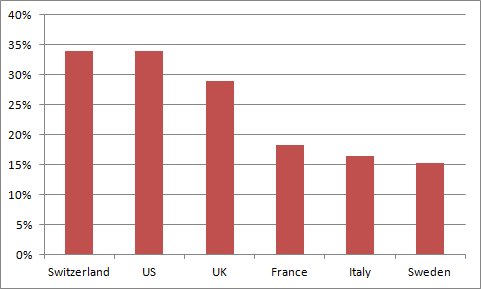
Preferences for emigration of Kosovars after Germany

Based on 'Kosovo - winning its independence but losing its people? Recent evidence on emigration intentions', the reasons of emigration that contribute in diaspora forming, vary or are linked to the population needs, thus the quality of educating, the level of conditions for work, unemployment emphasis the desire to migrate. But we should be aware that the Kosovars abroad consider the labour force with low education so works that are done from them are like building construction, public service etc.

Regarding the survey, the first preference for people of Kosovar nationality for emigration is Germany, on the list are Switzerland and the U.S. (both 34%), UK (29%), France (18.2%), Italy (16.4%) and Sweden (15.2%). Favourite places to Kosovo Serbs: Serbia (29.7%) and Switzerland (21.6%), USA, Norway, Greece, Italy, Luxembourg, Slovenia and Montenegro with a score between 4 and 6%. For both populations Switzerland is an attractive destination, reflecting previous networks refugees. (ESI) (2006). Germany is also the most important destination among Kosovo Albanians. The main reasons for emigration 52.5% of respondents emphasize unemployment in Kosovo, 25.7% a chance to increase income and 9.7% better career and growth opportunities.

At the same time, the report reflects on the fragile state of the economy, in particular the unemployment rate, which is rated at about 40%.

== Voting ==
Elections for the Assembly of Kosovo are held free, general, equal, direct and secret, in pursuance to the Law on General Elections in Kosovo and the rules of CEC. Voters are equal in exercising their right to vote. Every citizen of Kosovo has the right to vote and be chosen without any discrimination based on race, ethnic community, colour, gender, language, religion or political opinion, education, social affiliation or any other criteria.

The law on General Elections in Kosovo, among other things regulates:

- Acknowledgement and protection of the right to vote and criteria for eligibility of vote
- Maintenance of the voters’ list
- Procedures for voting, counting and announcement of results

Every person has the right to vote in the elections, in accordance with this law if he/she has reached the age of 18 in the day of elections and fulfils one of the following criteria:

- Is registered as citizen of Kosovo in the Central Civil Registry;
- Lives outside Kosovo or has left Kosovo before 1 January 1998, with the condition to fulfil the criteria according to the legislation in force for being citizen of Kosovo;
- Has won the status of refugee, set out in the Convention relating to the Status of Refugees of 28 July 1951 and its protocol of 16 December 1966, after 1 January 1995 and has the right to register in the Central Civil Registry as resident of Kosovo.

Freedom and secrecy of vote is guaranteed. No one has the right to prevent any citizen to vote, to compel to vote, to hold responsible for voting or to request, against his/her wish to reveal his/her vote or reasons for not voting.

== See also ==
- Albanians in Switzerland
- Albanians in Germany
- Albanians in New Zealand
- Albanian diaspora
