= Kallxo =

Kosovar news website

- Owner: Internews Kosova
- Creator: Faik Ispahiu
- Website: kallxo.com
- Launched: 2012; 14 years ago
- Current status: Active

Kallxo is an online platform for reporting corruption, fraud, conflict of interest, and other related cases of misuse of official position, negligence and including cases on hampering the Kosovo citizens’ rights.

Kallxo is part of the International Fact-Checking Network (IFCN) by the Poynter Institute.

== History ==
Kallxo was founded in 2012 by Faik Ispahiu as joint project of Internews Kosova, BIRN Kosovo and the Anti-Corruption Agency, supported by UNDP.
