= New Democratic Initiative of Kosovo =

Kosovar political party

New Democratic Initiative of Kosovo Iniciativa e Re Demokratike e Kosovës
- Leader: Elbert Krasniqi
- Founded: 19 July 2001; 25 years ago [date of registration]
- Headquarters: Peja, Kosovo
- Ideology: Egyptian minority interests Social democracy Third Way
- Political position: Centre to centre-left
- Assembly: 1 / 120

Website
- http://irdk-kosova.org/

The New Democratic Initiative of Kosovo (Albanian: Iniciativa e Re Demokratike e Kosovës, IRDK) is a political party in Kosovo registered on 19 July 2001. It represents the Balkan Egyptian ethnic minority. Its current leader is Elbert Krasniqi, who serves as minister of local government administration in the Republic of Kosovo's coalition government.

The party was aligned with the Alliance for the Future of Kosovo (AAK) for many years, though more recently it has been associated with Vetëvendosje (VV).

== History ==
The New Democratic Initiative of Kosovo was founded in March 2001 by Emin Sefa, Imer Alijaj, Ibish Bajrami, Bislim Hoti, Avdullah Qafani, and others. Hoti was chosen as the party's first leader.

The IRDK won two seats in the 2001 and 2004 Kosovan parliamentary elections. Its parliamentary delegates in this period were Hoti and Xhevdet Neziraj. Both served in the parliamentary group of the Alliance for the Future of Kosovo.

Neziraj succeeded Hoti as party leader in 2007. In the 2007 Kosovan parliamentary election, the party fell to one seat, which went to Neziraj. He continued to caucus with the AAK in the parliament that followed.

The IRDK was the only registered party representing Kosovo's Egyptian community until December 2010, when Hoti founded the breakaway League of Egyptians of Kosovo (LEK). In the 2010 Kosovan parliamentary election, Neziraj was elected to a fourth term, while the LEK failed to win any mandates. Neziraj once again caucused with the AAK after the election. Hoti, for his part, rejoined the IRDK in 2013.

The IRDK lost support to the newly formed Egyptian Liberal Party (PLE) in the 2014 parliamentary election and for the first time in its history fell below the electoral threshold for assembly representation. It remained below the threshold in the 2017 parliamentary election. Elbert Krasniqi succeeded Neziraj as party leader in 2017.

The party won a single mandate in the 2019 parliamentary election, which went to Krasniqi. In November 2019, he joined the parliamentary group of Vetëvendosje. He was re-elected in the 2021 parliamentary election, in which Vetëvendosje won a landslide victory, and was afterward appointed as a minister in the Republic of Kosovo's coalition government. His assembly seat went to the second-ranked candidate on the IRDK's electoral list, Fridon Lala, who served with the Multiethnic assembly group.

== Election results ==
Note: Of the four assembly seats reserved for the Roma, Ashkali, and Egyptian communities, one seat is specifically reserved for the Roma, one for the Ashkali, and one for the Egyptian community. The fourth seat is assigned to the community with the highest overall votes.

Assembly of Kosovo
Year	Popular vote	% of vote	Overall seats won	RAE seats	+/–	Government
2001	3,976	0.50	2 / 120	2 / 4	New	Opposition
2004	2,658	0.39	2 / 120	2 / 4	0	Opposition
2007	2,121	0.37	1 / 120	1 / 4	▼1	Opposition
2010	1,690	0.24	1 / 120	1 / 4	0	Opposition
2014	1,456	0.20	0 / 120	0 / 4	▼1	Extra-parliamentary
2017	1,520	0.21	0 / 120	0 / 4	0	Extra-parliamentary
2019	1,755	0.21	1 / 120	1 / 4	▲1	Government support
2021	3,305	0.38	1 / 120	1 / 4	0	Coalition
Feb 2025	4,073	0.49	1 / 120	1 / 4	0	Snap election
Dec 2025	2,768	0.29	1 / 120	1 / 4	0	Coalition
2026	3,492	0.43	1 / 120	1 / 4	0	TBA
