= Egyptian Liberal Party =

Egyptian Liberal Party Partia Liberale Egjiptiane
- Abbreviation: PLE
- Leader: Veton Berisha
- Ideology: Balkan Egyptian minority interests; Liberalism; Pro-Europeanism
- Political position: Centre to centre-left
- Assembly: 1 / 120

The Egyptian Liberal Party (Albanian: Partia Liberale Egjiptiane, PLE) is a political party in Kosovo, representing the Balkan Egyptian minority. The party won the reserved seat for the Balkan Egyptian minority in the 2014 Kosovan parliamentary election, having obtained 1,960 votes (0.27% of the total votes in the election). PLE maintained the same representation in parliament until the 2021 election, during which it lost its sole seat. PLE was represented in the Assembly of Kosovo by Veton Berisha.

In terms of matters related to the European Union, the party supports Kosovo's membership.

== Election results ==
Note: Of the four assembly seats reserved for the Roma, Ashkali, and Egyptian communities, one seat is specifically reserved for the Roma, one for the Ashkali, and one for the Egyptian community. The fourth seat is assigned to the community with the highest overall votes.

Assembly of Kosovo
Year	Popular vote	% of vote	Overall seats won	RAE seats	+/–	Government
2014	1,960	0.27	1 / 120	1 / 4	New	Opposition
2017	2,415	0.33	1 / 120	1 / 4	0	Opposition
2019	4,887	0.58	1 / 120	1 / 4	0	Opposition
2021	2,430	0.28	0 / 120	0 / 4	▼1	Extra-parliamentary
Feb 2025	3,251	0.35	1 / 120	1 / 4	▲1	Snap election
Dec 2025	2,252	0.24	1 / 120	1 / 4	0	Support (Kurti III)
2026	2,199	0.27	1 / 120	1 / 4	0	Government de jure (Kurti IV) (Note: The PLE have technically been upgraded from their support role in Kurti III but do not have any ministers as other members of the ethnic parties do, so are de facto still in a support role)
