= Elbert Krasniqi =

Kosovar politician

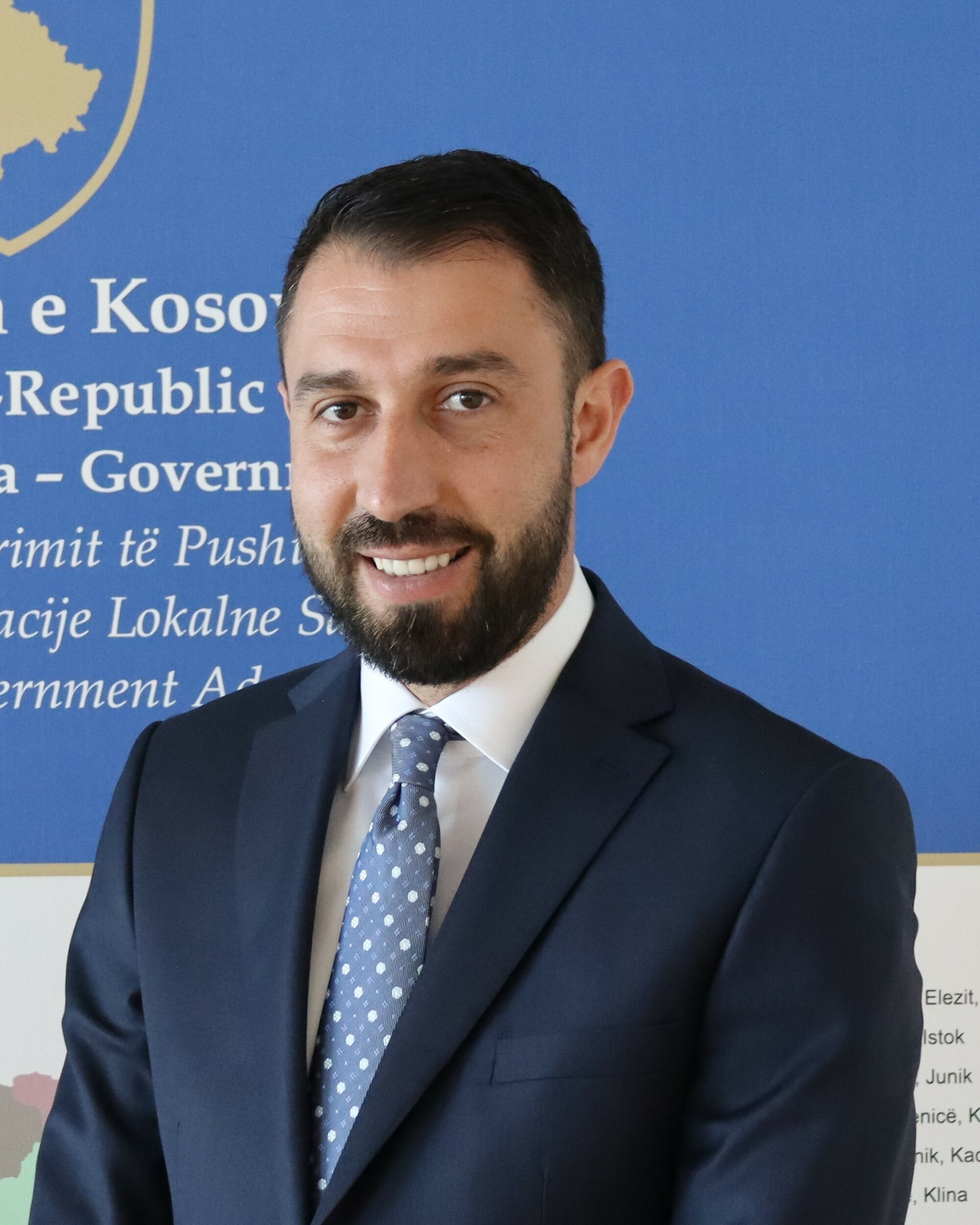
- Official portrait (2021)

Minister of Local Government Administration
- Incumbent
- Assumed office 22 March 2021
- President: Glauk Konjufca (acting); Vjosa Osmani; Albulena Haxhiu (acting)
- Prime Minister: Albin Kurti
- Deputy: Arbër Vokrri
- Preceded by: Goran Rakić

Personal details
- Born: 22 September 1986 (age 39) Peja, SAP Kosovo, Yugoslavia
- Party: New Democratic Initiative of Kosovo

Elbert Krasniqi (born 22 September 1986) is a Kosovar politician and leader of the Kosovo–Egyptian community, who is currently serving as minister of local government administration and leader of the New Democratic Initiative of Kosovo. Prior to his position, Krasniqi was a member of parliament.

== Early life and career ==
Krasniqi was born and raised in Peja, SAP Kosovo, Yugoslavia (now Kosovo), where he completed his primary and secondary education. He graduated from the Faculty of Law of the University of Pristina and obtained a master's degree in diplomacy in Skopje.

He became involved in community and local government affairs as early as 2007, promoting and implementing regional and international projects. He worked with the Italian Associazione Trentino con i Balcani, serving as legal representative and office director for Kosovo and the Balkans. In 2011, he was selected as a delegate of the Agency for Local Democracy in Kosovo, part of the network of the Association of Local Democracy Agencies – ALDA Europe.

== Politics ==
Nominated by IRDK, Krasniqi won a seat in the municipal assembly of Peja and served as the body's deputy chairman from 2014 to 2016. Krasniqi also served as a president of the Balkan Network for Local Democracy from 2018 to 2019.

A longstanding activist of IRDK, Krasniqi was elected president of the party in 2017. In the 2019 parliamentary election, he won a seat reserved for the Egyptian community. He caucused with the Vetëvendosje Movement, and served on the Committee on Economy, Employment, Trade, Industry, Entrepreneurship and Strategic Investments. As a representative of the Egyptian community, Krasniqi has criticized Serbia's efforts to undermine Kosovar elections and usurp seats reserved for non-Serb minorities.

Reelected to parliament in the 2021 snap election, Krasniqi gave up his seat to serve as minister in the second Kurti government. Fridon Lala was sworn in as new member of parliament.

Krasniqi's ministerial portfolio includes legal review of municipal acts, including a high-profile plan to grant Dua Lipa's family public land for her annual Sunny Hill festival.

In 2022, Krasniqi was elected to a second term as president of IRDK.

== Personal ==
Krasniqi speaks Albanian, English, German, Italian and Serbo-Croatian. He is married and has two children.
