= Guxo =

Kosovan political party

Dare! Guxo!
- Co-leaders: Donika Gërvalla-Schwarz; Faton Peci
- Founder: Vjosa Osmani
- Founded: 5 November 2020; 5 years ago
- Registered: 14 February 2022; 4 years ago
- Split from: Democratic League of Kosovo
- Headquarters: Pristina, Kosovo
- Ideology: Liberal conservatism; Pro-Europeanism
- Political position: Centre-right
- Colours: Blue-green; Dark blue
- Slogan: E ardhmja u takon atyre që guxojnë (The future belongs to those who dare)
- Assembly: 3 / 120
- Mayors: 1 / 38
- Municipal councils: 8 / 994

Website
- partiaguxo.org

Guxo! (English: Dare!), initially called Lista Vjosa (English: Vjosa List), is a centre-right political party in Kosovo, formed on 5 November 2020 by Vjosa Osmani. In February 2022, Guxo was registered as a political party as up to that point it was a political list.

== History ==
The party presented candidates within the common list of Vetëvendosje in the 2021 Kosovan parliamentary election, and obtained seven deputies, including Vjosa Osmani. Two of its members joined the Second Kurti cabinet resulting from these elections, which caused the number of deputies from the party to fall from seven to five. After Osmani was elected President of Kosovo in April 2021, she retreated from her party leadership and her seat in parliament as, according to the Constitution of Kosovo, the president has no right to exercise any other public office or to hold any office in a political party, dropping the number of Guxo deputies to four, while Donika Gërvalla-Schwarz became head of Guxo. After Vasfije Krasniqi Goodman, a Vetëvendosje MP, resigned her position, she was replaced by Nasuf Bejta who is a Guxo member which increased the number of deputies of the party to 5.

== Leaders ==
No.	Portrait	President (Birth–Death)	Term start	Term end	Time in office
1		Vjosa Osmani (born 1982)	5 November 2020	4 April 2021	150 days
2		Donika Gërvalla-Schwarz (born 1971)	4 April 2021	Incumbent	5 years, 165 days
2		Faton Peci (born 1982)	7 September 2022	Incumbent	4 years, 9 days

== Election results ==
Year	Leader	Votes	%	Seats won	+/–	Government
2021	Vjosa Osmani	Part of Vetëvendosje list (438,335 votes, 50.3%)		7 / 120	New	Coalition
Feb 2025	Donika Gërvalla-Schwarz; Faton Peci	Part of Vetëvendosje list (396,787 votes, 42.3%)		6 / 120	▼1	Snap election
Dec 2025	Donika Gërvalla-Schwarz; Faton Peci	Part of coalition with Vetëvendosje (487,077 votes, 51.1%)		7 / 120	▲1	Coalition
2026	Donika Gërvalla-Schwarz; Faton Peci	Part of coalition with Vetëvendosje (382,869 votes, 47.1%)		3 / 120	▼4	Coalition
