= Adem Hodža =

Kosovan politician

- Адем Хоџа
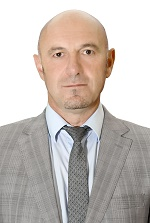

Member of the Assembly of Kosovo
- Incumbent
- Assumed office 2014

Provisional President of the Municipality of Gora
- In office 2013–2018

Personal details
- Born: 16 June 1968 (age 57) Restelica, Gora, SR Serbia, SFR Yugoslavia (now Kosovo)
- Party: Unique Gorani Party

Adem Hodža (Serbian Cyrillic: Адем Хоџа; Albanian: Adem Hoxha; born 16 June 1968) is a Kosovan politician who is currently a member of the Assembly of Kosovo. He is the president of the Unique Gorani Party, a Gorani minority political party in Kosovo.

== Biography ==
Hodža was born to a Gorani family in 1968 in Restelica, Gora which at the time was a part of the Socialist Federal Republic of Yugoslavia.

He is a president of the Unique Gorani Party, a Gorani minority political party in Kosovo and is a member of the Assembly of Kosovo. He also served as the Provisional President of the Municipality of Gora, which functions in the system of Serbia from 2013 until his removal from office in 2018 after numerous accusations against him.

He has been accused of very controversial activities on several occasions, as well as accused of attempted rape, for which he was ordered to be detained for 30 days. His decisions provoked frequent outrages among the Gorani loyal to Serbia, of which he is a representative. On several occasions, intellectuals and citizens of Gora asked the Government of Serbia for Hodža to be replaced, but this was not done until 2018. Hodža voted for the demarcation between Kosovo and Montenegro in the Assembly of Kosovo which also caused outrage in the Gorani and Kosovo Serb communities.
