= Emilija Redžepi =

Kosovan Bosniak politician

- Redžepi in 2026

Third Deputy Prime Minister of Kosovo for Minority Issues and Human Rights
- In office 22 March 2021 (Note: Caretaker since 23 March 2025) – 26 August 2025
- President: Glauk Konjufca (Acting); Vjosa Osmani
- Prime Minister: Albin Kurti
- Preceded by: Albulena Balaj-Halimaj

Minister of Administration and Local Government
- In office 3 February 2020 – 3 June 2020
- President: Hashim Thaçi
- Prime Minister: Albin Kurti
- Preceded by: Adrijana Hodžić
- Succeeded by: Goran Rakić

Member of the Assembly of the Republic of Kosovo
- In office 2014–2020
- President: Atifete Jahjaga; Hashim Thaçi
- Prime Minister: Isa Mustafa; Ramush Haradinaj

Personal details
- Born: 15 July 1973 (age 53) Prizren, SR Serbia, Yugoslavia
- Party: New Democratic Party
- Children: 1
- Occupation: Politician

Emilija Redžepi (Albanian: Emilija Rexhepi; born 15 July 1973) is a Kosovan Bosniak politician who is a member of the New Democratic Party, and serves as the Third Deputy Prime Minister of Kosovo.

== Career ==
Emilija Redžepi is a Bosniak from Kosovo. She has been critical of the lack of support for Bosniak affairs within Kosovo, speaking at a conference on the Day of Bosniak Community she supported teaching in Bosnian and upholding traditions. As well as being a Member of the Assembly of the Republic of Kosovo, where she is a member of the New Democratic Party, she has spoken of external affairs, encouraging Bosnia and Herzegovina to abandon the requirements for Kosovans to have travel visas to cross the border.

Her daughter was briefly kidnapped in 2015, which Redžepi perceived as a threat to be "careful what she is doing". In 2017, she announced her candidacy for Mayor of Prizren, which has a notable Bosniak population. This was after receiving the support of her party. She ended up receiving less than 5% of the vote. Later that year, she supported a vote of no confidence in the government coalition.
