= Duda Balje =

Kosovan politician

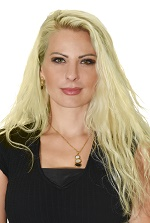

Member of the Assembly of the Republic of Kosovo
- Incumbent
- Assumed office 2001

Personal details
- Born: 16 October 1977 (age 48) Prizren, SAP Kosovo, SR Serbia, SFR Yugoslavia (now Kosovo)
- Party: SDU
- Occupation: Politician

Duda Balje (born 16 October 1977) is a Kosovar Bosniak politician. A member of the Vakat Coalition, she served as a member of the Kosovan Assembly from 2001 to 2017. She chaired the Commission on Human Rights, Gender Equality, Missing Persons and Petitions. Duda Balje has continuously stated that she is against same-sex marriages on the basis that these are her personal opinions and should be understood as such.

== Personal life ==
Balje holds a Master of Science in business economics and a Ph.D. in human resources management.

She is married and has three children.
