= Bosniaks in Kosovo =

Ethnic minority group in Kosovo

Boshnjakët në Kosovë (Albanian) Bošnjaci na Kosovu (Bosnian)
- Ethnic flag of Bosniaks in Kosovo

Total population
- 27,152 (1.7%) (2024, census)

Regions with significant populations
- Prizren · Dragash · Peja · Istog

Languages
- Bosnian; Albanian; Serbian

Religion
- Sunni Islam

Related ethnic groups
- Gorani, other South Slavs

Bosniaks in Kosovo are a South Slavic ethnic group living in Kosovo. They comprise the second largest minority group in Kosovo, after the Serbs. The vast majority of Bosniaks are adherents of Sunni Islam.

== Demographics ==
According to the 2024 national census by the Kosovo Agency of Statistics, there are 27,152 Bosniaks in Kosovo and they account for around 1.7% of the whole population. They are mostly concentrated in the municipalities of Prizren, Pejë, Dragash and Istog.

== History ==
The overwhelming majority of Bosniaks in Kosovo settled after the end of Ottoman rule in the region, mostly after the Congress of Berlin, but also after its fall during the First and Second World Wars. They consist of Slavic-speaking Muslims who largely originate from Sandžak, but also from Montenegro (Plav and Gusinje in particular), Bosnia and Herzegovina, Serbia and Croatia. The majority of them settled in Peja, Istog, Prizren and Mitrovica. Another group includes Slavic Muslims who already resided in southern Kosovo, in the areas around Prizren, Gora and Župa. The ethnonym "Bosniak" in Kosovo is used by several distinct Slavic Muslim groups which came to form the Bosniaks of Kosovo. It was adopted by these groups as a collective identifier largely after 1999. Some Slavic-speaking Muslims identify interchangeably or exclusively as Gorani.

== Politics ==
There are several Bosniak political parties in Kosovo and the oldest one is the Bosniak Party of Democratic Action of Kosovo (Bošnjačka stranka demokratske akcije Kosova).

== Current status ==
Following the end of the Kosovo War, Bosniaks faced ongoing discrimination by Albanians who associated them with Serbs. Between 1999 and 2001, 80 Bosniaks went missing, were killed or injured. Bosniaks encounter high unemployment and poor education in Kosovo due to a lack of schools conducting studies in the Bosnian language. The return of Bosniaks who escaped Kosovo during the Kosovo War has been a slow process. Many are instead opting to sell their homes to leave for Bosnia and Herzegovina and Western Europe.

The Bosnian language is recognized as a local official language in the municipalities of Dragash, Pejë and Prizren, and as a language in official use in the municipality of Istog.

The Bosniak community in Kosovo, by Constitution, has three guaranteed seats in the Assembly of Kosovo.

== Notable people ==
- Duda Balje, politician
- Emilija Redžepi, politician
- Adrijana Hodžić, politician
- Selma Skenderović, Slovene writer and poet, she was born in Kosovo

== See also ==
- Bosnia and Herzegovina–Kosovo relations
- Bosniaks
- Demographics of Kosovo
- Bosniaks in Serbia
