= Assembly of Kosovo =

National legislature of Kosovo

Coordinates: 42°39′53″N 21°09′52″E

Assembly of the Republic of Kosovo Kuvendi i Republikës së Kosovës
- 11th Legislature

Type
- Type: Unicameral

History
- Founded: 2 July 1990 (de jure) (Note: The date of establishment coincides with the date of the assembly first session.); 10 December 2001 (de facto)

Leadership
- Speaker: Albulena Haxhiu, LVV since 9 September 2026
- Deputy Speakers: Ardian Gola, LVV; Vlora Çitaku, PDK; Kujtim Shala, LDK; Tanja Vujovič, SL; Emilija Redžepi, NDS (Note: As part of the multiethnic group.)
- Parliamentary leaders: Arbërie Nagavci, LVV; Arian Tahiri, PDK; Jehona Lushaku Sadriu, LDK; Igor Simić, SL; Besnik Tahiri, AAK; Artan Asllani, PSA

Structure
- Seats: 120
- Political groups: Government (Fourth Cabinet of Albin Kurti) (62): LVV (53) (Note: LVV (49); Guxo (3); Alternativa (1)); Multiethnic group (9) (Note: KDTP (2); IRDK (1); Vakat (1); ZSPO (1); PREBK (1); NDS (1); PLE (1); PSA (1)); Opposition (58): PDK (22); LDK (18); SL (9); AAK (7); JGP (1); SDU (1)
- Committees: Various by legislature, currently 16
- Length of term: Four years
- Salary: €1,547 monthly

Elections
- Voting system: Open party-list proportional representation
- First election: 24 May 1992 (de jure); 17 November 2001 (de facto)
- Last election: 7 June 2026
- Next election: On or before 7 July 2030

Meeting place
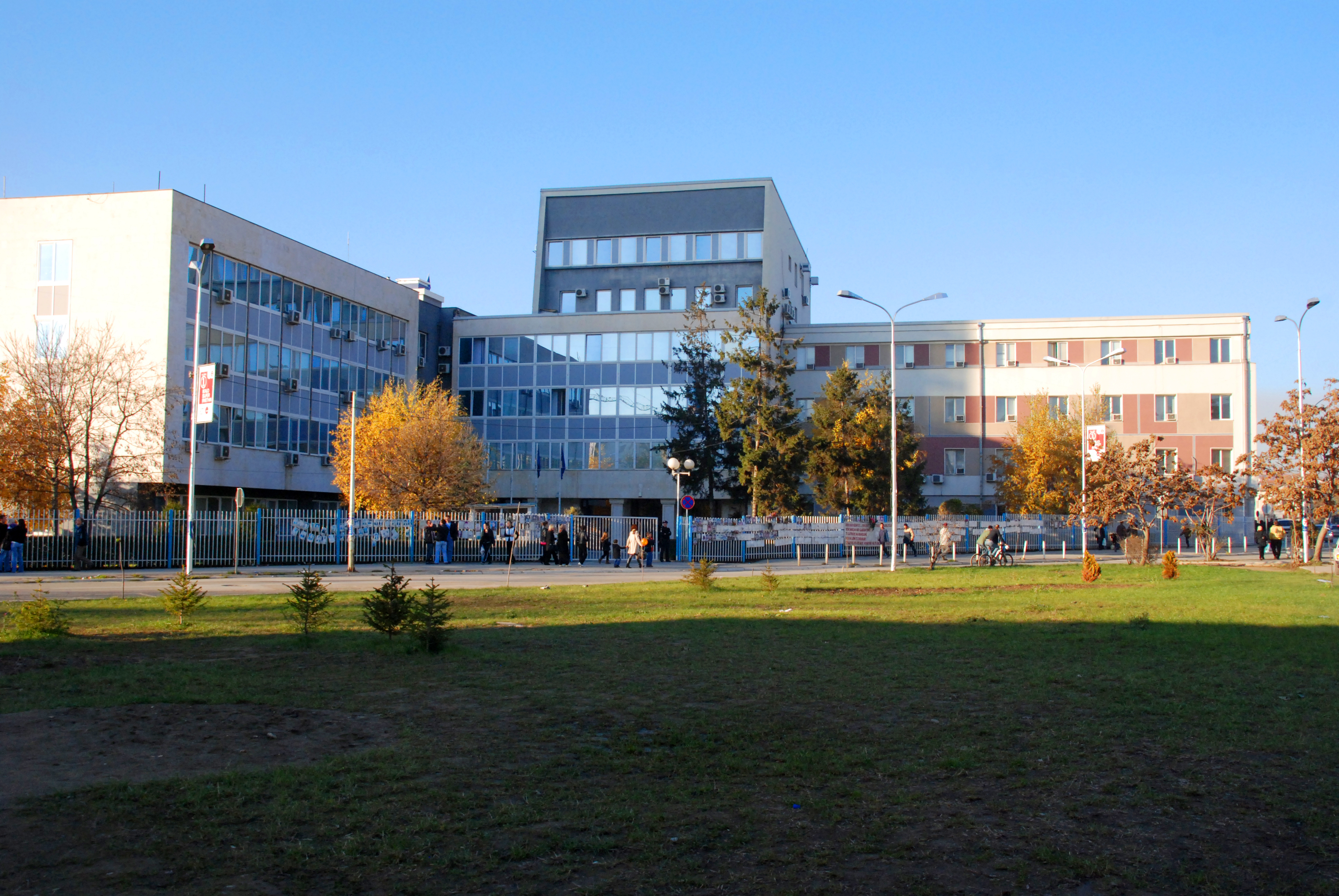
- Assembly Building, Ibrahim Rugova Square, Pristina, Kosovo

Website
- www.kuvendikosoves.org

The Assembly of the Republic of Kosovo (Albanian: Kuvendi i Republikës së Kosovës; Serbian: Скупштина Републике Косово, Skupština Republike Kosovo), also known as the Kuvendi, (Note: Albanian for Assembly) is the unicameral legislature of the Republic of Kosovo. It is directly elected by the people every four years. It was originally established by the United Nations Interim Administration Mission in Kosovo in 2001 to provide 'provisional, democratic self-government'. On 17 February 2008, representatives of the people of Kosovo unilaterally declared Kosovo's independence and subsequently adopted the Constitution of Kosovo, which came into effect on 15 June 2008.

== Members ==
The Assembly of the Republic of Kosovo is regulated by the Constitution of Kosovo and has 120 directly elected members; 20 are reserved for national minorities as follows:

- 10 seats for the representatives of the Serbs.
- 4 seats for the representatives of the Romani, Ashkali and Egyptians.
- 3 seats for the Bosniaks.
- 2 seats for the Turks.
- 1 seat for the Gorans.

Albanian is the official language of the majority, but all languages of minorities such as Serbian, Turkish and Bosnian are used, with simultaneous interpretation.

== Committees ==
The Assembly of the Republic of Kosovo in this legislature has a total of sixteen committees, the number of committees varies depending on the legislature.

1. Committee for Administration and Digitalization
2. Committee for Budget
3. Committee for Culture, Tourism and Sports
4. Committee for Economy, Industry, Entrepreneurship, Trade and Innovation
5. Committee for Education
6. Committee for Environment, Food, Agriculture, Forestry, Rural Development and Infrastructure
7. Committee for European Integration
8. Committee for Foreign Affairs and Diaspora
9. Committee for Health
10. Committee for Human rights
11. Committee for Intelligence Agency Oversight
12. Committee for Legislation
13. Committee for Public Finance Oversight
14. Committee for the Rights and Interests of Communities and Returns
15. Committee for Security and Defense
16. Committee for Social Welfare, Victims of Wartime Sexual Violence and Missing Persons

== Most recent election results ==
Vetëvendosje finished first in the parliamentary elections, securing its fifth consecutive victory and remaining the largest party by a significant margin. However, the party lost support compared to the December 2025 election, while opposition parties made gains. With the backing of nine minority representatives, Vetëvendosje subsequently formed the Fourth cabinet of Albin Kurti. Voter turnout was 37.03%, the lowest recorded in Kosovo’s electoral history, reflecting widespread political fatigue and frustration with repeated elections and ongoing political instability.

Party	Votes	%	Seats	+/–
Vetëvendosje	382,869	47.13	53	–4
Democratic Party of Kosovo	157,892	19.44	22	0
Democratic League of Kosovo	135,567	16.69	18	+3
Alliance for the Future of Kosovo	54,729	6.74	7	+1
Serb List	43,843	5.40	9	0
Turkish Democratic Party of Kosovo	5,709	0.70	2	0
For Freedom, Justice and Survival	5,447	0.67	1	0
Vakat Coalition	3,910	0.48	1	0
New Democratic Initiative of Kosovo	3,492	0.43	1	0
New Democratic Party	2,693	0.33	1	0
Social Democratic Union	2,682	0.33	1	0
Ashkali Social Democratic Party	2,598	0.32	1	0
Egyptian Liberal Party	2,199	0.27	1	0
Social Democratic Party of Kosovo	2,084	0.26	0	New
Ashkalitë e Bashkuar	1,795	0.22	0	New
Unique Gorani Party	1,650	0.20	1	0
Fjala	929	0.11	0	0
United Roma Party of Kosovo	905	0.11	1	+1
Progressive Movement of Kosovar Roma	729	0.09	0	–1
Kosovar New Romani Party	355	0.04	0	0
Independent	268	0.03	0	0
Total	812,345	100.00	120	0
Valid votes	812,345	100.00		
Invalid/blank votes	0	0.00		
Total votes	812,345	100.00		
Registered voters/turnout	1,959,962	41.45		
Source: KQZ

== Assembly building ==
The Assembly Building is located at Ibrahim Rugova Square in Pristina, the capital city of Kosovo. The building, which dates from the 1950s, underwent an extensive refurbishment in 2004 which included the complete redesign of the plenary chamber.

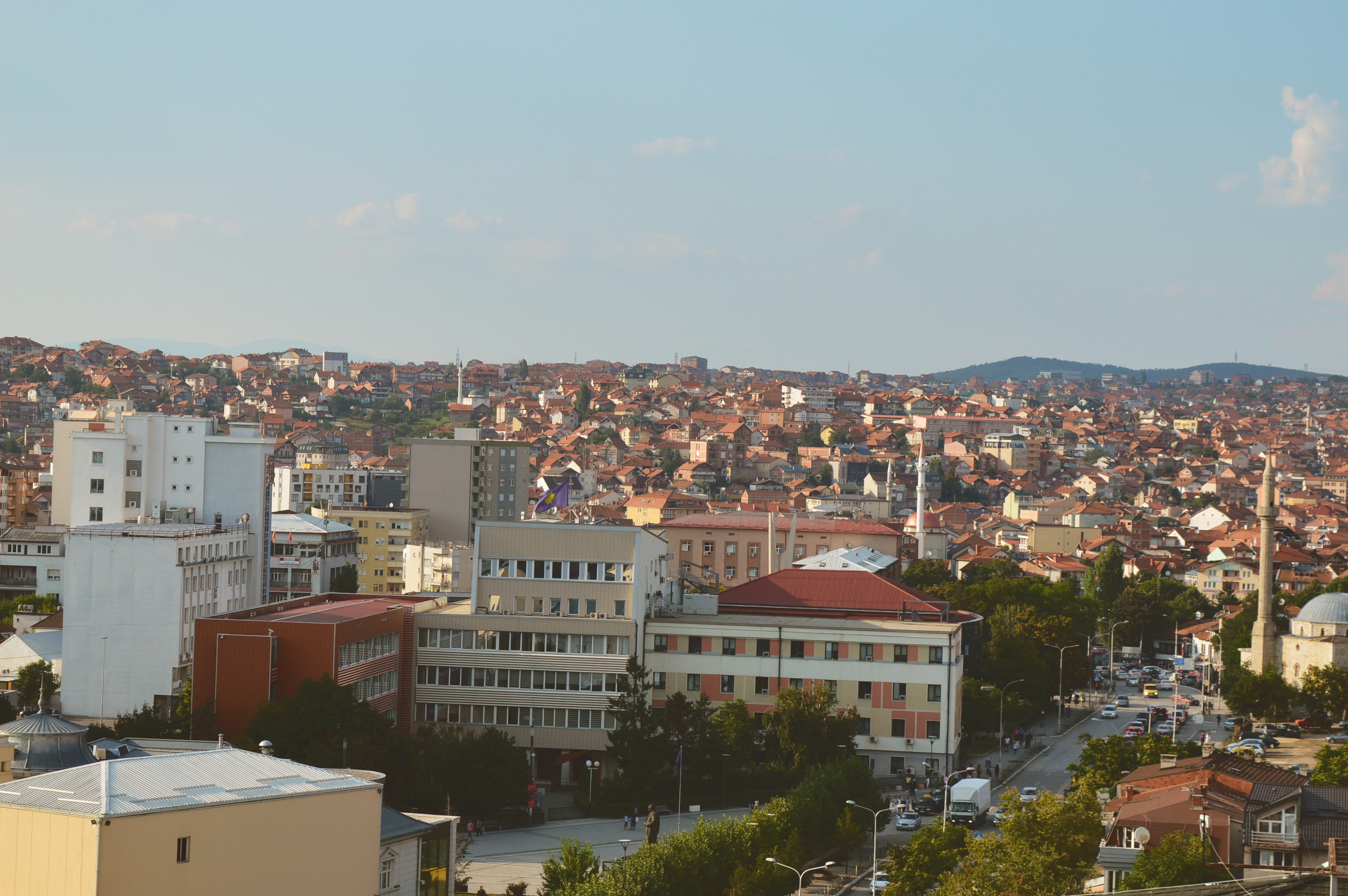
Assembly Building

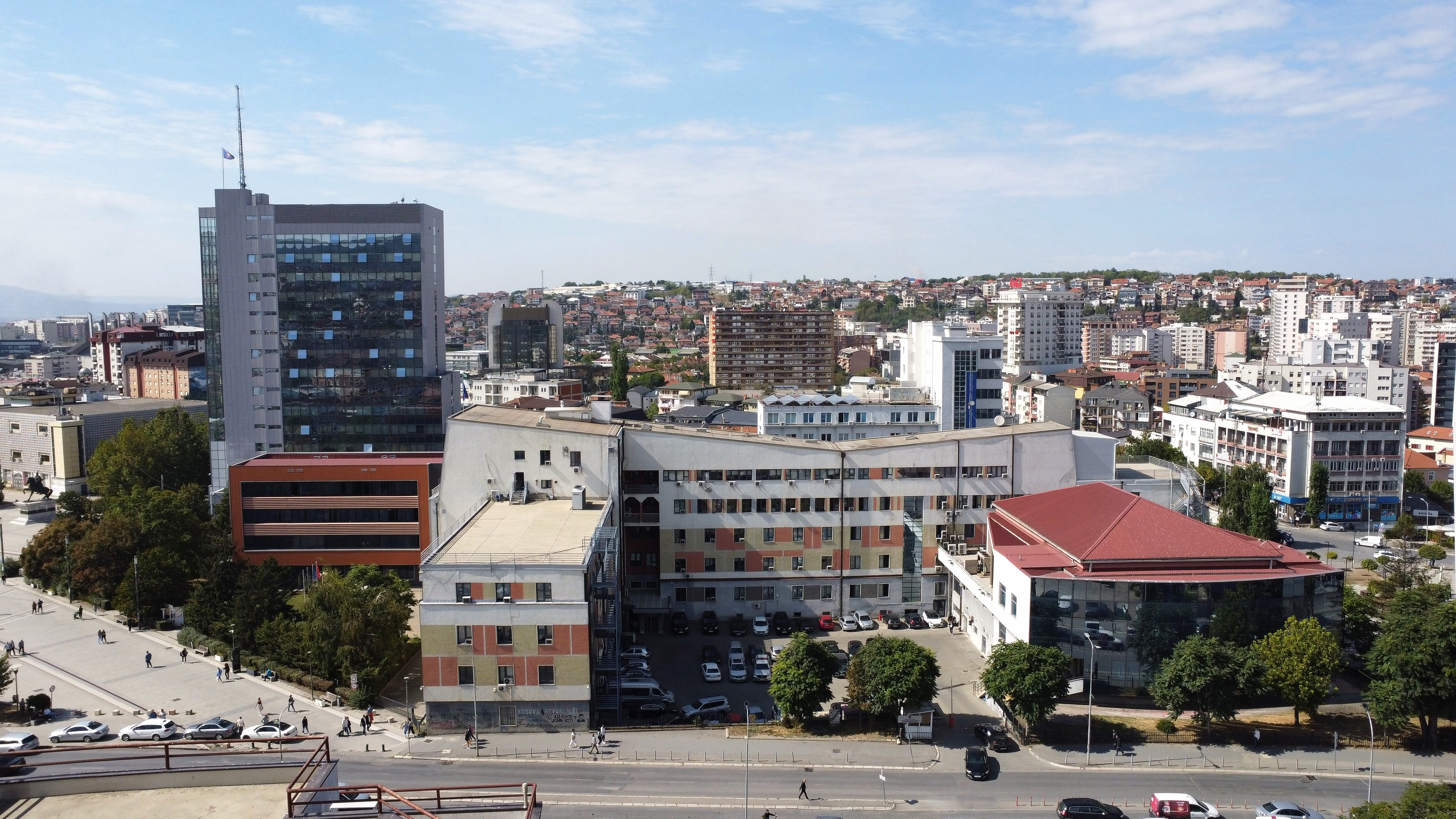
Assembly Building

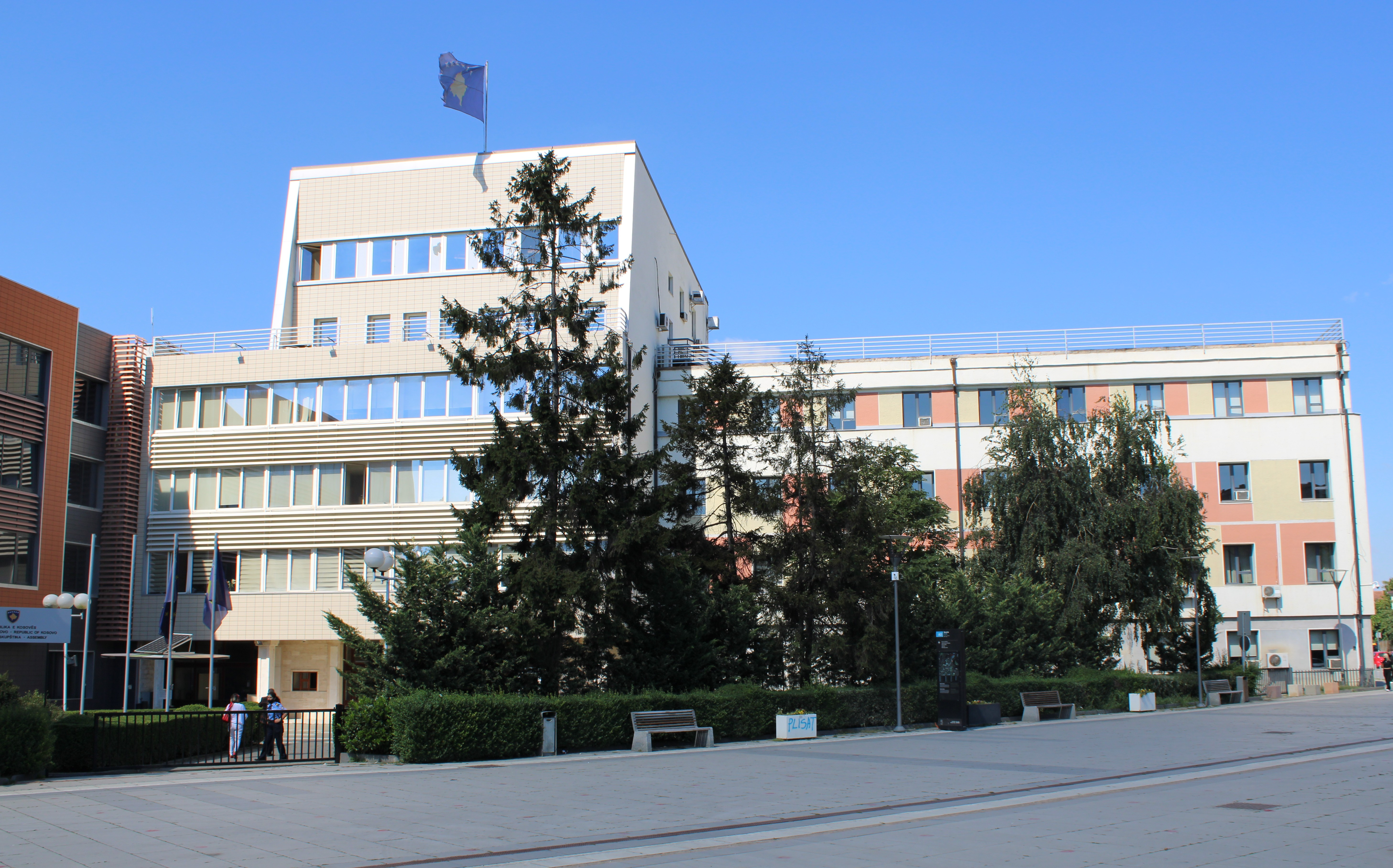
Assembly Building

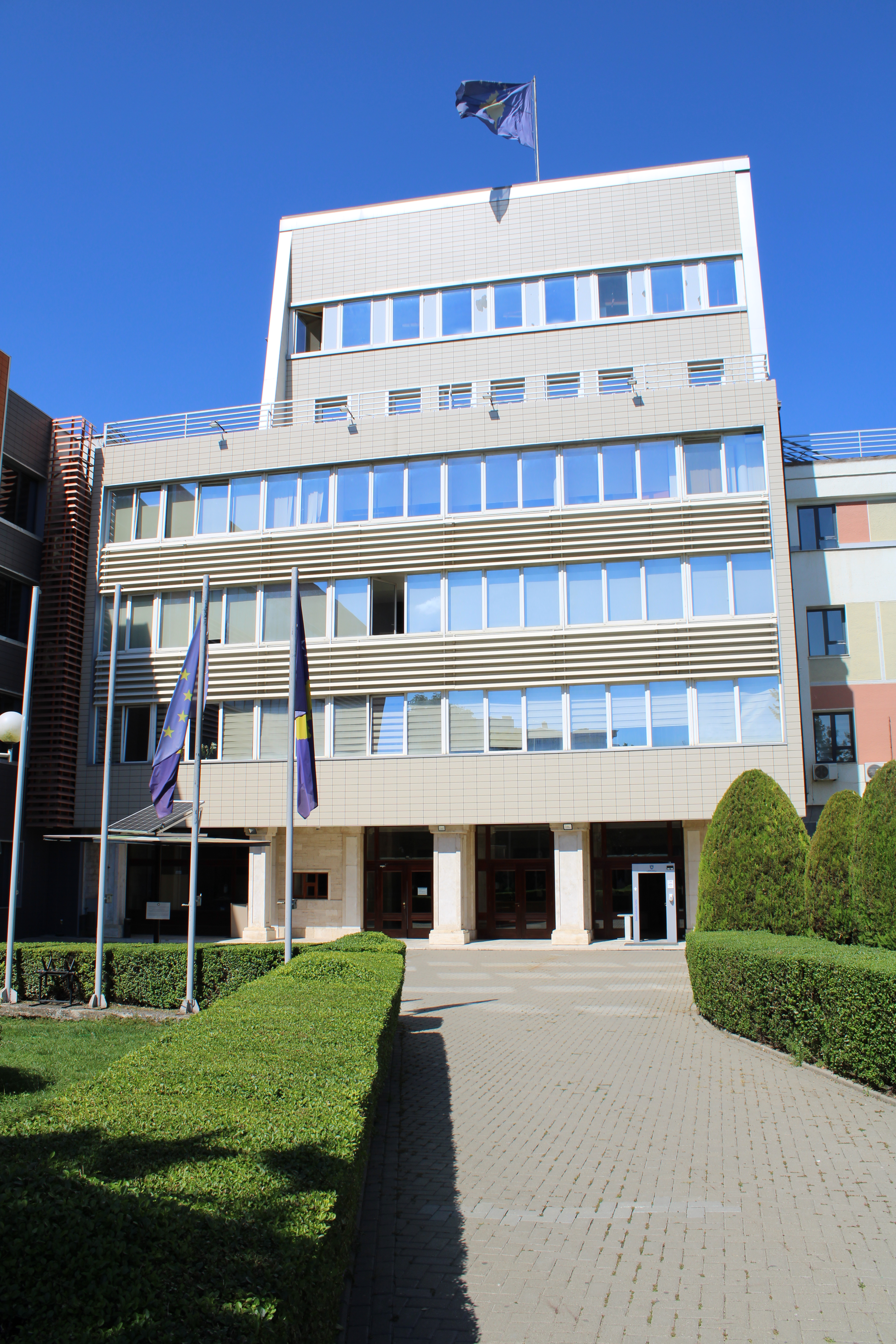
Assembly Building

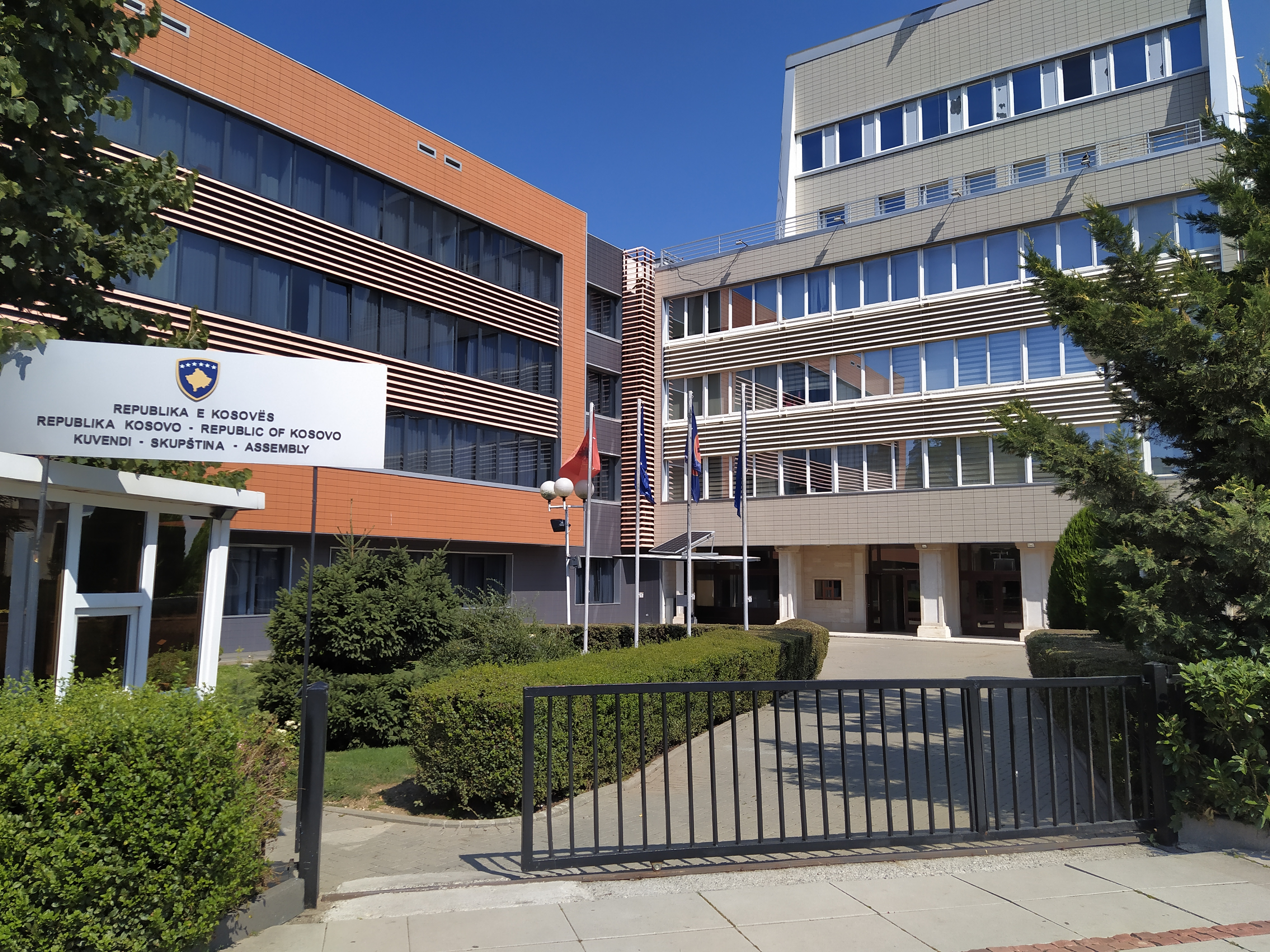
Main entrance on Ibrahim Rugova Square

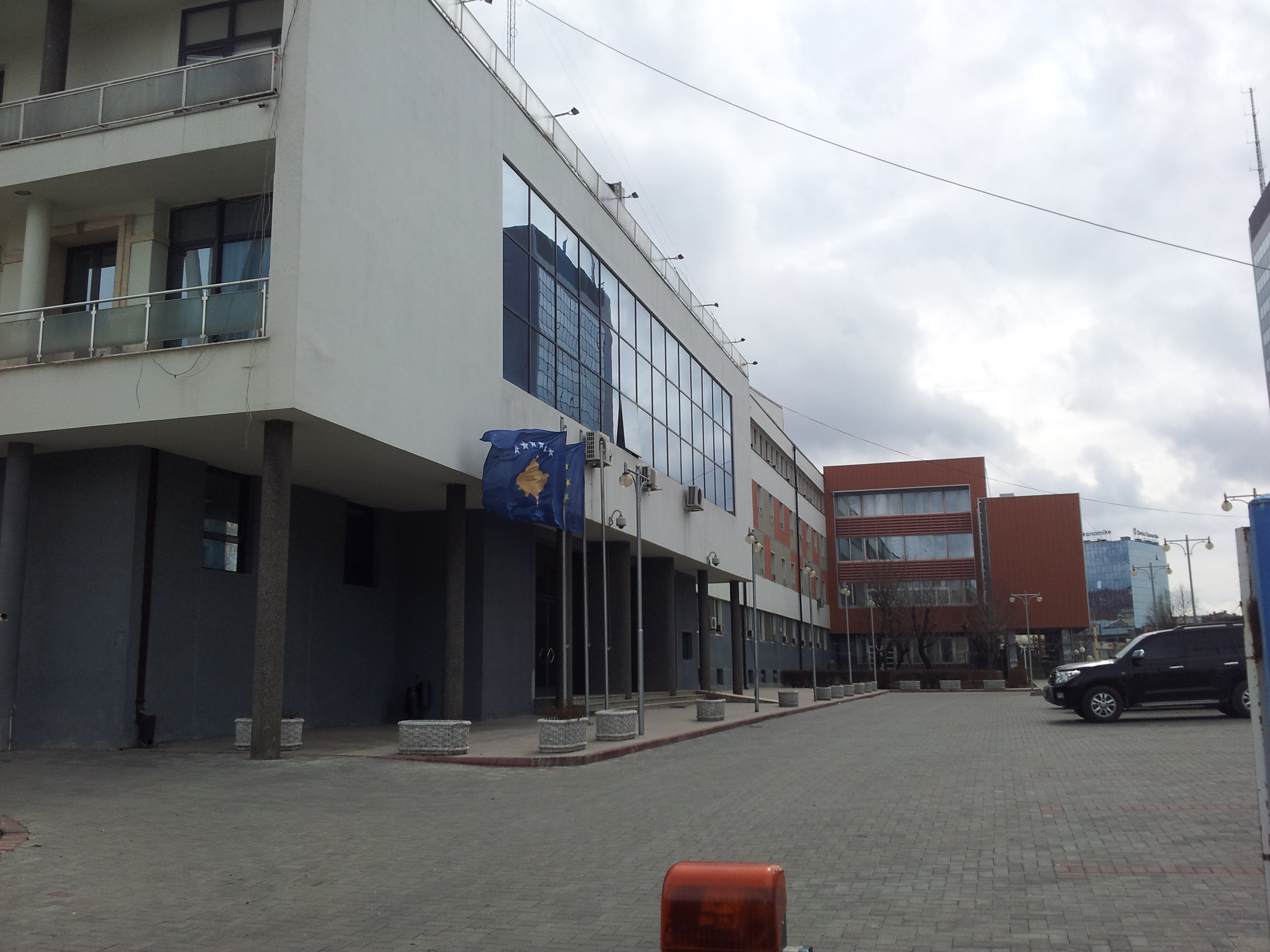
Additional entrance on KLA Street

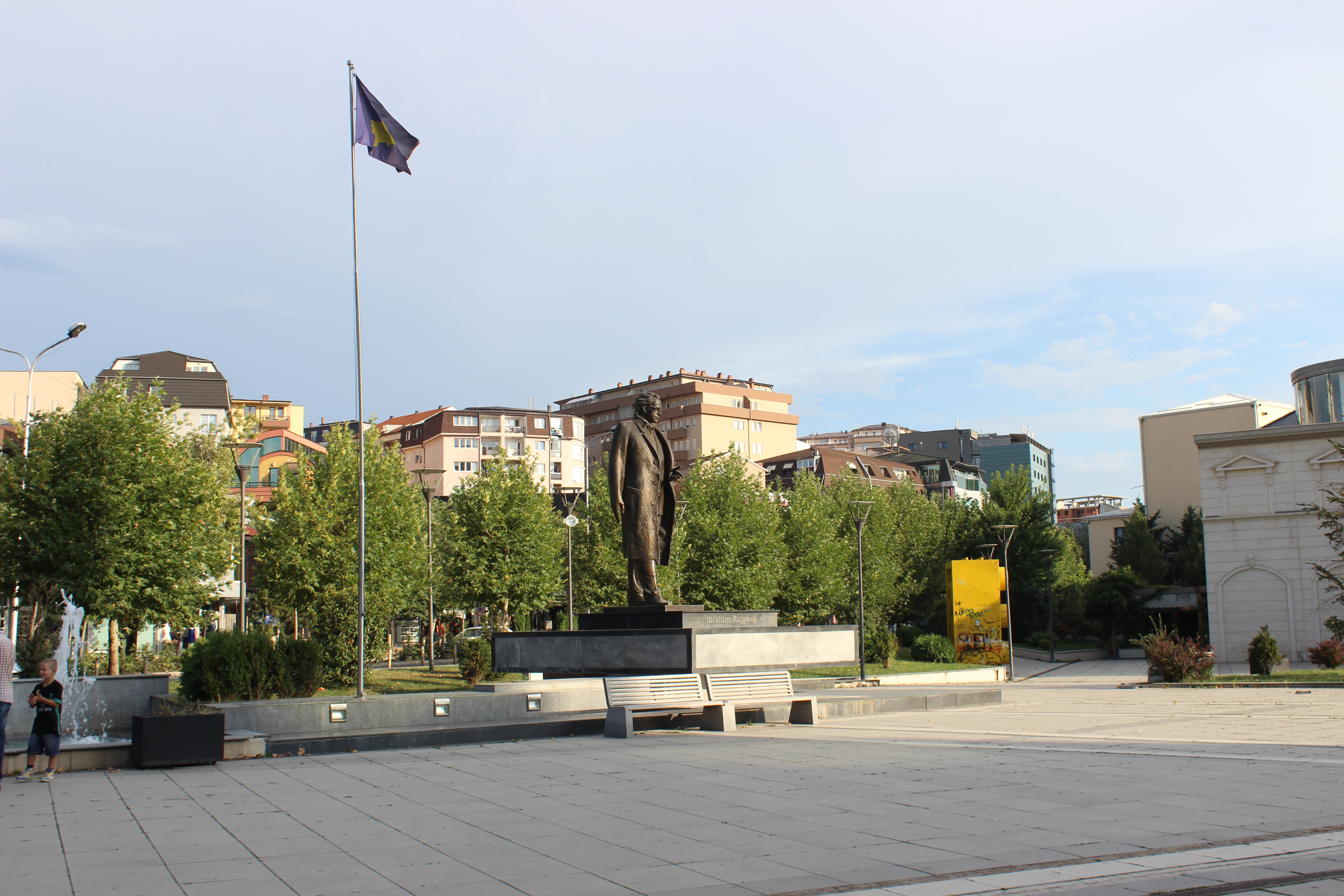
Ibrahim Rugova Square
