= Ashkali and Balkan Egyptians =

Ethnic group

- Flag

Regions with significant populations
- Kosovo: 26,960 (Note: 15,436 Ashkali and 11,524 Balkan Egyptians)
- North Macedonia: 3,713 (Note: Identified as Balkan Egyptians)
- Albania: 12,375
- Serbia (excluding Kosovo): 2,831 (Note: 1,484 Balkan Egyptians and 1,307 Ashkali at the 2022 census)
- Montenegro: 2,054
- Croatia: 172

Languages
- Albanian; Serbian; Macedonian

Religion
- Islam

The Ashkali (Serbian: Ашкалије / Aškalije), otherwise known as Hashkali (Serbian: Хашкалије / Haškalije) and/or Balkan Egyptians (Serbian: Балкански Египћани / Balkanski Egipćani; Albanian: Komuniteti i Egjiptianëve të Ballkanit; Macedonian: Ѓупци, romanized: Ǵupci), are Albanian and Slavic-speaking and (mainly) Muslim ethnic cultural minorities (recognized communities), which mainly inhabit Kosovo and southern Serbia, as well as Albania, Montenegro, and North Macedonia. Prior to the Kosovo War of 1999, the Balkan Egyptians or Ashkali people registered themselves as Albanians. While some Ashkali speak Romani, Egyptians do not. The two groups are not clearly delineated. Though they differ linguistically and culturally from the Roma, they have often been grouped together under the acronym RAE (Roma, Ashkali, and Egyptians).

== History of the Balkan Egyptians ==
The origins of the Balkan Egyptians are obscure, but some Balkan historians trace the origin of Balkan Egyptians to the Iron Age, citing references in Herodotus of the presence of Khener, an Ancient Egyptian dance group in the region. They also attribute archaeological structures in the area, notably in modern Ohrid and Bitola, as temples of the Goddess Isis, but the Mysteries of Isis was widespread in the Greco-Roman world.; other versions are that after the Ottoman–Egyptian invasion of Mani, Egyptian soldiers went to Albania. However, historians maintain that during the Ottoman era the Balkan Egyptians and other Balkan Roma were part of a single community that was called by the Ottomans Kıbti (literally 'Copts'), reflecting the same group encompassed by the English ethnonym for the Roma ("Gypsies"). They see the alternate origins as part of a larger phenomenon whereby groups such as the Ashkali and Balkan Egyptians, as part of an effort to achieve greater civil emancipation and to escape anti-Roma prejudice, made an effort to separate themselves from other Roma and constructed a novel history for their peoples.

A 14th-century reference to a placename (Агѹповы клѣти, Agupovy klěti) in the Rila Charter of Ivan Alexander of Bulgaria was thought by some authors, such as Konstantin Josef Jireček, to be related to the Balkan Egyptians.

In 1990, an Egyptian association was formed in Ohrid, which was attended by representatives from different Balkan countries.

== History of Ashkali ==
The origin of the Ashkali remains scientifically unexplained. The Ashkali community leaders have constructed a few narratives. According to the Persian narrative, the Ashkali people originated in Persia in the 4th century. According to the Italian narrative, which is based on folk etymology, they are colonists from ancient Rome. According to the Semitic narrative, originated in the town Ashkelon in Biblical Philistia.

The Ashkali were aligned with Albanians before, during and after the Kosovo war. During the war, many were sent to refugee camps with the Romani people in Kosovo. After the war ended in 1999, some of them reaffirmed their identity as Ashkali to show their pro-Albanian stance and distinguish themselves from the Arlije and Gurbeti Roma, who had been mistakenly viewed as pro-Serbian. However, viewed by the majority population as pro-Serbian Roma, they were persecuted by Albanian nationalists in the presence of NATO forces. As the majority of Kosovo Roma, many of them settled in Serbia and Montenegro. Others moved to Albania, Serbia and Macedonia and the whole of Western Europe, such as Germany and France.

The first Ashkali party (Democratic Ashkali Party of Kosovo) was formed in 2000 under Sabit Rrahmani, who supported Kosovo's independence in the name of all Ashkali.

== Demographics ==
Most Ashkali live in Kosovo, but they also reside in Serbia and Montenegro, while most Balkan Egyptians are thought to live in North Macedonia and Albania, rather than Kosovo. In the Macedonian census of 2002, 3,713 people identified as Egyptian, while in the Serbian census of 2002 (excluding Kosovo), 814 people identified as Egyptian. In the Montenegrin census, on the other hand, 225 people identified as Egyptian.

Ashkali are predominant in the central and eastern regions of Kosovo: Ferizaj, Fushë Kosova, and Lipjan. Kosovo's Egyptian community is mostly to be found in its western part, in Gjakova, Istog, Peja, and Deçan.

== Culture ==
In Kosovo, Roma and Ashkali do not classify one another as gadje. Ashkali and Balkan Egyptians reject having any relation with the Roma. The Ashkali and Roma claim the Egyptians as their own; whereas the Ashkali and Egyptians dispute over each other's background. No television or radio channels are dedicated to Kosovo's Ashkali or Egyptian minority audiences. Circumcision celebrations of their sons are organized by the Ashkali and Balkan Egyptians.

== See also ==
- Albanians in Egypt
- Copts
- Doma (caste)
- Doms in Egypt
- Democratic Ashkali Party of Kosovo
- Egyptian Liberal Party
- Romani people in Kosovo

== Cited works ==
- Dragan Novaković, Potomci faraona u Srbiji, DT Magazin, 4. April 1998.
- Marushiakova, Elena; Heuss, Herbert; Boev, Ivan; Rychlik, Jan; Ragaru, Nadege; Zemon, Rubin; Popov, Vesselin; Friedman, Victor (2001). Identity Formation among Minorities in the Balkans: The cases of Roms, Egyptians and Ashkali in Kosovo (PDF). Sofia: Minority Studies Society, Studii Romani.
