= Demographics of Kosovo =

- Population pyramid of Kosovo in 2022
- Population: ▼1,585,566 (2024)
- Growth rate: ▲0.68% (2024)
- Birth rate: ▼14.4 per 1,000 pop. (2024)
- Death rate: 7.2 per 1,000 pop. (2024)
- Life expectancy: ▲76.7 years (2011)
  - male: ▼74.1 years (2011)
  - female: ▲79.4 years (2011)
- Fertility rate: ▼1.87 children born/woman (2024)
- Infant mortality: ▼8.7 per 1,000 live births (2024)
- Net migration rate: -0.4 per 1,000 pop. (2024)

Age structure
- 0–14 years: 27.2%
- 15–64 years: 66.1%
- 65 and over: 6.7%

Sex ratio
- Total: 1.007 male(s)/female

Nationality
- Nationality: noun: Kosovar/Kosovan(s) adjective: Kosovar
- Major ethnic: Albanians (91.8%) (2024)
- Minor ethnic: Serbs (2.3%), (Note: Due to political issues, Serbs have avoided participating in the population censuses conducted by the Republic of Kosovo. The census is therefore inaccurate to explain the real demographic spread in Kosovo. Serbs form the second largest ethnic group in Kosovo, after Albanians. Estimates are that Serbs hold 6-7% of the population.) Bosniaks (1.7%), Turks (1.2%), Ashkali (1%) and others

Language
- Official: Albanian; Serbian
- Spoken: Albanian (93.67%) languages of the minorities (6.33%)

The Kosovo Agency of Statistics monitors various demographic features of the population of Kosovo, such as population density, ethnicity, education level, health of the populace, economic status, religious affiliations and other aspects of the population. Censuses, normally conducted at ten-year intervals, record the demographic characteristics of the population.

According to the last census of April 2024 by the Kosovo Agency of Statistics, there were 1,588,566 inhabitants, of whom 795,552 were men (50.08%) and 790,014 were women (49.92%). The same year, US CIA World Factbook estimate put the country's population at 1,977,093. According to the first census conducted after the 2008 declaration of independence in 2011, the permanent population of Kosovo was 1,739,825.

Kosovo is a predominately ethnically and linguistically homogeneous country. The 2024 census shows that ethnic Albanians make the overwhelming majority of Kosovo, with 91.8% of the population, while minorities include Serbs (2.3%), (Note: The Kosovo Agency of Statistics (ASK) conducted a population assessment for four northern municipalities: Leposaviq, Zveçan, Zubin Potok, and North Mitrovica, which are predominantly inhabited by Serbs who largely boycotted the registration process. This assessment was carried out in collaboration with international experts, following international standards and practices for population evaluation.) Bosniaks (1.7%), Turks (1.2%), Ashkali (1%) and other ethnicities all less than 1%.

The official languages of Kosovo are Albanian and Serbian. Albanian is the native language for 93.67% of the population, while minority languages are also officially recognized in certain municipalities, depending on their ethnic makeup. The main religions of Kosovo are Islam (93.49%), Eastern Orthodox (2.31%) and Roman Catholic (1.75%). The average urbanization of Kosovo is at 50.18%, with a growing trend.

Kosovo has the youngest population in Europe. The average age is 34.8 and median age is 32, as of 2024. In 2008, half of its population was under the age of 25 (United Nations Development Programme data) and more than 65% of the population was younger than 30 (government data). According to UNICEF, approximately 26% of Kosovo’s population is aged 0–18. This categorization is consistent with the definition provided in the Convention on the Rights of the Child (CRC), which considers every person below the age of 18 to be a child.

== History ==
Historical population
| Year | Pop. | ±% p.a. |
|---|---|---|
| 1921 | 439,010 | — |
| 1931 | 552,064 | +2.32% |
| 1948 | 733,034 | +1.68% |
| 1953 | 815,908 | +2.17% |
| 1961 | 963,988 | +2.11% |
| 1971 | 1,243,693 | +2.58% |
| 1981 | 1,584,440 | +2.45% |
| 1991 | 1,956,196 | +2.13% |
| 2011 | 1,780,021 | −0.47% |
| 2024 | 1,602,515 | −0.80% |

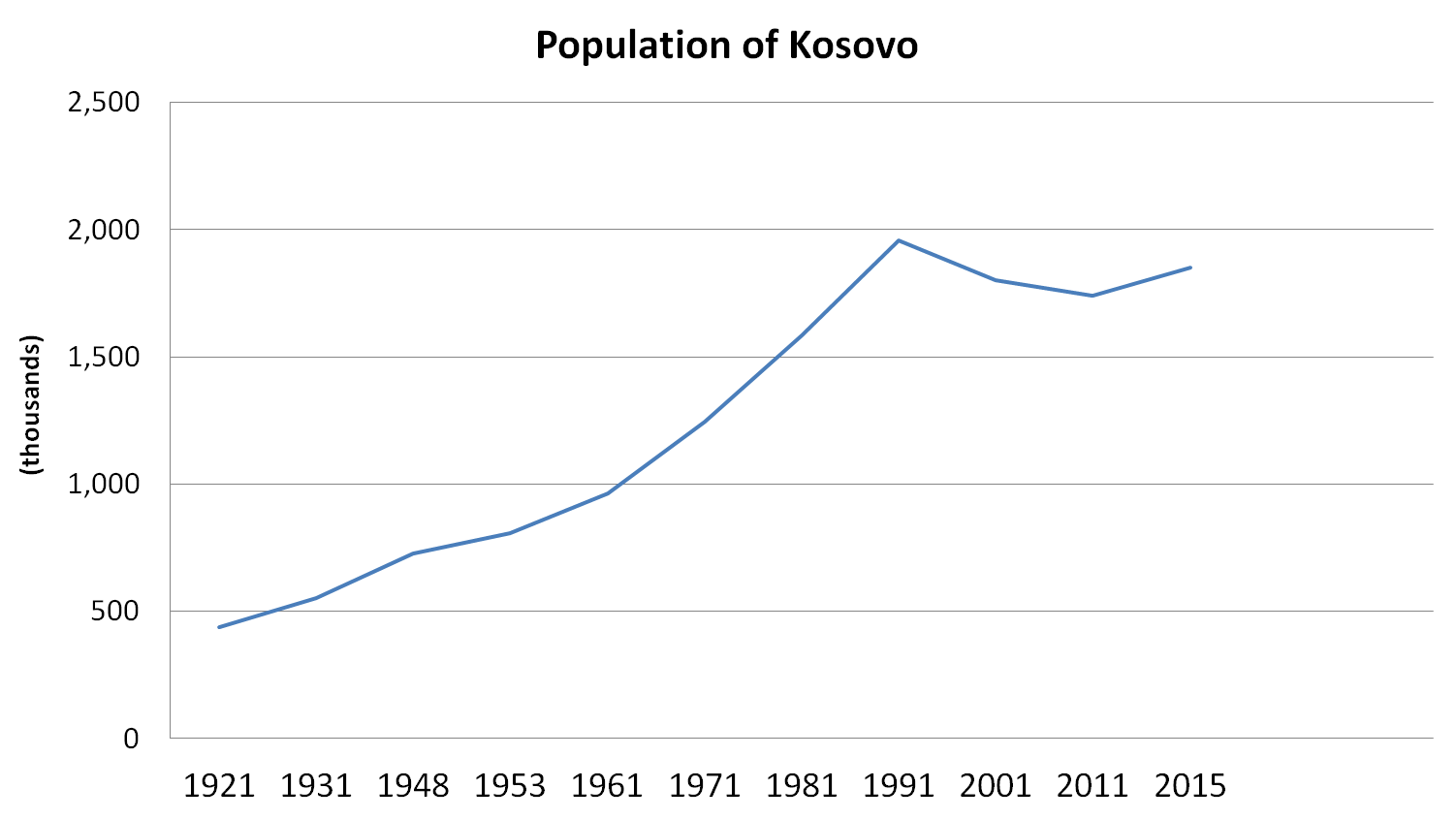
Population of Kosovo from 1921 to 2015

View source data.
View source data.
View source data.

== 2011 census ==
The 2011 census recorded Kosovo (excluding North Kosovo) as having 1,739,825 inhabitants. The European Centre for Minority Issues (ECMI) has called "for caution when referring to the 2011 census", due to the boycott by Serb-majority municipalities in North Kosovo and the widespread boycott by Serbs and Roma in southern Kosovo. The recorded total population was below most previous estimates. The census received considerable technical assistance from international agencies and appears to have been endorsed by Eurostat; it was, however, the first full census since 1981, and not one of an uninterrupted series. The results show that there were no people temporarily resident in hotels or refugee camps at the time of the census; that out of 312,711 conventional dwellings, 99,808 (over 30%) were unoccupied; and that three municipalities designated under the Ahtisaari Plan to have Serb majorities – Klokot, Novo Brdo, and Štrpce – in fact had ethnic Albanian majorities (although their municipal assemblies have Serb majorities).

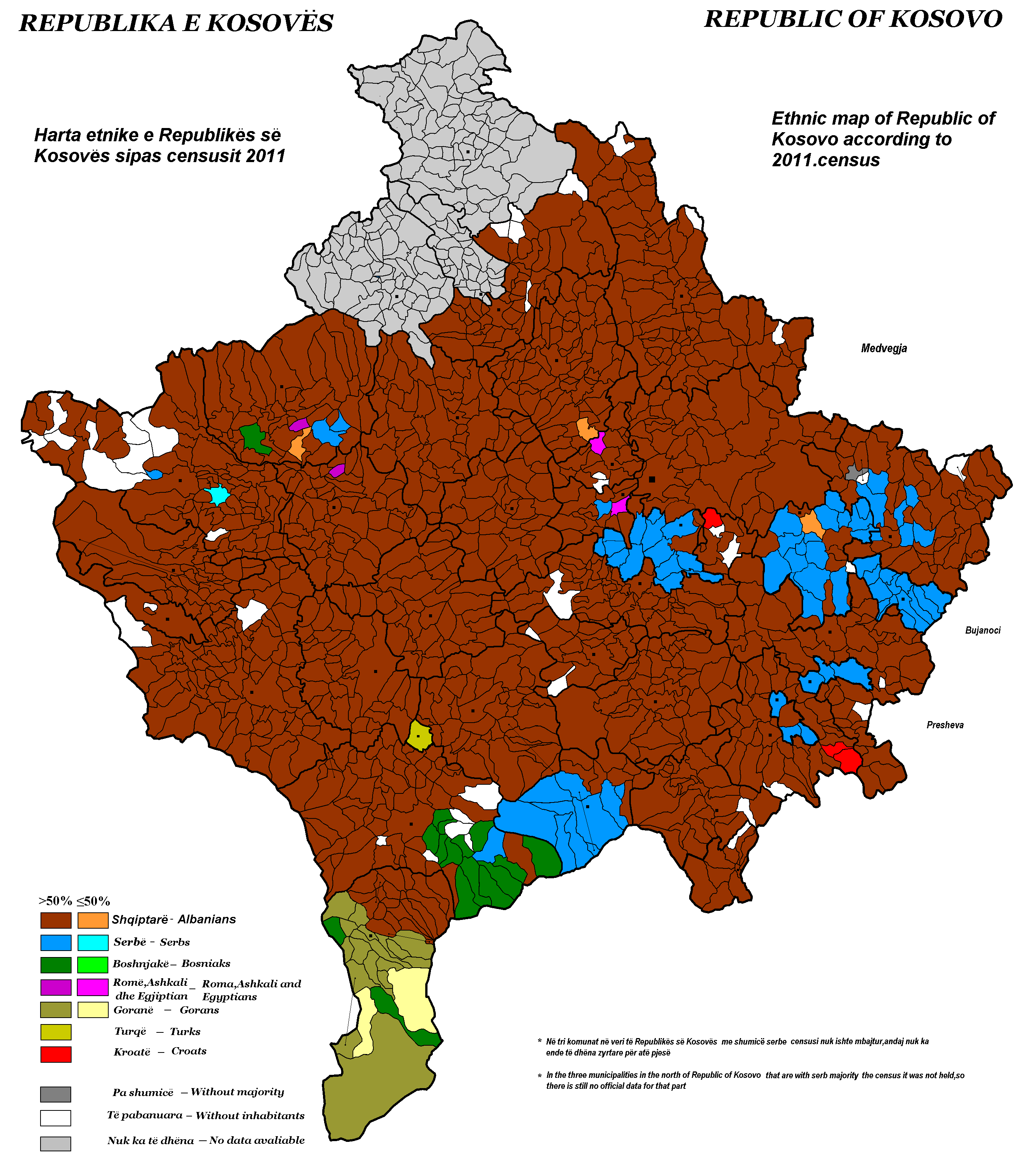
Kosovo ethnic map 2011 by settlement

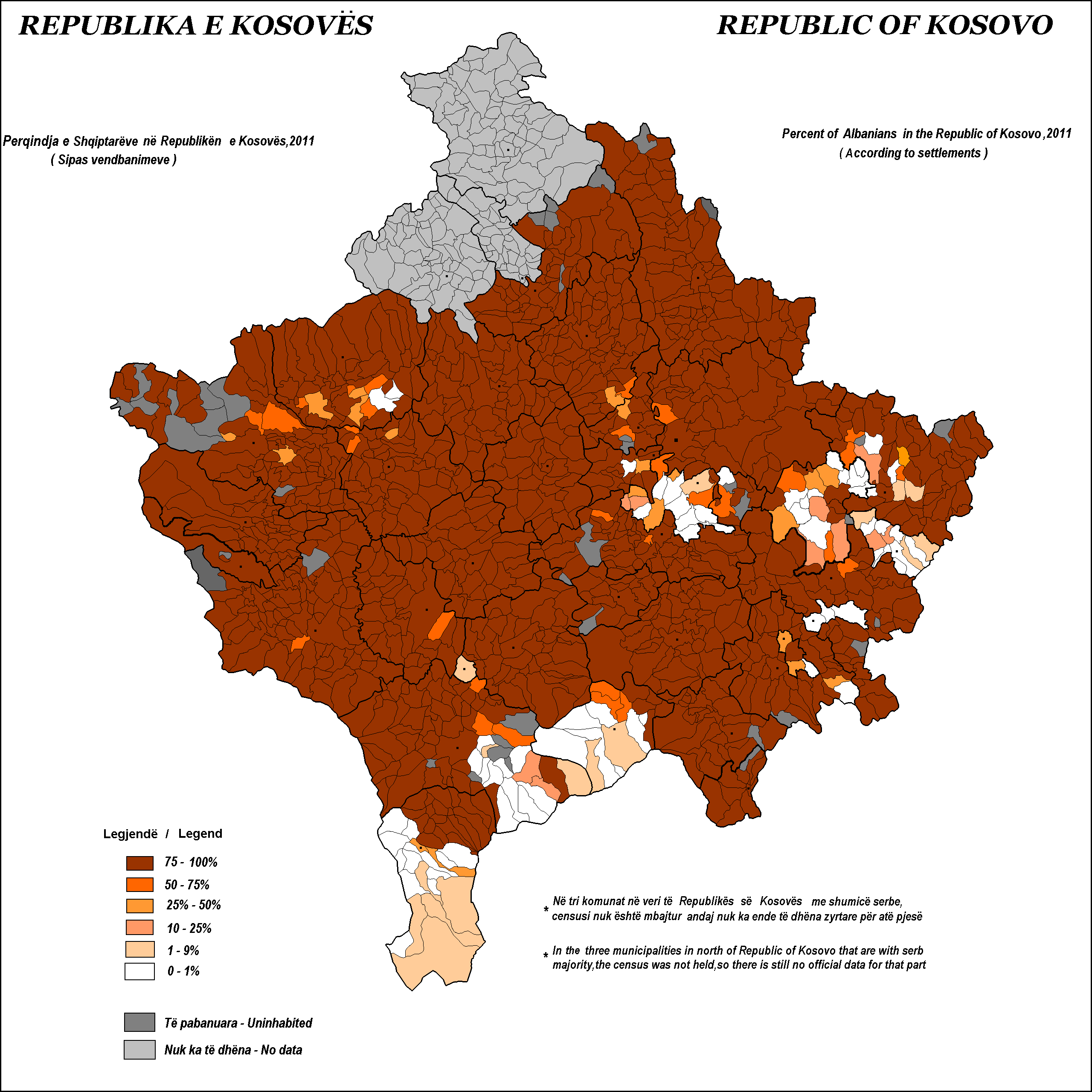
Distribution of Albanians in Kosovo 2011 by settlements

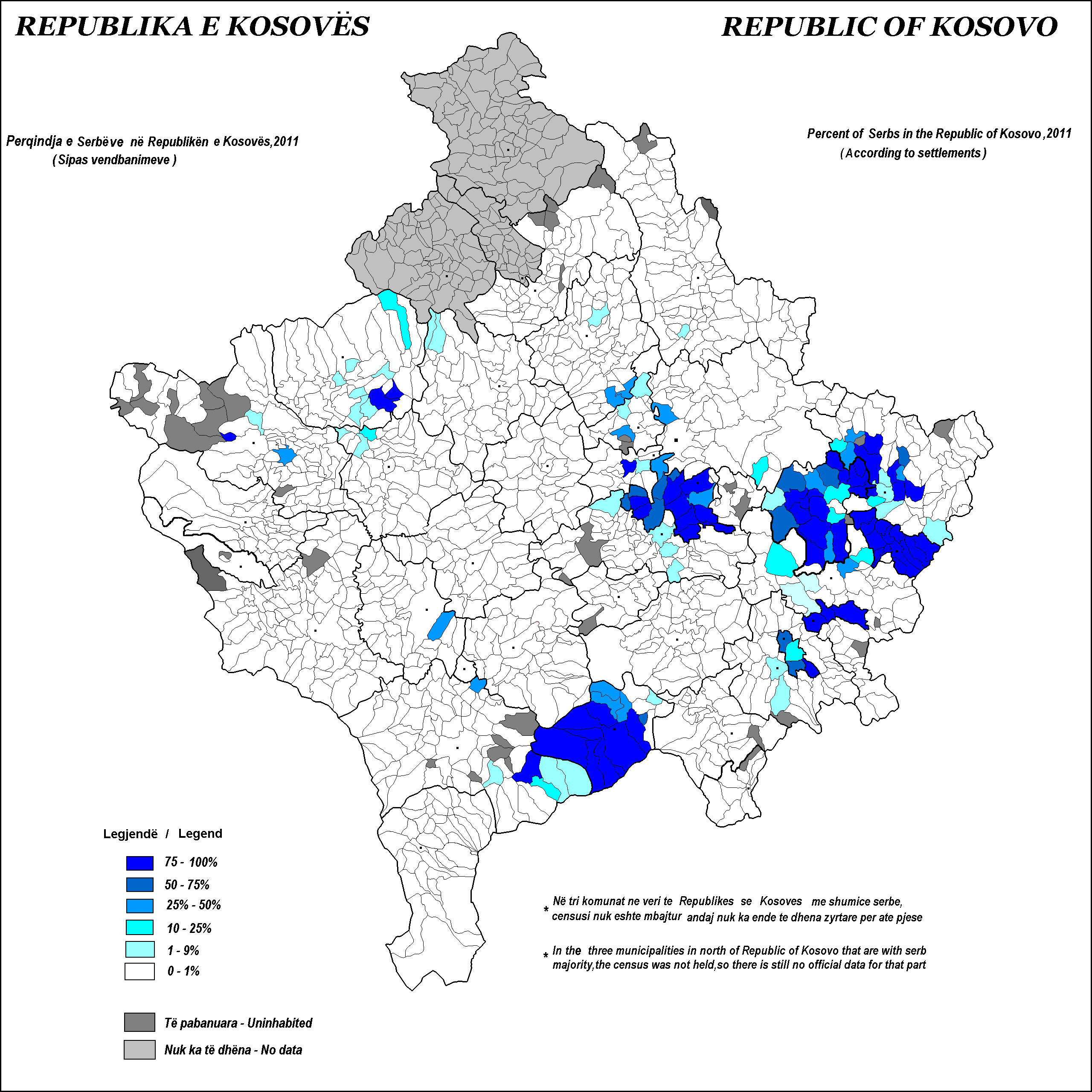
Distribution of Serbs in Kosovo by settlements 2011

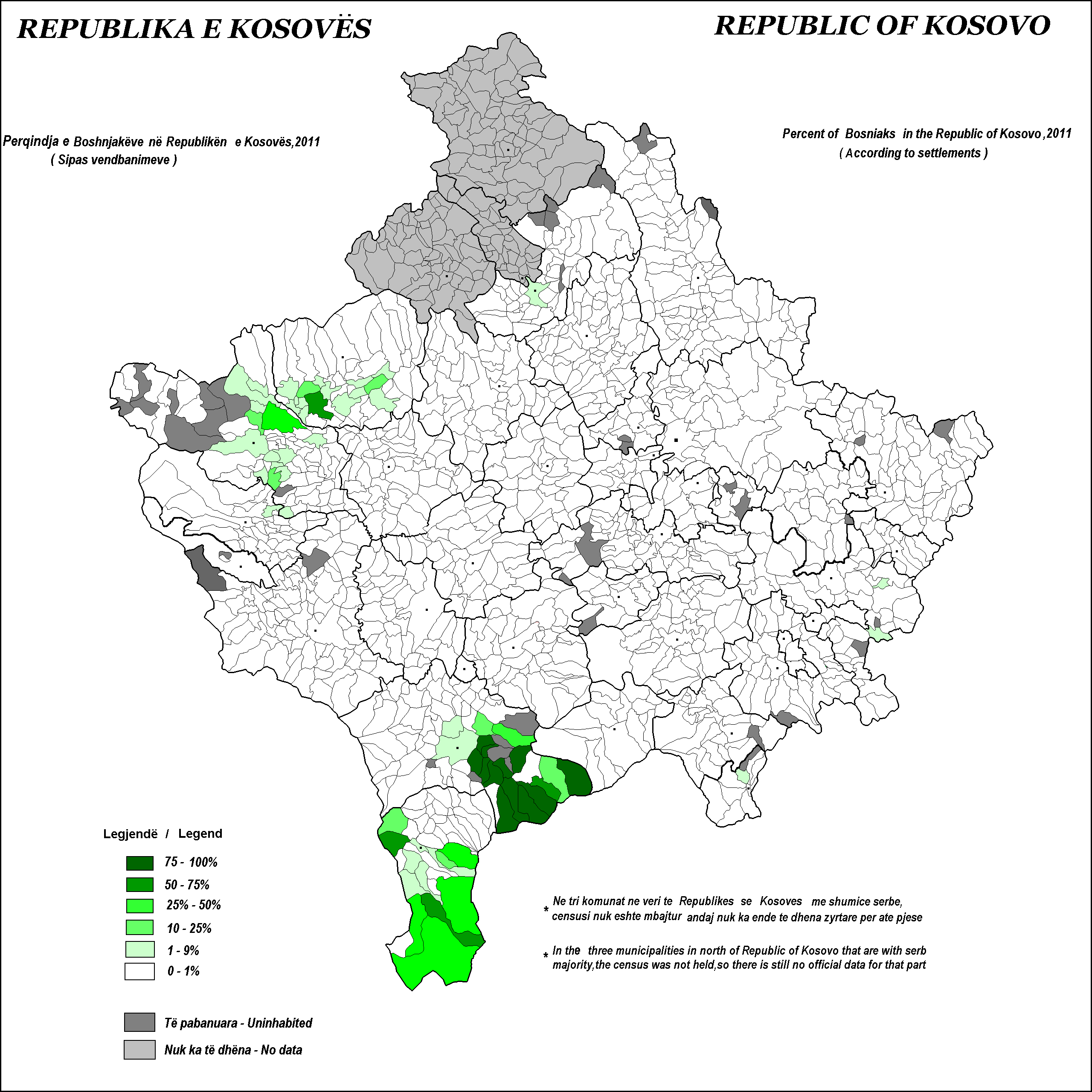
Distribution of Bosniaks in Kosovo by settlements

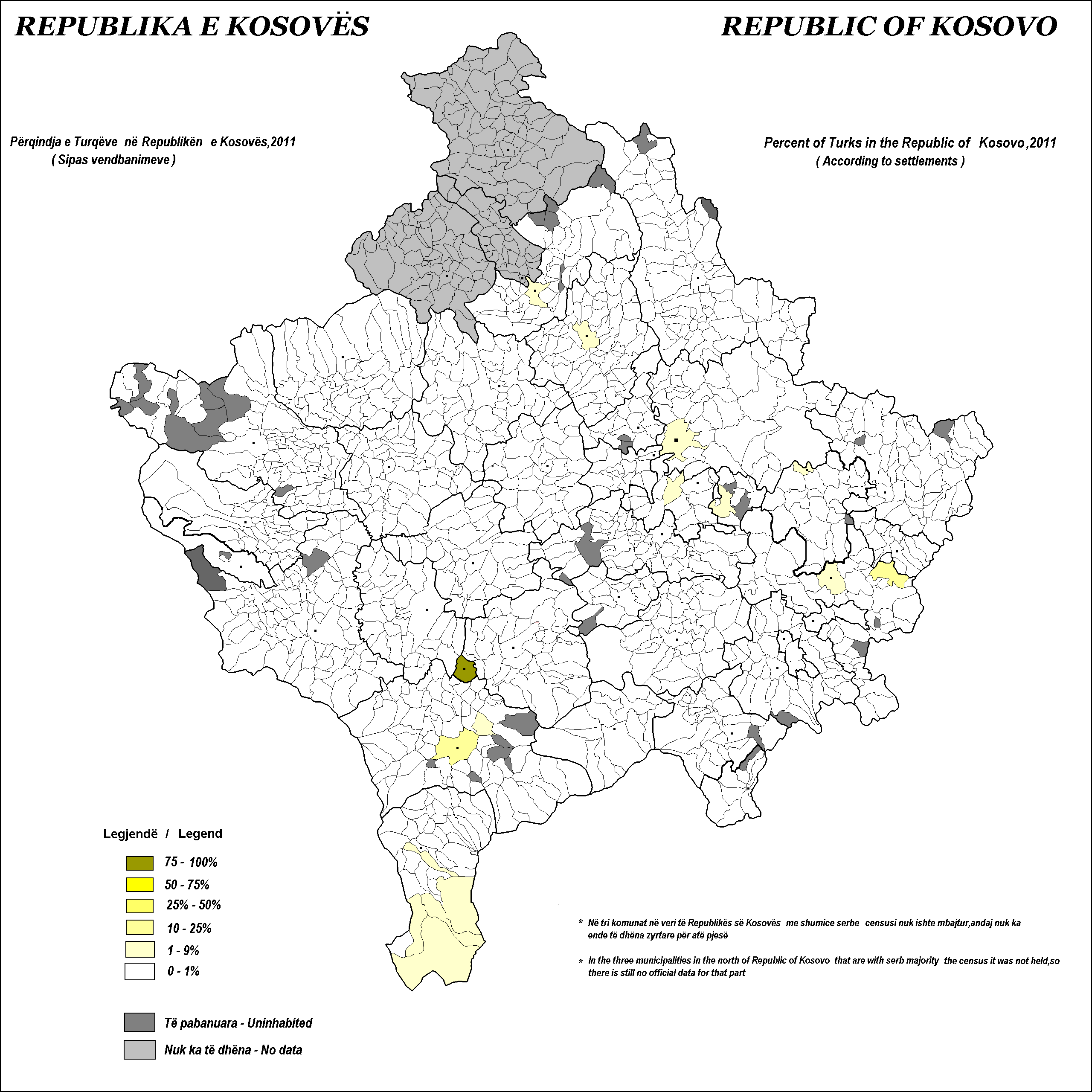
Distribution of Turks in Kosovo by settlements

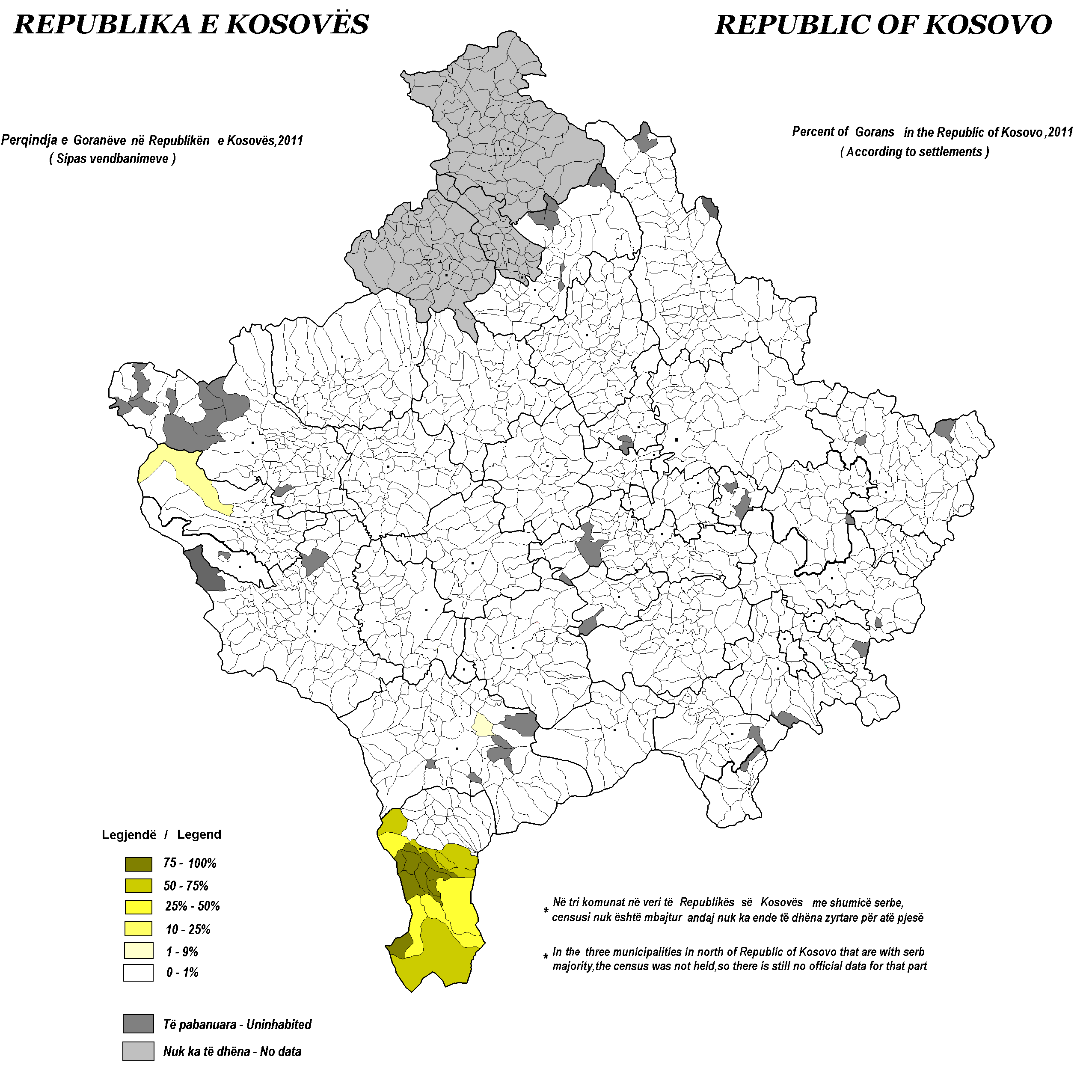
Distribution of Gorani in Kosovo by settlements

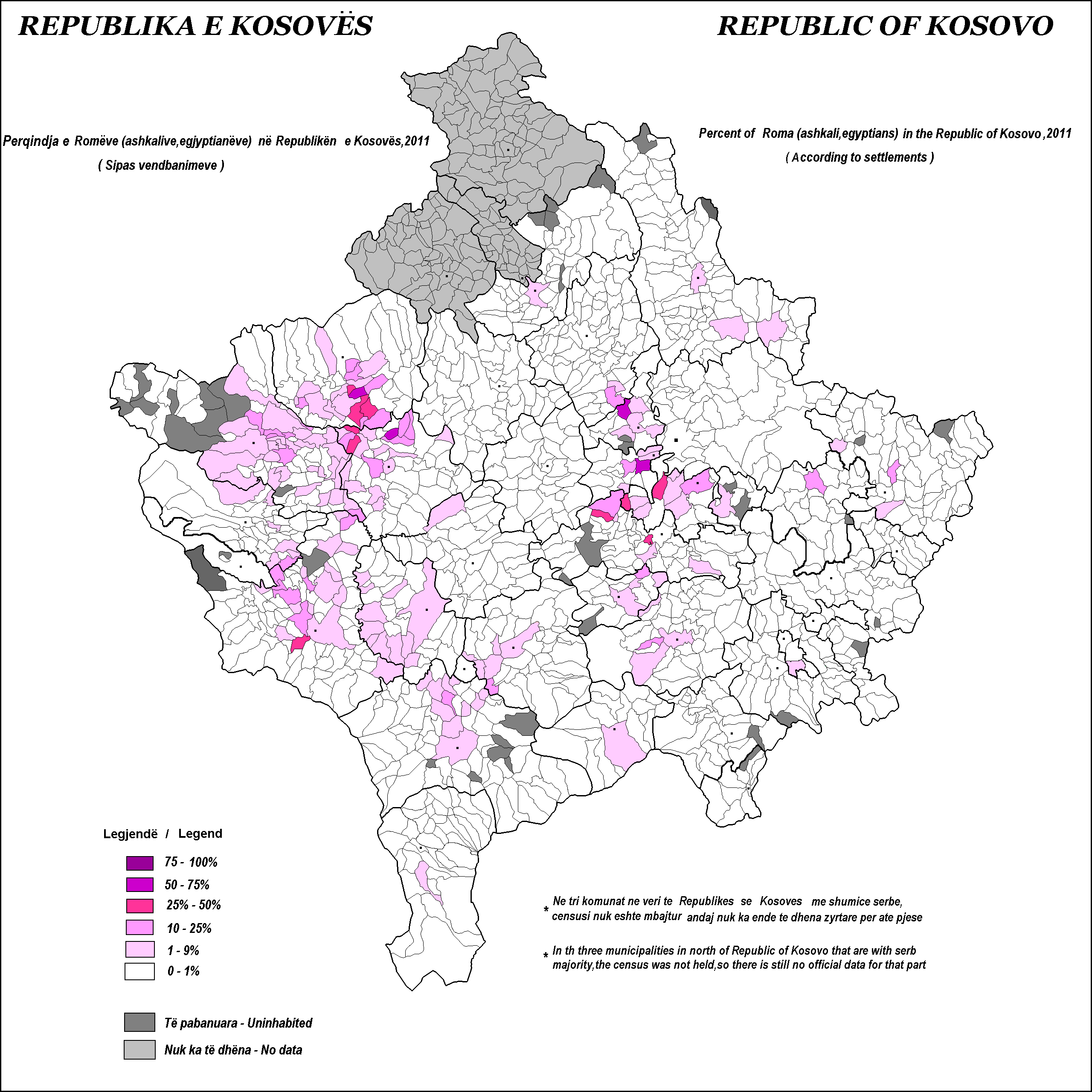
Distribution of Roma, Ashkali and Egyptians in Kosovo by settlements

== Vital statistics ==
Source: Kosovo Agency of Statistics

Population estimates in the table below may be unreliable during the 1990s period. Besides, vital statistics do not fully include data from Serb-majority territories. Since 2011, in accordance with European statistical norms, live births and deaths record figures in Kosovo only (excluding foreign countries).

| Year | Average population | Live births | Deaths | Natural change | Crude birth rate (per 1000) | Crude death rate (per 1000) | Natural change (per 1000) | Crude migration rate (per 1000) | Total fertility rate | Female fertile population (15–49 years) |
|---|---|---|---|---|---|---|---|---|---|---|
| 1950 | 764,000 | 35,222 | 12,991 | 22,231 | 46.1 | 17.0 | 29.1 | | 7.70 | 164,096 |
| 1951 | 780,000 | 29,299 | 14,833 | 14,466 | 37.6 | 19.0 | 18.5 | 2.4 | 6.17 | 169,877 |
| 1952 | 793,000 | 35,619 | 13,867 | 21,752 | 44.9 | 17.5 | 27.4 | -10.7 | 7.23 | 175,660 |
| 1953 | 813,000 | 34,595 | 16,726 | 17,869 | 42.6 | 20.6 | 22.0 | 3.2 | 6.62 | 181,445 |
| 1954 | 832,000 | 38,595 | 13,201 | 25,394 | 46.4 | 15.9 | 30.5 | -7.1 | 7.16 | 185,718 |
| 1955 | 842,000 | 36,736 | 15,292 | 21,444 | 43.6 | 18.2 | 25.5 | -13.5 | 6.62 | 189,992 |
| 1956 | 859,000 | 37,819 | 13,692 | 24,127 | 44.0 | 15.9 | 28.1 | -7.9 | 6.56 | 194,265 |
| 1957 | 873,000 | 34,159 | 15,300 | 18,859 | 39.1 | 17.5 | 21.6 | -5.3 | 5.84 | 192,596 |
| 1958 | 890,000 | 39,285 | 11,598 | 27,687 | 44.1 | 13.0 | 31.1 | -11.6 | 6.62 | 195,341 |
| 1959 | 921,000 | 37,364 | 12,878 | 24,486 | 40.6 | 14.0 | 26.6 | 8.2 | 6.14 | 199,359 |
| 1960 | 944,000 | 41,631 | 13,365 | 28,266 | 44.1 | 14.2 | 29.9 | -4.9 | 6.64 | 203,954 |
| 1961 | 967,353 | 40,561 | 11,759 | 28,802 | 41.9 | 12.2 | 29.8 | -5.1 | 6.26 | 208,550 |
| 1962 | 994,676 | 41,336 | 15,024 | 26,312 | 41.6 | 15.1 | 26.5 | 1.7 | 6.23 | 212,149 |
| 1963 | 1,022,218 | 41,525 | 12,423 | 29,102 | 40.6 | 12.2 | 28.5 | -0.8 | 6.13 | 217,556 |
| 1964 | 1,051,498 | 42,557 | 12,731 | 29,826 | 40.5 | 12.1 | 28.4 | 0.2 | 6.14 | 224,326 |
| 1965 | 1,082,170 | 43,569 | 11,767 | 31,802 | 40.3 | 10.9 | 29.4 | -0.2 | 5.97 | 233,584 |
| 1966 | 1,118,003 | 42,429 | 10,266 | 32,163 | 38.0 | 9.2 | 28.8 | 4.3 | 5.66 | 240,125 |
| 1967 | 1,150,622 | 44,001 | 11,308 | 32,693 | 38.2 | 9.8 | 28.4 | 0.8 | 5.71 | 248,992 |
| 1968 | 1,182,952 | 44,627 | 10,781 | 33,846 | 37.7 | 9.1 | 28.6 | -0.5 | 5.64 | 257,056 |
| 1969 | 1,189,140 | 46,480 | 10,892 | 35,588 | 39.1 | 9.2 | 29.9 | -24.7 | 5.69 | 267,271 |
| 1970 | 1,219,996 | 44,496 | 10,829 | 33,667 | 36.5 | 8.9 | 27.6 | -1.7 | 5.40 | 268,960 |
| 1971 | 1,253,975 | 47,060 | 10,312 | 36,748 | 37.5 | 8.2 | 29.3 | -1.4 | 5.74 | 270,050 |
| 1972 | 1,290,965 | 47,943 | 10,270 | 37,673 | 37.1 | 8.0 | 29.2 | 0.3 | 5.57 | 283,885 |
| 1973 | 1,327,853 | 47,714 | 10,358 | 37,356 | 35.9 | 7.8 | 28.1 | 0.5 | 5.35 | 293,340 |
| 1974 | 1,365,879 | 49,847 | 10,075 | 39,772 | 36.5 | 7.4 | 29.1 | -0.5 | 5.40 | 303,396 |
| 1975 | 1,404,977 | 49,310 | 10,018 | 39,292 | 35.1 | 7.1 | 28.0 | 0.6 | 5.19 | 313,611 |
| 1976 | 1,446,001 | 51,355 | 10,149 | 41,206 | 35.5 | 7.0 | 28.5 | 0.7 | 5.24 | 324,297 |
| 1977 | 1,486,816 | 49,849 | 9,811 | 40,038 | 33.5 | 6.6 | 26.9 | 1.3 | 4.92 | 334,581 |
| 1978 | 1,525,960 | 49,027 | 9,776 | 39,251 | 32.1 | 6.4 | 25.7 | 0.6 | 4.66 | 344,970 |
| 1979 | 1,565,995 | 48,125 | 9,575 | 38,550 | 30.7 | 6.1 | 24.6 | 1.6 | 4.51 | 349,520 |
| 1980 | 1,552,779 | 53,147 | 8,909 | 44,238 | 34.2 | 5.7 | 28.5 | -38.9 | 4.82 | 354,068 |
| 1981 | 1,594,451 | 48,111 | 9,677 | 38,434 | 30.2 | 6.1 | 24.1 | 2.7 | 4.55 | 351,396 |
| 1982 | 1,634,893 | 52,865 | 10,479 | 42,386 | 32.3 | 6.4 | 25.9 | -0.5 | 4.71 | 361,232 |
| 1983 | 1,676,325 | 49,645 | 11,040 | 38,605 | 29.6 | 6.6 | 23.0 | 2.3 | 4.29 | 372,615 |
| 1984 | 1,716,884 | 55,243 | 10,573 | 44,670 | 32.2 | 6.2 | 26.0 | -1.8 | 4.58 | 391,155 |
| 1985 | 1,760,132 | 53,925 | 11,826 | 42,099 | 30.6 | 6.7 | 23.9 | 1.3 | 4.30 | 403,640 |
| 1986 | 1,803,579 | 54,519 | 10,446 | 44,073 | 30.2 | 5.8 | 24.4 | 0.3 | 4.18 | 415,407 |
| 1987 | 1,848,111 | 56,221 | 10,307 | 45,914 | 30.4 | 5.6 | 24.8 | -0.1 | 4.12 | 429,439 |
| 1988 | 1,894,131 | 56,283 | 10,257 | 46,026 | 29.7 | 5.4 | 24.3 | 0.6 | 3.96 | 441,867 |
| 1989 | 1,938,794 | 53,656 | 10,181 | 43,475 | 27.7 | 5.3 | 22.4 | 1.2 | 3.63 | 454,260 |
| 1990 | 1,987,056 | 55,175 | 8,214 | 46,961 | 27.8 | 4.1 | 23.6 | 1.3 | 3.59 | 472,145 |
| 1991 | 1,967,675 | 52,263 | 8,526 | 43,737 | 26.6 | 4.3 | 22.2 | -32.0 | 3.52 | 454,214 |
| 1992 | 2,007,978 | 44,418 | 8,004 | 36,414 | 22.1 | 4.0 | 18.1 | 2.4 | 2.83 | 478,106 |
| 1993 | 2,043,740 | 44,132 | 7,804 | 36,328 | 21.6 | 3.8 | 17.8 | 0 | 2.71 | 492,412 |
| 1994 | 2,079,234 | 43,450 | 7,667 | 35,783 | 20.9 | 3.7 | 17.2 | 0.2 | 2.57 | 506,408 |
| 1995 | 2,115,020 | 44,776 | 8,671 | 36,105 | 21.2 | 4.1 | 17.1 | 0.1 | 2.55 | 521,049 |
| 1996 | 2,152,545 | 46,041 | 8,392 | 37,649 | 21.4 | 3.9 | 17.5 | 0.2 | 2.56 | 535,874 |
| 1997 | 2,188,083 | 42,920 | 8,624 | 34,296 | 19.6 | 3.9 | 15.7 | 0.8 | 2.33 | 549,826 |
| 1998 | 2,127,795 | 41,752 | 8,123 | 33,629 | 19.6 | 3.8 | 15.8 | 43.4 | 2.34 | 543,799 |
| 1999 | 2,067,507 | 40,020 | 7,569 | 32,451 | 19.4 | 3.7 | 15.7 | -44.0 | 2.28 | 537,773 |
| 2000 | 2,007,219 | 38,687 | 7,115 | 31,572 | 19.3 | 3.5 | 15.7 | -44.9 | 2.31 | 531,747 |
| 2001 | 1,946,932 | 37,412 | 6,672 | 30,740 | 19.2 | 3.4 | 15.8 | -45.8 | 2.26 | 525,719 |
| 2002 | 1,886,644 | 36,136 | 5,654 | 30,482 | 19.2 | 3.0 | 16.2 | -47.2 | 2.22 | 519,692 |
| 2003 | 1,826,356 | 31,994 | 6,417 | 25,577 | 17.5 | 3.5 | 14.0 | -46.0 | 2.00 | 513,664 |
| 2004 | 1,766,068 | 35,063 | 6,399 | 28,664 | 19.9 | 3.6 | 16.2 | -49.2 | 2.21 | 507,639 |
| 2005 | 1,743,780 | 37,218 | 7,207 | 30,011 | 21.3 | 4.1 | 17.2 | -29.8 | 2.38 | 501,613 |
| 2006 | 1,719,536 | 34,187 | 7,479 | 26,708 | 19.9 | 4.3 | 15.5 | -29.4 | 2.24 | 495,586 |
| 2007 | 1,733,404 | 33,112 | 6,681 | 26,431 | 19.1 | 3.9 | 15.2 | -7.1 | 2.21 | 489,559 |
| 2008 | 1,747,383 | 34,399 | 6,852 | 27,547 | 19.7 | 3.9 | 15.8 | -7.7 | 2.32 | 483,531 |
| 2009 | 1,761,474 | 34,240 | 7,030 | 27,210 | 19.4 | 4.0 | 15.4 | -7.3 | 2.36 | 477,507 |
| 2010 | 1,775,680 | 33,751 | 7,234 | 26,517 | 19.0 | 4.1 | 14.9 | -6.8 | 2.38 | 471,479 |
| 2011 | 1,786,229 | 27,626 | 7,111 | 20,515 | 15.5 | 4.0 | 11.5 | -5.6 | 1.99 | 465,452 |
| 2012 | 1,806,441 | 27,743 | 7,317 | 20,426 | 15.4 | 4.1 | 11.3 | 0.4 | 2.02 | 459,662 |
| 2013 | 1,812,600 | 29,327 | 7,135 | 22,192 | 16.2 | 3.9 | 12.2 | -6.1 | 2.17 | 453,872 |
| 2014 | 1,793,401 | 25,929 | 7,634 | 18,295 | 14.5 | 4.3 | 10.2 | 13.0 | 1.95 | 448,082 |
| 2015 | 1,744,785 | 24,594 | 8,202 | 16,392 | 14.1 | 4.7 | 9.4 | -22.7 | 1.88 | 442,291 |
| 2016 | 1,715,459 | 23,416 | 8,495 | 14,921 | 13.6 | 5.0 | 8.7 | -14.4 | 1.82 | 436,501 |
| 2017 | 1,720,720 | 23,402 | 8,721 | 14,681 | 13.6 | 5.1 | 8.5 | -0.6 | 1.86 | 430,711 |
| 2018 | 1,716,109 | 22,761 | 8,998 | 13,763 | 13.3 | 5.2 | 8.0 | -4.3 | 1.84 | 424,921 |
| 2019 | 1,693,981 | 21,798 | 9,430 | 12,368 | 12.9 | 5.6 | 7.3 | -11.5 | 1.79 | 419,131 |
| 2020 | 1,684,355 | 21,907 | 12,987 | 8,920 | 13.0 | 7.7 | 5.3 | -4.3 | 1.85 | 413,341 |
| 2021 | 1,665,246 | 22,830 | 13,019 | 9,811 | 13.7 | 7.8 | 5.9 | -7.8 | 1.96 | 407,550 |
| 2022 | 1,624,337 | 22,632 | 9,845 | 12,787 | 13.9 | 6.1 | 7.9 | -20.9 | 1.98 | 401,760 |
| 2023 | 1,603,115 | 21,654 | 9,622 | 12,032 | 13.5 | 6.0 | 7.5 | | 1.93 | 395,970 |
| 2024 | 1,585,566 | 21,487 | 10,137 | 11,350 | 13.5 | 6.4 | 7.1 | | 1.95 | 390,180 |
| 2025 | 1,582,322 | 22,045 | 10,297 | 11,748 | 13.9 | | | | 2.01(e) | |

=== Current vital statistics ===
| Period | Live births | Deaths | Natural increase |
|---|---|---|---|
| January—September 2025 | 16,640 | 7,330 | +9,310 |
| January—September 2026 | 16,966 | 7,237 | +9,729 |
| Difference | ▲ +326 (+1.96%) | ▼ -93 (-1.27%) | ▲ +419 |

== Marriages and divorces ==
| | Average population | Marriages | Divorces | Crude marriage rate (per 1000) | Crude divorce rate (per 1000) | Divorces per 1000 marriages |
|---|---|---|---|---|---|---|
| 1950 | 764,000 | 8,686 | 481 | 11.4 | 0.6 | 55.4 |
| 1951 | 780,000 | 7,300 | 475 | 9.4 | 0.6 | 65.1 |
| 1952 | 793,000 | 7,052 | 406 | 8.9 | 0.5 | 57.6 |
| 1953 | 813,000 | 7,208 | 382 | 8.9 | 0.5 | 53.0 |
| 1954 | 832,000 | 7,390 | 352 | 8.9 | 0.4 | 47.6 |
| 1955 | 842,000 | 6,815 | 445 | 8.1 | 0.5 | 65.3 |
| 1956 | 859,000 | 5,723 | 426 | 6.7 | 0.5 | 74.4 |
| 1957 | 873,000 | 5,860 | 403 | 6.7 | 0.5 | 68.8 |
| 1958 | 890,000 | 6,924 | 374 | 7.8 | 0.4 | 54.0 |
| 1959 | 921,000 | 6,794 | 498 | 7.4 | 0.5 | 73.3 |
| 1960 | 944,000 | 6,822 | 417 | 7.2 | 0.4 | 61.1 |
| 1961 | 967,353 | 7,426 | 479 | 7.7 | 0.5 | 64.5 |
| 1962 | 994,676 | 7,481 | 451 | 7.5 | 0.5 | 60.3 |
| 1963 | 1,022,218 | 7,183 | 346 | 7.0 | 0.3 | 48.2 |
| 1964 | 1,051,498 | 8,340 | 388 | 7.9 | 0.4 | 46.5 |
| 1965 | 1,082,170 | 8,226 | 347 | 7.6 | 0.3 | 42.2 |
| 1966 | 1,118,003 | 8,246 | 514 | 7.4 | 0.5 | 62.3 |
| 1967 | 1,150,622 | 7,569 | 314 | 6.6 | 0.3 | 41.5 |
| 1968 | 1,182,952 | 8,719 | 244 | 7.4 | 0.2 | 28.0 |
| 1969 | 1,189,140 | 10,083 | 226 | 8.5 | 0.2 | 22.4 |
| 1970 | 1,219,996 | 11,280 | 258 | 9.2 | 0.2 | 22.9 |
| 1971 | 1,253,975 | 11,006 | 238 | 8.8 | 0.2 | 21.6 |
| 1972 | 1,290,965 | 10,571 | 272 | 8.2 | 0.2 | 25.7 |
| 1973 | 1,327,853 | 11,139 | 198 | 8.4 | 0.1 | 17.8 |
| 1974 | 1,365,879 | 9,885 | 337 | 7.2 | 0.2 | 34.1 |
| 1975 | 1,404,977 | 9,928 | 261 | 7.1 | 0.2 | 26.3 |
| 1976 | 1,446,001 | 10,268 | 248 | 7.1 | 0.2 | 24.2 |
| 1977 | 1,486,816 | 10,470 | 472 | 7.0 | 0.3 | 45.1 |
| 1978 | 1,525,960 | 11,552 | 460 | 7.6 | 0.3 | 39.8 |
| 1979 | 1,565,995 | 11,568 | 355 | 7.4 | 0.2 | 30.7 |
| 1980 | 1,552,779 | 12,666 | 333 | 8.2 | 0.2 | 26.3 |
| 1981 | 1,594,451 | 11,936 | 280 | 7.5 | 0.2 | 23.5 |
| 1982 | 1,634,893 | 12,368 | 289 | 7.6 | 0.2 | 23.4 |
| 1983 | 1,676,325 | 12,406 | 256 | 7.4 | 0.2 | 20.6 |
| 1984 | 1,716,884 | 12,560 | 237 | 7.3 | 0.1 | 18.9 |
| 1985 | 1,760,132 | 12,483 | 332 | 7.1 | 0.2 | 26.6 |
| 1986 | 1,803,579 | 11,921 | 364 | 6.6 | 0.2 | 30.5 |
| 1987 | 1,848,111 | 13,644 | 260 | 7.4 | 0.1 | 19.1 |
| 1988 | 1,894,131 | 14,613 | 389 | 7.7 | 0.2 | 26.6 |
| 1989 | 1,938,794 | 14,343 | 320 | 7.4 | 0.2 | 22.3 |
| 1990 | 1,987,056 | 12,742 | 509 | 6.4 | 0.3 | 39.9 |
| 1991 | 1,967,675 | 12,559 | 354 | 6.4 | 0.2 | 28.2 |
| 1992 | 2,007,978 | 13,367 | 266 | 6.7 | 0.1 | 19.9 |
| 1993 | 2,043,740 | 13,372 | 248 | 6.5 | 0.1 | 18.5 |
| 1994 | 2,079,234 | 11,959 | 299 | 5.8 | 0.1 | 25.0 |
| 1995 | 2,115,020 | 12,979 | 352 | 6.1 | 0.2 | 27.1 |
| 1996 | 2,152,545 | 12,244 | 559 | 5.7 | 0.3 | 45.7 |
| 1997 | 2,188,083 | 11,866 | 396 | 5.4 | 0.2 | 33.4 |
| 1998 | 2,127,795 | 13,149 | 524 | 6.2 | 0.2 | 39.9 |
| 1999 | 2,067,507 | 14,432 | 652 | 7.0 | 0.3 | 45.2 |
| 2000 | 2,007,219 | 15,714 | 780 | 7.8 | 0.4 | 49.6 |
| 2001 | 1,946,932 | 16,997 | 909 | 8.7 | 0.5 | 53.5 |
| 2002 | 1,886,644 | 18,280 | 1,037 | 9.7 | 0.5 | 56.7 |
| 2003 | 1,826,356 | 17,034 | 1,165 | 9.3 | 0.6 | 68.4 |
| 2004 | 1,766,068 | 16,989 | 1,293 | 9.6 | 0.7 | 76.1 |
| 2005 | 1,743,780 | 15,732 | 1,445 | 9.0 | 0.8 | 91.9 |
| 2006 | 1,719,536 | 15,825 | 1,480 | 9.2 | 0.9 | 93.5 |
| 2007 | 1,733,404 | 16,824 | 1,558 | 9.7 | 0.9 | 92.6 |
| 2008 | 1,747,383 | 17,950 | 1,026 | 10.3 | 0.6 | 57.2 |
| 2009 | 1,761,474 | 20,209 | 1,555 | 11.5 | 0.9 | 76.9 |
| 2010 | 1,775,680 | 18,289 | 1,453 | 10.3 | 0.8 | 79.4 |
| 2011 | 1,786,229 | 16,619 | 1,469 | 9.3 | 0.8 | 88.4 |
| 2012 | 1,807,126 | 17,169 | 1,328 | 9.5 | 0.7 | 77.3 |
| 2013 | 1,818,119 | 14,664 | 1,040 | 8.1 | 0.6 | 70.9 |
| 2014 | 1,812,788 | 16,239 | 1,243 | 9.0 | 0.7 | 76.5 |
| 2015 | 1,788,274 | 16,274 | 1,268 | 9.1 | 0.7 | 77.9 |
| 2016 | 1,777,568 | 16,051 | 1,110 | 9.0 | 0.6 | 69.2 |
| 2017 | 1,791,019 | 17,112 | 1,072 | 9.6 | 0.6 | 62.6 |
| 2018 | 1,797,086 | 16,871 | 999 | 9.4 | 0.6 | 59.2 |
| 2019 | 1,788,891 | | | | | |

== Administrative divisions ==
Kosovo is administratively subdivided into seven districts, and 38 municipalities. Based on the current estimated population, Kosovo ranks as the 150th most populous country in the world.

| Rank | Name | | | Population (2024) | Area (km^{2}) | Density | Number of settlements |
| Rank | English (most common) | Albanian | Serbian | Population (2024) | Area (km^{2}) | Density | Number of settlements |
|---|---|---|---|---|---|---|---|
| Prishtina District | | | | 511,307 | 2,470 | 207.0 | 298 |
| 1 | Prishtina | Prishtinë | Priština | 227,466 | 572 | 397.7 | 41 |
| 7 | Podujevë | Podujevë/Besianë | Podujevo | 70,975 | 663 | 107.1 | 76 |
| 11 | Drenas | Drenas | Glogovac | 48,079 | 290 | 165.8 | 37 |
| 12 | Lipjan | Lipjan | Lipljan | 55,044 | 422 | 130.4 | 70 |
| 21 | Kosovo Polje | Fushë Kosovë | Kosovo Polje | 63,949 | 83 | 770.5 | 15 |
| 26 | Obiliq | Obiliq/Kastriot | Obilić | 22,815 | 105 | 217.3 | 19 |
| 30 | Gračanica | Graçanicë | Gračanica | 18,486 | 131 | 141.1 | 16 |
| 33 | Novo Brdo | Novobërdë/Artanë | Novo Brdo | 4,493 | 204 | 22.0 | 24 |
| Prizren District | | | | 271,386 | 1,397 | 194.3 | 195 |
| 2 | Prizren | Prizren | Prizren | 147,246 | 626 | 235.2 | 74 |
| 10 | Suva Reka | Suharekë/Therandë | Suva Reka | 45,749 | 306 | 149.5 | 42 |
| 14 | Malisheva | Malishevë | Mališevo | 43,888 | 361 | 121.6 | 43 |
| 22 | Dragash | Dragash/Sharr | Dragaš | 28,896 | 435 | 66.4 | 35 |
| 35 | Mamusha | Mamushë | Mamuša | 5,607 | 11 | 509.7 | – |
| Ferizaj District | | | | 180,583 | 1,030 | 175.3 | 12 |
| 3 | Ferizaj | Ferizaj | Uroševac | 109,255 | 345 | 316.7 | 45 |
| 23 | Kaçanik | Kaçanik | Kačanik | 27,716 | 221 | 125.4 | 31 |
| 25 | Shtime | Shtime | Štimlje | 24,308 | 134 | 181.4 | 23 |
| 31 | Hani i Elezit | Hani i Elezit | Đeneral Janković/Elez Han | 8,533 | 83 | 102.8 | 11 |
| 32 | Štrpce | Shtërpcë | Štrpce | 10,771 | 247 | 43.6 | 16 |
| Peja District | | | | 146,256 | 1,365 | 107.1 | 118 |
| 4 | Peja | Pejë | Peć | 82,745 | 603 | 137.2 | 14 |
| 17 | Istog | Istog | Istok | 33,008 | 454 | 72.7 | 50 |
| 19 | Klina | Klinë | Klina | 30,503 | 308 | 99.0 | 54 |
| Gjakova District | | | | 152,216 | 1,129 | 134.8 | 170 |
| 5 | Gjakova | Gjakovë | Đakovica | 78,699 | 587 | 134.1 | 91 |
| 13 | Rahovec | Rahovec | Orahovac | 41,799 | 276 | 151.4 | 32 |
| 18 | Deçan | Deçan | Dečani | 27,775 | 180 | 154.3 | 37 |
| 34 | Junik | Junik | Junik | 3,943 | 86 | 45.8 | 10 |
| Mitrovica District | | | | 173,642 | 2,077 | 83.6 | 267 |
| 8 | Mitrovica | Mitrovicë | Mitrovica | 64,742 | 350 | 185.0 | 45 |
| 9 | Vushtrri | Vushtrri | Vučitrn | 61,528 | 344 | 178.9 | 67 |
| 15 | Skenderaj | Skënderaj | Srbica | 40,664 | 378 | 107.6 | 49 |
| 24 | North Mitrovica | Mitrovicë Veriore | Severna Mitrovica | 2,326 | 11 | 211.5 | – |
| 27 | Leposavić | Leposaviq/Albanik | Leposavić | 3,185 | 539 | 5.9 | 42 |
| 28 | Zvečan | Zveçan | Zvečan | 434 | 122 | 3.6 | 35 |
| 29 | Zubin Potok | Zubin Potok | Zubin Potok | 763 | 333 | 2.3 | 29 |
| Gjilan District | | | | 150,176 | 1,206 | 124.5 | 287 |
| 6 | Gjilan | Gjilan | Gnjilane | 82,980 | 385 | 215.5 | 54 |
| 16 | Viti | Viti | Vitina | 35,566 | 278 | 127.9 | 39 |
| 20 | Kamenica | Kamenicë/Dardanë | Kamenica | 22,868 | 423 | 54.1 | 58 |
| 36 | Ranilug | Ranillug | Ranilug | 2,481 | 78 | 31.8 | 18 |
| 37 | Klokot | Kllokot | Klokot | 3,041 | 24 | 126.7 | 4 |
| 38 | Parteš | Partesh | Parteš | 3,240 | 18 | 180.0 | 3 |
| Kosovo | | | | 1,585,566 | 10,908 | 145.4 | 1,339 |

== Ethnic groups ==
The official results of the censuses in Kosovo after World War II are tabulated below. The figures for Albanians in the 1991 census were estimates only, since that census was boycotted by most Albanians. Similarly, the figures for Serbs in the 2011 census omit those in North Mitrovica, Leposavić, Zubin Potok and Zvečan (North Kosovo), while the number of Serbs and Romani in the rest of Kosovo is also deemed unreliable, due to the partial boycott.

| Ethnic group | 1948 census | | 1953 census | | 1961 census | | 1971 census | | 1981 census | | 1991 census | | 2011 census | | 2024 census | |
| Ethnic group | Number | % | Number | % | Number | % | Number | % | Number | % | Number | % | Number | % | Number | % |
|---|---|---|---|---|---|---|---|---|---|---|---|---|---|---|---|---|
| Albanians | 498,244 | 68.5 | 524,559 | 64.9 | 646,605 | 67.1 | 916,168 | 73.7 | 1,226,736 | 77.4 | 1,596,072 | 81.6 | 1,616,869 | 92.9 | 1,454,963 | 91.7 |
| Serbs | 171,911 | 23.6 | 189,869 | 23.5 | 227,016 | 23.5 | 228,264 | 18.4 | 209,498 | 13.2 | 194,190 | 9.9 | 25,532 | 1.5 | 36,652 | 2.3 |
| Montenegrins | 28,050 | 3.9 | 31,343 | 3.9 | 37,588 | 3.9 | 31,555 | 2.5 | 27,028 | 1.7 | 20,365 | 1.1 | | | | |
| ethnic Muslims | 9,679 | 1.3 | 6,241 | 0.8 | 8,026 | 0.8 | 26,357 | 2.1 | 58,562 | 3.7 | 66,189 | 3.4 | | | | |
| Bosniaks | 9,679 | 1.3 | 6,241 | 0.8 | 8,026 | 0.8 | 26,357 | 2.1 | 58,562 | 3.7 | 66,189 | 3.4 | 27,533 | 1.6 | 26,841 | 1.7 |
| Gorani | 9,679 | 1.3 | 6,241 | 0.8 | 8,026 | 0.8 | 26,357 | 2.1 | 58,562 | 3.7 | 66,189 | 3.4 | 10,265 | 0.6 | 9,140 | 0.6 |
| Croats | 5,290 | 0.7 | 6,201 | 0.8 | 7,251 | 0.8 | 8,264 | 0.7 | 8,718 | 0.6 | 8,062 | 0.4 | | | | |
| Yugoslavs | | | | | 5,206 | 0.5 | 920 | 0.1 | 2,676 | 0.2 | 3,457 | 0.2 | | | | |
| Romani | 11,230 | 1.5 | 11,904 | 1.5 | 3,202 | 0.3 | 14.593 | 1.2 | 34,126 | 2.2 | 45,760 | 2.3 | 8,824 | 0.5 | 8,730 | 0.5 |
| Ashkali | 11,230 | 1.5 | 11,904 | 1.5 | 3,202 | 0.3 | 14.593 | 1.2 | 34,126 | 2.2 | 45,760 | 2.3 | 15,436 | 0.9 | 16,270 | 1.0 |
| Egyptians | 11,230 | 1.5 | 11,904 | 1.5 | 3,202 | 0.3 | 14.593 | 1.2 | 34,126 | 2.2 | 45,760 | 2.3 | 11,524 | 0.6 | 10,581 | 0.6 |
| Turks | 1,315 | 0.2 | 34,583 | 4.3 | 25,764 | 2.7 | 12,244 | 1.0 | 12,513 | 0.8 | 10,445 | 0.5 | 18,738 | 1.1 | 19,419 | 1.2 |
| Macedonians | 526 | 0.1 | 972 | 0.1 | 1,142 | 0.1 | 1,048 | 0.1 | 1,056 | 0.1 | | | | | | |
| Others or unspecified | 1,577 | 0.2 | 2,469 | 0.3 | 2,188 | 0.2 | 4,280 | 0.3 | 3,454 | 0.2 | 11,656 | 0.6 | 3,264 | 0.6 | 2,051 | 0.1 |
| Total | 727,820 | | 808,141 | | 963,988 | | 1,243,693 | | 1,584,441 | | 1,956,196 | | 1,739,825 | | 1,585,566 | |

=== Ethnic groups by municipality ===
The results of the 2011 census of ethnic groups in municipalities are tabulated below.

Ethnic groups by municipality
| 2011 Census | | Albanians | | Serbs | | Turks | | Bosniaks | | Roma | | Ashkali | | Egyptians | | Goran | | Others | | Not declared | |
| Municipality | Total | Number | % | Number | % | Number | % | Number | % | Number | % | Number | % | Number | % | Number | % | Number | % | Number | % |
|---|---|---|---|---|---|---|---|---|---|---|---|---|---|---|---|---|---|---|---|---|---|
| Deçan (Deçan / Dečani) | 40,019 | 39,402 | 98.5 | 3 | 0.0 | 0 | 0.0 | 60 | 0.1 | 33 | 0.1 | 42 | 0.1 | 393 | 1.0 | 1 | 0.0 | 19 | | 66 | 0.2 |
| Dragash (Dragash / Dragaš) | 33,997 | 20,287 | 59.7 | 7 | 0.0 | 202 | 0.6 | 4,100 | 12.1 | 3 | 0.0 | 4 | 0.0 | 3 | 0.0 | 8,957 | 26.3 | 283 | 0.8 | 151 | 0.4 |
| Ferizaj (Ferizaj / Uroševac) | 108,610 | 104,152 | 95.9 | 32 | 0.0 | 55 | 0.1 | 83 | 0.1 | 204 | 0.2 | 3,629 | 3.3 | 24 | 0.0 | 64 | 0.1 | 102 | 0.1 | 265 | 0.2 |
| Gjakova (Gjakova / Đakovica) | 94,556 | 87,672 | 97.4 | 17 | 0.0 | 16 | 0.0 | 73 | 0.1 | 738 | 0.8 | 613 | 0.6 | 5,177 | 5.5 | 13 | 0.0 | 92 | 0.1 | 205 | 0.2 |
| Gjilan (Gjilan / Gnjilane) | 90,178 | 87,814 | 97.4 | 624 | 0.7 | 978 | 1.1 | 121 | 0.1 | 361 | 0.4 | 15 | 0.0 | 1 | 0.0 | 69 | 0.1 | 95 | 0.1 | 100 | 0.1 |
| Glogovac (Gllogoc/Drenas / Glogovac) | 58,531 | 58,445 | 99.9 | 2 | 0.0 | 5 | 0.0 | 14 | 0.0 | 0 | 0.0 | 0 | 0.0 | 3 | 0.0 | 0 | 0.0 | 22 | 0.0 | 41 | 0.1 |
| Gračanica (Graçanica / Gračanica) | 10,675 | 2,474 | 23.2 | 7,209 | 67.7 | 15 | 0.1 | 15 | 0.1 | 745 | 7.0 | 104 | 1.0 | 3 | 0.0 | 3 | 0.0 | 45 | 0.4 | 43 | 0.4 |
| Kosovo Polje (Fushë Kosovë / Kosovo Polje) | 34,827 | 30,275 | 86.9 | 321 | 0.9 | 62 | 0.2 | 34 | 0.1 | 436 | 0.3 | 3,230 | 9.3 | 282 | 0.3 | 15 | 0.0 | 131 | 0.4 | 41 | 0.1 |
| Hani i Elezit (Elez Han) | 9,403 | 9,357 | 99.5 | 0 | 0.0 | 0 | 0.0 | 42 | 0.4 | 0 | 0.0 | 0 | 0.0 | 0 | 0.0 | 0 | 0.0 | 2 | 0.0 | 2 | 0.0 |
| Istog(Istok) | 39,289 | 36,154 | 92.0 | 194 | 0.5 | 10 | 0.0 | 1,142 | 2.9 | 39 | 0.1 | 111 | 0.3 | 1,544 | 3.9 | 0 | 0.0 | 45 | 0.1 | 50 | 0.1 |
| Junik | 6,084 | 6,069 | 99.8 | 0 | 0.0 | 0 | 0.0 | 0 | 0.0 | 0 | 0.0 | 0 | 0.0 | 0 | 0.0 | 0 | 0.0 | 4 | 0.0 | 11 | 0.2 |
| Kaçanik (Kačanik) | 33,409 | 33,362 | 99.9 | 1 | 0.0 | 2 | 0.0 | 20 | 0.1 | 5 | 0.0 | 1 | 0.0 | 0 | 0.0 | 0 | 0.0 | 7 | 0.0 | 11 | 0.0 |
| Kamenica (K. Kamenica) | 36,085 | 34,186 | 94.7 | 1,554 | 4.3 | 5 | 0.0 | 9 | 0.0 | 240 | 0.7 | 0 | 0.0 | 0 | 0.0 | 29 | 0.1 | 27 | 0.1 | 35 | 0.1 |
| Klina | 38,496 | 37,216 | 96.7 | 98 | 0.3 | 3 | 0.0 | 20 | 0.1 | 78 | 0.2 | 85 | 0.2 | 934 | 2.4 | 0 | 0.0 | 23 | 0.1 | 39 | 0.1 |
| Klokot (Kllokot / Klokot) | 2,556 | 1,362 | 53.3 | 1,177 | 46.0 | 1 | 0.0 | 0 | 0.0 | 9 | 0.4 | 0 | 0.0 | 0 | 0.0 | 6 | 0.2 | 1 | 0.0 | 0 | 0.0 |
| Leposavić (Leposaviq / Leposavić) (Note: Due to the boycott of the 2011 census by most municipalities in the Serb-inhabited north (see North Kosovo), the real number of the population of Leposavić, North Mitrovica, Zubin Potok and Zvečan is unknown. Estimates are taken according to a 2014 OSCE report.) | 18,700 | 300 | 1.6 | 18,000 | 96.3 | 0 | 0.0 | 0 | 0.0 | 0 | 0.0 | 0 | 0.0 | 0 | 0 | 0.0 | 0.0 | 400 | 2.1 | 0 | 0.0 |
| Lipjan (Lipljan) | 57,605 | 54,467 | 94.6 | 513 | 0.9 | 128 | 0.2 | 42 | 0.1 | 342 | 0.6 | 1,812 | 3.1 | 4 | 0.0 | 6 | 0.0 | 260 | 0.5 | 31 | 0.1 |
| Mališevo (Malisheva / Mališevo) | 54,613 | 54,501 | 99.9 | 0 | 0.0 | 0 | 0.0 | 15 | 0.0 | 26 | 0.0 | 5 | 0.0 | 0 | 0.0 | 0 | 0.0 | 8 | 0.0 | 58 | 0.1 |
| Mamuša (Mamusha / Mamuša) | 5,507 | 327 | 5.9 | 0 | 0.0 | 5,182 | 93.2 | 1 | 0.0 | 39 | 0.7 | 12 | 0.2 | 0 | 0.0 | 0 | 0.0 | 0 | 0.0 | 0 | 0.0 |
| Mitrovica, Kosovo (Mitrovicë / K. Mitrovica) | 71,909 | 69,497 | 96.6 | 14 | 0.0 | 518 | 0.7 | 416 | 0.6 | 528 | 0.7 | 647 | 0.9 | 6 | 0.0 | 23 | 0.0 | 47 | 0.1 | 213 | 0.3 |
| North Mitrovica | 29,460 | 4,900 | 16.6 | 22,530 | 76.5 | 210 | 0.7 | 1,000 | 3.4 | 200 | 0.7 | 40 | 0.1 | 0 | 0.0 | 580 | 2.0 | 0 | 0.0 | 0 | 0.0 |
| Novo Brdo (Novobërdë / Novo Brdo) | 6,729 | 3,524 | 52.4 | 3,122 | 46.4 | 7 | 0.1 | 5 | 0.1 | 63 | 0.9 | 3 | 0.0 | 0 | 0.0 | 0 | 0.0 | 2 | 0.0 | 3 | 0.0 |
| Obiliq(Obiliq/Kastriot / Obilić) | 21,549 | 19,854 | 92.1 | 276 | 1.3 | 2 | 0.0 | 58 | 0.3 | 661 | 3.1 | 578 | 2.7 | 27 | 0.1 | 5 | 0.0 | 48 | 0.2 | 40 | 0.2 |
| Parteš (Partesh / Parteš) | 1,787 | 0 | 0.0 | 1,785 | 99.9 | 0 | 0.0 | 0 | 0.0 | 0 | 0.0 | 0 | 0.0 | 0 | 0.0 | 0 | 0.0 | 2 | 0.1 | 0 | 0.0 |
| Peja (Peja / Peć) | 96,450 | 87,975 | 91.2 | 332 | 0.3 | 59 | 0.1 | 3,786 | 3.9 | 993 | 1.0 | 143 | 0.1 | 2,700 | 2.8 | 189 | 0.2 | 132 | 0.1 | 141 | 0.1 |
| Podujevo (Besiane / Podujevo) | 88,499 | 87,523 | 98.9 | 0 | 0.0 | 5 | 0.0 | 33 | 0.0 | 74 | 0.1 | 680 | 0.8 | 2 | 0.0 | 0 | 0.0 | 43 | 0.0 | 127 | 0.1 |
| Pristina (Prishtina / Priština) | 198,897 | 194,452 | 97.8 | 430 | 0.2 | 2,156 | 1.1 | 400 | 0.2 | 56 | 0.0 | 557 | 0.3 | 8 | 0.0 | 205 | 0.1 | 334 | 0.2 | 299 | 0.2 |
| Prizren | 177,781 | 145,718 | 82.0 | 237 | 0.1 | 9,091 | 5.1 | 16,869 | 9.5 | 2,899 | 1.6 | 1,350 | 0.8 | 168 | 0.1 | 655 | 0.4 | 386 | 0.2 | 381 | 0.2 |
| Rahovec (Orahovac) | 56,208 | 55,166 | 98.1 | 134 | 0.2 | 0.2 | 0.0 | 10 | 0.0 | 84 | 0.1 | 404 | 0.7 | 299 | 0.5 | 0 | 0.0 | 11 | 0.0 | 98 | 0.2 |
| Ranilug (Ranilug) | 3,866 | 164 | 4.2 | 3,692 | 95.5 | 0 | 0.0 | 1 | 0.0 | 0 | 0.0 | 0 | 0.0 | 0 | 0.0 | 0 | 0.0 | 3 | 0.1 | 6 | 0.2 |
| Štrpce (Shtërpcë / Štrpce) | 6,949 | 3,757 | 54.1 | 3,148 | 45.3 | 0 | 0.0 | 2 | 0.0 | 24 | 0.3 | 1 | 0.0 | 0 | 0.0 | 0 | 0.0 | 7 | 0.1 | 4 | 0.1 |
| Shtime (Shtime/ Štimlje) | 27,324 | 26,447 | 96.8 | 49 | 0.2 | 1 | 0.0 | 20 | 0.1 | 23 | 0.1 | 750 | 2.7 | 0 | 0.0 | 2 | 0.0 | 13 | 0.0 | 19 | 0.1 |
| Skenderaj (Srbica) | 50,858 | 50,685 | 99.7 | 50 | 0.1 | 1 | 0.0 | 42 | 0.0 | 0 | 0.0 | 10 | 0.0 | 1 | 0.0 | 0 | 0.0 | 5 | 0.0 | 64 | 0.1 |
| Suva Reka (Suharekë / Suva Reka) | 59,722 | 59,076 | 98.9 | 2 | 0.0 | 4 | 0.0 | 15 | 0.0 | 41 | 0.1 | 493 | 0.8 | 5 | 0.0 | 0 | 0.0 | 15 | 0.0 | 71 | 0.1 |
| Vitina (Viti / Vitina) | 46,987 | 46,669 | 99.3 | 113 | 0.2 | 4 | 0.0 | 25 | 0.1 | 12 | 0.0 | 14 | 0.0 | 0 | 0.0 | 7 | 0.0 | 83 | 0.2 | 60 | 0.1 |
| Vučitrn (Vushtrri / Vučitrn) | 69,870 | 68,840 | 98.5 | 384 | 0.5 | 278 | 0.4 | 33 | 0.0 | 68 | 0.1 | 143 | 0.2 | 1 | 0.0 | 3 | 0.1 | 50 | 0.1 | 70 | 0.1 |
| Zubin Potok | 14,900 | 1,000 | 6.7 | 13,900 | 93.9 | 0 | 0.0 | 0 | 0.0 | 0 | 0.0 | 0 | 0.0 | 0 | 0.0 | 0 | 0.0 | 0 | 0.0 | 0 | 0.0 |
| Zvečan (Zveçan / Zvečan) | 16,650 | 350 | 2.1 | 16,000 | 96.1 | 0 | 0.0 | 0 | 0.0 | 0 | 0.0 | 0 | 0.0 | 0 | 0.0 | 0 | 0.0 | 0 | 0.0 | 0 | 0.0 |
| Kosovo | 1,819,604 | 1,623,419 | 90.0 | 80,000 | 4.4 | 19,002 | 1.1 | 28,506 | 1.6 | 9,024 | 0.5 | 15,476 | 0.9 | 11,585 | 0.6 | 10,826 | 0.6 | 3,052 | 0.2 | 2,752 | 0.2 |

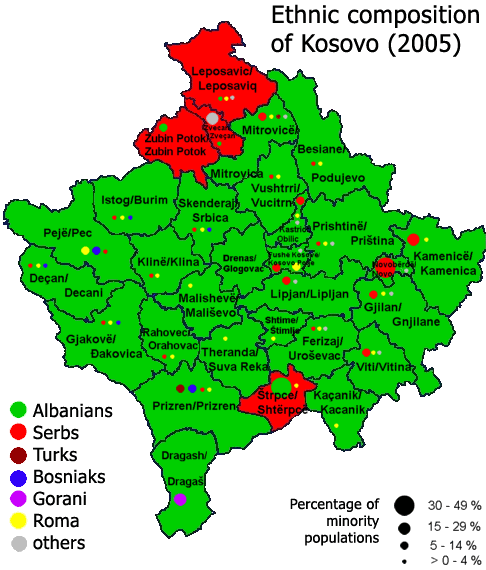
Ethnic composition of Kosovo in 2005 according to the Organization for Security and Co-operation in Europe

The 2000 Living Standard Measurement Survey by Statistical Office of Kosovo found an ethnic composition of the population as follows:

- 92% Albanians
- 8% others

A more comprehensive (October 2002) estimate (for the 1.9 million inhabitants) for these years:

- 92% Albanians
- 4% Serbs
- 4% Bosniaks, Turks, Romani and others

During the Kosovo War in 1999, around 700,000 ethnic Albanians, over 100,000 ethnic Serbs and more than 40,000 Bosniaks were forced out of Kosovo to neighbouring Albania, North Macedonia, Montenegro, Bosnia and Serbia. After the United Nations took over administration of Kosovo following the war, the vast majority of the Albanian refugees returned. The largest diaspora communities of Kosovo Albanians are in Switzerland and Austria accounting for some 200,000 individuals each, or for 20% of the population resident in Kosovo.

Many non-Albanians – chiefly Serbs and Romani – fled or were expelled, mostly to the rest of Serbia at the end of the war, with further refugee outflows occurring as the result of sporadic ethnic violence. As of 2002, the number of registered refugees was around 250,000. The non-Albanian population in Kosovo is now about half of its pre-war total. The largest concentration of Serbs in the country is in the north, but many remain in Kosovo Serb enclaves surrounded by Albanian-populated areas.

== Languages ==
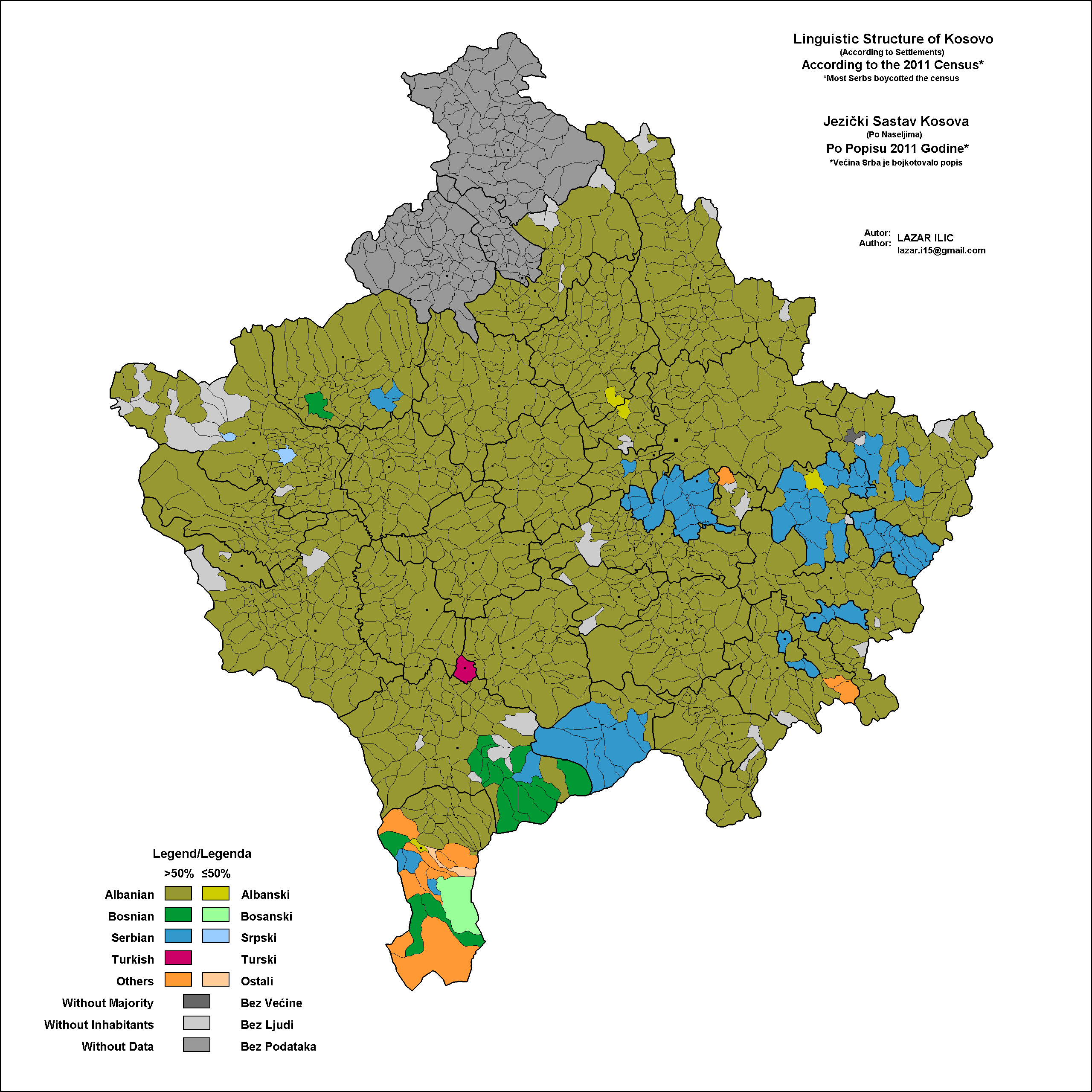
Linguistic structure according to the 2011 census

As defined by the Constitution of Kosovo, Albanian and Serbian are official languages in Kosovo. According to the 2011 census, almost 95% of the citizens speak Albanian as their native language, followed by South Slavic languages and Turkish. Due to North Kosovo's boycott of the census, Bosnian came in as the second-largest language after Albanian. However, Serbian is in reality the second-most spoken language in Kosovo.

| Language | Native speakers | % |
|---|---|---|
| Albanian | 1,644,865 | 94.5 |
| Bosnian | 28,989 | 1.7 |
| Serbian | 27,983 | 1.6 |
| Turkish | 19,568 | 1.1 |
| Romani | 5,860 | 0.3 |
| Other/Not specified | 12,560 | 0.7 |

== Health ==
Harvard Medical School and NATO published a study on the impact of the conflict on Kosovo health system in 2014. The data in the table below are from the Kosovo Agency of Statistics.

Structure of group of diseases according to ICD-10 recorded in PHC in 2010
| Group of diseases | Number | Percentage |
| Parasitic diseases | 53,762 | 28 |
| Tumors/cancers | 2,943 | 1.5 |
| Blood and homopotetic organ disease and immunity disorders | 5,091 | 2.6 |
| Endocrinic disorder of feeding and metabolism | 25,212 | 13.1 |
| Psychic and personality disorder | 13,488 | 7 |
| SQN diseases | 15,490 | 8.1 |
| Eye diseases | 21,320 | 11.1 |
| Ear and mastoid process diseases | 18,989 | 9.9 |
| Diseases of blood circulation system | 5,139 | 2.7 |
| Diseases of respiratory system | 6,962 | 3.6 |
| Diseases of digestive system | 3,192 | 1.7 |
| Dermic and hypodermic tissue diseases | 1,453 | 0.8 |
| Diseases of locomotor system and connective tissue | 1,775 | 0.9 |
| Disease of urogenital system | 2,198 | 1.1 |
| Pregnancy, delivery and maternity | 5,737 | 3 |
| Certain states resulting from perinatal periods | 200 | 0.1 |
| Inborn deformity, chromosomal deformities and anomalies | 248 | 0.1 |
| Symptoms, indications, analyses and clinical abnormal ascertainments | 1,556 | 0.8 |
| Injuries, poisoning, and other consequences caused by external factors | 2,871 | 1.5 |
| External factors of morbidity and mortality | 579 | 0.3 |
| Factors influencing on health conditions and contact with health services | 3,948 | 2.1 |
| Total | 192,154 | |

== Religion ==
The country has no official religion. The constitution establishes Kosovo as a secular state that is neutral in matters of religious beliefs and where everyone is equal before the law and freedom to belief, conscience and religion is guaranteed.

The 2011 Kosovo population census was largely boycotted by the Kosovo Serbs, especially in North Kosovo. That left the Serb population underrepresented. The International Monitoring Operation said that questions complied with international standards: respondents can declare their ethnicity and religion but are not obliged to do so. Serbs predominantly identify as Orthodox Christians. The results of the 2011 census gave the following religious affiliations for the population included in it:

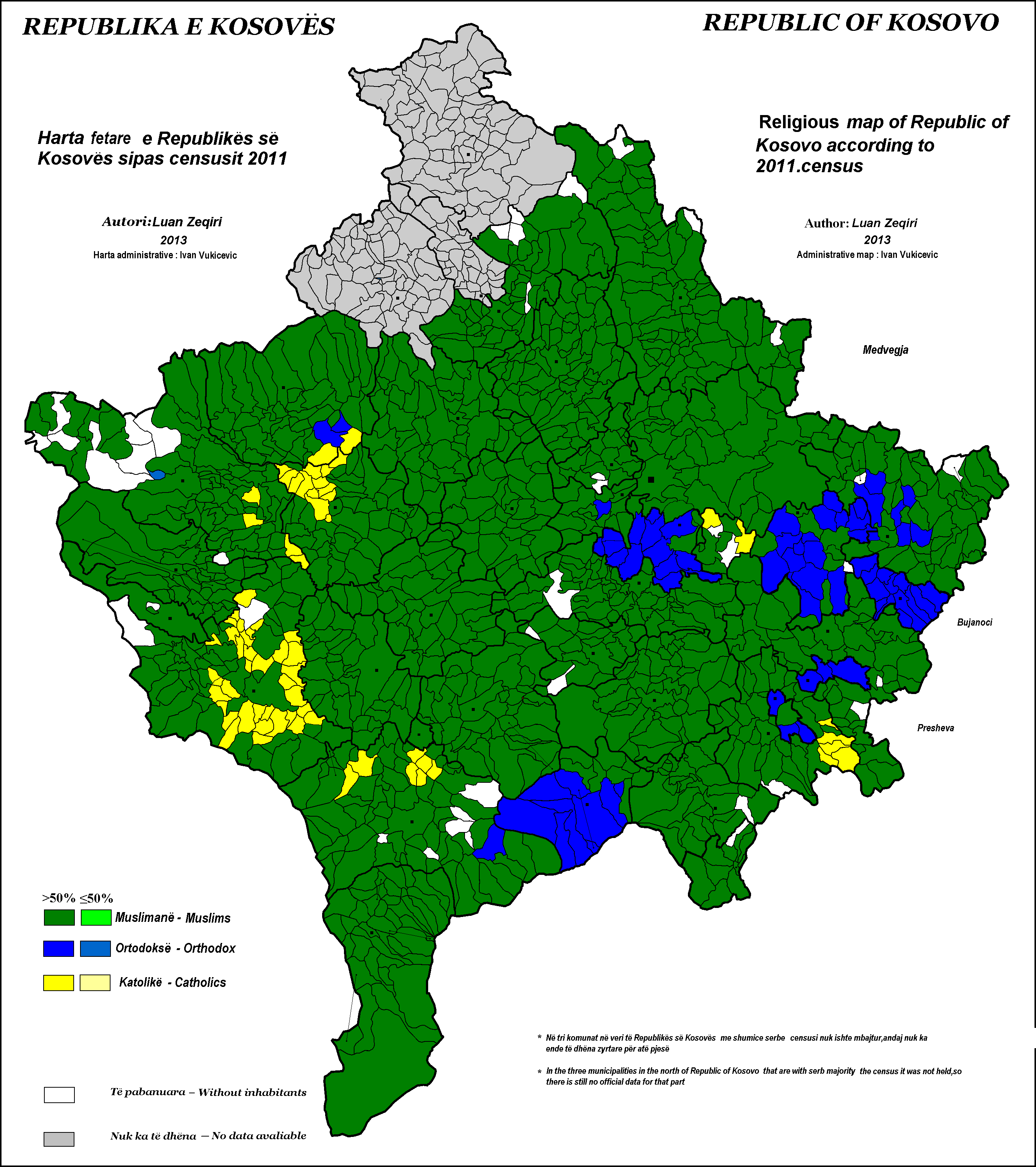
Religious map of Kosovo in 2011 by settlements. The Serb-dominated gray area in the north is presumably majority Orthodox.

2011 & 2024 Kosovo religion census (boycotted by most Serbs)
| Religion | 2011 | | 2024 | |
| Religion | Number | % | Number | % |
|---|---|---|---|---|
| Islam | 1,663,412 | 95.6% | 1,482,276 | 93.5% |
| Christianity: Catholic; Orthodox | 64,275; 38,438; 25,837 | 3.7% 2.2% 1.5% | 64,498; 27,815; 36,683 | 4.06% 1.75% 2.31% |
| Other (specify) | 1,188 | 0.1% | 7,175 | 0.45% |
| No religion | 1,242 | 0.1% | 7,899 | 0.50% |
| Not stated: Prefer not to answer; Missing | 9,708; 7,213; 2,495 | 0.6% 0.4% 0.1% | 23,718 | 1.50% |
| Total | 1,739,825 | 100% | 1,585,566 | 100% |

Most Albanians in Kosovo are Muslim. Almost all Muslims in Kosovo are Sunni. A small amount of Muslims in Kosovo practice Sufism, mainly in Western Kosovo. Most Muslims in Kosovo follow the Hanafi Madhab.

The Serb population is largely Serbian Orthodox. The Catholic Albanian communities are mostly concentrated in Gjakova, Prizren, Klina and a few villages near Peja and Viti (see laramans). Slavic-speaking Catholics usually call themselves Janjevci or Kosovan Croats. Slavic-speaking Muslims in the south of Kosovo are known as the Gorani people.

== Migration ==
According to a 2015 report by Geoba.se, Kosovo's current net migration rate is at −3.72, ranking Kosovo 197th, due to the ongoing political and economic crisis. The same source gives −0.71 for the 2023 estimate.

== Internally displaced persons ==
According to the US CIA, as of 2022, there were 16,000 internally displaced persons, primarily Serbs displaced during the Kosovo War. Also, a smaller number of Serbs, Roma, Ashkali, and Egyptians fled their homes in 2004 as a result of violence.

== See also ==
- Demographics of the Socialist Federal Republic of Yugoslavia
- Yugoslavia § Demographics
- Demographics of Albania
- Demographics of Montenegro
- Demographics of North Macedonia
- Demographics of Serbia
- Kosovo Albanians
- Bosniaks in Kosovo
- Montenegrins of Kosovo
- Serbs of Kosovo
- Turks in Kosovo
- Roma in Kosovo
- Gorani people
- Janjevci
- Ashkali and Balkan Egyptians
- History of the Jews in Kosovo
