= Güner =

Güner is a Turkish unisex given name and surname. Notable people with the name include:

== Given name ==
- Güner Ureya (born 1973), Kosovar diplomat

== Surname ==
- Agah Oktay Güner (born 1937), Turkish journalist and politician
- Aslıhan Güner (born 1984), Turkish actress
- Berkant Güner (born 1998), Turkish football player
- Çetin Güner (born 1977), Turkish-German football player
- Fuat Güner (born 1948), Turkish pop musician
- İlayda Güner (born 1999), Turkish basketball player

== See also ==
- Guner, also Romanized as Gūner, also known as Gonar, a village in Senderk Rural District, Senderk District, Minab County, Hormozgan Province, Iran
