= Gaçkë =

Village in Kosovo

- Village
- Location within Kosovo Location within Europe
- Coordinates: 42°17′43″N 21°9′3″E
- Country: Kosovo
- District: Ferizaj
- Municipality: Ferizaj

Population (2024)
  - Total: 2,311
- Time zone: UTC+1 (CET)
  - Summer (DST): UTC+2 (CEST)

Gaçkë is a village in Ferizaj Municipality, Kosovo. According to the 2024 census by the Kosovo Agency of Statistics (KAS), 2,311 people resided in Gaçkë, with Albanians constituting the majority of the population.
