= Varosh, Ferizaj =

Village in Kosovo

Varosh
- Village
- Location within Kosovo Location within Europe
- Coordinates: 42°20′32″N 21°10′35″E
- Country: Kosovo
- District: Ferizaj
- Municipality: Ferizaj

Population (2024)
  - Total: 1,941
- Time zone: UTC+1 (CET)
  - Summer (DST): UTC+2 (CEST)

Varosh is a village in Ferizaj Municipality, Kosovo. According to the Kosovo Agency of Statistics (KAS) from the 2024 census, there were 1,941 people residing in Varosh, with Albanians constituting the majority of the population.
