= List of countries and territories where Turkish is a recognized language =

Turkish most widely spoken of the Turkic languages. It is the national language of Turkey and one of two official languages of Cyprus.

The list below shows places where Turkish also has official status.

== Official at state level ==
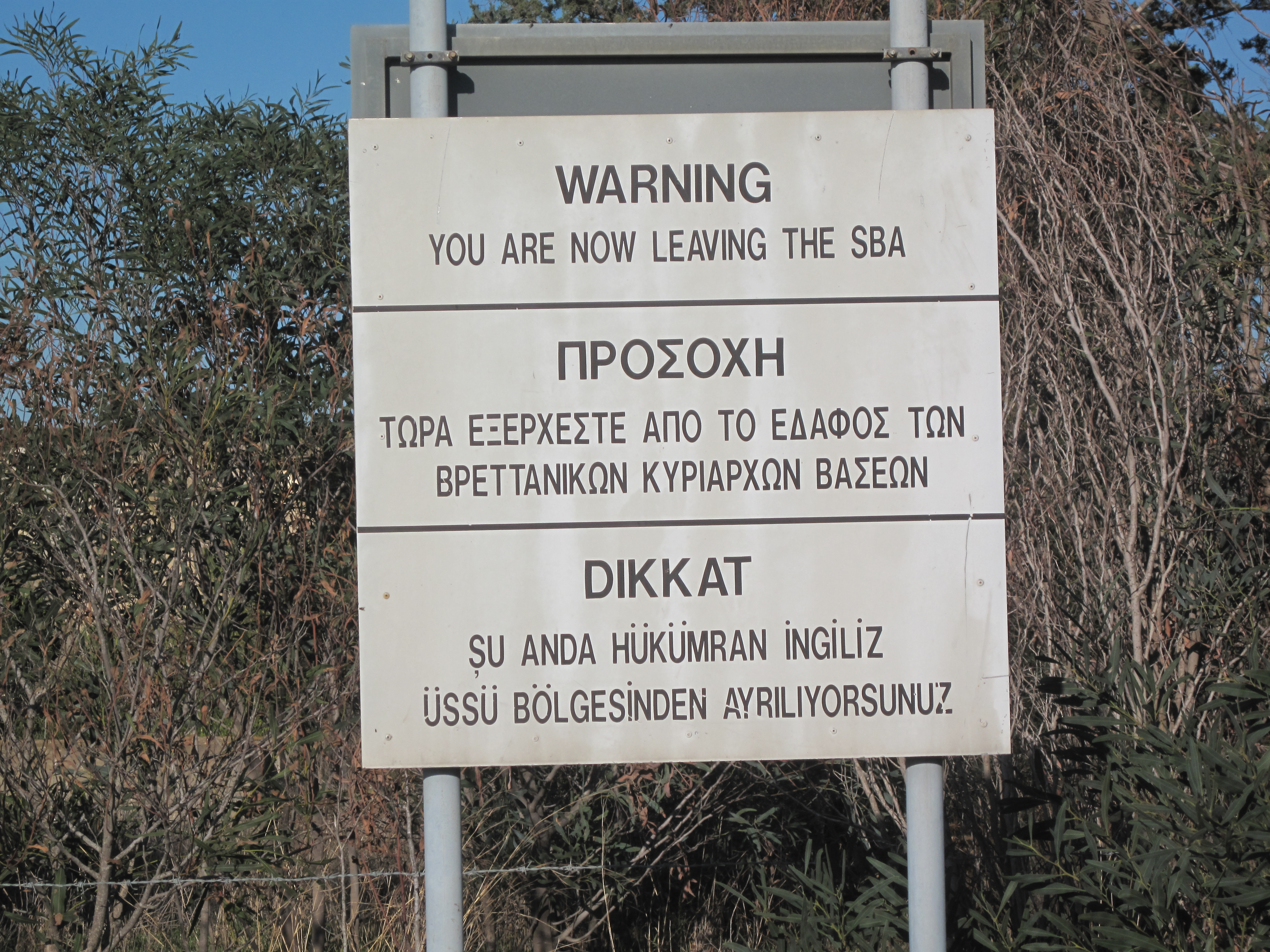
Trilingual warning board in Cyprus before leaving the Sovereign Base Areas of Akrotiri and Dhekelia: English (top), Greek (middle), Turkish (bottom)

Country	Status
Cyprus	Official language
Northern Cyprus	Official language
Turkey	Official language

== Official at regional level ==
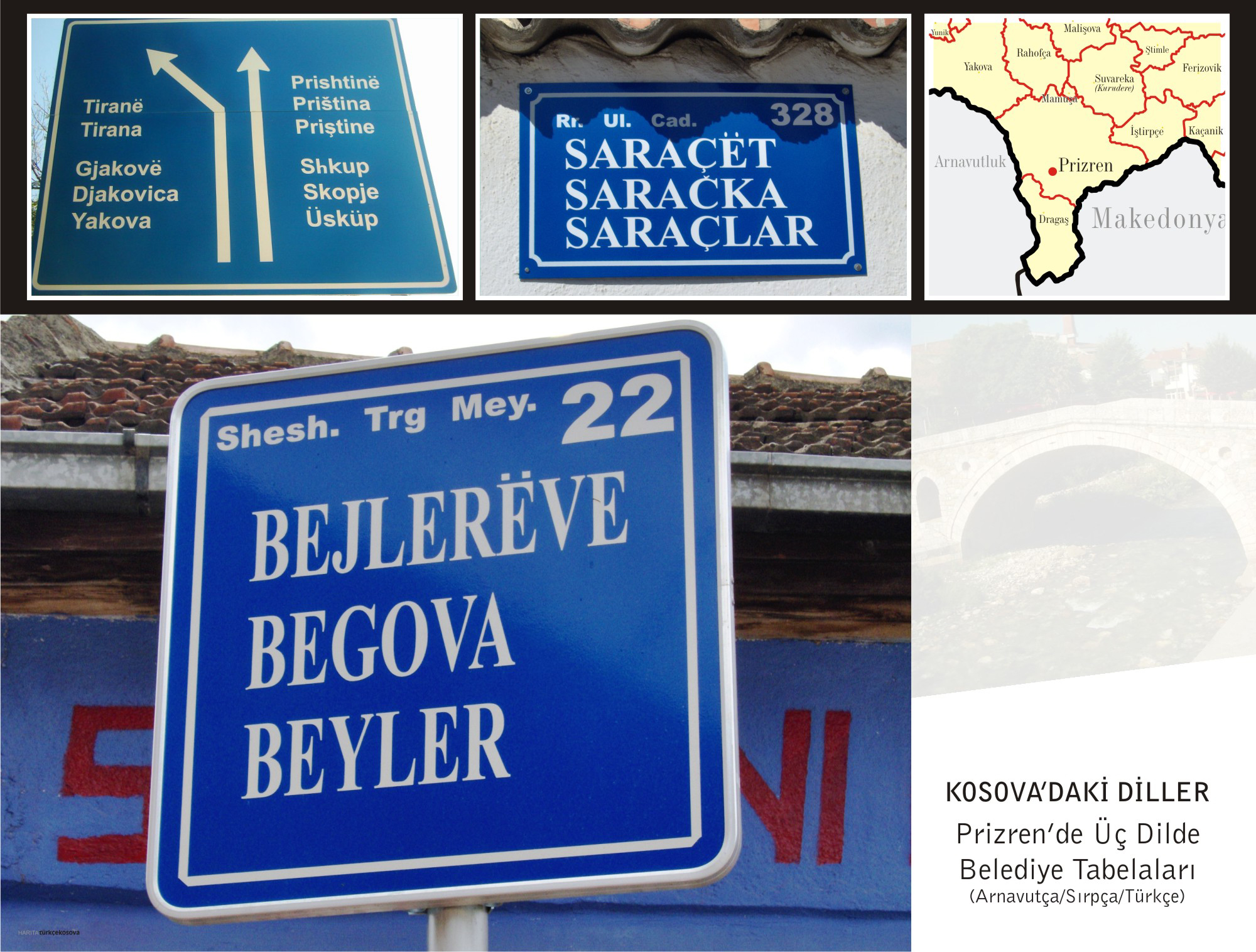
Trilingual road signs in Prizren, Kosovo: Albanian (top), Serbian (middle) and Turkish (bottom)

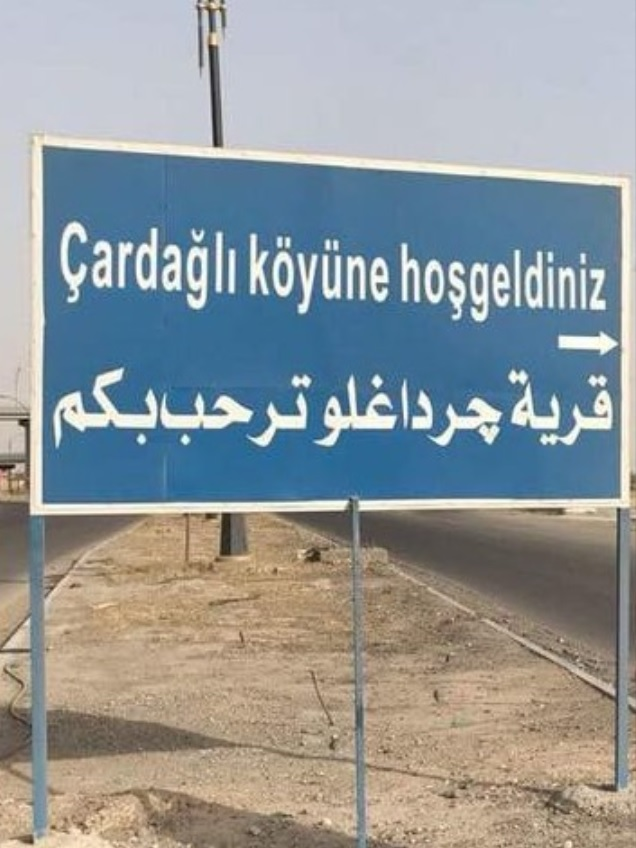
Welcome sign to the village of Çardağlı, Iraq: Turkish (top), Arabic (bottom)

Country	Status
Kosovo	Official language in: Prizren, Mamusha; In official use: Gjilan, Southern Mitrovica, Pristina, Vushtrri.
North Macedonia	Official language in: Centar Župa, Plasnica.
Iraq	Official language in: Kirkuk Governorate, Saladin Governorate; Official language in Kurdistan Region in administrative districts that are densely populated by the Iraqi Turkmens.

== Recognized as a minority language ==
Country	Status
Romania	Used in education, justice, public administration, media, economic and social life, culture, and transfrontier exchanges.
Bosnia and Herzegovina	Recognized as a minority language.

== International organizations ==
Organization	Status
Organization of Turkic States	Working language
International Organization of Turkic Culture	Working language
Parliamentary Assembly of Turkic States	Working language
