= Turks in Kosovo =

Ethnic minority group in Kosovo

Turqit në Kosovë (Albanian) Kosova'daki Türkler (Turkish)
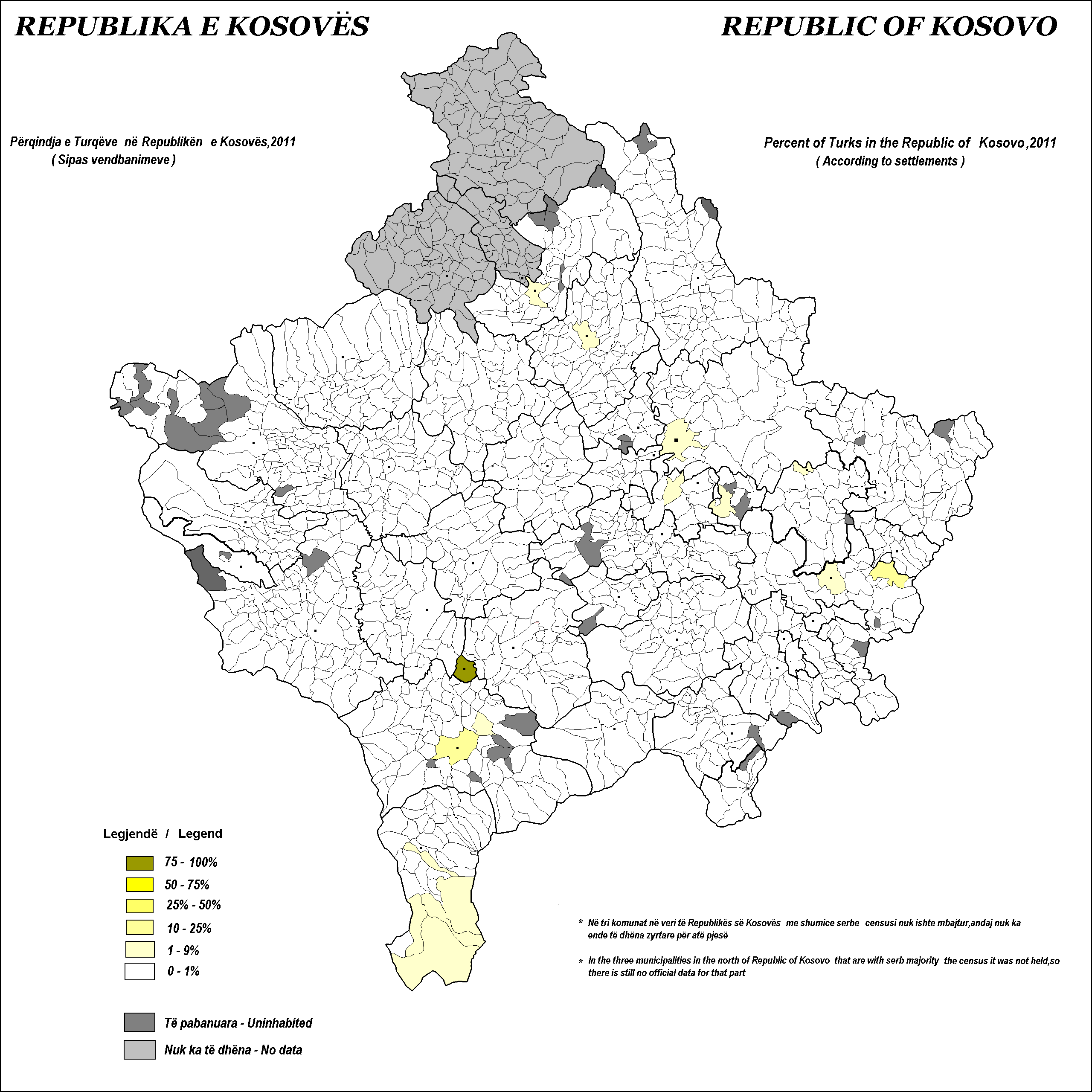

Total population
- 19,419 (2024, census)

Regions with significant populations
- Mamusha; Prizren

Languages
- Balkan Gagauz Turkish; Turkish; Albanian; Serbian

Religion
- Sunni Islam; Sufism

Related ethnic groups
- Balkan Turks, Gagauz people, Turkish people and other Turkic peoples

Turks in Kosovo (Albanian: Turqit në Kosovë), also known as Kosovo Turks or Kosovan Turks (Turkish: Kosova Türkleri; Albanian: Turqit Kosovar), are the ethnic Turks who constitute a minority group in Kosovo. Kosovo Turks make up the majority of inhabitants in Mamusha and form a considerable community in Prizren. The national Observance Day The Day of Turks has been declared annually on 23 April.

== History ==
Turkish settlement into Kosovo began in the late 14th century after the medieval Serbian state lost the Battle of Kosovo and the territory came under Ottoman rule. Although Turkish colonists began arriving in 1389–1455 when, during the Ottoman conquest, numbers of soldiers, officials, and merchants began to make their appearance in the major towns of Kosovo, the overwhelming majority of modern Turks in Kosovo are of Albanian origin.

During Ottoman rule, the cities of Prizren, Mitrovica, Vushtrri, Gjilan and Pristina experienced a widespread phenomenon where villagers settling in the cities would, upon arrival, begin adopting Turkish customs and the Turkish language. Those who settled in these urban environments, where Turkish was the language of communication with the government and the language of social prestige, opted to refer to themselves as Turks, in order to distinguish themselves from those who had not migrated to the cities and as a marker of socioeconomic status. A large number of these Turkified inhabitants still retain names alluding to their ethnic Albanian origin, usually consisting of tribal names such as Berisha, Bytyçi, Gashi, Hoti, Kastrati, Krasniqi, Kryeziu, Luma and others.

In 1912 the Ottoman Turks lost control over Kosovo and the region became a part of the Kingdoms of Serbia and Montenegro. From this point, Kosovo as a political entity was discontinued as the region was divided among new administrative units. Following the Austrian and Bulgarian occupation during World War I, Serbia and Montenegro became part of the newly created Kingdom of Serbs, Croats and Slovenes in 1918. When the Axis powers occupied Yugoslavia in 1941, the former territory of Kosovo became part of Albania, which was itself controlled by Italy. With the defeat of the Axis powers, Yugoslavia, then ruled by Communists led by Josip Broz Tito, regained control over the region. In 1946, Kosovo returned to maps when a region bearing the name Kosovo and Metohija was granted autonomous status within FPR Yugoslavia.

After the Kosovo War, a variety of non-Albanian communities, including Serbs, Roma, Bosnians, Montenegrins, and even Turks, were persecuted by elements of the Kosovo Liberation Army and other Albanian extremists. This persecution took various forms, including killings, burning of houses, destruction of churches and monasteries, as well as threats against monks and nuns.

As a result of the Turkification policies enacted by the Yugoslavian government between 1948 and 1956, the number of registered Turks in Kosovo jumped from a mere 1,313 (or 0.2% of the population) in 1948 to 34,343 (4.3% of Kosovo's population) in the 1953 census. This was partly the result of the historical connotations of the word Turk, which had been synonymous with Muslim during the Ottoman era. These self declared Turks, almost exclusively consisting of ethnic Albanians, then began to emigrate to Turkey until 1958 on the basis of a bilateral agreement between Yugoslavia and Turkey.

Turks in Kosovo according to official censuses
Year of census	Turks	% of total population
1921	27,920	6.3%
1931	23,698	4.3%
1939	24,946	3.8%
1948	1,315	0.2%
1953	34,583	4.3%
1961	25,784	2.7%
1971	12,224	1.0%
1981	12,513	0.8%
2011	18,738	1.1%
2024	19,419	1.2%

== Demographics ==
=== Population ===
In 1993, the Human Rights Watch stated that there was approximately 20,000 Kosovan Turks, constituting about 1% of Kosovo's population.

According to the 2024 national census, 19,419 citizens identified themselves as Turks, constituting 1.2% of Kosovo's total population.

=== Areas of settlement ===
The Turkish minority of Kosovo have a majority population in the municipality of Mamusha. However, the largest Turkish population in Kosovo lives in Prizren. They constitute roughly 6.6% of Prizren's population, and the town remains the historical, cultural and political centre of the Kosovan Turkish community. In the Gjilan municipality, the Turkish community resides mostly in the city and in the villages of Livoç i Epërm and Dobërçan, constituting between 0.9% of the total population of the municipality. Kosovan Turks living in Mitrovica amount to roughly 0.4% of its total population; in the southern part of the town, Kosovan Turks live scattered in the city, while those who live in northern region reside in the "Bosniak Mahalla" neighbourhood. In Vushtrri Turks constitute about 0.37% of the total population, and live scattered throughout the urban areas. In the Pristina region together with Turkish speaking Muslim Roma the Divanjoldjije Group, they are concentrated in the urban areas of the city, and constitute roughly 0.9% of the total municipal population, and in the rural settlements of Janjevo and Banullë in the Lipjan municipality, where they amount to 0.27% of the population.

According to the 2024 national census by the Kosovo Agency of Statistics, the Turkish population in Kosovo is (Turkish majority in bold):

Municipality	Turks (2024 Census)	% Turkish
Prizren	9,819	6.66%
**Mamusha**	**5,220**	**93.09%**
Pristina	2,138	0.93%
Gjilan	745	0.89%
Dragash	354	1.22%
Mitrovicë	257	0.39%
Vushtrri	230	0.37%
Fushë Kosovë	195	0.3%
Lipjan	153	0.27%
Other municipalities	308	%
Total	19,419	1.22%

== Politics ==
There are three Turkish political parties in Kosovo:

- Turkish Public Front–under the leadership of Sezai Saipi
- Turkish Democratic Union–under the leadership of Erhan Köroğlu, centred in Pristina
- Turkish Democratic Party of Kosovo (KTDP)–under the leadership of Mahir Yağcılar, centred in Prizren (the only registered Turkish party of Kosovo)

== Notable Kosovo Turks ==
- Gülsha Adilji, Swiss TV presenter (Turkish-Kosovar mother)
- Mazhar Apa, businessman
- Cemil Arıcan, politician
- Tevfik Nazif Arıcan, politician
- Necmi Rıza Ayça, cartoonist
- Enver Baki, writer
- Mehmet Faik Baysal, politician
- Zeynel Beksaç, writer, poet and short story writer
- Aşık Çelebi, biographer, poet, and translator
- Prizrenli Suzi Çelebi, poet and historiographer
- Hacı Ömer Lütfü Efendi, poet and writer
- Cafer Tayyar Eğilmez, officer of the Ottoman Army and a general of the Turkish Army
- Melih Gökçek, mayor of Ankara (1994–2017)
- Nimetullah Hafız, literary scholar and Turcologist
- Suzan Kardeş, singer and actress
- Hikmet Kıvılcımlı, communist leader, theoretician, writer, publicist, and translator
- Abdurrahman Şeref Laç, politician
- Hasan Mercan, poet and writer
- Gani Müjde, writer, cartoonist, screenwriter, director and presenter
- Ahmet Samim, journalist and liberal politician; founding member of the Liberty Party
- Kenan Sipahi, basketball player
- Ali Haydar Şen, businessman
- Yahya Kemal Beyatlı, Turkish poet and author, as well as a politician and diplomat
- İsmet Tavgaç, politician
- Ekrem Behçet Tezel, politician
- Razi Trak, former president of Fenerbahçe S.K.
- Güner Ureya, first Ambassador of the Republic of Kosovo to the People's Republic of Bangladesh
- Nusret Dişo Ülkü, writer, poet and short story writer
- Vehbi Varlık, businessman
- Mahir Yağcılar, President of the Turkish Democratic Party of Kosovo

== Ottoman architecture ==
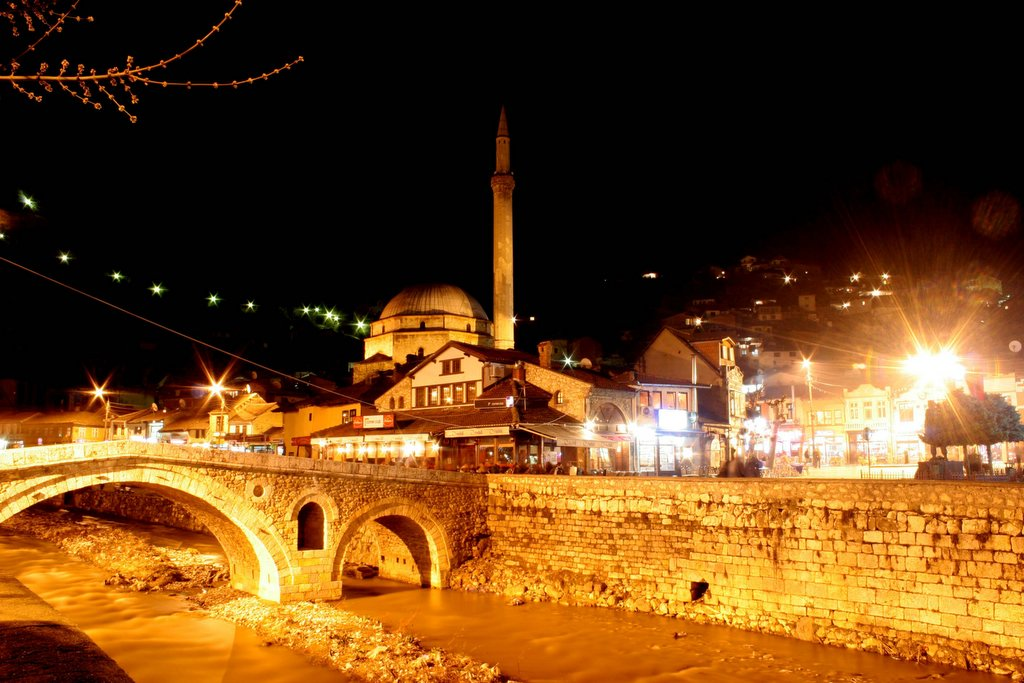
Ottoman mosque, Prizren

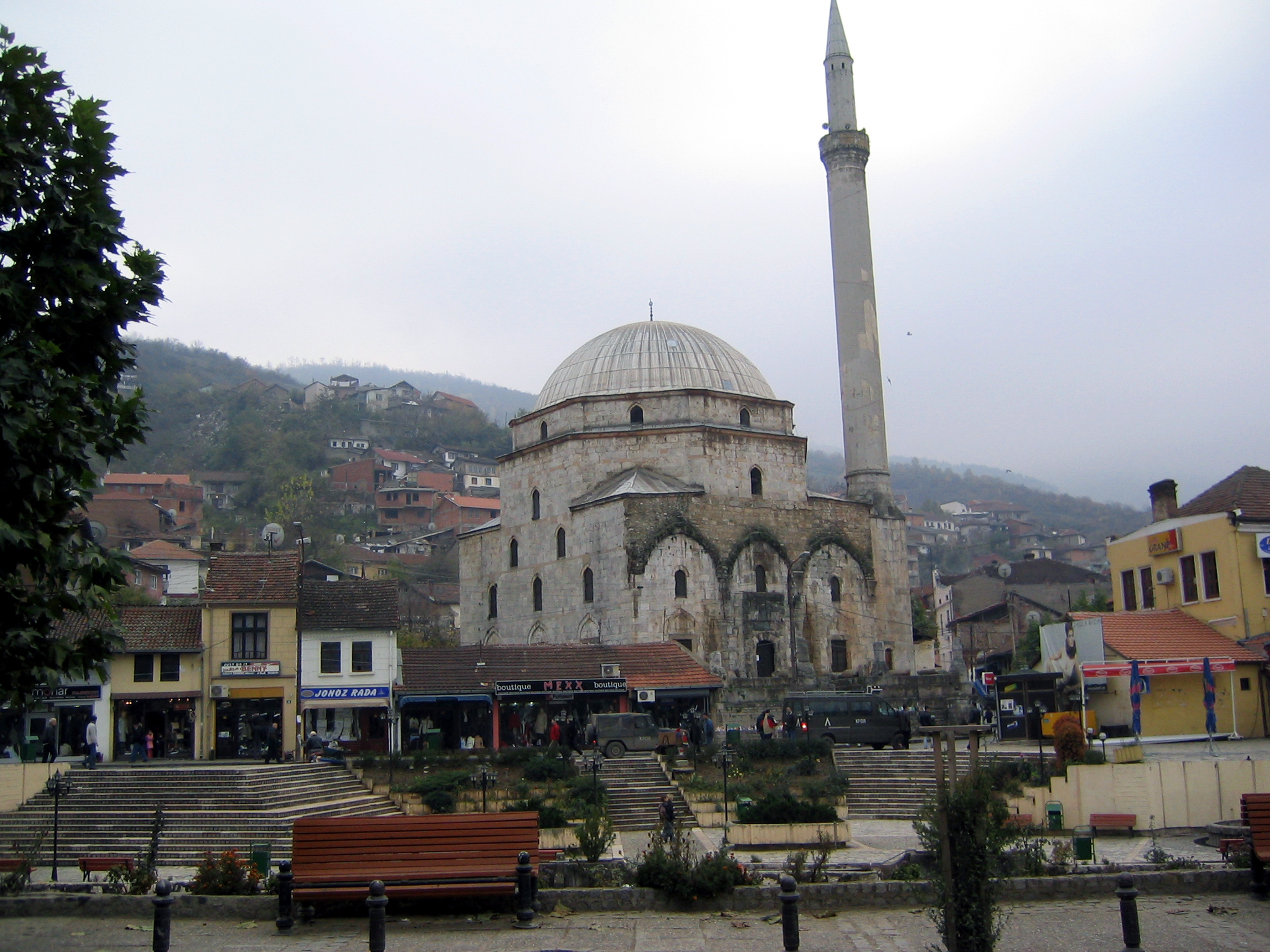
An Ottoman mosque in Prizren

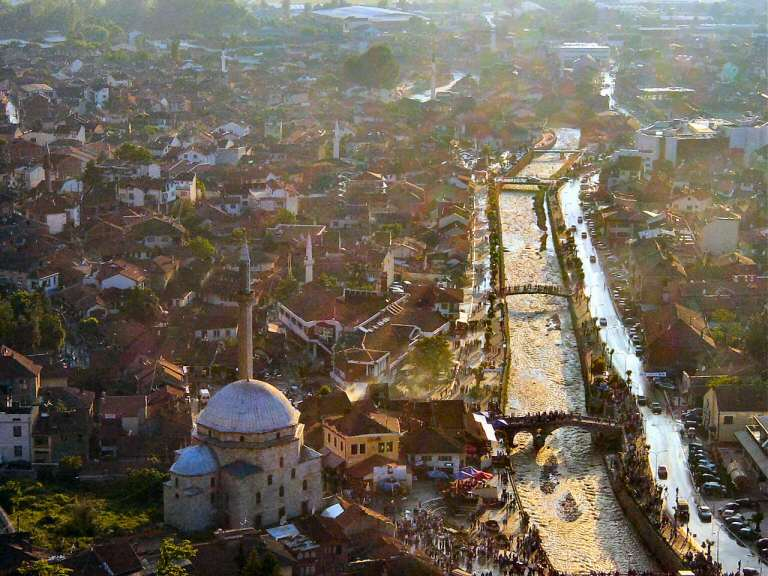
Prizren

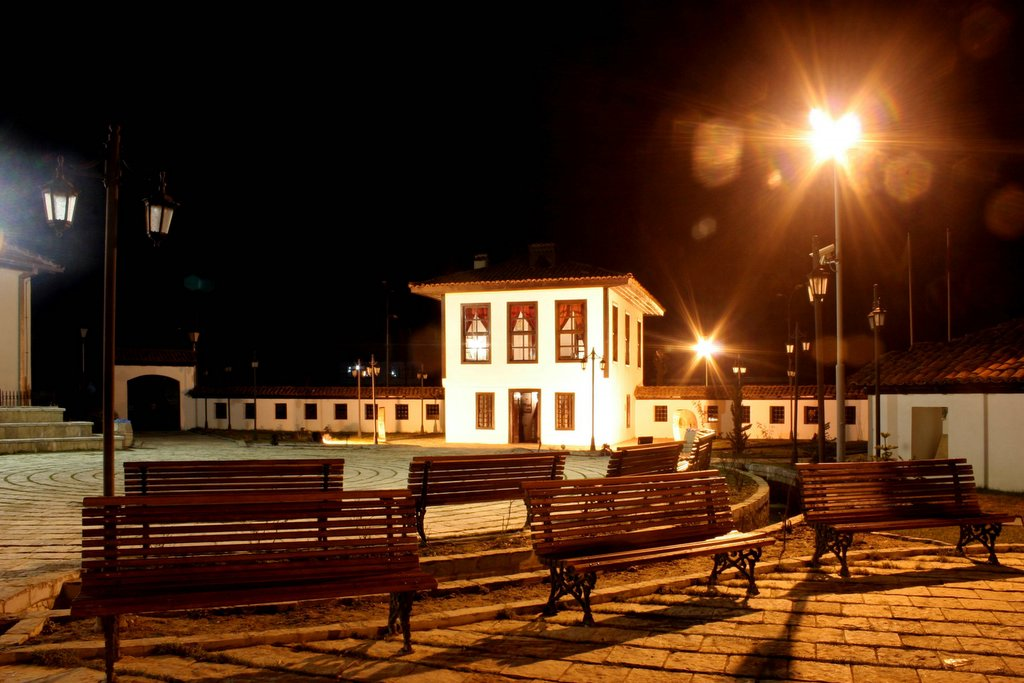
League of Prizren building in Prizren

See also the Mosque of Muderis Ali Efendi

== See also ==
- Turkish minorities in the former Ottoman Empire
  - Turks in the Balkans
- Mamusha
- Kosovo–Turkey relations
- Turkification

== Bibliography ==
- Baltic, Nina (2007), Theory and Practice of Human and Minority Rights under the Yugoslav Communist System (PDF), MIRICO: Human and Minority Rights in the Life Cycle of Ethnic Conflicts.
- Cole, Jeffrey (2011), Ethnic Groups of Europe: An Encyclopedia, ABC-CLIO, ISBN 978-1-59884-302-6.
- Elsie, Robert (2010), Historical Dictionary of Kosovo, Scarecrow Press, ISBN 978-0-8108-7231-8.
- European Centre for minority Issues Kosovo (2012), Minority Communities in the 2011 Kosovo Census Results: Analysis and Recommendations (PDF), European Centre for minority Issues Kosovo, archived from the original (PDF) on 2014-01-03.
- Human Rights Watch (1993), Open Wounds: Human Rights Abuses in Kosovo, Human Rights Watch, ISBN 1-56432-131-2.
- Mertus, Julie (1999), Kosovo: How Myths and Truths Started a War, University of California Press, ISBN 0-520-21865-5.
- O'Neill, William G. (2002), Kosovo: An Unfinished Peace, Lynne Rienner Publishers, ISBN 1-58826-021-6.
- OSCE (2010), "Community Profile: Kosovo Turks", Kosovo Communities Profile, Organization for Security and Co-operation in Europe.
