= Shaip Zurnaxhiu =

Shaip Zurnaxhiu (born 1884 in Mamushë and died 1951 in Rahovec) was an Albanian author and Bejtexhi. Zurnaxhiu is the author of seventeen poems in Albanian, twenty in Turkish and five in Serbo-Croatian, all written in the Arabic alphabet. His poetry, with a good emotional charge and in an Albanian slightly mixed with oriental vocabulary, includes religious themes and love lyrics. He was a student of Sheh Mala from the Malamatiyya Tariqa.

== Legacy ==
A street in Prizren bears his name.
