= Montenegrins of Kosovo =

Црногорци на Косову
- The location of Kosovo in Europe

Languages
- Serbian

Religion
- Eastern Orthodox

Related ethnic groups
- Kosovo Serbs

Montenegrins are a South Slavic people who are primarily associated with the modern-day state of Montenegro. They form an ethnic minority in Kosovo.

== History ==
During the communist period, Montenegrins comprised less than 4% of the population of the Socialist Autonomous Province of Kosovo, yet represented nearly 30% of state security personnel, over 12% of managers and executives, and over 10% of communist party officials in the province.

The Montenegrins were primarily concentrated in the municipalities of Peja, Pristina, Mitrovica, Istog, Deçan, and Gjakova, until 1961. In the period from 1961–1981, the Montenegrins disappeared from 243 settlements, which, combined with the 760 settlements that had no Montenegrin inhabitants in 1961, gives a total of 1,003 settlements without a single Montenegrin inhabitant. As a result of conflicts with the ethnically dominant Albanians, many Montenegrins moved from Kosovo to Montenegro or to Serbia proper.

In December 2008, the Republic of Kosovo recognized the Montenegrin national minority in Kosovo.

== Demographics ==
- 1948 census - 28,050 (3.9%)
- 1953 census - 31,343 (3.9%)
- 1961 census - 37,588 (3.9%)
  - Peja - 12,701 (33.8%)
- 1971 census - 31,555 (2.5%)
- 1981 census - 27,028 (1.7%)
- 1991 census - 20,365 (1%)
- 1995 unofficial estimate - around 7,000 (0.3%)

== See also ==
- Kosovo–Montenegro relations
- Albanians in Kosovo
- Bosniaks in Kosovo
- Serbs of Kosovo
