= Guner =

Guner گونر
- Village
- Location within Iran
- Coordinates: 26°51′55″N 57°26′58″E
- Country: Iran
- Province: Hormozgan
- County: Minab
- Bakhsh: Senderk
- Rural District: Senderk

Population (2006)
  - Total: 107
- Time zone: UTC+3:30 (IRST)
  - Summer (DST): UTC+4:30 (IRDT)

Guner (Persian: گونر, also Romanized as Gūner; also known as Gonar) is a village in Senderk Rural District, Senderk District, Minab County, Hormozgan Province, Iran. At the 2006 census, its population was 107, in 22 families.
