= Güner Ureya =

Kosovar diplomat (born 1973)

Güner Ureya^{[a]} (Albanian: Gyner Ureja; born 6 January 1973 in Prizren, SFR Yugoslavia, today Kosovo) is a Kosovar diplomat. He is the first Kosovar Turkish diplomat to the Republic of Kosovo and first Ambassador of the Republic of Kosovo to the People's Republic of Bangladesh.

== Biography ==
=== Early life and education ===
After completing primary and secondary education at home, Ureya graduated from Journalism in the University of Ankara, and subsequently obtained his master's degree on International Relations in Gazi University, both in Turkey.

=== Career ===
Güner Ureya has a varied career having worked as a journalist, advisor and having held managerial functions in media and government institutions in Turkey and in Kosovo. His previous posts have seen him engaged in issues such as foreign policy, inter-ethnic relations, organizational and legislation issues.

In September 2008 he has been appointed Deputy Head of Mission to the Embassy of the Republic of Kosovo in Turkey. On August 28, 2019, Ambassador Ureya has presented his letters of credence by which he started his term as Extraordinary and Plenipotentiary Ambassador of the Republic of Kosovo to the People's Republic of Bangladesh.

== Notes ==
a.	Turkish spelling: Güner Ureya, Albanian spelling: Gyner Ureja, Serbo-Croat spelling: Đuner Ureja, Ђунер Уреја.
