= Mamusha =

Mamusha: Mamusha (Albanian) Mamuša or Мамуша (Serbian) Mamuşa (Turkish)
- Town and municipality
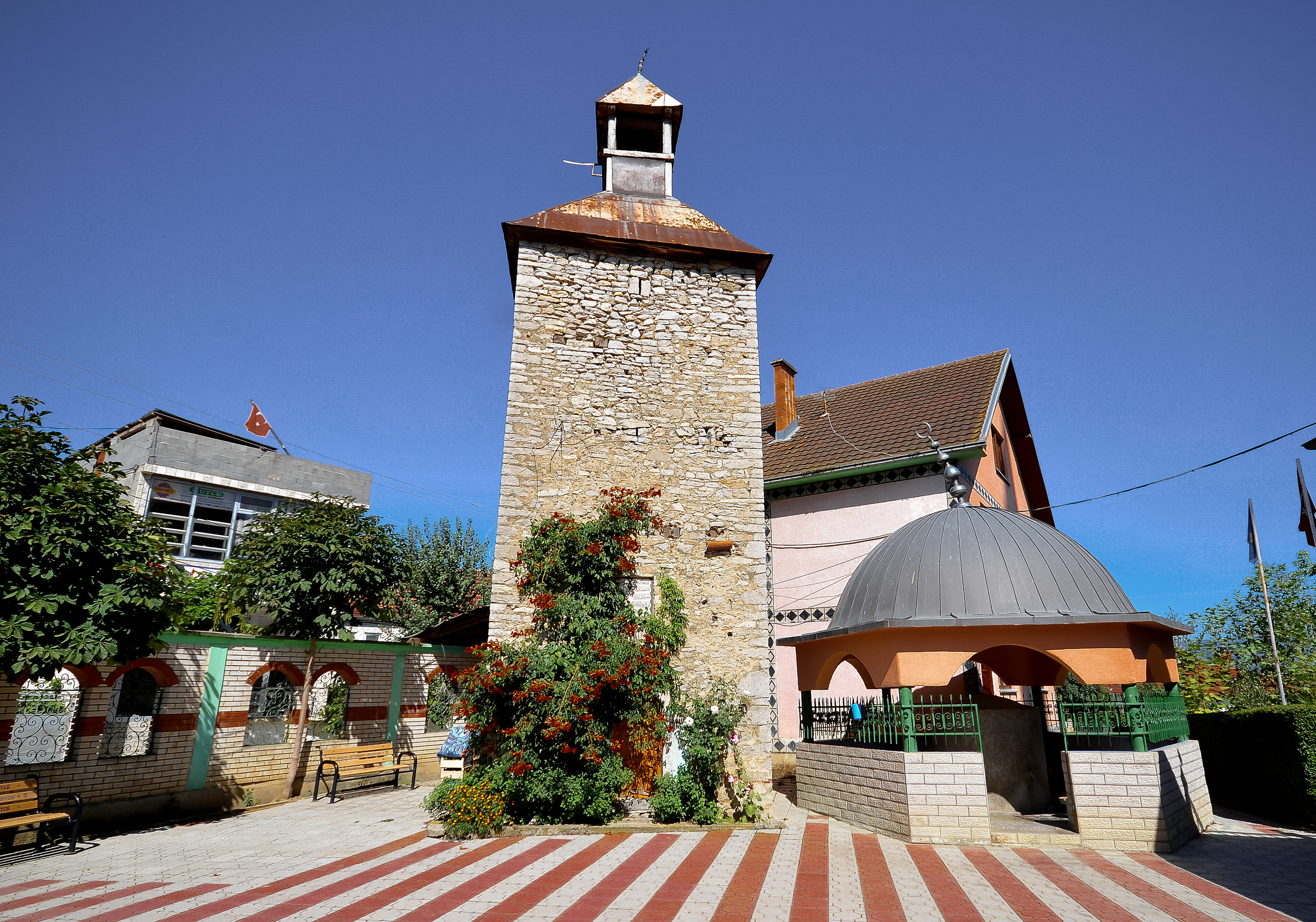
- Clock Tower of Mahmud Pasha, Mamushë (2013)

- Emblem
- Interactive map of Mamusha
- Location within Kosovo
- Coordinates: 42°19′N 20°43′E
- Country: Kosovo
- District: District of Prizren
- Municipality: 2008

Government
  - Mayor: Abdulhadi Krasniqi (KDTP)

Area
  - Urban: 11.7 km^{2} (4.5 sq mi)
  - Municipal: 11.7 km^{2} (4.5 sq mi)
- Elevation: 139 m (456 ft)

Population (2024)
  - Total: 5,615
- Time zone: UTC1
- Postal code: 20540
- Area code: (+381) 029
- Vehicle registration: 04
- Website: mamushe.rks-gov.net

Mamusha (Albanian definite form: Mamusha; Turkish: Mamuşa, Serbian: Мамуша / Mamuša) is a town and municipality located in the district of Prizren of Kosovo. According to the 2011 census, the municipality has a population of 5,507.

In 2008, it became a municipality after being split as a village from the Prizren municipality. Of all municipal units in Kosovo, this one is by far the smallest in terms of area along with North Mitrovica, with only 11 km^{2} (4 sq mi).

The town is located on the northern part of Prizren. It also borders the cities Gjakovë and Suharekë.

== Demographics ==
Historical population
Year	Pop.	±% p.a.
1961	1,590	—
1971	2,038	+2.51%
1981	2,752	+3.05%
2011	5,507	+2.34%
2024	5,615	+0.15%

According to the last official census done in 2011, the municipality of Mamushë has 5,507 inhabitants. Based on the population estimates from the Kosovo Agency of Statistics in 2016, the municipality has 5,897 inhabitants.

=== Ethnic groups ===
The municipality is a primarily composed of ethnic Turks. It is the only settlement in Kosovo where Turks hold a majority. The overwhelming majority of modern Turks in Mamusha are of Albanian origin. Therefore, they still have last names like the tribal names such as Berisha, Bytyçi, Gashi, Hoti, Kastrati, Krasniqi, Kryeziu, Mazreku and others.

The ethnic composition of the municipality:

Ethnic Composition, Including IDPs
Year/Population	Turks	%	Albanians	%	Others	%	Total
1961	1,220	76.73	367	23.09	-	-	1,590
1971	1,794	88.5	241	11.83	–	-	2,038
1981	2,372	86.19	366	13.30	-	-	2,752
2011	5,128	93.1	327	5.9	52	0.9	5,507

== Notable people ==
- Shaip Zurnaxhiu, Albanian poet

== Twin towns – sister cities ==
- Büyükçekmece, Turkey

== See also ==
- Turks in Kosovo

== Sources ==
- Elsie, Robert (2010). Historical Dictionary of Albania. Lanham, Maryland: Scarecrow Press. ISBN 978-0-8108-7380-3.
