= Kosovo Agency of Statistics =

Statistical agency of Kosovo

- Agjencia e Statistikave të Kosovës
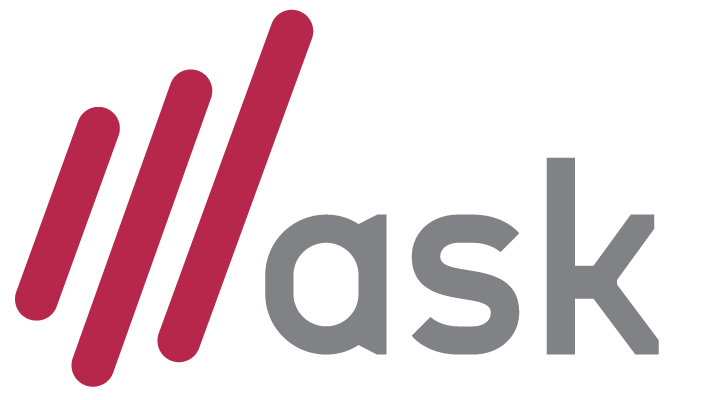

Agency overview
- Formed: 1948 (78 years ago)
- Agency executive: Avni Kastrati, Chief executive officer
- Website: ask.rks-gov.net

The Kosovo Agency of Statistics (Albanian: Agjencia e Statistikave të Kosovës, ASK; Serbian: Agencija za statistiku Kosova) is the national statistics bureau of Kosovo.

It was officially established in 1948, but restarted working as an independent agency in 1999. After Kosovo's declaration of independence in 2008, the ACK organized Kosovo's first population census in 2011. It is supported by international organizations and statistic agencies, like the OSCE, United Nations, etc. As of 2011, the bureau works within the Kosovo Prime Ministry framework.

The last census organized by Kosovo Agency of Statistics took place during April and May of 2024.

== See also ==
- Demographics of Kosovo
