= Cabinet of Avdullah Hoti =

2020 Kosovan government

Hoti Cabinet
- Fourteenth cabinet of Kosovo
- 3 June 2020–22 March 2021
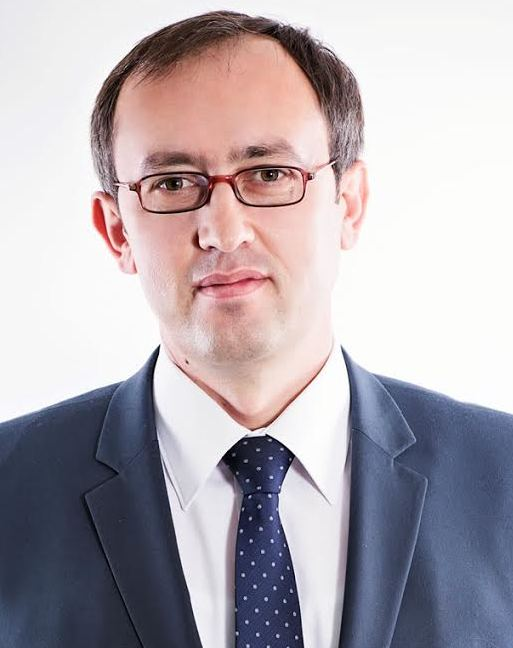
- Date formed: 3 June 2020
- Date dissolved: 22 March 2021

People and organisations
- Head of state: Hashim Thaçi (2020); Vjosa Osmani (2020–2021); Glauk Konjufca (2021)
- Head of government: Avdullah Hoti
- Deputy head of government: Besnik Tahiri
- Member parties: LDK AAK NISMA AKR SL
- Opposition parties: PDK LV

History
- Outgoing formation: 21 December 2020
- Election: 2019
- Legislature term: 7th legislature of the Assembly
- Predecessor: Kurti I
- Successor: Kurti II

The Hoti cabinet was formed in Kosovo on 3 June 2020 following a deal between the political parties Democratic League of Kosovo, Alliance for the Future of Kosovo, Social Democratic Initiative, New Kosovo Alliance and Serb List.

== Actions ==
On 30 April 2020, the President of Kosovo Hashim Thaçi said he has handed Avdullah Hoti a mandate to form a government after the Kurti cabinet collapsed in a no-confidence vote in parliament last month. On 1 May 2020 the Constitutional Court has suspended the implementation of Decree of the President until 29 May 2020. On 28 May 2020 the Constitutional Court assessed that the President has acted in accordance with Article 82, paragraph 2, of the Constitution on the occasion of the mandate of Avdullah Hoti as Prime Minister

On 3 June 2020, Hoti was elected Prime Minister with 61 votes in favor, 24 against and 1 abstains.

On 21 December 2020, The Constitutional Court has concluded that the vote of the MP, Etem Arifi, in favor of the creation of the Hoti Government, has been invalid. As a result, Kosovo must go to snap elections and the Hoti government is now a caretaker one until the elections are held.

== Composition ==
The cabinet consists of the following Ministers:

Portfolio	Minister	Took office	Left office	Party	Ref
Prime Minister of Kosovo	Avdullah Hoti	3 June 2020	22 March 2021	LDK	
Deputy Prime Ministers	Besnik Tahiri	3 June 2020	22 March 2021	AAK	
Deputy Prime Ministers	Driton Selmanaj	3 June 2020	22 March 2021	LDK	
Deputy Prime Ministers	Albulena Balaj-Halimaj	3 June 2020	22 March 2021	NISMA	
Deputy Prime Ministers	Goran Rakić	3 June 2020	22 March 2021	SL	
Minister of Foreign Affairs and Diaspora	Meliza Haradinaj-Stublla	3 June 2020	9 March 2021	AAK	
Minister of Foreign Affairs and Diaspora	Besnik Tahiri (Acting)	9 March 2021	22 March 2021	AAK	
Minister of Communities and Returns	Dalibor Jevtić	3 June 2020	22 March 2021	SL	
Minister of Defense	Anton Quni	3 June 2020	22 March 2021	LDK	
Minister of Infrastructure and Environment	Arban Abrashi	3 June 2020	22 March 2021	LDK	
Minister of Finance and Transfers	Hykmete Bajrami	3 June 2020	24 February 2021	LDK	
Minister of Finance and Transfers	Agim Krasniqi	24 February 2021	22 March 2021	LDK	
Minister of Health	Armend Zemaj	3 June 2020	22 March 2021	LDK	
Minister of Culture, Youth and Sports	Vlora Dumoshi	3 June 2020	22 March 2021	LDK	
Minister of Justice	Selim Selimi	3 June 2020	22 March 2021	AAK	
Minister of Education, Science and Technology and Innovation	Ramë Likaj	3 June 2020	22 March 2021	AAK	
Minister of Internal Affairs and Public Administration	Agim Veliu	3 June 2020	22 March 2021	LDK	
Minister of Economy, Employment, Entrepreneurship and Strategic Investments	Blerim Kuqi	3 June 2020	13 January 2021	AAK	
Minister of Economy, Employment, Entrepreneurship and Strategic Investments	Muharrem Nitaj (acting)	13 January 2020	22 March 2021	AAK	
Minister of Labour and Social Welfare	Skender Reçica	3 June 2020	22 March 2021	NISMA	
Minister of Agriculture	Besian Mustafa	3 June 2020	22 March 2021	LDK	
Ministry of Trade and Industry	Vesel Krasniqi	3 June 2020	22 March 2021	NISMA	
Minister of Rural Development	Enis Kervan	3 June 2020	22 March 2021	KDTP	
Minister of Administration and Local Government	Goran Rakić	3 June 2020	22 March 2021	SL	
