= 2020 Kosovan local elections =

Election held in 2020

Local mayoral by-elections were held in the Kosovo municipalities of North Mitrovica and Podujevo on 29 November 2020. The election in Podujevo was originally scheduled for 15 March 2020 but was rescheduled due to the COVID-19 pandemic.

The by-elections in both municipalities were necessitated by the incumbent mayor resigning to join the Government of Kosovo. Podujevo mayor Agim Veliu resigned to become minister of the interior in Albin Kurti's first administration, while North Mitrovica mayor Goran Rakić resigned to become a deputy prime minister in Avdullah Hoti's government.

== Results ==
As expected, the Serb List won the by-election in North Mitrovica without any difficulty. Vetëvendosje, which was then in opposition in the Assembly of the Republic of Kosovo, won a somewhat unexpected first-round victory in Podujevo.

=== North Mitrovica ===
Mayoral results
Candidate	Party	Votes	%
Milan Radojević	Serb List	7,916	89.54
Erden Atiq	Levizja Vetëvendosje!	351	3.97
Florent Azemi	Democratic Party of Kosovo	318	3.60
Dušan Milunović	Independent	256	2.90
Total		8,841	100.00

=== Podujevo ===
Mayoral results
Candidate	Party	Votes	%
Shpejtim Bulliqi	Levizja Vetëvendosje!	18,286	51.87
Nexhmi Rudari	Democratic League of Kosovo	12,627	35.82
Naim Fetahu	Democratic Party of Kosovo	4,341	12.31
Total		35,254	100.00
