= First cabinet of Albin Kurti =

Cabinet of Kosovo formed on 3 February 2020

First Kurti Cabinet
- Thirteenth cabinet of Kosovo
- 3 February 2020 – 3 June 2020
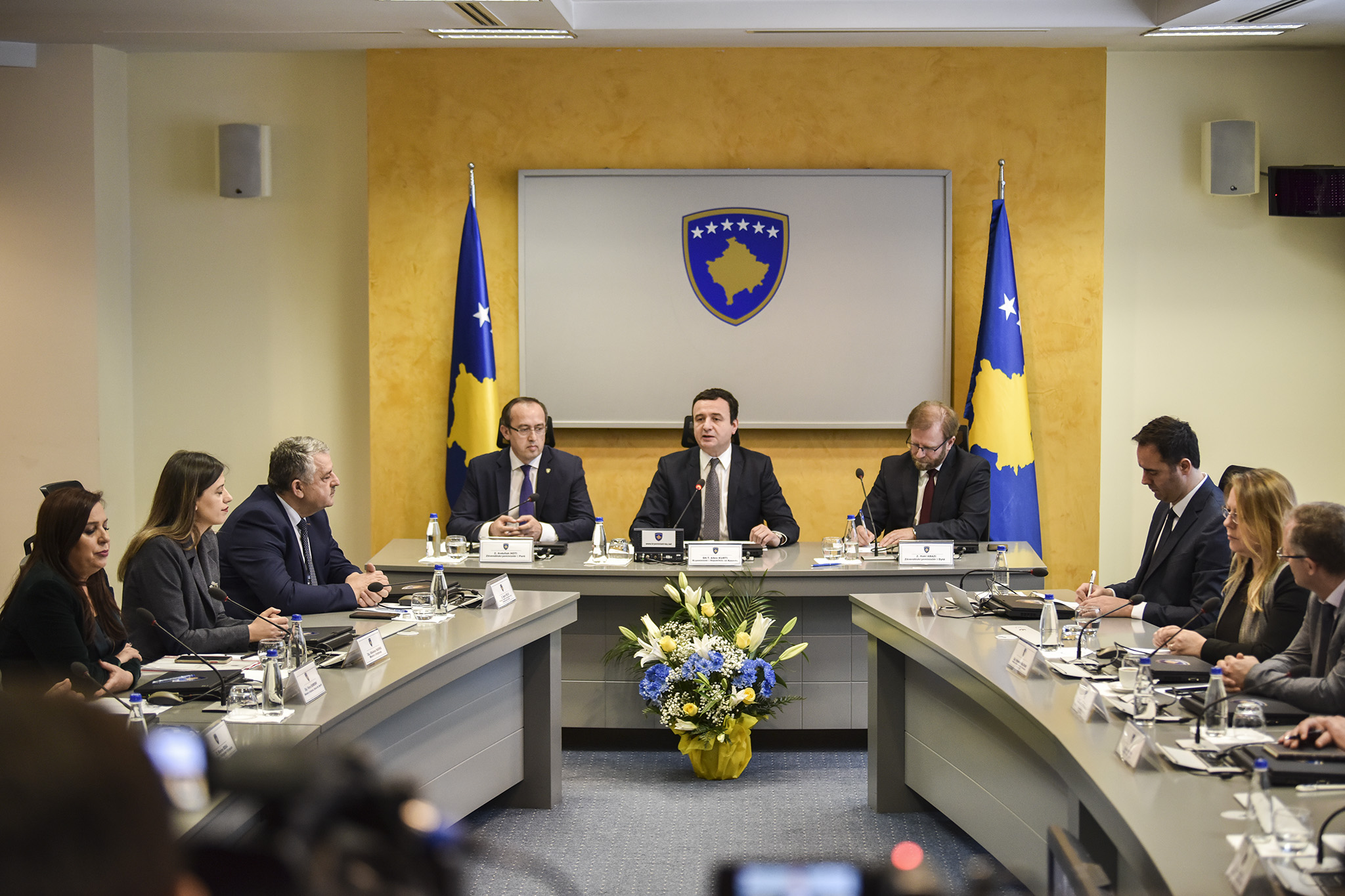
- Date formed: 3 February 2020
- Date dissolved: 3 June 2020

People and organisations
- Head of state: Hashim Thaçi
- Head of government: Albin Kurti
- Deputy head of government: Avdullah Hoti
- Member parties: LV LDK SL
- Status in legislature: Majority Coalition
- Opposition parties: PDK AAK NISMA AKR

History
- Outgoing formation: 25 March 2020
- Election: 2019
- Legislature term: 7th legislature of the Assembly
- Predecessor: Haradinaj II
- Successor: Hoti

The First Kurti cabinet was formed in Kosovo on 3 February 2020 following a deal between the political parties Vetëvendosje, New Democratic Party, Democratic League of Kosovo and Serb List. On 25 March 2020, the government lost a vote of no confidence that was brought by the Democratic League of Kosovo.

== Actions ==
On 3 February 2020, Albin Kurti was confirmed as the prime minister of Kosovo by the Kosovo Assembly following the 2019 parliamentary elections with sixty six in favor and ten abstentions from the seventy six deputies who remained present after multiple opposition party deputies left the parliament in protest.

On 12 February, the cabinet reversed decisions made by the former Haradinaj cabinet to increase ministerial salaries from €1,500 to €2,950 and continue to pay ministers' salaries after the end of their mandate. The Kurti cabinet also asked parliament to extend the budget until March. On 27 February, Kurti announced a timetable for gradually removing a 100% import tariff on goods from Bosnia-Herzegovina and Serbia, "as a sign of good will and readiness to resolve the economic dispute with Serbia" and to help with the integration of Kosovo into the European Union. On 20 March, the cabinet voted ten to two in favor of removing the 100% import tariff on raw materials only. The decision was not supported by the Democratic League of Kosovo (LDK) coalition party and drew criticism from senior United States personalities as they had called for all tariffs to be removed.

On 18 March, Kurti sacked Interior Minister Agim Veliu (LDK) due to his support for declaring a state of emergency to handle the coronavirus pandemic, which would have given power to the Kosovo Security Council chaired by Hashim Thaçi (PDK). The Democratic League of Kosovo, the junior partner leader of the coalition, filed a no-confidence vote motion in retaliation for the sacking and due to other internal disagreements between the coalition members and on 25 March, eighty two members of the Kosovo Assembly voted in favor of the motion, becoming the first government to be voted out of power due to disagreements over how to handle the coronavirus pandemic.

The First Kurti cabinet continued as a caretaker government.

== Composition ==
The cabinet consists of the following Ministers:

Portfolio	Minister	Took office	Left office	Party	Ref
Prime Minister of Kosovo	Albin Kurti	3 February 2020	3 June 2020	LVV	
Deputy Prime Ministers	Avdullah Hoti	3 February 2020	25 March 2020	LDK	
Deputy Prime Ministers	Haki Abazi	3 February 2020	3 June 2020	LVV	
Minister of Foreign Affairs and Diaspora	Glauk Konjufca	3 February 2020	3 June 2020	LVV	
Minister of Communities and Returns	Dalibor Jevtić	3 February 2020	3 June 2020	SL	
Minister of Defence	Anton Quni	3 February 2020	3 June 2020	LDK	
Minister of Infrastructure and Environment	Lumir Abdixhiku	3 February 2020	3 June 2020	LDK	
Minister of Finance and Transfers	Besnik Bislimi	3 February 2020	3 June 2020	LVV	
Minister of Health	Arben Vitia	3 February 2020	3 June 2020	LVV	
Minister of Culture, Youth and Sports	Vlora Dumoshi	3 February 2020	3 June 2020	LDK	
Minister of European Integration	Blerim Reka	3 February 2020	3 June 2020	LVV	
Minister of Justice	Albulena Haxhiu	3 February 2020	3 June 2020	LVV	
Minister of Education, Science and Technology and Innovation	Hykmete Bajrami	3 February 2020	3 June 2020	LDK	
Minister of Internal Affairs and Public Administration	Agim Veliu	3 February 2020	18 March 2020	LDK	
Minister of Internal Affairs and Public Administration	Xhelal Sveçla (acting)	18 March 2020	3 June 2020	LVV	
Minister of Economy, Employment, Trade, Industry, Entrepreneurship and Strategic Investments	Rozeta Hajdari	3 February 2020	3 June 2020	LVV	
Minister of Administration and Local Government	Emilija Redžepi	3 February 2020	3 June 2020	NDS	
Minister of Agriculture, Forestry and Rural Development	Besian Mustafa	3 February 2020	3 June 2020	LDK	
Minister of Rural Development	Ivan Milojević	3 February 2020	3 June 2020	SL	
