= First Kohl cabinet (Rhineland-Palatinate) =

First Cabinet of Helmut Kohl Kohl I
- 9th Cabinet of Rhineland-Palatinate
- 19 May 1969 – 18 May 1971
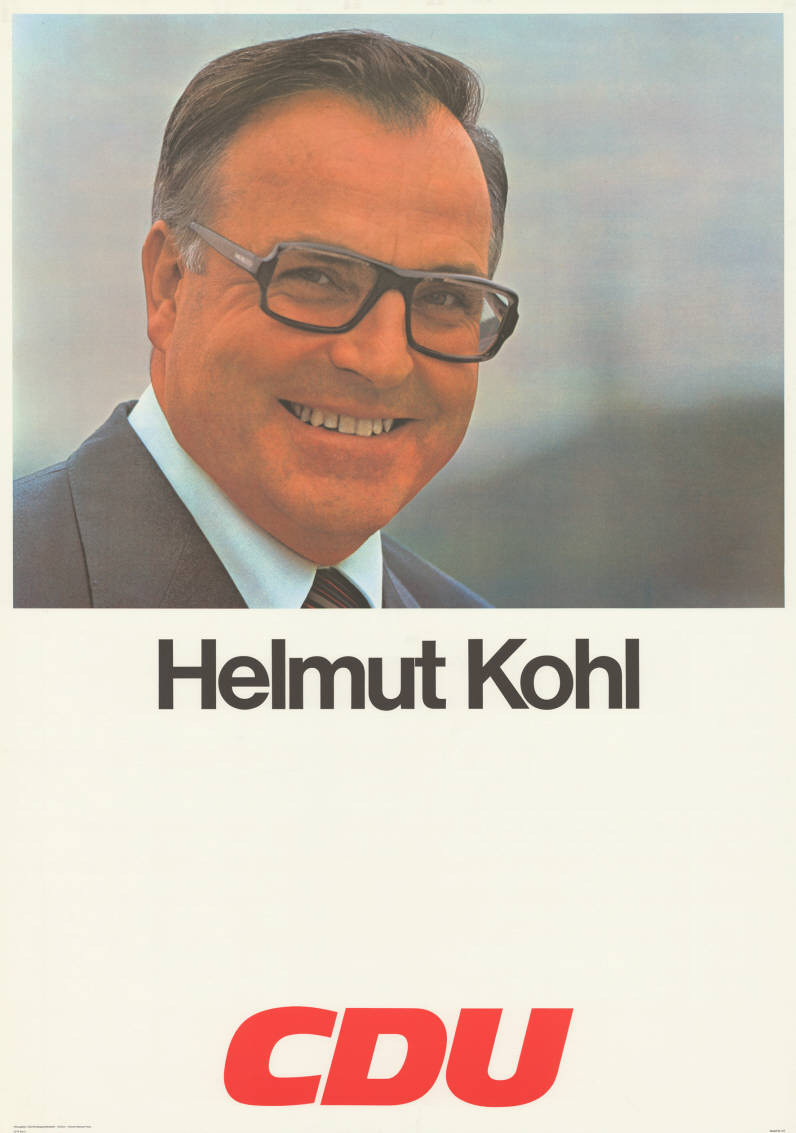
- Date formed: 19 May 1969
- Date dissolved: 18 May 1971 (1 year, 11 months, 4 weeks and 1 day)

People and organisations
- Chancellor: Willy Brandt
- Minister President: Helmut Kohl
- Deputy Minister President: Otto Meyer
- Member party: Christian Democratic Union; Free Democratic Party
- Opposition party: Social Democratic Party; National Democratic Party
- Opposition leader: Social Democratic Party

History
- Election: 1990 Lower Saxony state election
- Legislature term: 6th Landtag of Lower Saxony
- Predecessor: Cabinet Altmeier VI
- Successor: Cabinet Kohl II

The First Kohl cabinet was the state government of the German state of Rhineland-Palatinate from 19 May 1969 until 18 May 1971. The Cabinet was headed by Minister President Helmut Kohl and was formed by the Christian Democratic Union and the Free Democratic Party after the resignation of Minister President Peter Altmeier. On 19 May 1969 Kohl was elected and sworn in as Minister President by the Landtag of Rhineland-Palatinate. It was succeeded by Kohl's second and third cabinets.

== Composition ==
| Portfolio | Minister | Took office | Left office | Party |
|---|---|---|---|---|
| Minister President | Helmut Kohl | 18 May 1969 | 19 May 1971 | CDU |
| Deputy Minister President; Minister of Agriculture, viticulture and forestry | Otto Meyer | 18 May 1969 | 19 May 1971 | CDU |
| Minister of the Interior | August Wolters | 18 May 1969 | 19 May 1971 | CDU |
| Minister of Justice | Fritz Schneider | 18 May 1969 | 19 May 1971 | FDP |
| Minister of Finance and Reconstruction | Hermann Eicher | 18 May 1969 | 19 May 1971 | FDP |
| Minister of Education and Culture | Bernhard Vogel | 18 May 1969 | 19 May 1971 | CDU |
| Minister of Economy and Transport | Hanns Neubauer | 18 May 1969 | 19 May 1971 | CDU |
| Minister of Social Affairs | Heiner Geißler | 18 May 1969 | 19 May 1971 | CDU |
