= Hekuran Murati =

Kosovar politician; Minister of Finance, Labor and Transfers

Minister of Finance, Labor and Transfers
- Incumbent
- Assumed office 22 March 2021
- President: Glauk Konjufca (acting); Vjosa Osmani; Albulena Haxhiu (acting)
- Prime Minister: Albin Kurti
- Preceded by: Agim Krasniqi (acting); Hykmete Bajrami

Personal details
- Born: 7 November 1987 (age 38) Ferizaj, Kosovo, Yugoslavia (now Kosovo)
- Party: Vetëvendosje
- Education: RIT Kosovo; Hochschule Bremen; University of North Carolina Wilmington

Hekuran Murati (born November 7, 1987) is a Kosovar economist and conservative politician, currently serving as minister of finance, labor and transfers of Kosovo. After a career in civil service and business consultancy, he rose to national prominence with his research and media appearances critical of public-sector mismanagement and privatization. He entered politics in 2019 and served as member of parliament before his current assignment.

== Early life and education ==
Murati received his bachelor's degree in business management from the American University of Kosovo (now RIT Kosovo) and completed his master's studies in investments management at Hochschule Bremen and international finance at the University of North Carolina Wilmington. His master's thesis, titled ""The Day-of-the-Week Trading Effect: A Comparison of the Croatian and Slovenian Market", is available online.

== Political career ==
Murati joined the VETËVENDOSJE! Movement in August 2019. He was elected member of parliament in the October 2019 elections. He served as chairman of the budget and finance committee in the 7th legislature, and concurrently participated in the committee for economy, employment, trade, industry, entrepreneurship and strategic investments and the investigate committee on privatization.

As one of the best voted candidates in the 2021 parliamentary elections, Murati gave up his seat in parliament to assume the post of minister of finance, labor and transfers in the second Kurti government. His portfolio merges the former ministry of finances, ministry of labor and the transfers section of the social welfare ministry.

He is known for fiscal prudence. Government revenues and spending have significantly increased during his tenure. As minister, he discontinued the practice of leasing out customs terminals and announced welfare benefits for new mothers and children.

== Other activities ==
- International Monetary Fund (IMF), Ex-Officio Alternate Member of the Board of Governors (since 2021)

== Personal life ==
An investments expert, he has doubled his portfolio of private investments in the recent years. He is a shareholder in Tesla Inc, Allianz SE, Volkswagen AG, and Netflix Inc.
