= Heinz Schwarz =

German politician (1928–2023)

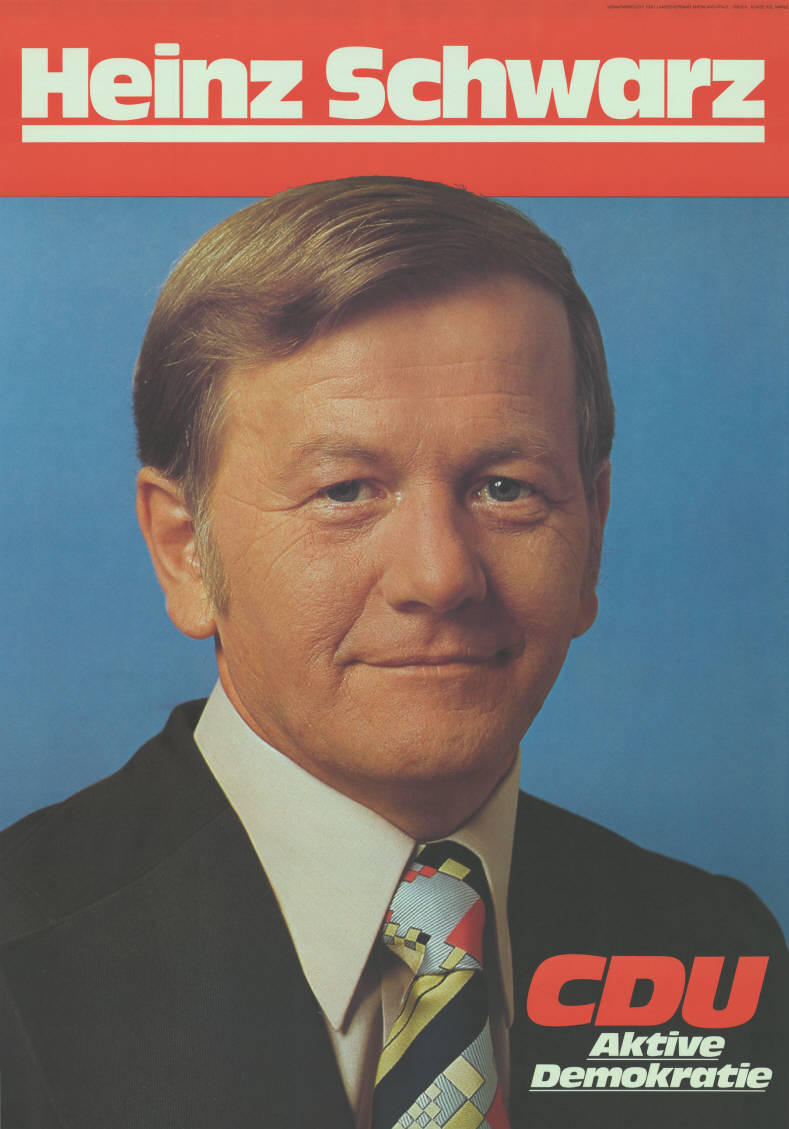
- Poster for the election for the Landtag of Rhineland-Palatinate in 1975

Minister of the Interior of Rhineland-Palatinate
- In office 1971–1976
- Minister-President: Helmut Kohl
- Preceded by: August Wolters
- Succeeded by: Kurt Böckmann

Personal details
- Born: 24 July 1928 Leubsdorf, German Reich
- Died: 6 March 2023 (aged 94)
- Party: CDU
- Children: 2
- Occupation: Politician and author
- Awards: Order of Merit of the Federal Republic of Germany

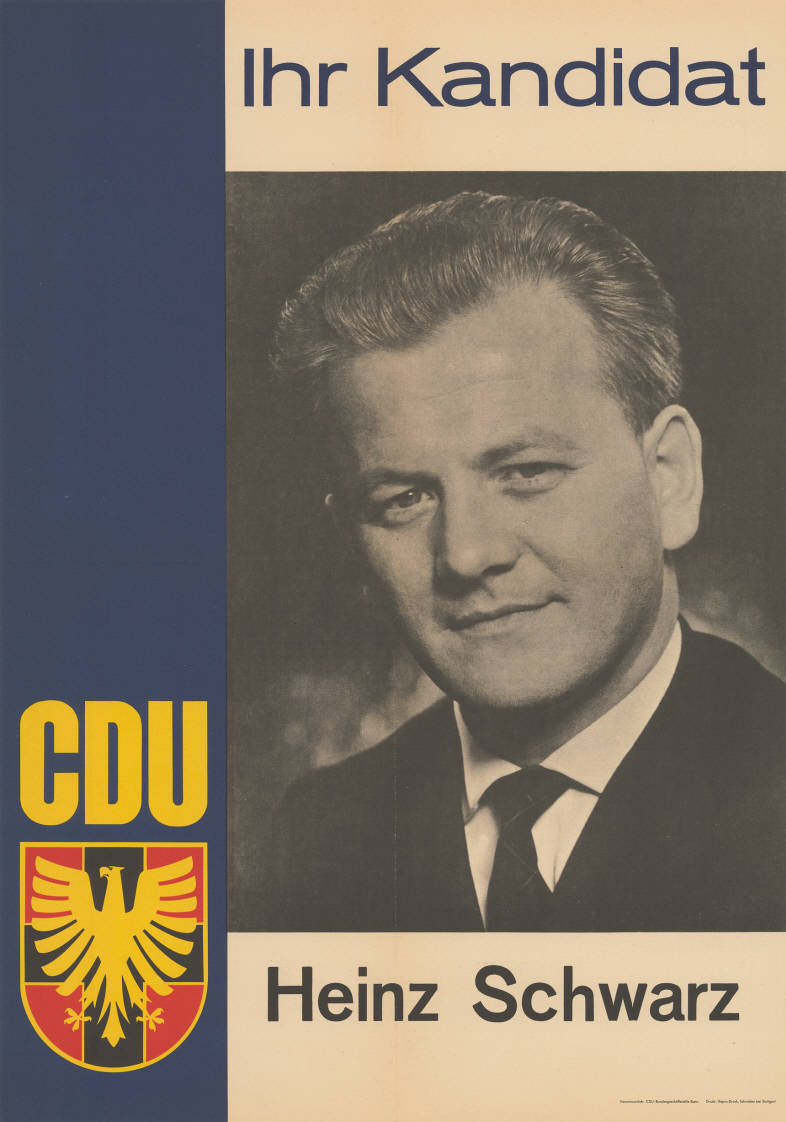
Poster in 1963

Heinz Schwarz (24 July 1928 – 6 March 2023) was a German politician of the Christian Democratic Union of Germany (CDU) who was a long-time member of the state parliament of Rhineland-Palatinate, serving as the state's minister of the interior. From 1976 to 1990, he was a member of the Bundestag.

== Life and work ==
Schwarz was born in Leubsdorf on 24 July 1928, the son of a vintner and innkeeper. He attended elementary, trade and viticulture schools. In 1944 he began a commercial apprenticeship at the Kreissparkasse in Neuwied, but was drafted as an Airforce auxiliary (Luftwaffenhelfer). After World War II, he completed his commercial education in 1947. He trained as a banker until 1947, and then worked in his parents' vineyard and at times as an industrial labourer. He owned two companies in his hometown, an antique shop and a company that imported raw materials.

== Party ==
Schwarz joined the Christian Democratic Union of Germany (CDU) in 1947. From 1949 to 1951 he was the head of CDU's Neuwied Kreisverband (district). He was state secretary of the Junge Union youth organisation from 1952 to 1954, and its national secretary from 1955 to 1961. He was responsible for the party in Rhineland-Palatinate from 1961 to 1964, and head of the district Koblenz-Montabaur from 1969 to 1980. In 2020, he was one of only two people to be present at all party conventions of the CDU since the founding convention in 1950. The other was Günter-Helge Strickstrack, who died that year.

== Member of parliament ==
Schwarz was a member of the council of Leubsdorf from 1956 to 1960, and a member of the district council of Landkreis Neuwied from 1956 to 1971. He was elected to the Landtag of Rhineland-Palatinate in 1959, where he served as deputy president of the CDU from 1967 to 1971, and as president of the Innenausschuss (interior affairs). He was elected to the national parliament, Bundestag, in 1976 where he remained until 1990. There he was a member of the Auswärtiger Ausschuss (foreign committee).

== Public positions ==
Schwarz was mayor of Bad Hönningen from 1964 to 1971. On 18 May 1971, he was appointed by minister-president Helmut Kohl as minister of the interior, succeeding August Wolters. His tenure ended when he was elected to the Bundestag, and he was succeeded by Kurt Böckmann.

== Personal life and death ==
Schwarz was married; the couple's son Stefan Schwarz also became a politician. Their second son is publicist Thomas Schwarz.

Schwarz died on 6 March 2023, at age 94. He was the last living member of the 1959 Landtag. Malu Dreyer, minister-president of Rhineland-Palatinate, said "Heinz Schwarz was a politician out of deep conviction. As a Rhenish Catholic who lived through the Second World War, he was concerned with a better future for our country, in which people build bridges for a firm democracy." ("Heinz Schwarz war Politiker aus tiefer Überzeugung. Als rheinischer Katholik, der den Zweiten Weltkrieg miterlebte, ging es ihm um eine bessere Zukunft für unser Land, in der Menschen Brücken für eine feste Demokratie bauen").

== Awards ==
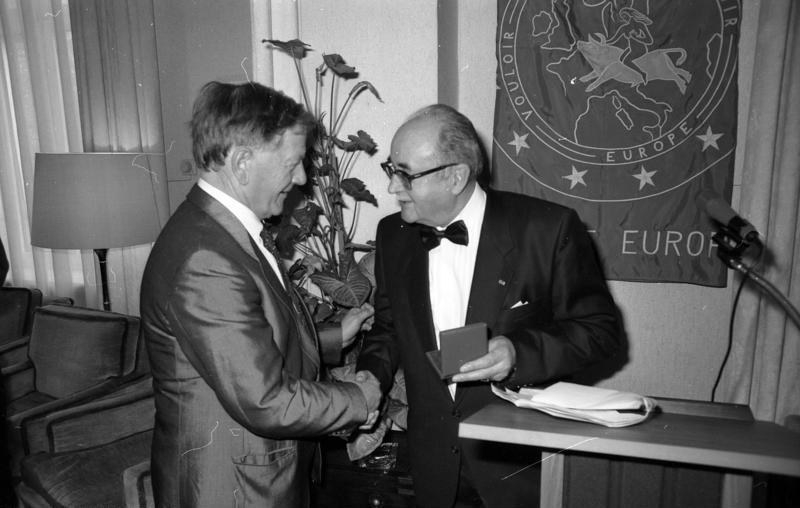
Schwarz receiving the Mérite Européen in 1989

- 1969: Order of Merit of the Federal Republic of Germany
- 1986: Commander Cross of the Order of Merit
- 1989: Mérite Européen

== Publications ==
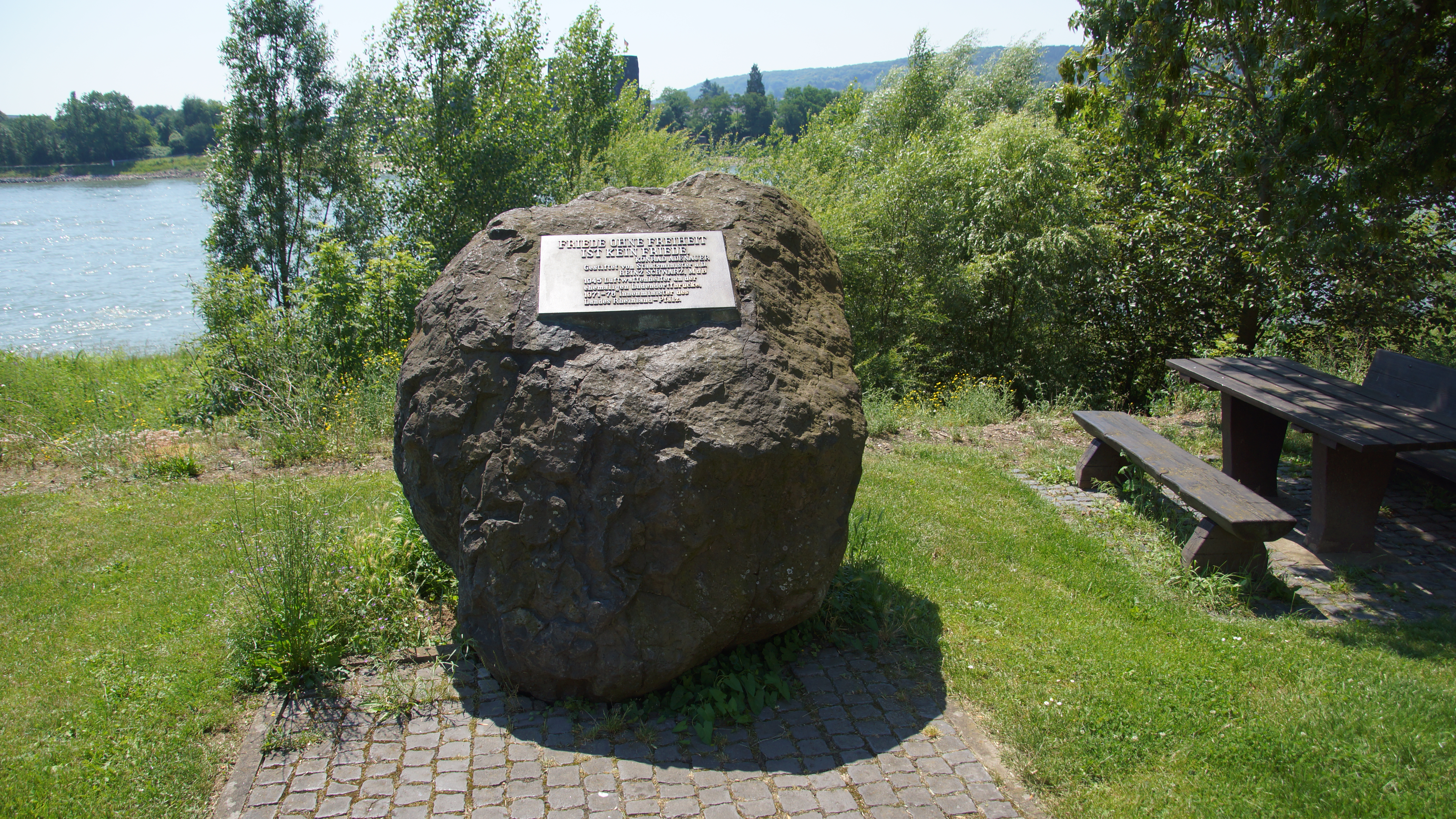
Memorial Friede ohne Freiheit ist kein Friede, by Schwarz, 1988

Publications by Schwarz as author or editor are held by the German National Library:

- Schwarz, Heinz (1975). Sicherheit oder Freiheit? : innere Sicherheit als Prüfstein der Demokratie (in German). Stuttgart: Verlag Bonn Aktuell. ISBN 3-87959-031-1. OCLC 9761838.
- Schwarz, Heinz; Schleyer, Hanns Martin (1978). Der Fahndungsskandal Schleyer (in German). Bonn: Bundeshaus Selbstverl. OCLC 258009073.

== Memorial ==
Schwarz donated a memorial monument at the Ludendorff Bridge in Remagen, where he had served as Luftwaffenhelfer. The plaque, on the east bank of the river in Erpel, quotes Konrad Adenauer: "Friede ohne Freiheit ist kein Friede" ("Peace without freedom is no peace").

== Cabinet ==
- Second Kohl cabinet (Rhineland-Palatinate), Minister of the Interior 1971–1975
- Third Kohl cabinet (Rhineland-Palatinate), Minister of the Interior 1975–1976
