= Imri Demelezi =

Kosovar agronomist and politician

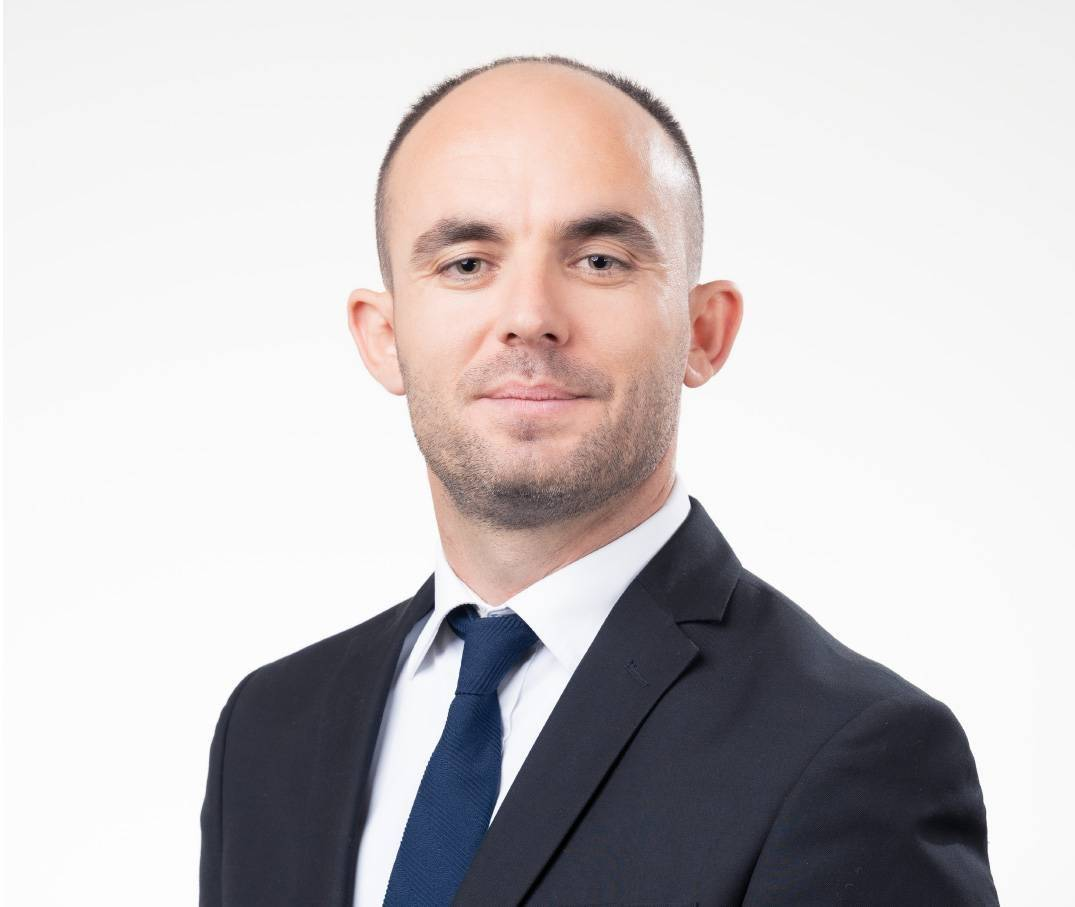
- Official portrait, 2021

Deputy Minister of Agriculture, Forestry and Rural Development
- Incumbent
- Assumed office 7 April 2021
- President: Vjosa Osmani
- Prime Minister: Albin Kurti
- Minister: Faton Peci
- In office 10 February 2020 – 3 June 2020
- President: Hashim Thaçi
- Prime Minister: Albin Kurti
- Minister: Besian Mustafa

Personal details
- Born: 1 January 1985 (age 41) Viti, SAP Kosovo, SFR Yugoslavia (now Kosovo)
- Party: Vetëvendosje
- Education: University of Prishtina (BA); University of Bologna

Imri Demelezi (born 1985) is a Kosovar Albanian agroeconomist and current deputy minister of agriculture, forestry and rural development of the Republic of Kosovo.

He completed his undergraduate studies in agroeconomics at the University of Prishtina and obtained a master's degree in sustainable agricultural and rural development from the University of Bologna in Italy. He also completed a specialization in agriculture at CIHEAM, IAMB, in Bari, Italy.

He formerly worked as a teaching assistant at the University of Prishtina, and lectured at UBT College prior to his current position.

Demelezi was a candidate in the 2019 parliamentary election with Vetëvendosje. He served as deputy minister of agriculture in the first Kurti government during its brief tenure in 2020. He returned to government with the second Kurti cabinet in March 2021.
