= Stefan Schwarz (politician) =

German lobbyist and politician (born 1959)

MdB Stefan Schwarz
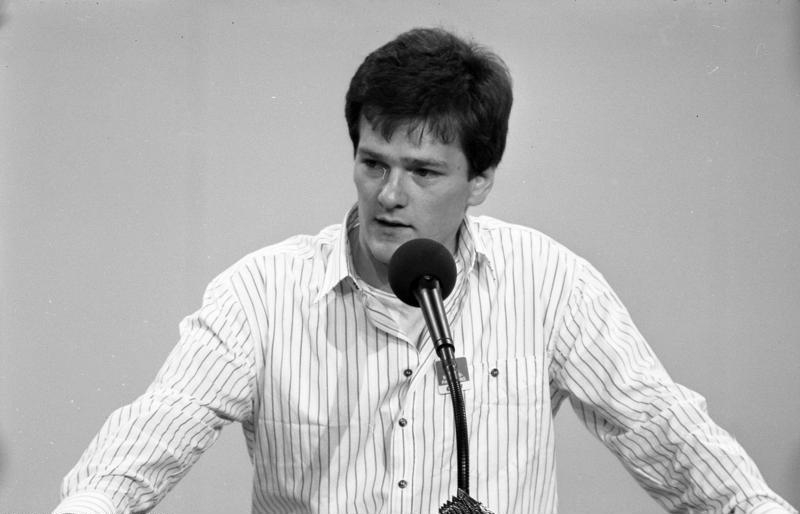
- Schwarz in 1989

Member of the Bundestag from Rhineland-Palatinate
- In office 1990–1994
- Constituency: Rhineland-Palatinate

Personal details
- Born: Stefan Schwarz; 31 August 1959 (age 65); Bonn, West Germany (now Germany)
- Spouse: Donika Gërvalla
- Relations: Jusuf Gërvalla (father-in-law)
- Children: 5
- Parent: Heinz Schwarz (father)
- Occupation: Lobbyist, scientific assistant, politician

Stefan Schwarz (German pronunciation: [ʃvaʁts]; born 31 August 1959) is a German lobbyist, scientific assistant and former politician who served as a member of the Bundestag for the Christian Democratic Union from 1990 to 1994 representing Rhineland-Palatinate. He is married to Donika Gërvalla-Schwarz who currently serves as Second Deputy Prime Minister of Kosovo.

== Life ==
Schwarz was born 31 August 1959 in Bonn, West Germany to Heinz Schwarz, a Rhineland-Palatinate state legislator and ministry of the interior. His older brother is the publicist Thomas Schwarz (b. 1957).
