= Bedri Hamza =

Politician from Kosovo (born 1963)

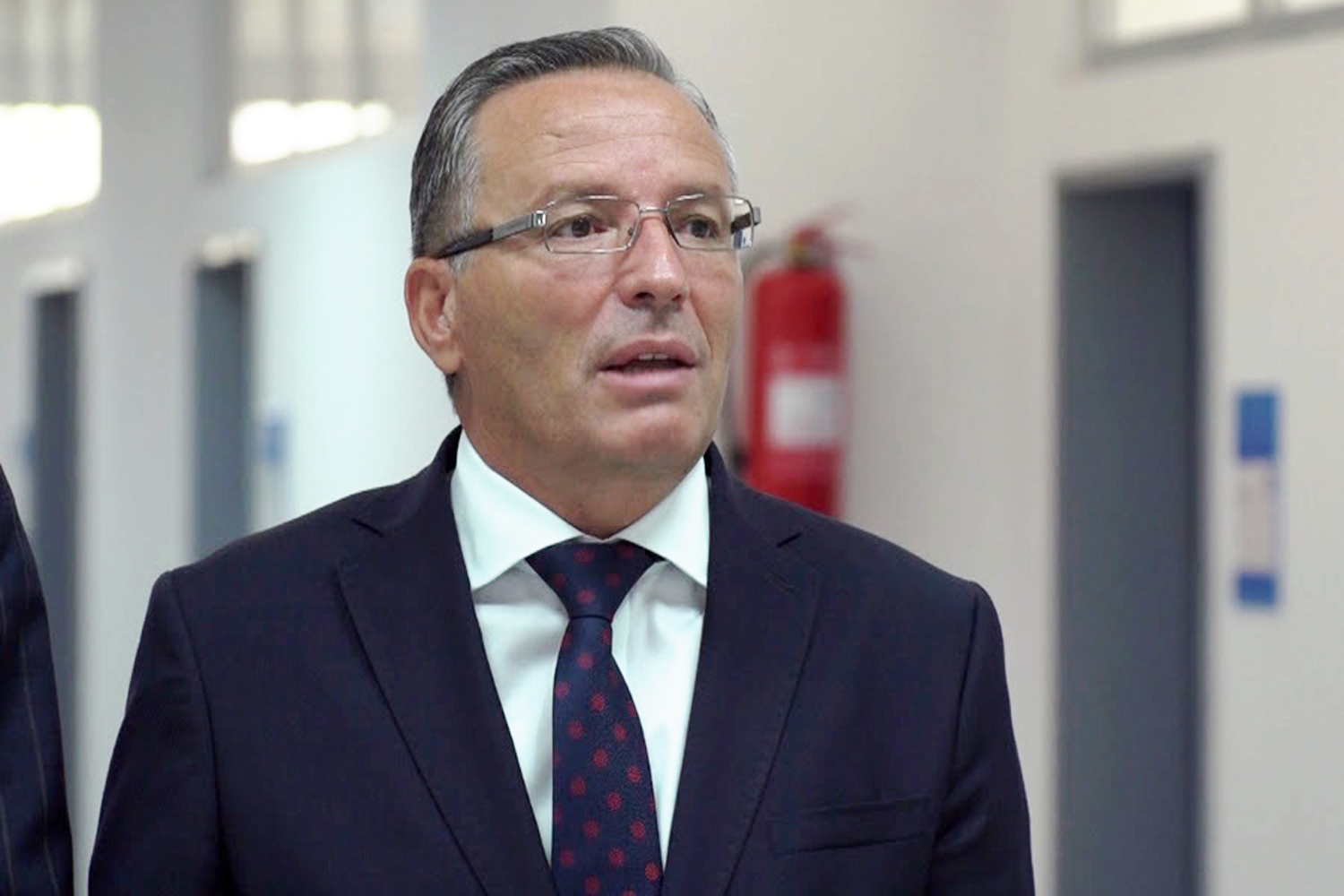
- Bedri Hamza

Leader of the Democratic Party of Kosovo
- In office 17 November 2025 – 21 October 2026
- Preceded by: Memli Krasniqi
- Succeeded by: Vlora Çitaku (Acting)

Leader of the Opposition
- In office 17 November 2025 – 21 October 2026
- Preceded by: Memli Krasniqi
- Succeeded by: Vlora Çitaku

Mayor of South Mitrovica
- In office 7 December 2021 – 12 December 2025
- Preceded by: Agim Bahtiri
- Succeeded by: Faton Peci

Ministry of Finance (Kosovo)
- In office 9 September 2017 – 26 November 2019
- Prime Minister: Ramush Haradinaj
- Preceded by: Agim Krasniqi
- Succeeded by: Besnik Bislimi
- In office 22 February 2011 – 9 December 2014
- Prime Minister: Hashim Thaçi
- Preceded by: Ahmet Shala
- Succeeded by: Avdullah Hoti

Governor of Central Bank of Kosovo
- In office 14 March 2013 – 10 September 2017
- Preceded by: Gani Gërguri
- Succeeded by: Fehmi Mehmeti

Personal details
- Born: 8 November 1963 (age 62) Skenderaj, SAP Kosovo, SFR Yugoslavia (present-day Kosovo)
- Party: Democratic Party of Kosovo
- Children: 3
- Education: University of Pristina

Bedri Hamza (born 8 November 1963) is a politician and administrator in Kosovo. He has been the Republic of Kosovo's finance minister on two occasions, served three terms in the Assembly of the Republic of Kosovo, was governor of the Central Bank of Kosovo from 2013 to 2017, and served one term as the mayor of South Mitrovica. Hamza is also the current chairman of the Democratic Party of Kosovo (PDK) and the candidate for Prime Minister of Kosovo in the 9 February elections and December 28 elections.

== Early life and career ==
Hamza was born to a Kosovo Albanian family in the village of Klina e Epërme in the municipality of Skenderaj, in what was then the Autonomous Province of Kosovo and Metohija in the Socialist Republic of Serbia, Socialist Federal Republic of Yugoslavia. He graduated from the historical University of Pristina's Faculty of Economics in 1987 and later received a master's degree from the post-1999 institution of the same name on the topic, "Problems of improving the fiscal system of the Republic of Kosovo." He has taken doctoral studies at the University of Tirana in Albania.

Hamza was head of accounting and finance at Trepča Lead Metallurgy in Mitrovica from 1987 to 1990. He worked in the private sector from 1990 to 1998 and led the Mitrovica municipal assembly's directorate of public services from 2000 to 2003.

== Politician and administrator ==
Hamza was a candidate on the PDK's electoral list for Mitrovica in the 2002 Kosovan local elections. Online sources do not indicate if he served in the local assembly afterward.

He appeared in the eighty-first position on the PDK's list in the 2004 Kosovan parliamentary election, which was held under closed list proportional representation, and was not elected when the list won thirty seats. The PDK was in opposition from 2004 to 2008, and Hamza served on the party's shadow cabinet with responsibility for finance and economy. In 2006, he was a member of Kosovo's delegation to Vienna for discussions with the Republic of Serbia on economic issues.

=== Deputy minister (2008–11) ===
All parliamentary elections in Kosovo since 2007 have been held under open list proportional representation. Hamza was given the fifty-fifth position on the PDK's list in the 2007 parliamentary election and finished in fortieth place among the party's candidates. The list won thirty-seven mandates, and he was not elected. Due to a requirement that one-third of seats be reserved for female candidates, he was also not immediately in line for a replacement mandate.

The PDK and the rival Democratic League of Kosovo (LDK) formed a coalition government after the 2007 election. In January 2008, Hamza was appointed as Kosovo's deputy minister of economy and finance. In June of the same year, he and Albanian economy, trade, and energy minister Genc Ruli announced an agreement on cooperation for electrical power. Later in 2008, Hamza announced that Kosovo's government would not allow its borders to operate on United Nations Interim Administration Mission in Kosovo (UNMIK) regulations.

Hamza said in a 2009 interview that investment in energy, roads, and private sector were necessary strategic steps to boost economic growth in Kosovo. He added that years of high growth would be needed to address issues of endemic poverty, saying, "To reduce poverty and unemployment we need to have economic growth of more than eight percent for the next six or seven years."

He had the opportunity to enter the Kosovo assembly in March 2010 but instead continued to serve as a deputy minister. He would not have been able to hold both positions simultaneously under a dual mandate.

=== Finance minister (first time: 2011–13) ===
The PDK–LDK coalition fell apart in late 2010, and a new parliamentary election was held in December of that year. Hamza was again included on the PDK's electoral list and this time finished in eleventh place among its candidates. The PDK won thirty-four seats, and he was elected to the assembly. His first term as a legislator as brief; the PDK formed government after the election, and Hamza was appointed as Kosovo's finance minister on the day the assembly convened.

As minister, Hamza pursued a privatization strategy for Kosovo Telecom. In April 2011, he signed an agreement with Zoran Stavreski, the finance minister for the Republic of Macedonia (now North Macedonia), on double taxation avoidance and protection from tax evasion. The following year, he signed an agreement with Turkish finance minister Mehmet Şimşek to collaborate on mutual tax relations.

=== Governor of the Central Bank of Kosovo (2013–17) ===
Hamza was appointed as governor of the Central Bank of Kosovo on 14 March 2013. His appointment was controversial. Opposition parties argued that the bank's autonomy would be compromised with a leading PDK figure as its governor, and Ismet Beqiri of the LDK charged that it would become a private bank of the PDK and government. This notwithstanding, Hamza served in the role for the next four and a half years.

=== Finance minister (second time: 2017–20) ===
Hamza resigned as governor of the central bank on 13 September 2017 to return to the office of finance minister. In February 2018, he helped to facilitate a European Union grant of 38.5 million Euros for the upgrade of Kosovo's railway system.

In 2018, the Republic of Kosovo introduced a punitive one hundred per cent tariff on goods from Serbia, as a means of pressuring Serbia for a comprehensive deal that would include recognition of Kosovo as an independent country. In January 2019, Hamza said that Serbia's revenues had fallen by eighty million Euros as a result of the tariff and that the Republic of Kosovo was working to prevent what it described as smuggling from Serbia.

=== Parliamentarian (2019–2021) ===
Hamza received the eighth position on the PDK's list in the 2019 Kosovan parliamentary election, finished in sixth place among the party's candidates, and was elected to a second term in the assembly when the list won twenty-four seats. The PDK served in opposition in the parliament that followed. In his second term, Hamza was head of the PDK's parliamentary group, the chair of the public finance oversight committee, and a member of the committee on budget and transfers.

He was promoted to the fourth position on the PDK list in the 2021 parliamentary election, finished in third place, and was re-elected when the list won nineteen seats. The party continued to serve in opposition. Hamza became a deputy speaker of the assembly in 2021.

=== Mayor of South Mitrovica (2021–2025) ===
Hamza was elected as mayor of South Mitrovica in the 2021 Kosovan local elections, defeating incumbent Agim Bahtiri of Vetëvendosje in the first round of voting. By virtue of having won this position, he resigned from parliament on 1 November 2021.

One of Hamza's main promises in the 2021 local election was construction of the proposed "Ali Zeneli" road. The project was formally launched in August 2023, notwithstanding that it was not supported by the Republic of Kosovo government.

== 2025 Parliamentary Election ==
In the 2025 Kosovo parliamentary elections, Bedri Hamza ran with the Democratic Party of Kosovo (PDK). The election resulted in Vetëvendosje securing the largest share of the vote with approximately 40%, while PDK received around 21% of the vote.

== Electoral record ==
=== Local (South Mitrovica) ===
2021 Kosovan local elections: Mayor of South Mitrovica
Candidate	Party	Votes	%
Bedri Hamza	Democratic Party of Kosovo	16,566	53.69
Agim Bahtiri (incumbent)	Levizja Vetëvendosje!	10,654	34.53
Armend Agolli	Democratic League of Kosovo	3,636	11.78
Total		30,856	100.00
