= Jeton Zulfaj =

Kosovo Serb politician and diplomat

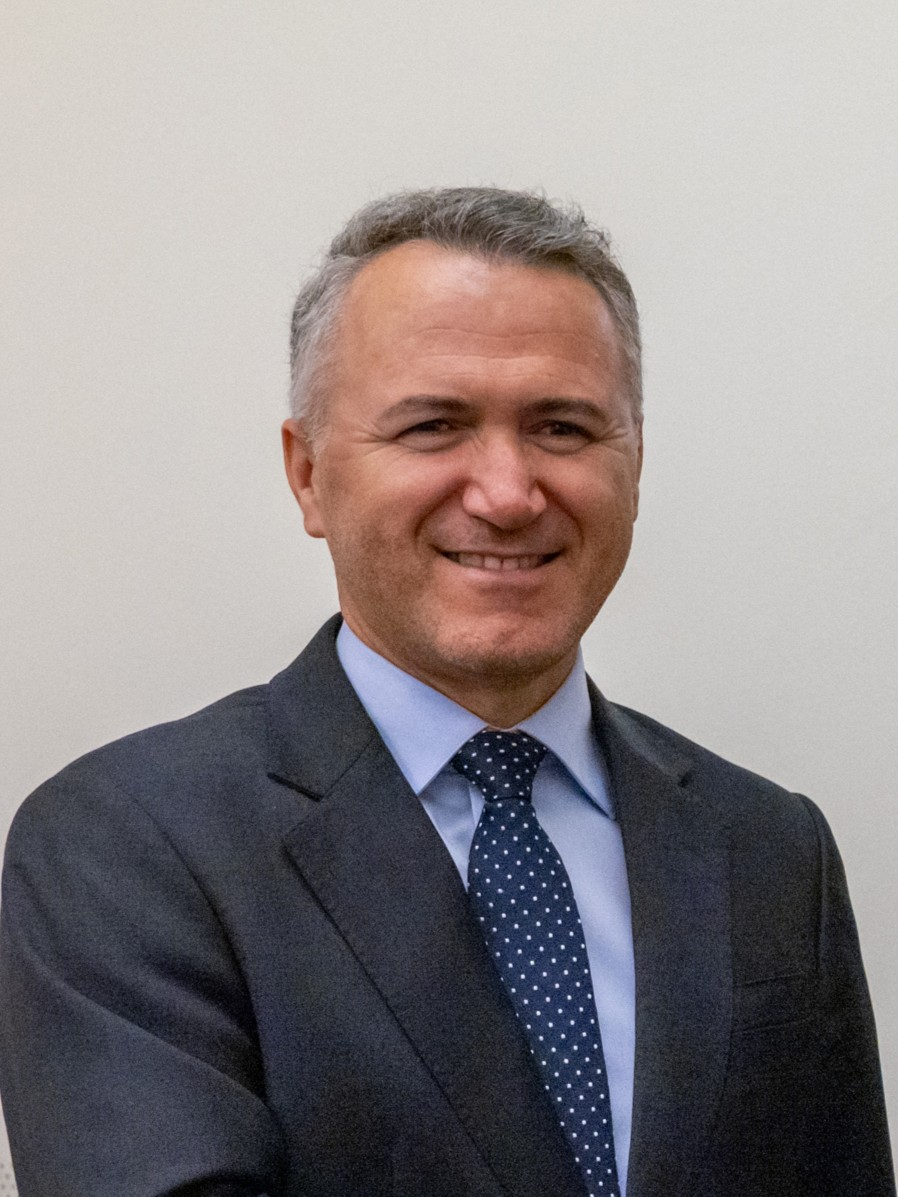
- Zulfaj in 2026

Chief Negotiator of the Republic of Kosovo with the European Union
- Incumbent
- Assumed office 20 March 2026
- Appointed by: Albin Kurti
- Preceded by: Besnik Bislimi

Personal details
- Party: Vetëvendosje
- Education: Lund University
- Occupation: Politician, diplomat

Jeton Zulfaj is a Kosovar politician and diplomat. A member of Vetëvendosje, he once held a position as an advisor of Albin Kurti and is now currently the chief negotiator for Kosovo with the European Union.

== Biography ==
Zulfaj graduated from Lund University with a Masters of European Affairs. He is also a recipient for scholarship from the Swedish Institute.

In March 2021, he was appointed as political advisor of the Kosovar Prime Minister Albin Kurti alongside Agon Hamza.

In March 2026, he was appointed the Chief Negotiator of the Republic of Kosovo with the European Union by Kurti, replacing Besnik Bislimi as the head. He also was appointed as the national coordinator for the Reform and Growth Facility for the Western Balkans.

He first held an introductory meeting with the heads of missions of the member states of the EU, where they discussed implementation of developmental reforms regarding Kosovo.
