= Besnik Bislimi =

Kosovar politician; Minister of Industry, Entrepreneurship and Trade (born 1971)

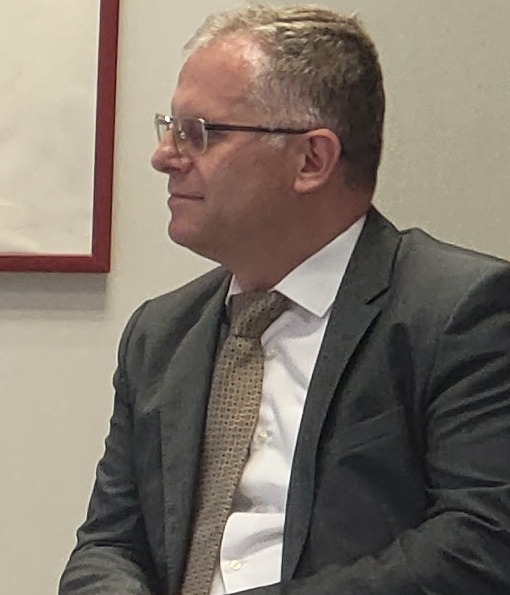
- Besnik Bislimi, 2022

First Deputy Prime Minister of Kosovo
- Incumbent
- Assumed office 22 March 2021 (Note: Caretaker since 23 March 2025)
- President: Glauk Konjufca (acting); Vjosa Osmani
- Prime Minister: Albin Kurti
- Preceded by: Besnik Tahiri

Minister of Finance and Transfers
- In office 4 February 2020 – 3 June 2020
- President: Hashim Thaçi
- Prime Minister: Albin Kurti
- Preceded by: Bedri Hamza
- Succeeded by: Hykmete Bajrami

Personal details
- Born: 19 May 1971 (age 54) Bukovik, Gjilan, SAP Kosovo, Yugoslavia (now Kosovo)
- Party: Vetëvendosje
- Spouse: Venera Bislimi
- Children: 1
- Education: University of Zagreb; University of Freiberg (PhD); Georgia State University (postdoc)

Besnik Bislimi (born May 19, 1971) is a Kosovar economist, academic and politician, currently serving as First Deputy Prime Minister of Kosovo, in charge of European integration, development and dialogue. He is also the first vice president of the Vetëvendosje movement, and has previously served as minister of finance and member of parliament.

== Biography ==
Bislimi studied macroeconomic analysis at the University of Zagreb, graduating in 1994. He received his doctorate from the University of Freiberg with a specialty in fiscal policies and transition to market economy. He was a Fulbright scholar at the Andrew Young School of Policy Studies of George State University in Atlanta, Georgia, where he completed post-doctoral studies on fiscal decentralization of developing nations.

Bislimi worked as an assistant for macroeconomics and public finance at the University of Freiberg for six years. He also supported the University of Prishtina with projects funded by the Stability Pact, the German DAAD and WUS Austria, served as the fiscal policy advisor of the UNDP CBF project, advisor on several GTZ projects, and FAO fiscal policy expert. Additionally, he has worked as a consultant and project manager for various institutions.

Since 2004, Bislimi has been a faculty member at RIT Kosovo (formerly American University in Kosovo), where he teaches macroeconomics, fiscal policy, monetary analysis and policy, natural resource economics and microeconomics. He has also served as head of the economics unit and managing director of the research center at RIT Kosovo, and taught part-time in Macedonia.

In the 2014 parliamentary elections, Bislimi was elected to the Assembly of Kosovo, representing Lëvizja Vetëvendosje, and served as chairman of the public finance oversight committee. He resigned from the Assembly in June 2016. He served as minister of finance in the first Kurti government in 2020, and returned as first deputy prime minister in charge of European integration, development and dialogue in the second Kurti government in March 2021.
