= Faton Peci =

Kosovar Albanian politician

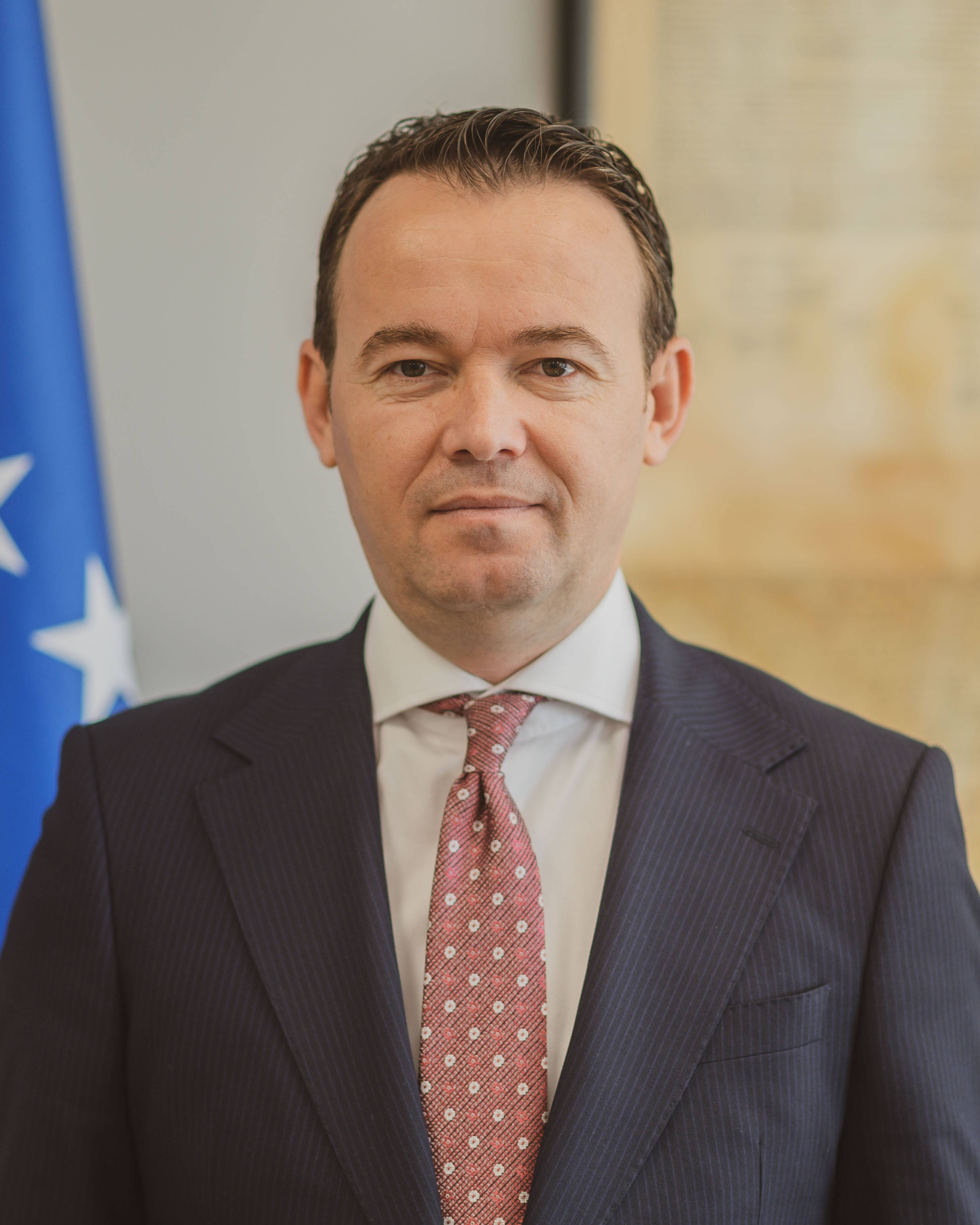
- Official portrait, 2021

Mayor of South Mitrovica
- Incumbent
- Assumed office 12 December 2025
- Preceded by: Bedri Hamza

Ministry of Agriculture, Forestry and Rural Development
- In office 22 March 2021 (Note: Caretaker since 23 March 2025) – 12 December 2025
- President: Glauk Konjufca (acting); Vjosa Osmani
- Prime Minister: Albin Kurti
- Deputy: Imri Demelezi
- Preceded by: Besian Mustafa

Personal details
- Born: 16 June 1982 (age 43) Titova Mitrovica, SR Serbia, SFR Yugoslavia (now Kosovo)
- Party: Guxo
- Education: University of Prishtina

Faton Peci (born 16 June 1982) is a Kosovar politician and current minister of Agriculture, Forestry and Rural Development of the Republic of Kosovo. He is one the leaders of the Guxo party since 2022.

== Electoral record ==
=== Local (Mitrovica) ===
Mayoral results
Candidate	Party	First round		Second round	
Candidate	Party	Votes	%	Votes	%
Faton Peci	Vetëvendosje; Guxo	15,830	47.94	18,235	53.67
Arian Tahiri	Democratic Party of Kosovo	15,708	47.57	15,743	46.33
Gëzim Plakolli	Democratic League of Kosovo	1,225	3.71		
Qazim Nimani	Alliance for the Future of Kosovo	255	0.77		
Total		33,018	100.00	33,978	100.00
