= Donika Gërvalla-Schwarz =

Kosovan politician (born 1971)

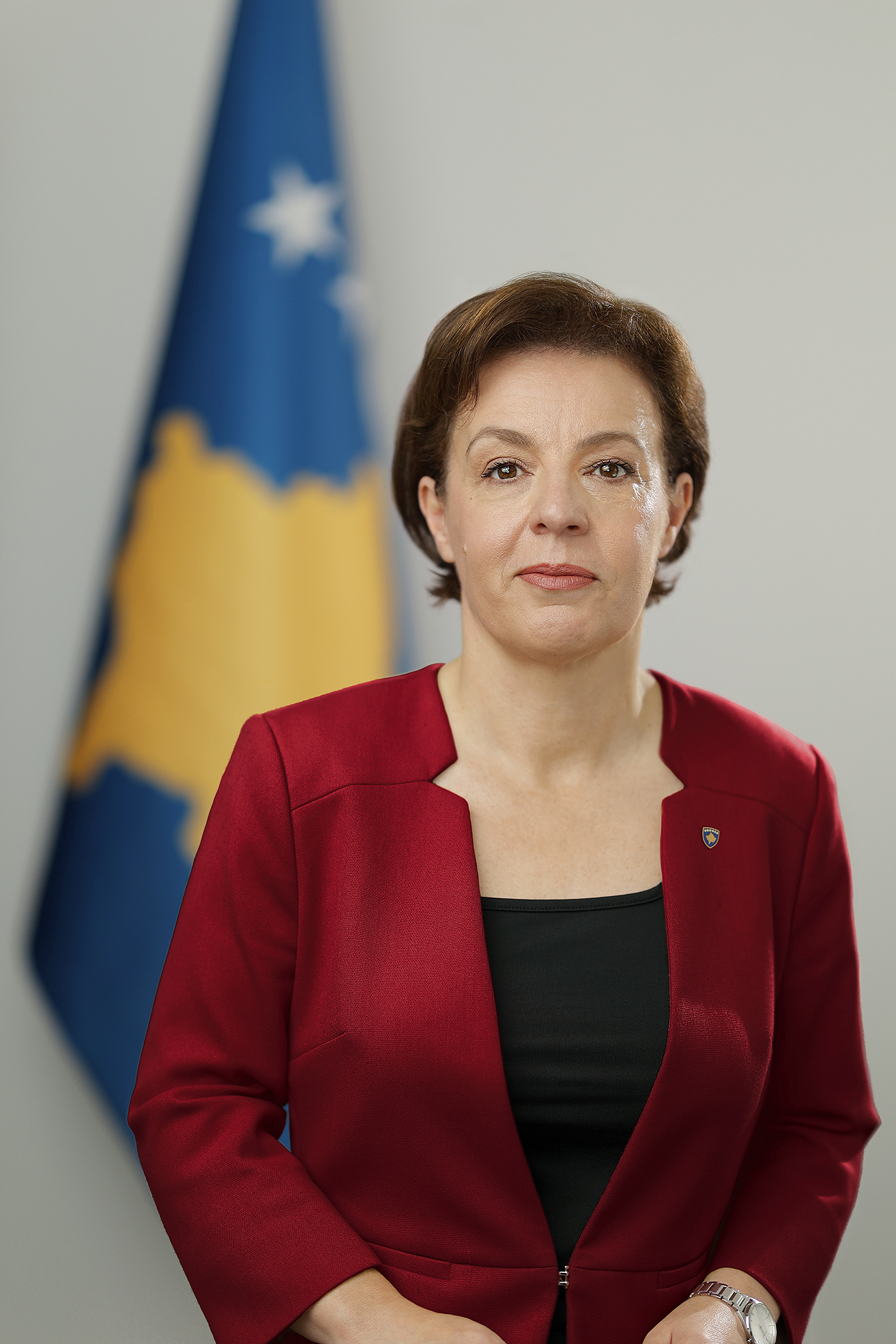
- Official portrait, 2022

Second Deputy Prime Minister of Kosovo
- Incumbent
- Assumed office 22 March 2021
- President: Glauk Konjufca (Acting); Vjosa Osmani; Albulena Haxhiu (acting)
- Prime Minister: Albin Kurti
- Preceded by: Driton Selmanaj

Minister of Justice
- Incumbent
- Assumed office 11 February 2026
- Prime Minister: Albin Kurti
- Deputy: Genc Nimoni
- Preceded by: Albulena Haxhiu; Blerim Sallahu (Acting)

8th Minister of Foreign Affairs
- In office 22 March 2021 – 11 February 2026
- President: Glauk Konjufca (Acting); Vjosa Osmani
- Prime Minister: Albin Kurti
- Preceded by: Meliza Haradinaj-Stublla; Besnik Tahiri (Acting)
- Succeeded by: Glauk Konjufca

Personal details
- Born: Donika Gërvalla; 16 October 1971 (age 54) Skopje, SR Macedonia, SFR Yugoslavia
- Party: Guxo (2021–present)
- Other political affiliations: Democratic League of Kosovo (until 2020)
- Spouse: Stefan Schwarz
- Children: 5
- Parent: Jusuf Gërvalla (father)
- Education: University of Hamburg

Donika Gërvalla-Schwarz (born 16 October 1971) is a Kosovar politician. A member of the Guxo political list of the Vetëvendosje political party, she has served as Minister of Foreign Affairs and Second Deputy Prime Minister in the Second Kurti cabinet since 2021. Gërvalla-Schwarz is the daughter of assassinated Albanian activist Jusuf Gërvalla. She is the president of the centre-right political party Guxo!.

== Early life and education ==
Gërvalla-Schwarz was born in Skopje – present-day North Macedonia – to a Kosovo Albanian family. Her father was activist Jusuf Gërvalla, who advocated for Albanian nationalism and Marxism–Leninism. Gërvalla-Schwarz was raised in Pristina, but fled with her family to West Germany in 1980, due to political persecution faced by her father at the hands of the Yugoslav secret police. In 1982, her father was assassinated in Untergruppenbach, and the family subsequently fled to Tirana shortly afterwards.

Gërvalla-Schwarz spent the remainder of her upbringing in Tirana, where she participated in student-led protests against the communist regime in Albania. Gërvalla-Schwarz studied music in Tirana until returning to Germany in 1992, in order to finish her education. She later received a law degree from the University of Hamburg.

== Political career ==
Gërvalla-Schwarz became an honorary member of the Democratic League of Kosovo in 1991. She later served as deputy chairperson of the party from 1993 until 1997, and then served as speaker of the party's German branch until 1999. As speaker of the party in Germany, Gërvalla-Schwarz made frequent appearances in German media and politics on behalf of Kosovo during the Kosovo War.

In 2015, Gërvalla-Schwarz returned to politics and was elected chairperson of the party's German branch again. Working closely with Kosovan politician Vjosa Osmani, the two attempted to enact reforms within the party. In 2018, Gërvalla-Schwarz resigned all of her leadership positions within the party, and later resigned her party membership in 2020. In 2021, Gërvalla-Schwarz joined the newly-formed Guxo political list, and was selected to stand as a candidate in the 2021 Kosovan parliamentary election. She was ultimately elected to the Assembly, but resigned her seat after being nominated by Albin Kurti to serve as second deputy prime minister and foreign affairs minister in his second cabinet. Following the inauguration of Osmani as president of Kosovo in April 2021, Gërvalla-Schwarz became the leader of Guxo!, as the Constitution of Kosovo forbids the president from acting as a representative of a political party.

Gërvalla-Schwarz criticized the politicization in the Foreign Ministry of Kosovo, how diplomats were appointed due to their connections rather than their competence, leading Kosovo's diplomats "not [to be] taken seriously by countries throughout the world". She said that one of her priorities is depoliticizing the ministry, but that "We cannot solve all these problems within a day".

== Personal life ==
Gërvalla-Schwarz is married to German politician Stefan Schwarz, and together they have five children. Schwarz is a former member of the Bundestag from 1990 until 1994, representing the Christian Democratic Union. The family resided in Bonn, although Gërvalla-Schwarz returned to Kosovo in 2021, ahead of the 2021 Kosovan parliamentary election.
