= Meliza Haradinaj-Stublla =

Kosovan politician

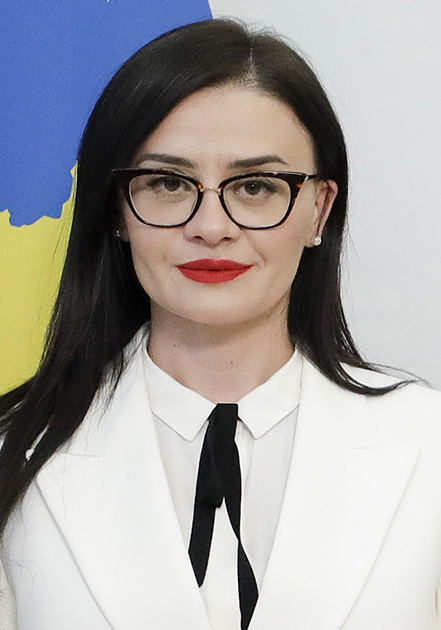
- Haradinaj-Stublla in 2020

Minister of Foreign Affairs
- In office 3 June 2020 – 9 March 2021
- Prime Minister: Avdullah Hoti
- Preceded by: Glauk Konjufca
- Succeeded by: Donika Gërvalla-Schwarz

Personal details
- Born: Pristina, SR Serbia, SFR Yugoslavia (now Kosovo); 1984 (age 41–42)
- Education: University of Oxford

Meliza Haradinaj-Stublla (born 1984) is a Kosovan politician who served as Minister of Foreign Affairs from 2020 to 2021 and as leader of the Alliance for the Future of Kosovo.

== Career ==
Haradinaj-Stublla studied Public Policy at the American University in Kosovo. She subsequently studied Diplomacy at the University of Oxford, supported by a Chevening Scholarship. From 2009 to 2013 she was a member of the Pristina City Council. After that, she was a political advisor in the cabinet of Kosovar Prime Minister Ramush Haradinaj, who was in office from 2017 to 2019.

During the government of Avdullah Hoti (in office since 3 June 2020) she was Minister for Foreign Affairs and Kosovars Abroad. Under her tenure, in February 2021 Kosovo and Israel formally established diplomatic relations. Parts of the agreement included humanitarian support for Kosovo from Israel, and a promise from Kosovo to locate their future embassy in Jerusalem, rather than Tel Aviv.

On 9 March 2021, she resigned as Kosovo's foreign minister and also as leader of the Alliance for the Future of Kosovo (AAK) party, due to allegations that her husband had bribed electoral officials to secure her election to parliament. She described her resignation as necessary to work on her legal defence and that the accusations were defamation of character.

== Personal life ==
Haradinaj-Stublla is married to Dardan Stublla and has two children.
