= Driton Selmanaj =

Albanian politician

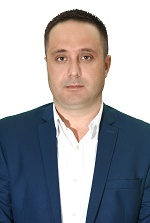

Deputy Prime Minister of Kosovo
- In office 3 June 2020 – 22 March 2021
- Preceded by: Haki Abazi
- Succeeded by: Donika Gërvalla-Schwarz
- Prime Minister: Avdullah Hoti

Personal details
- Born: 3 September 1979 (age 46) Prizren, SFR Yugoslavia
- Party: Democratic League

Driton Selmanaj (born 3 September 1979) is a Kosovo-Albanian politician.

== Career ==
Selamanj was named on 3 June 2020, from the prime minister Avdullah Hoti as the new Deputy Prime Minister of Kosovo, after the fall of the Cabinet of Albin Kurti.
