= Goran Rakić =

Kosovo Serb politician

- Горан Ракић
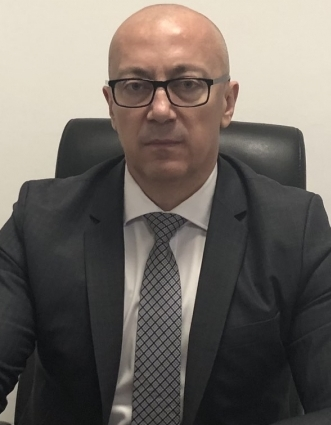
- Goran Rakić in March 2021

Member of the National Assembly of Serbia
- Incumbent
- Assumed office 6 February 2024

Minister for Communities and Returns of Kosovo
- In office 22 March 2021 – 5 November 2022
- Prime Minister: Albin Kurti
- Preceded by: Dalibor Jevtić
- Succeeded by: Nenad Rašić

Deputy Prime Minister of Kosovo
- In office 3 June 2020 – 22 March 2021
- Prime Minister: Avdullah Hoti
- Succeeded by: Emilija Redžepi

Minister of Administration and Local Government of Kosovo
- In office 3 June 2020 – 22 March 2021
- Prime Minister: Avdullah Hoti
- Preceded by: Emilija Redžepi
- Succeeded by: Elbert Krasniqi

Mayor of North Mitrovica
- In office 23 February 2014 – 3 June 2020
- Preceded by: Krstimir Pantić
- Succeeded by: Aleksandar Spirić (acting)

Personal details
- Born: 1971 (age 54–55) Kosovska Mitrovica, SFR Yugoslavia (now Kosovo)
- Citizenship: Serbian; Kosovar
- Party: Serbian Progressive Party
- Other political affiliations: Serb List
- Children: 2
- Education: University of Priština

Goran Rakić (Serbian Cyrillic: Горан Ракић, Albanian: Goran Rakiq; born 1971) is a Kosovan-Serbian politician serving as a member of the National Assembly since 6 February 2024.

A Kosovo Serb, he previously served as the minister for communities and returns in the Government of Kosovo from 22 March 2021 until his resignation on 5 November 2022. Prior to this, he served as the deputy prime minister of Kosovo and as the minister of administration and local government. He is a former mayor of North Mitrovica and the former president of the Serb List, an ethnic Serb minority political party.

== Early life ==
Goran Rakić was born in 1971 in Kosovska Mitrovica, which was then a part of the SFR Yugoslavia, to an ethnic Serb family. He graduated from the Faculty of Economics, University of Priština. For a period of time, he worked as a firefighter and was the director of JKP "Standard" Kosovska Mitrovica, a utility company.

== Political career ==
=== Serb List and Kosovo politics ===
He has been performing the function of the mayor of the municipality of North Mitrovica after swearing an oath to the Republic of Kosovo in 2014. He won his second four-year term in 2017 Kosovan local elections. Since 2017, Rakic has been the president of the Serb List, which has power in all ten Serb-majority municipalities, as well as all ten guaranteed seats in the Assembly of Kosovo for the Serb community. He is also the president of the municipality board of the Serbian Progressive Party (SNS) in North Mitrovica.

In the summer of 2017, Rakić and Milan Radoičić, a vice president of the Serb List met with Behgjet Pacolli, a former Minister of Foreign Affairs of Kosovo in Budva to discuss the possibility of the Serb List joining the government of Kosovo and supporting Ramush Haradinaj as the prime minister.

In January 2019, he said that Serbs will never allow the reunification of North and South Mitrovica as that would be a cover for ethnic cleansing against the Kosovo Serbs.

On 3 June 2020, he took the office of one of the Deputy Prime Ministers and the Minister of Administration and Local Government in the Hoti cabinet.

In July 2020, Serb List caused a controversy in Kosovo by announcing that they will support Serbia's COVID-19 curfew measures and have vowed to locally implement them in Kosovo. They also vowed to support Aleksandar Vučić in the “fight” for Kosovo during the dialogue. Shortly after, a parliamentary resolution initiated by Vjosa Osmani, the Speaker of the Parliament, condemning a statement by the Serb List failed to pass.

On 27 July 2020, Serbian Anti-Corruption Agency started an investigation against Rakić and other high ranking Serb officials in Kosovo due to the suspicion that they violated the law because they did not report their property and income to the Anti-Corruption Agency.

On 22 March 2021, Rakić took office of the Minister for Communities and Returns in the second Kurti cabinet. He announced his resignation from this position on 5 November 2022.

On 24 October 2023, following the Banjska attack, Rakić was succeeded as SL president by Zlatan Elek.

=== Member of the National Assembly of Serbia ===
He appeared on the Serbian Progressive Party's electoral list in the 2023 parliamentary election and was elected to the National Assembly of Serbia. He was sworn in as MP on 6 February 2024.

== Personal life ==
He is married and has two children.

Government offices
Preceded by Dalibor Jevtić	Minister for Communities and Returns; 2021–2022	Succeeded by Nenad Rašić
Preceded by Emilija Redžepi	Minister of Administration and Local Government; 2020–2021	Succeeded by Elbert Krasniqi
Party political offices
Preceded by Slavko Simić	President of the Serb List; 2017–2023	Succeeded by Zlatan Elek
