= Second Kohl cabinet (Rhineland-Palatinate) =

Second Cabinet of Helmut Kohl Kohl II
- 10th Cabinet of Rhineland-Palatinate
- 19 May 1971 – 20 May 1975
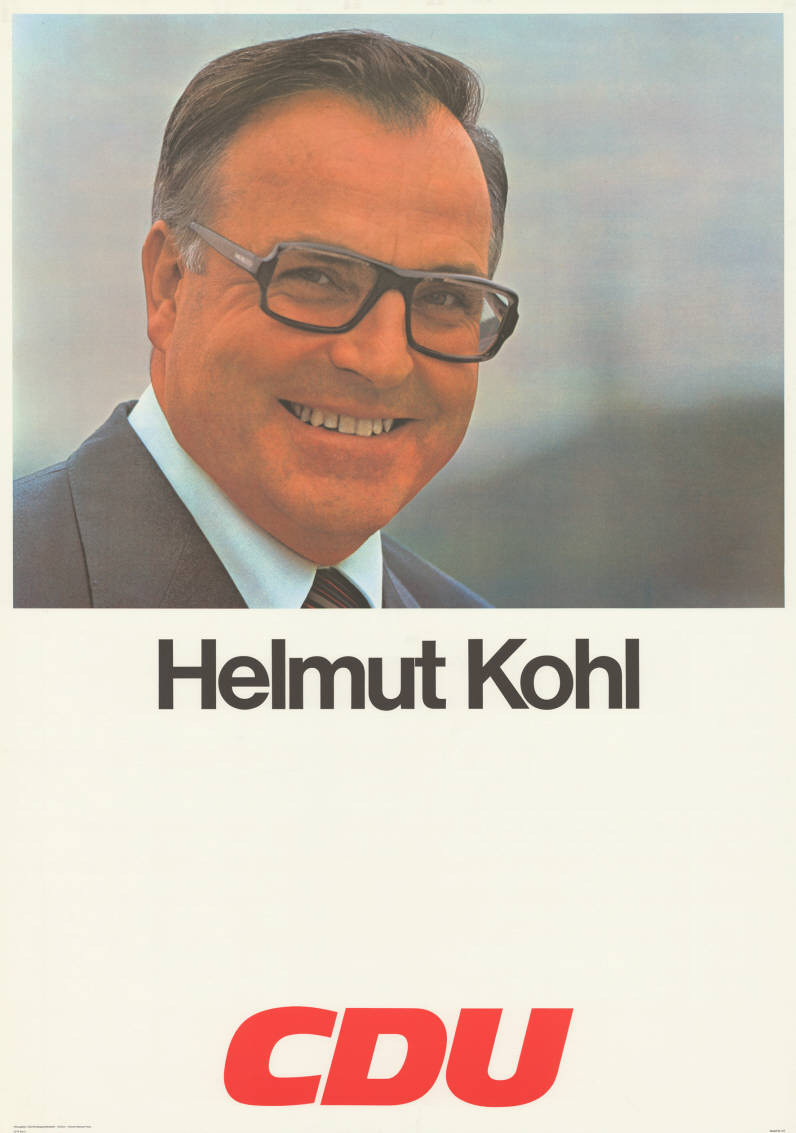
- Date formed: 19 May 1971
- Date dissolved: 20 May 1975 (4 years and 1 day)

People and organisations
- Chancellor: Willy Brandt (until 1974); Helmut Schmidt (from 1974)
- Minister President: Helmut Kohl
- Deputy Minister President: Otto Meyer
- Member party: Christian Democratic Union
- Opposition party: Social Democratic Party; Free Democratic Party
- Opposition leader: Social Democratic Party

History
- Election: 1971 Rhineland-Palatinate state election
- Legislature term: 7th Landtag of Lower Saxony
- Predecessor: Cabinet Kohl I
- Successor: Cabinet Kohl III

The Second Kohl cabinet was the state government of the German state of Rhineland-Palatinate from 19 May 1971 until 20 May 1975. The Cabinet was headed by Minister President Helmut Kohl and was formed by the Christian Democratic Union. On 19 May 1971 Kohl was elected and sworn in as Minister President by the Landtag of Rhineland-Palatinate. It was succeeded by Kohl's third and last cabinet.

== Composition ==
Cabinet members
Portfolio	Minister	Took office	Left office	Party
Minister President	Helmut Kohl	19 May 1971	20 May 1975	CDU
Deputy Minister President; Agriculture, viticulture and environmental protection	Otto Meyer	19 May 1971	20 May 1975	CDU
Minister of the Interior	Heinz Schwarz	19 May 1971	20 May 1975	CDU
Minister of Justice	Otto Theisen	19 May 1971	20 May 1975	CDU
Minister of Finance	Johann Wilhelm Gaddum	19 May 1971	20 May 1975	CDU
Minister of Culture	Bernhard Vogel	19 May 1971	20 May 1975	CDU
Minister of Economy and Transport	Heinrich Holkenbrink	19 May 1971	20 May 1975	CDU
Minister of Social Affairs, Health and Sports	Heiner Geißler	19 May 1971	20 May 1975	CDU
