= Albulena Balaj-Halimaj =

Albanian politician

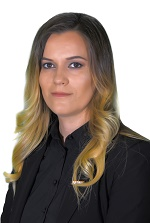
- Balaj-Halimaj in 2017

Deputy Prime Minister of Kosovo
- In office 3 June 2020 – 22 March 2021
- President: Vjosa Osmani
- Prime Minister: Avdullah Hoti
- Preceded by: Fatmir Limaj
- Succeeded by: Emilija Redžepi

Personal details
- Born: Kosovo
- Party: NISMA

Albulena Balaj-Halimaj is a Kosovo-Albanian politician and NISMA member.

== Career ==
Balaj-Halimaj was named on 3 June 2020 Avdullah Hoti's cabinet as one of the deputy prime ministers. She remained in that position until 22 March 2021.
