= Third Kohl cabinet (Rhineland-Palatinate) =

Government of a German state

Third Cabinet of Helmut Kohl Kohl III
- 11th Cabinet of Rhineland-Palatinate
- 19 May 1969 – 20 May 1975
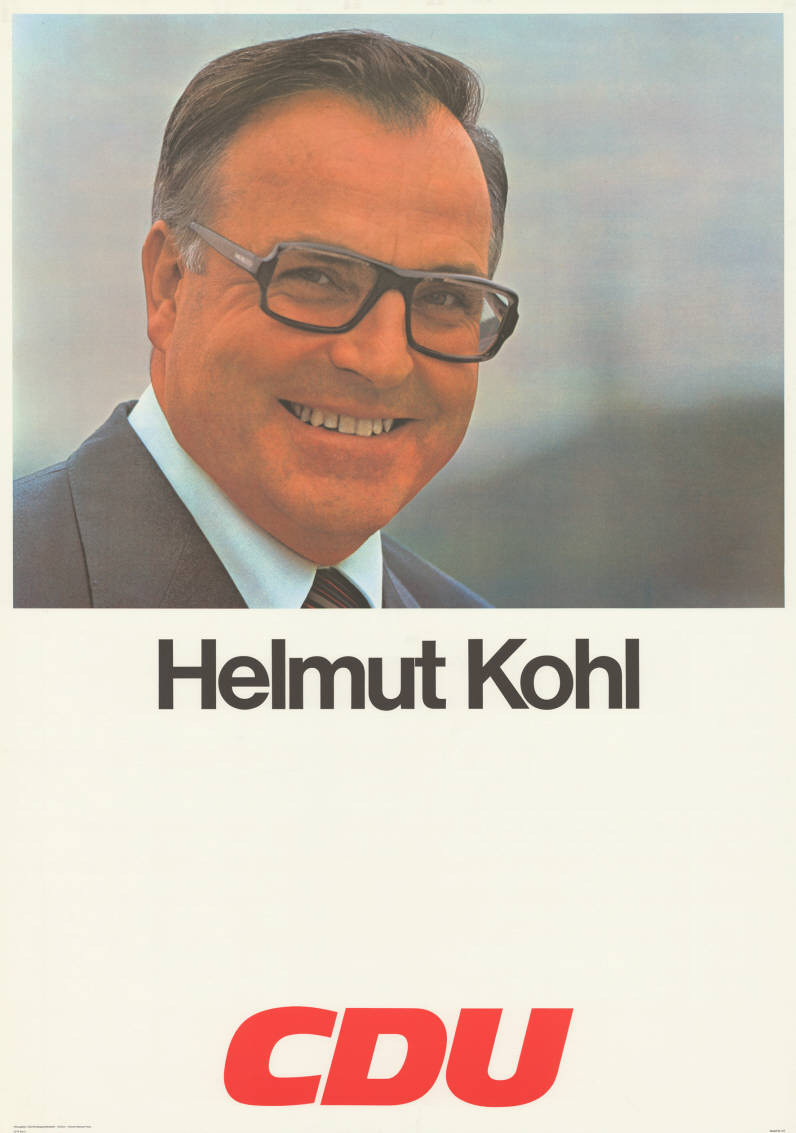
- Date formed: 20 May 1975
- Date dissolved: 2 December 1976 (1 year, 6 months, 1 week and 5 days)

People and organisations
- Chancellor: Helmut Schmidt
- Minister President: Helmut Kohl
- Deputy Minister President: Otto Meyer
- Member party: Christian Democratic Union
- Opposition party: Social Democratic Party; Free Democratic Party
- Opposition leader: Social Democratic Party

History
- Election: 1975 Rhineland-Palatinate state election
- Legislature term: 8th Landtag of Lower Saxony
- Predecessor: Cabinet Kohl I
- Successor: Cabinet Vogel I

The Third Kohl cabinet was the state government of the German state of Rhineland-Palatinate from 20 May 1975 until 2 December 1976. The Cabinet was headed by Minister President Helmut Kohl and was formed by the Christian Democratic Union. On 20 May 1975 Kohl was elected and sworn in as Minister President by the Landtag of Rhineland-Palatinate.

The reason for the short term was that Kohl switched to federal politics: he was the Union’s candidate for chancellor in the 1976 West German federal election, was elected to the Bundestag for the first time and then resigned as Minister President of Rhineland-Palatinate.

== Composition ==
Cabinet members
Portfolio	Minister	Took office	Left office	Party
Minister President	Helmut Kohl	20 May 1975	2 December 1976	CDU
Deputy Minister President; Agriculture, viticulture and environmental protection	Otto Meyer	20 May 1975	2 December 1976	CDU
Minister of the Interior	Heinz Schwarz	20 May 1975	2 December 1976	CDU
Minister of Justice	Otto Theisen	20 May 1975	2 December 1976	CDU
Minister of Finance	Johann Wilhelm Gaddum	20 May 1975	2 December 1976	CDU
Minister of Culture	Bernhard Vogel	20 May 1975	2 December 1976	CDU
Minister of Economy and Transport	Heinrich Holkenbrink	20 May 1975	2 December 1976	CDU
Minister of Social Affairs, Health and Sports	Heiner Geißler	20 May 1975	2 December 1976	CDU
