= Dalibor Jevtić =

Kosovar politician

- Далибор Јевтић; Dalibor Jevtiq
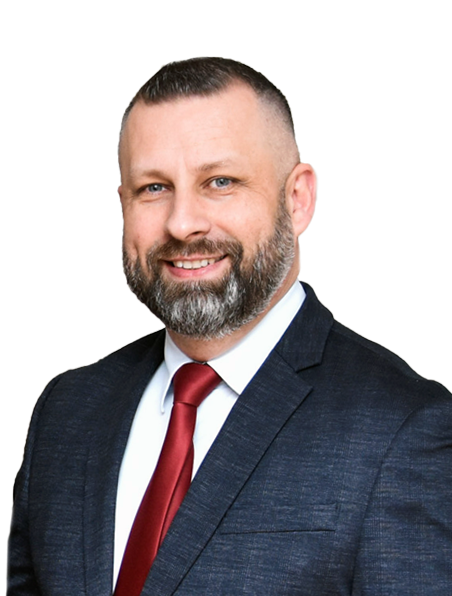
- Dalibor Jevtić

Minister for Communities and Return
- In office April 2015 – 22 March 2021
- Prime Minister: Isa Mustafa; Ramush Haradinaj; Albin Kurti; Avdullah Hoti
- Succeeded by: Goran Rakić
- In office March 2013 – December 2014
- Prime Minister: Hashim Thaçi

Deputy Prime Minister of Kosovo
- In office 9 September 2017 – 3 February 2020
- Prime Minister: Ramush Haradinaj

Deputy Mayor of Štrpce
- In office March 2015 – April 2015

Personal details
- Born: 31 March 1978 (age 48) Pristina, SR Serbia, SFR Yugoslavia
- Party: Serb List (2015-present); Earlier: Independent Liberal Party (2009—2014)
- Other political affiliations: Serbian Progressive Party (2015-present)
- Website: www.daliborjevtic.com

Dalibor Jevtić (Serbian Cyrillic: Далибор Јевтић, Albanian: Dalibor Jevtiq, born 31 March 1978) is a Kosovo Serb politician. He was formerly the Deputy Mayor of Štrpce as well as the Deputy Prime Minister of Kosovo, and the former Minister for Communities and Return in the Government of Kosovo. He is a vice president of the Serb List.

== Biography ==
Dalibor Jevtić was born on 31 March 1978 in Pristina, SFR Yugoslavia (Now Kosovo), to a Serb family, where he lived until 1980. He finished elementary and high school in Smederevo. In September 1999 he decided to return to Kosovo at a time when many Serbs were leaving this province. In April 2000 he started to work for an American company KBR, Inc. at Camp Bondsteel, near Ferizaj, simultaneously finishing college. From March 2006 to September 2009 he worked in Iraq for the same company as the manager of a military base the US Army.

He has received several awards from the US Government and US Army for his contributions while working in Kosovo and in Iraq as a project manager supporting peacekeeping missions in those regions.

== Political career ==
He began his political career at the local elections in Štrpce in October 2009 as a member of the Independent Liberal Party (SLS). He started working as an adviser and head of the Cabinet of the Mayor of Štrpce municipality. In February 2010 he became a senior official of the SLS when he was elected party director.

In March 2010 he took up the position of Executive Director and Director of Public Relations in Štrpce, until March 2013 when he assumed the office of Minister for Communities and Return in the Republic of Kosovo government. As the Minister dealt with the problems of returnees but especially worked on the survival of the Serb people in Kosovo, more than 400 houses were built during his tenure. He also formed several projects to assist returnees.

After the election of 2014 and the end of the mandate of the Government of Kosovo, he returned to the local government, becoming Deputy Mayor of Štrpce in March 2015. In April that year, on the proposal of the Serb List, he returned to the head of the Ministry for Communities and Return where he stayed until September 2017. In September 2015, he joined the Serbian Progressive Party following disagreements on policy with the SLS.

From September 2017 to February 2020, he held the positions of Deputy Prime Minister of Kosovo and Minister for Communities and Return.

== Awards ==
- Gramata Holy Synod of the Serbian Orthodox Church (September 2014)
- Manager of the year 2008 KBR
- Dozens of awards and plaques of appreciation (2000–2016)
