= RIT Kosovo =

Private university located in the Germia district of Pristina, Kosovo

Coordinates: 42.6702°N 21.1921°E

- Established: 2002
- Affiliations: Rochester Institute of Technology
- Chancellor: Richard S. Lukaj (Chairman)
- Students: ~500
- Location: Pristina, Kosovo
- Website: www.rit.edu/kosovo/

The Rochester Institute of Technology Kosovo, previously known as the American University in Kosovo, is a private university located in the Germia district of Pristina, Kosovo. The university was established in 2002 and is part of the Rochester Institute of Technology (RIT) in the Rochester, New York, metropolitan area.

== History ==
Founded in 2002, RIT Kosovo (previously named the American University in Kosovo) is a not-for-profit, higher education institution chartered in Kosovo and offering degrees from the Rochester Institute of Technology (RIT, founded 1829) in Rochester, New York.

It was previously named the American College of Kosova, American University in Kosova Foundation, American University in Kosova Foundation – Prishtina and BPrAL American College in Kosova Foundation – Prishtina”. It was first registered on May 8, 2002, in Prishtina, Kosovo. RIT/AUK is supported by the U.S. organization "the American University in Kosovo Foundation Inc", registered in the County of New York, State of New York.

== Campus and alumni ==
The campus occupies 2.1 hectares (5.19 acres) in the Germia neighborhood of the capital city, Prishtina, in the Republic of Kosovo.

Alumni number more than 900.

== Governance ==
The Board of Trustees is composed of individuals who guide and support the institution toward its mission and carries out fiduciary duties and other responsibilities. The Academic Senate provides for the exercise of the faculty's role in academic decisions, the preservation of academic standards, and the promotion of the academic welfare of students. The Student Government works to improve the quality of students’ life at RIT/AUK and serves as the instrument through which the students influence decisions about student activities, roles, and curricula.

Cooperative education provides two paid career-related work experiences for every graduate who completes the bachelor's degree program.

== Degrees offered ==
Degrees offered are Bachelor of Science (BS) in Applied Arts and Science (4 year degree program) and an associate degree (AAS) in Multimedia and Web Design (2 year degree program). RIT/AUK students enrolled in Kosovo receive their degree from RIT through the RIT School of Individualized Study.

== Accreditation ==
RIT is chartered by the legislature of the state of New York in the United States of America, accredited by the Middle States Association of Colleges and Schools. In addition, individual colleges have professional accreditation for specific programs. RIT/AUK degrees are therefore accredited by the Middle States Association of Colleges and Schools. Additionally, in Kosovo, RIT/AUK (AUK – The American College of Kosova) is licensed by the Kosovo Ministry of Education, Science and Technology (MEST) and accredited by the Kosovo Accreditation Agency (KAA).

== Funding ==
Initial funding for RIT/AUK came from the Fund for the Reconstruction of Kosovo, which itself was funded by voluntary contributions from the ethnic Albanian diaspora to support the underground parallel institutions operated within Kosovo during the period before the 1999 NATO bombing of the Federal Republic of Yugoslavia. Subsequent funding has been granted by the United States Agency for International Development (USAID); by the Mabetex construction company of Behgjet Pacolli; and by the National Albanian American Council (NAAC) in the United States.

== AUK Training and Development Institute ==
The Training and Development Institute at American University in Kosovo is a center for continuing education. AUK supports the reconstruction and transformation of Kosovo through the professional development of individuals, the advancement of learning methods and contents, business support, linking university expertise with the business community, and certification of skills with internationally recognized standards.

== AUK Summer program ==
AUK offers a summer program where undergraduate and graduate students learn about conflict management, reconstruction, humanitarian intervention, human rights, and other issues related to development in post-conflict societies. Students enrolled in the program have the opportunity to interact with international scholars, NGOs, diplomats, retired military personnel, peacekeepers, and others with experience in conflict transformations. The program focuses on the background of the Kosovo conflict of the late 20th century wars across the region; the nature of security in the period following the fighting, and continuing challenges to conflict transformation and development.

== Notable alumni ==
- Kreshnik Bekteshi, Minister of Economy of North Macedonia
- Meliza Haradinaj-Stublla, Minister of Foreign Affairs
- Hekuran Murati, Minister of Finance, Labor and Transfers of Kosovo
