= Jusuf Gërvalla =

Kosovo Albanian activist, writer and musician

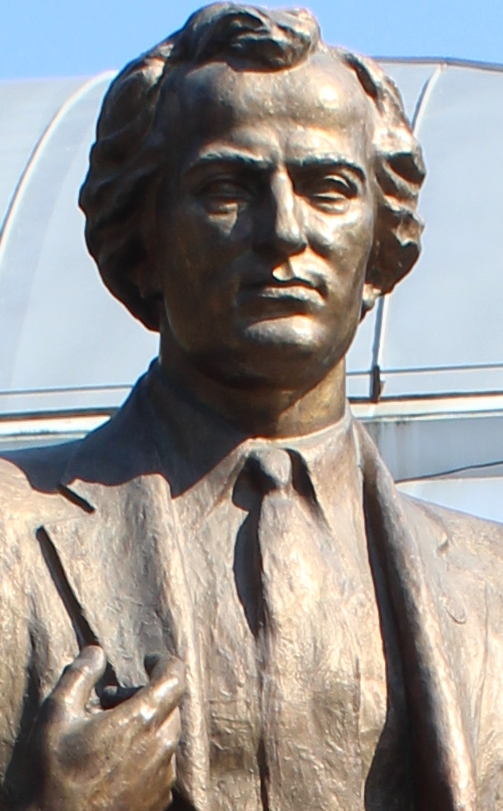
- Statue dedicated to Jusuf Gërvalla in Pejë
- Born: 1 October 1943; Dubovik, Deçan, Albanian Kingdom
- Died: 17 January 1982 (aged 38); Untergruppenbach, West Germany
- Cause of death: Assassination
- Education: University of Pristina; University of Ljubljana
- Occupations: Activist, journalist, musician and writer
- Movement: National Movement for the Liberation of Kosovo
- Opponent: Yugoslavia
- Spouse: Suzana Gërvalla
- Children: 3, including Donika
- Relatives: Bardhosh Gërvalla (brother)

Jusuf Gërvalla (October 1, 1943 – January 17, 1982) was a Kosovo Albanian activist, writer, musician, the founder of the group called National Movement for the Liberation of Kosovo.

== Biography ==
Born in the village Burrëmadh (Dubovik), in the municipality of Deçan, Gërvalla pursued a college education in Prishtina and Ljubljana before working as a journalist in Skopje and Prishtina. A vocal nationalist, he came under the radar of Yugoslav secret service, prompting him to seek asylum in Germany in 1980 where he subsequently established the Popular Movement for the Republic of Kosovo (Albanian: Lëvizja Popullore për Republikën e Kosovës), which later split into the two factions the People's Movement of Kosovo (Albanian: Lëvizja Popullore e Kosovës) and the National Movement for the Liberation of Kosovo (Albanian: Lëvizja Kombëtare për Çlirimin e Kosovës), the former being the forerunners of the, at the time, ideologically heterogeneous Kosovo Liberation Army. While abroad, he also made efforts to unite Albanian movements and political parties. On January 17, 1982, Gërvalla along with his brother Bardhosh Gërvalla, and fellow activist Kadri Zeka, were shot and killed in their car in a small town near Stuttgart, allegedly by members of the Yugoslav secret service. His murder caused outrage among Albanians and abroad, and led to an increased intensity in Albanian nationalism and hostility to Yugoslav control of Kosovo.

Some of his literary publications include Fluturojnë e bien ("They Fly and Fall"), Kanjushë e verdhë ("Green Stork") and Rrotull ("Around"). Gërvalla's daughter Donika Gërvalla-Schwarz is a politician in Kosovo, serving as minister of foreign affairs and second deputy prime minister in the second Kurti cabinet since 2021.
