= Ahmet Shala =

Kosovan politician

Ahmet Shala (Croatian: Ahmet Šalja) was the Minister of Economy and Finance in the Government of Kosovo from 2008 to 2011.

He also previously served as Ambassador to Japan.
