= Ratkoc, Rahovec =

Ratkoc: Ratkoc (Albanian); Ратковац/Ratkovac (Serbian)
- Village
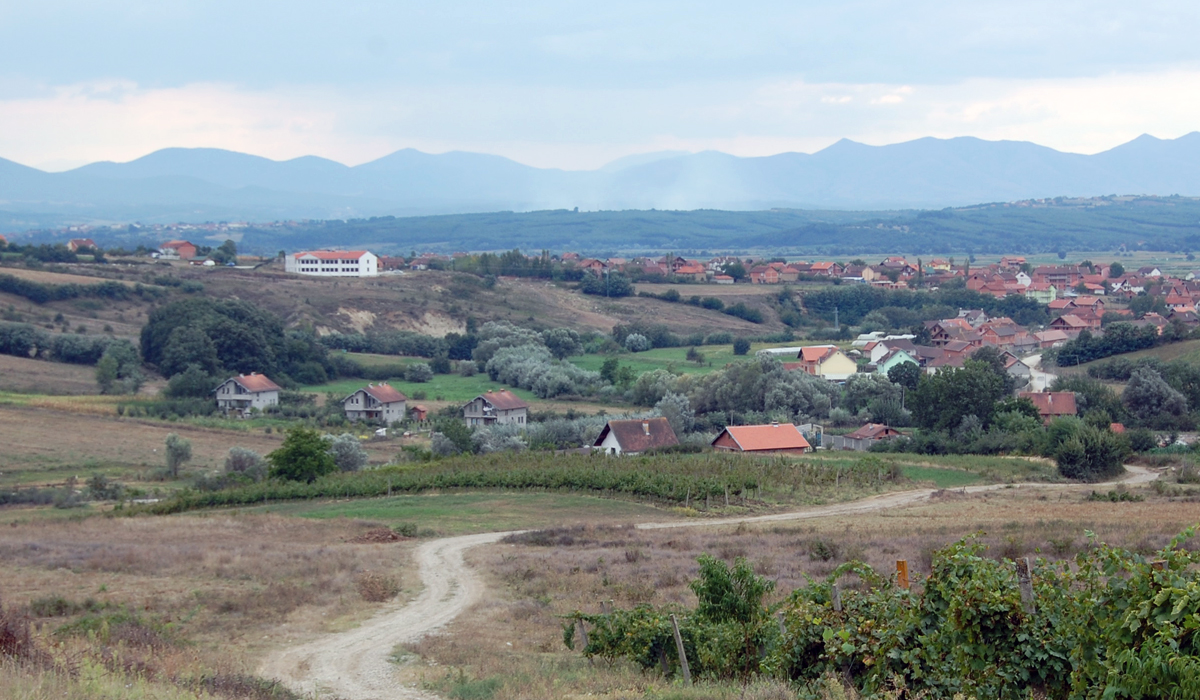

- Location in Kosovo
- Location: Kosovo
- District: Gjakova
- Municipality: Rahovec

Population (2024)
  - Total: 2,713
- Time zone: UTC+1 (CET)
  - Summer (DST): UTC+2 (CEST)

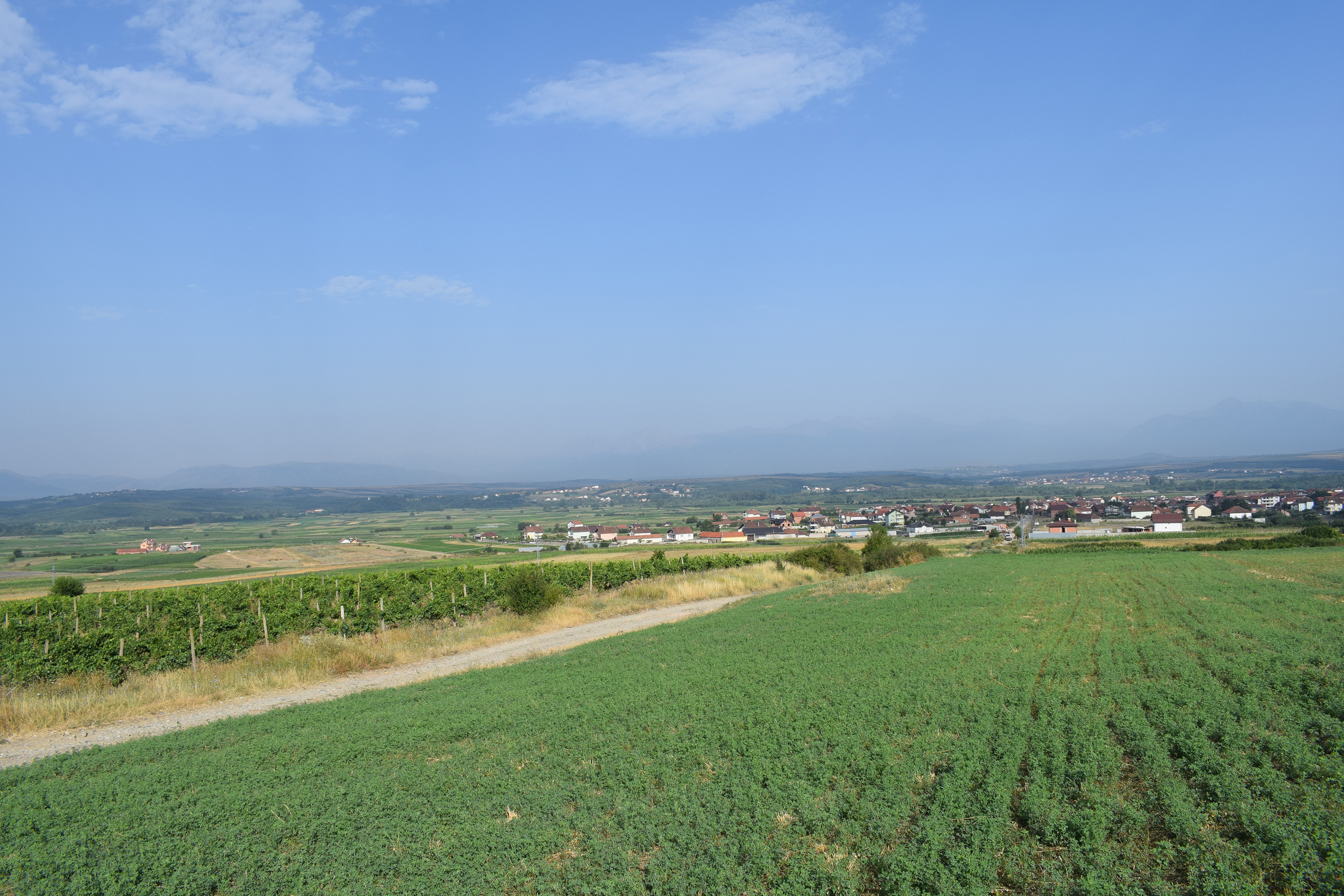

Ratkovac (Serbian: Ратковац) or Drinas (Albanian: Drinas), is a small village in Kosovo. The village is about 12 km (7 mi), by road, from the city of Gjakova, but only 2 km (1 mi) by geographical distance.

== History ==
The village was mentioned in the Ottoman defter of 1591 with 39 households. According to the Ottoman defter of 1591, the inhabitants anthroponymy were mainly Albanian, Albanian-Slavic along with a few Muslim names.

== Demographics ==
According to the 2024 Kosovo census, the village had a population of 2,713 inhabitants of which the overwhelming majority were ethnic Albanians.
