= Agim Krasniqi (politician) =

Albanian economist, civil servant, and politician

Agim Krasniqi is an Albanian economist, civil servant and politician in Kosovo, who served on various capacities in the Ministry of Finance. Following his tenure as director of the state aid department, he was appointed deputy minister of finance in January 2015. He then served as minister from August to September 2017. He was once again appointed deputy minister in 2020. Following Hykmete Bajrami's resignation on 24 February 2021, Krasniqi became acting minister until 22 March 2021, when he was succeeded by Hekuran Murati.
