= Ministry of Finance (Kosovo) =

Government ministry of Kosovo

- Ministria e Financave (Albanian)
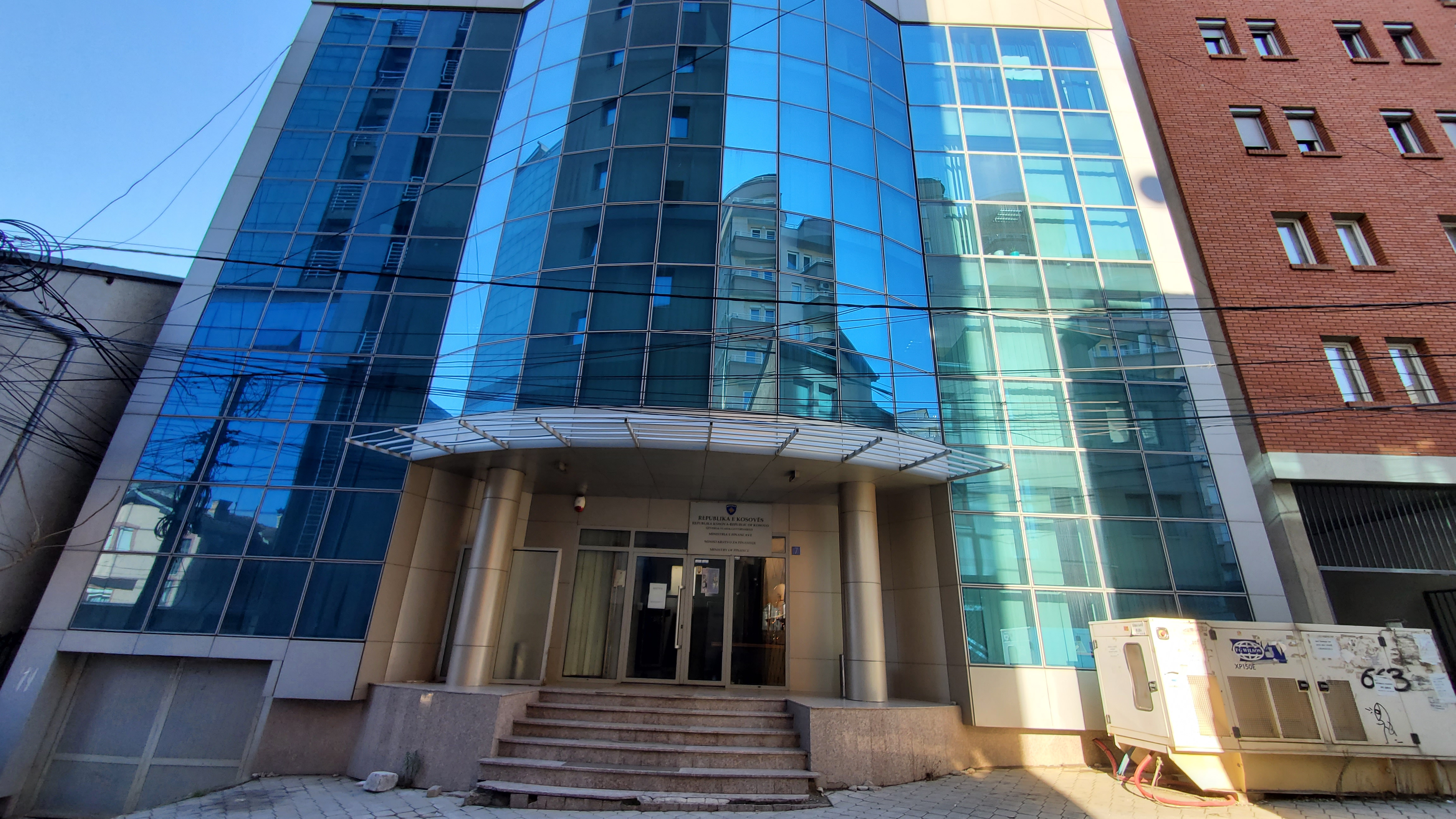

Ministry overview
- Formed: 2006
- Jurisdiction: Government of Kosovo
- Headquarters: Government Building, Floor 11, Mother Teresa Street, Pristina
- Minister responsible: Hekuran Murati, Minister of Finance
- Website: Official Website

The Ministry of Finance (Albanian: Ministria e Financave) of Kosovo is a department of the Government of Kosovo in charge of public finances of Kosovo. The headquarters are on Mother Teresa Street in Pristina.

== Officeholders (2008–present) ==
- Ahmet Shala, 10 January 2008 - 22 February 2011
- Bedri Hamza, 22 February 2011 - 9 December 2014
- Avdullah Hoti, 9 December 2014 - 7 August 2017
- Agim Krasniqi, 7 August 2017 - 9 September 2017
- Bedri Hamza, 9 September 2017 - 3 February 2020
- Besnik Bislimi, 3 February 2020 - 3 June 2020
- Hykmete Bajrami, 3 June 2020 - 24 February 2021
- Agim Krasniqi (acting), 24 February 2021 - 22 March 2021
- Hekuran Murati, 22 March 2021 - Incumbent

== See also ==
- Government of Kosovo
- Economy of Kosovo
