= Hykmete Bajrami =

Albanian politician

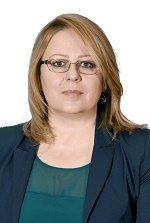

Minister of Finance of Kosovo
- In office 3 June 2020 – 24 February 2021
- President: Hashim Thaçi; Vjosa Osmani
- Prime Minister: Avdullah Hoti
- Preceded by: Besnik Bislimi
- Succeeded by: Agim Krasniqi (acting)

Minister of Education, Science and Technology
- In office 3 February 2020 – 3 June 2020
- Prime Minister: Albin Kurti
- Preceded by: Shyqyri Bytyqi
- Succeeded by: Ramë Likaj

Personal details
- Born: 11 May 1987 (age 38) Pristina, SAP Kosovo, SFR Yugoslavia (now Pristina, Kosovo)
- Party: LDK (since 2011)

Hykmete Bajrami (born 11 May 1987) is a Kosovar politician. She has been the Minister of Finance of Kosovo from June 2020. She was the Minister of Trade and Industry in the Government of Isa Mustafa of the Republic of Kosovo.

== Background ==
Early political career

Bajrami is a professor of marketing related topics at the University of Pristina. She completed her master's degree at Staffordshire University in the UK, and did her PhD studies at the University of Pristina. She was appointed to be Minister of Trade and Industry in the government created by PDK and LDK with the prime minister Isa Mustafa from the LDK.

=== Member of Parliament ===
Hykmete Bajrami was a member of Parliament when LDK was in opposition. She was known to be one of the main opponents of Hashim Thaçi government as well as one of the main opponents of having a strong opposition to form coalition with the PDK.
