= Avdullah Hoti =

Kosovan politician

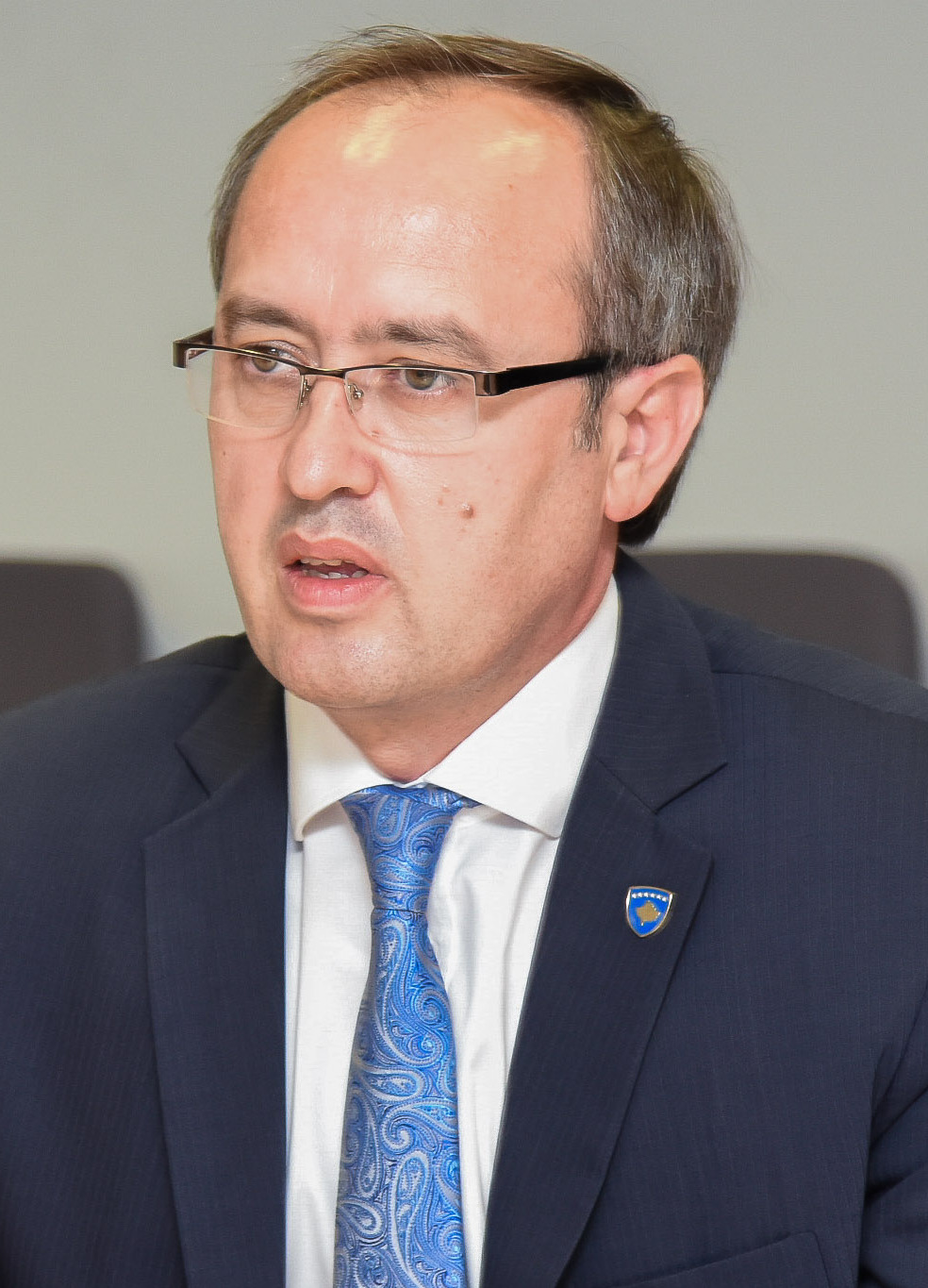
- Hoti in 2020

Prime Minister of Kosovo
- In office 3 June 2020 – 22 March 2021
- President: Hashim Thaçi; Vjosa Osmani (Acting)
- Deputy: Besnik Tahiri; Driton Selmanaj; Albulena Balaj-Halimaj; Goran Rakić
- Preceded by: Albin Kurti
- Succeeded by: Albin Kurti

First Deputy Prime Minister of Kosovo
- In office 3 February 2020 – 25 March 2020
- Prime Minister: Albin Kurti
- Preceded by: Behgjet Pacolli
- Succeeded by: Besnik Tahiri

Minister of Finance
- In office 8 December 2014 – 2 August 2017
- Prime Minister: Isa Mustafa
- Preceded by: Bedri Hamza
- Succeeded by: Agim Krasniqi

Member of the Assembly of the Republic of Kosovo
- Incumbent
- Assumed office 2014

Personal details
- Born: 4 February 1976 (age 50) Ratkovac, Yugoslavia (now Ratkoc, Kosovo)
- Party: Democratic League
- Spouse: Servete Ukaj Hoti
- Children: 2
- Education: University of Pristina; Staffordshire University

Avdullah Hoti (born 4 February 1976) is a Kosovan politician who served as Prime Minister of Kosovo from 2020 to 2021. He previously served as the minister of Finance of Kosovo between 2014 and 2017 in the PDK/LDK coalition government.

In September 2020, Hoti signed the agreement on normalisation of economic relations with Serbia and accession to the Mini Schengen Zone, as well as on mutual recognition between Kosovo and Israel and the establishment of diplomatic relations. He has an active role in the European Union-mediated negotiations between the governments of Serbia and Kosovo.

== Political career ==
He joined the political party LDK in 2006. He was elected as vice president of Pristina (Kosovo's capital) in the 2008 communal elections. He served until the next communal elections in 2013, when his party lost the city. In the next year, he was a candidate in the parliamentary elections as Minister of Finance and he was elected. He served in that position until 2017 when the government was voted out by a no-confidence motion. Then, he was the coalition's candidate for Prime Minister of Kosovo in the Kosovan parliamentary election of 2017. He became the head of the LDK parliamentary group from 2017 until 2020, when he took office as First Deputy Prime Minister. He was nominated by the LDK to be his party's nominee for PM after the Kurti government failed a confidence vote, but his eligibility to be PM was questioned by Albin Kurti and his party on the grounds that one cannot form a government without first having the party that won the election enter government, and they demanded new elections. However, on 28 May 2020, the Constitution Court of Kosovo gave the right to the second party and Avdullah Hoti to form a government without elections. After the party that won the elections failed again to form a new government, the Court argued that Avdullah Hoti was eligible to proceed to be voted on by the Parliament as the new PM of the Republic of Kosovo. On 3 June 2020, Hoti was elected Prime Minister with 61 votes in favor, 24 against and one abstention.

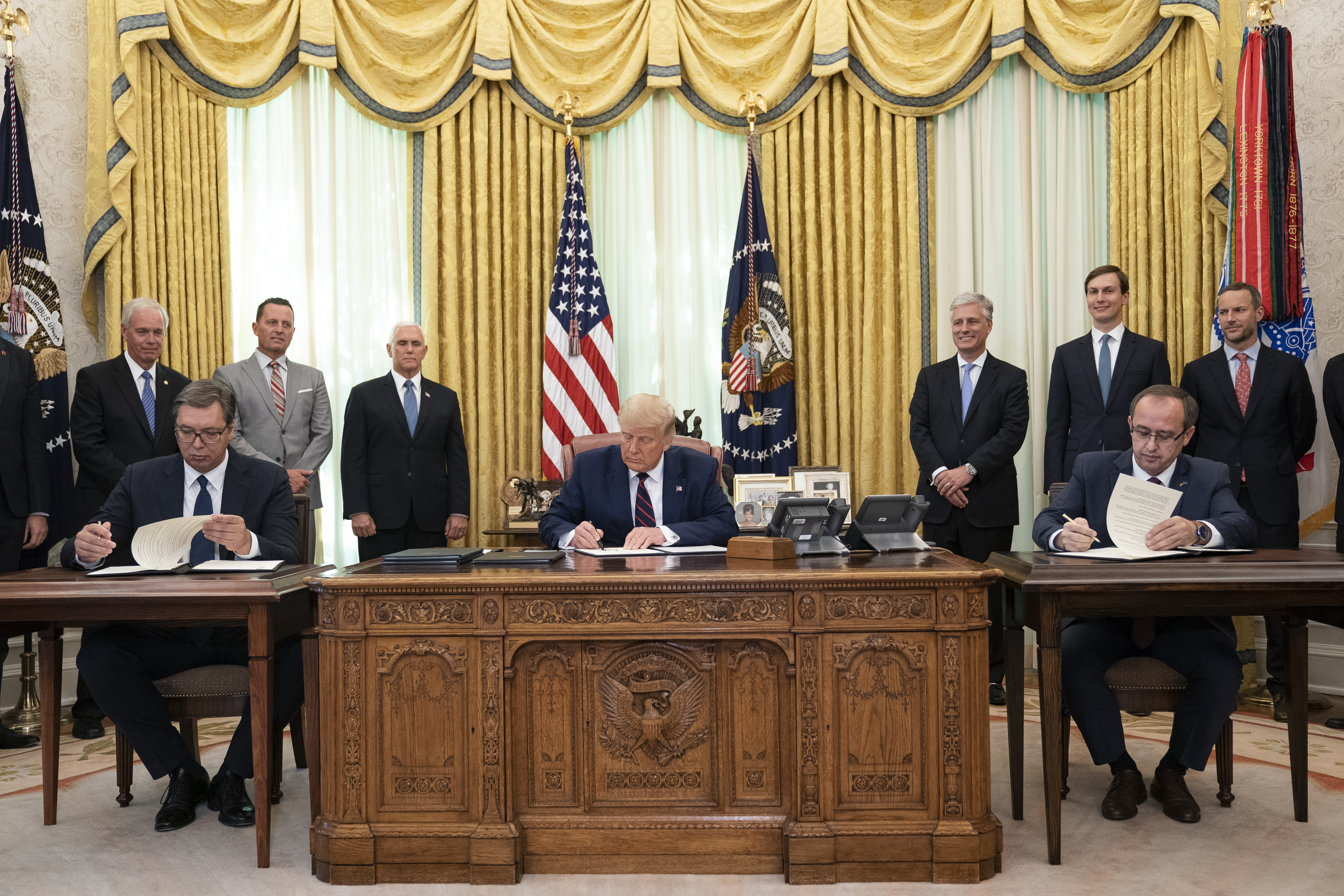
Aleksandar Vučić, President of Serbia (left), Donald Trump, President of the United States (middle), and Hoti (right), signing the 2020 Kosovo–Serbia economic agreement in the White House, 2020.

On 2 August 2020, Hoti announced on his Facebook page that he was diagnosed with COVID-19 suffering mild symptoms, and that he would work from home in the coming two weeks.

On 4 September 2020, Hoti and Aleksandar Vučić, President of Serbia, signed an agreement on the normalisation of economic relations between Serbia and Kosovo at the White House in the presence of Donald Trump, President of the United States. The deal will encompass freer transit, including by rail and road, while both parties agreed to work with the Export–Import Bank of the United States and the U.S. International Development Finance Corporation and to join the Mini Schengen Zone, but the agreement also included mutual recognition between Israel and Kosovo.

On 21 December 2020, the constitutional court of Kosovo ruled that the vote of lawmaker Etem Arifi, of the minority Ashkali Party for Integration, for the Cabinet of Prime Minister Avdullah Hoti was invalid and consequently "the Government did not have the majority of the votes of the lawmakers.” Arifi's vote gave the government 61 votes in the 120-seat chamber, and without it the vote would have failed. As a result, Kosovo went to snap elections and the Hoti government continued as a caretaker one until the elections were held.

== Countries visited ==
List of official visits abroad made by Avdullah Hoti as Prime Minister:

#	Country	Year	Cities visited	Type of visit
1	European Union	25 June 2020	Brussels	Official visit
2	Albania	3 July 2020	Tirana	Official visit
3	France	7 July 2020	Paris	Official visit
4	United States	1–5 September 2020	Washington, D.C.	2020 Kosovo–Serbia agreement
5	European Union	6–8 September 2020	Brussels	Belgrade–Pristina negotiations
6	Albania	2 October 2020	Tirana	Meeting
7	North Macedonia	23 October 2020	Skopje	Official visit
8	Italy	3 November 2020	Rome	Official visit
9	Vatican City	5 November 2020	Vatican City	Official visit

Political offices
Preceded by Albin Kurti	Prime Minister of Kosovo; 2020–2021	Succeeded by Albin Kurti
Preceded by Behgjet Pacolli	First Deputy Prime Minister; 2020	Succeeded by Besnik Tahiri
Preceded by Bedri Hamza	Minister of Finance of Kosovo; 2014–2017	Succeeded by Agim Krasniqi
