= Mercedes-Benz G-Class =

Series of Sport Utility Vehicles (SUVs)

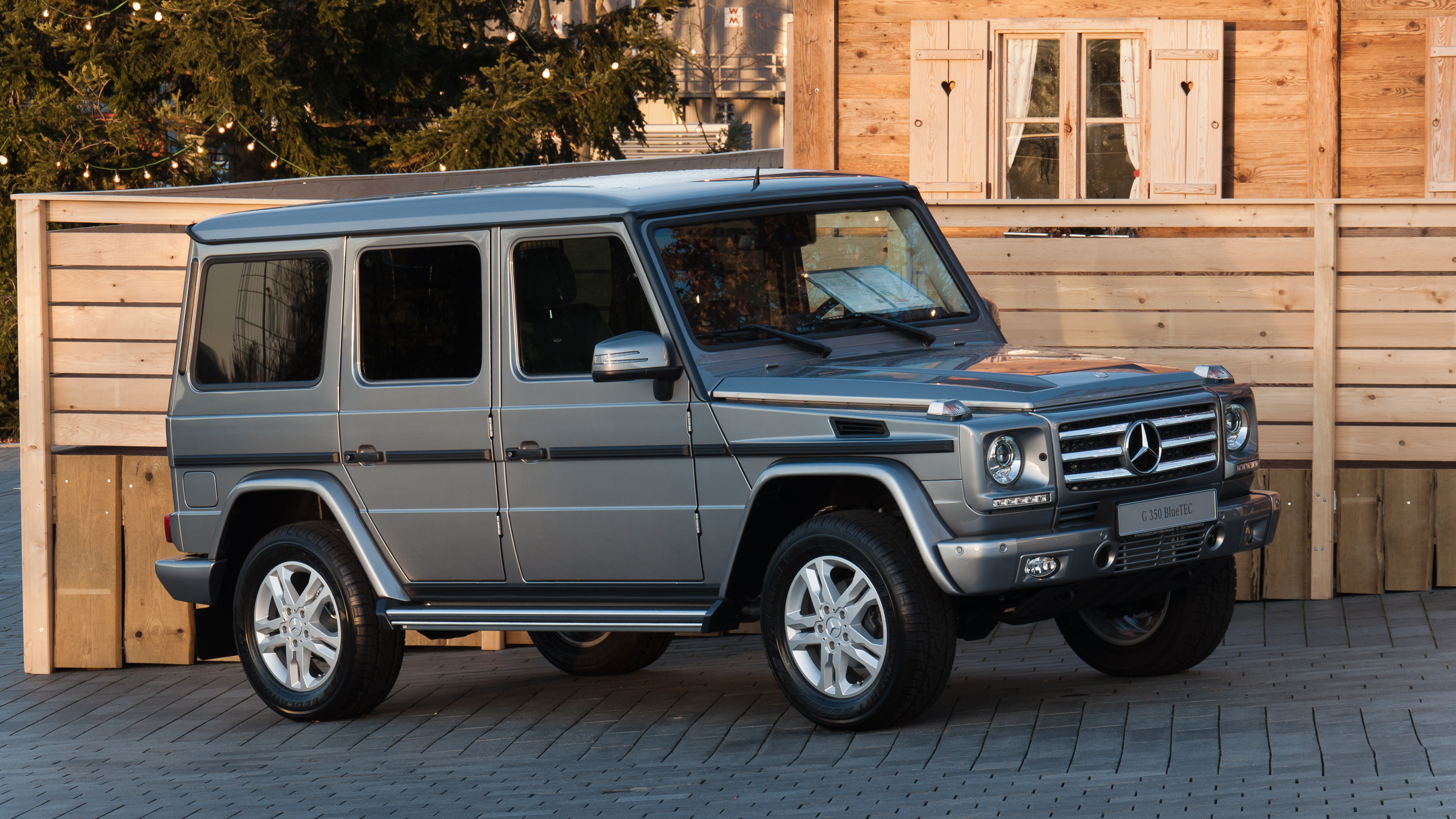
- Mercedes-Benz G 350 (W463)

Overview
- Manufacturer: Daimler-Benz (1979–1998); DaimlerChrysler (1998–2007); Daimler AG (2007–2022); Mercedes-Benz Group (2022–present)
- Also called: Mercedes-Benz G-Wagen (1979–present); Mercedes-Benz G-Wagon; Puch G (1979–2000)
- Production: 1979–present
- Assembly: Austria: Graz (Magna Steyr); Algeria: Tiaret (BA6, BA9 G Class); Greece: Thessaloniki (Hellenic Vehicle Industry)

Body and chassis
- Class: Military off-roader Off-road vehicle Luxury SUV; Pickup truck
- Chassis: Body-on-frame

The Mercedes-Benz G-Class, colloquially known as the G-Wagon or G-Wagen (as an abbreviation of Geländewagen), is a four-wheel drive luxury SUV sold by Mercedes-Benz. Originally developed as a military off-roader, later more luxurious models were added to the line. In certain markets, it was sold under the Puch name as Puch G until 2000.

The G-Class is characterised by its boxy styling and body-on-frame construction. It uses three fully locking differentials, making it one of the few passenger vehicles to have such a feature. Despite the introduction of an intended replacement, the unibody SUV Mercedes-Benz GL-Class in 2006, the G-Class is still in production and is one of the longest-produced vehicles in Daimler's history, with a span of 47 years; only the Unimog surpasses it. In 2018, Mercedes-Benz introduced the second-generation W463 with heavily revised chassis, powertrain, body, and interior. In 2023, Mercedes-Benz announced plans to launch a smaller version of the G-Class, named "little G"—though no definitive date was given for the launch.

The 400,000th unit was built on 4 December 2020. The success of the second-generation W463 led to the 500,000th unit milestone three years later in April 2023. The 500,000th model was a special one-off model with agave green paintwork, black front end, and amber turn signal indicators in tribute to the iconic 1979 press release photo of a jumping W460 240 GD.

== History ==
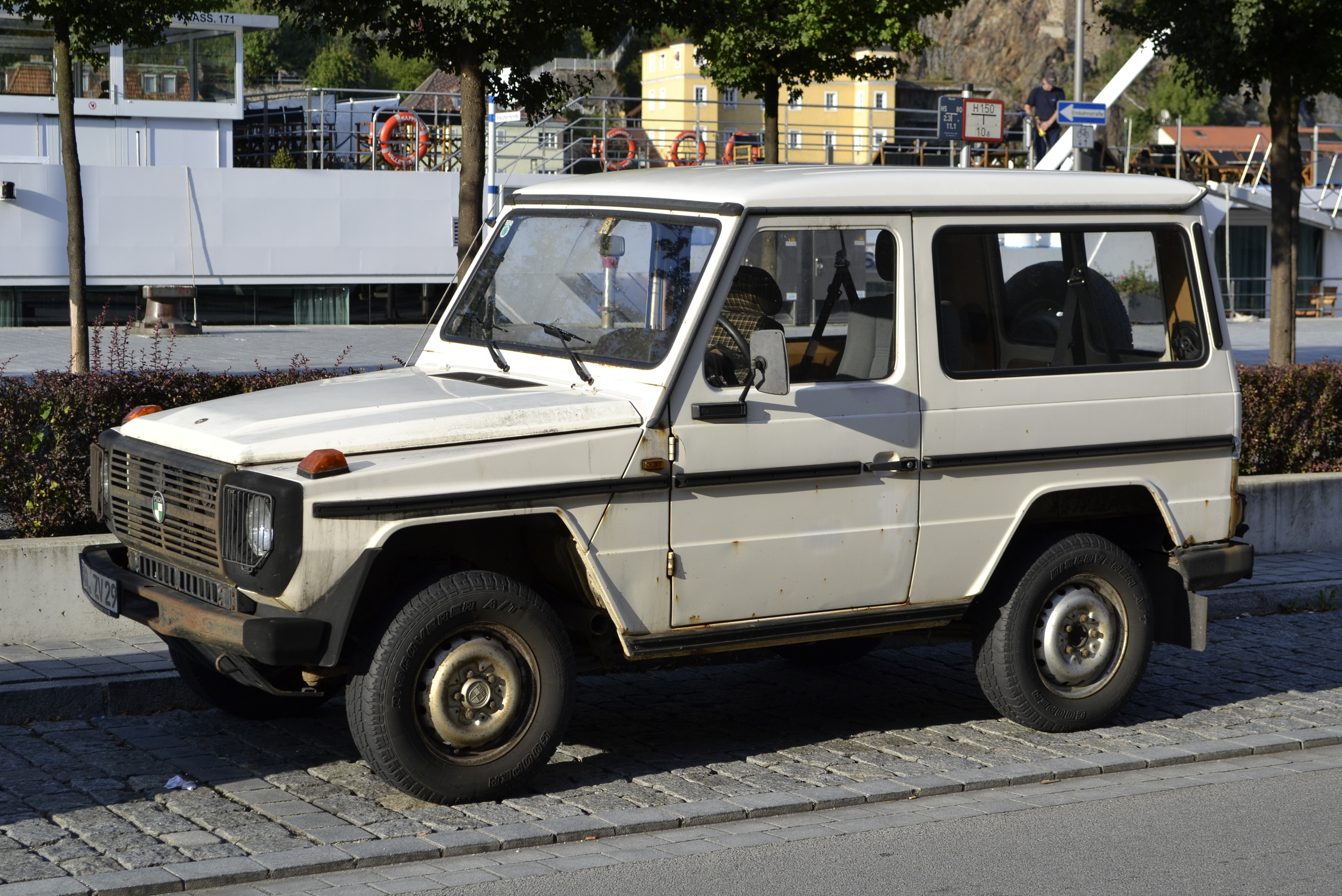
Puch G

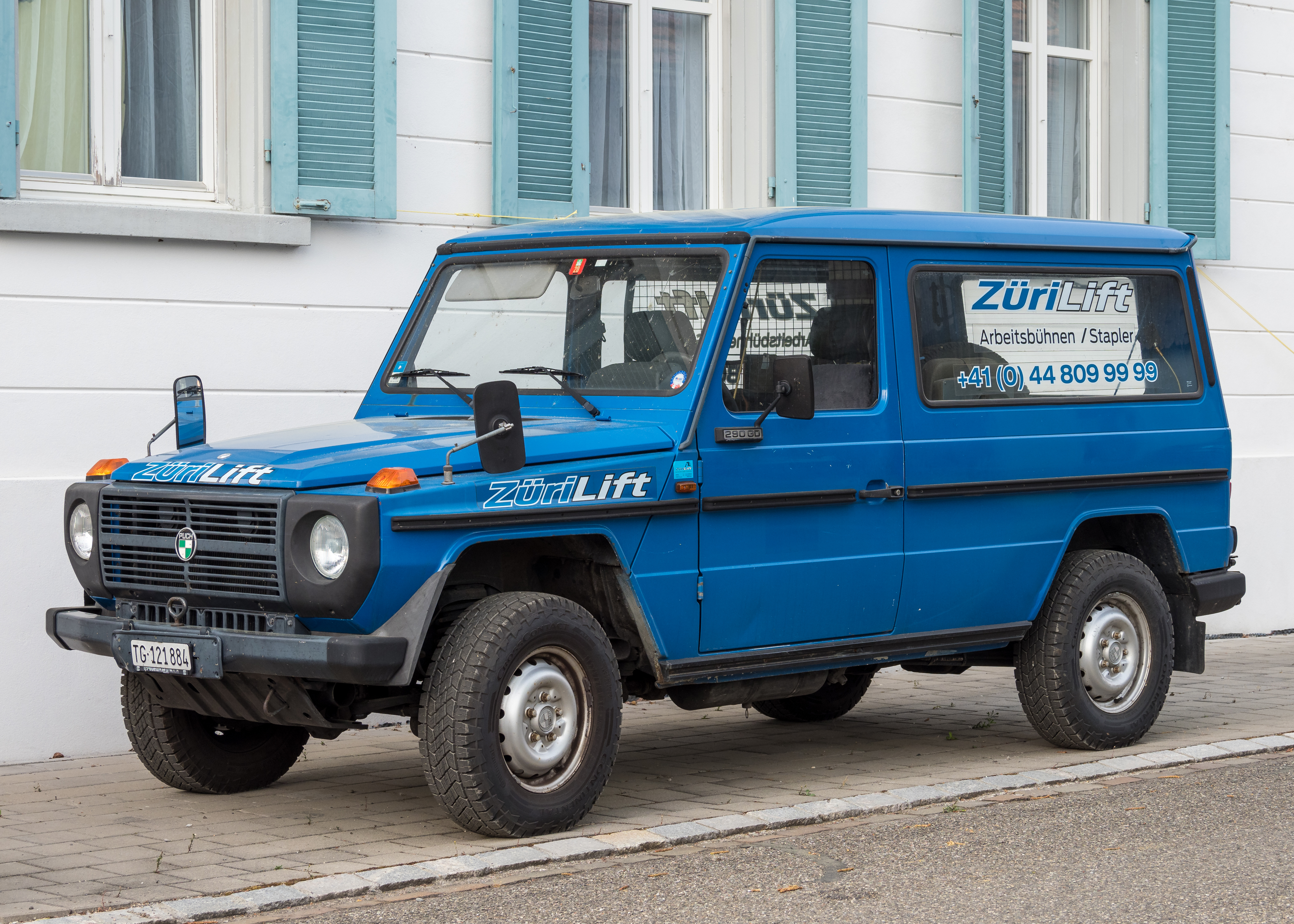
Steyr Daimler Puch 290GD

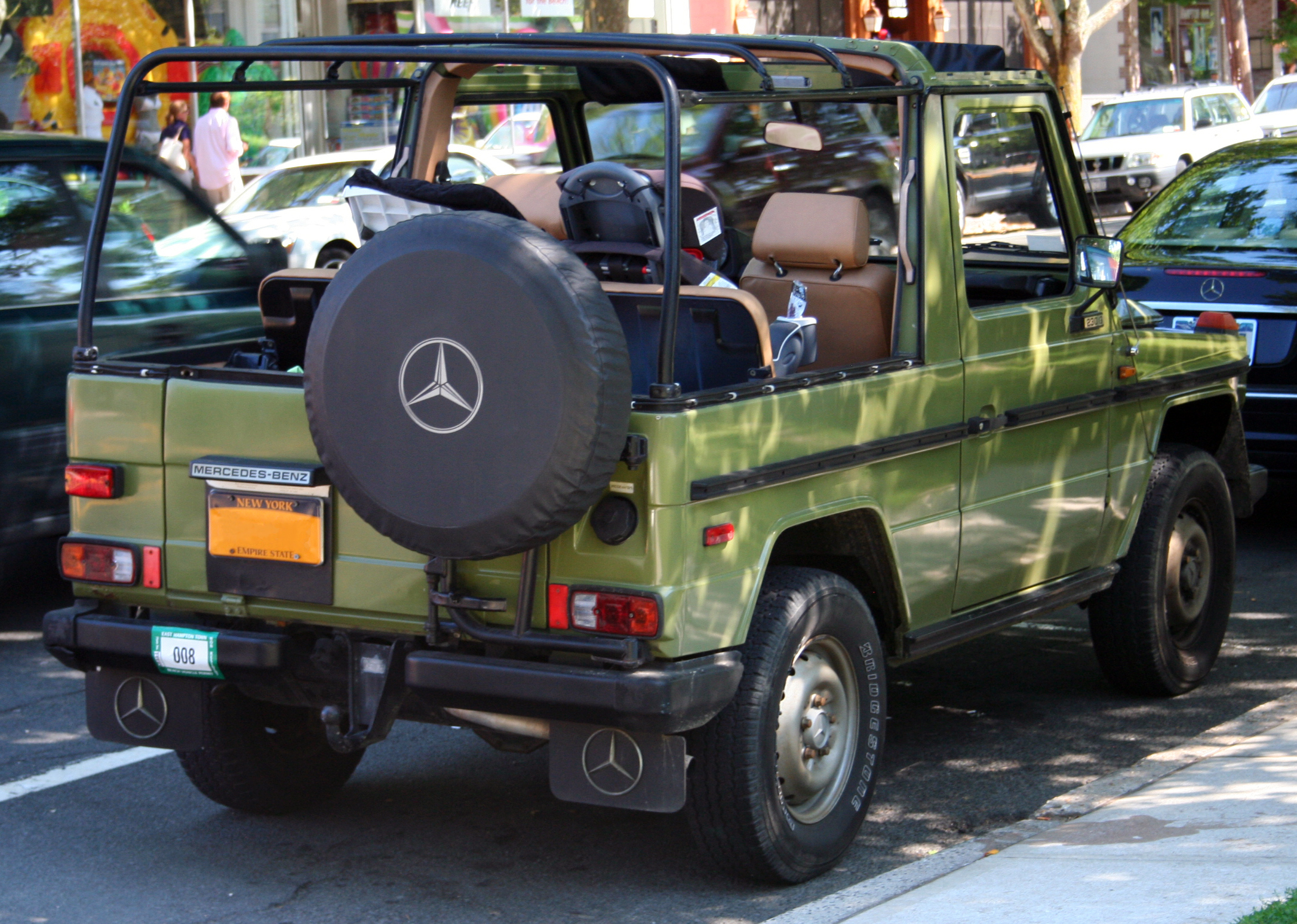
Very early, carburetted grey market Mercedes-Benz 230 G Cabriolet

The G-class was developed as a military vehicle from a suggestion by the Shah of Iran Mohammad Reza Pahlavi to Mercedes and was later offered as a civilian vehicle in 1979. In this military role the vehicle was sometimes referred to as the "Wolf". The Peugeot P4 was a variant made under licence in France with a Peugeot engine. The first military in the world to use it was the Argentine Army (Ejército Argentino) beginning in 1981 with the military model 461, at least one of these was captured in the Falklands and subsequently served with the Royal Air Force.

The development of the G-Class started in 1972 with a cooperative agreement between Daimler-Benz and Steyr-Daimler-Puch in Graz, Austria. Mercedes-Benz engineers in Stuttgart were in charge of design and testing, while the team in Graz developed the production plans. The first wooden model was presented to Daimler-Benz management in 1973, with the first drivable prototype beginning various testing including German coalfields, the Sahara Desert, and the Arctic Circle in 1974. Construction commenced on a new production facility in Graz, where the new cross-country vehicle would be assembled nearly entirely by hand in 1975, with production of the "G Model" beginning in Graz in 1979. In 1980, the Vatican took delivery of a specially made G-Wagen outfitted with a clear thermoplastic top which served as the Popemobile. The "Papa G" later took up permanent residence at the Mercedes-Benz Museum in Stuttgart, Germany.

The first major refinements were introduced in 1981, including an automatic transmission, air conditioning, an auxiliary fuel tank, protective headlamp grilles, and a cable winch. Fuel injection became available in 1982, when the 230 GE was introduced in Turin, along with more comfortable and supportive front seats, auxiliary heating, wider tires and fender flares. For 1985, differential locks, central door locking and a tachometer became standard. By 1986, over 50,000 G Models had been produced.

The G-Wagen was facelifted in 1990. In 1989, for the 10th anniversary of the G Model, a new model variant with permanent 4-wheel drive, a wood-trimmed interior and optional Anti-lock Braking System (ABS) debuted at the Frankfurt International Motor Show. Production began the following April. For 1992, production began on a new sub-series for professional users. The civilian model began to offer cruise control, a stainless-steel spare-tire cover, running boards and Burl Walnut wood interior trim. In the same year, the 100,000th G Model was built in Graz and in 1994, the model line was officially renamed the G-Class. Ventilated front disc brakes and a driver's air bag became standard. In 1996 the automatic transmission became an electronically controlled 5-speed unit and headlamp washers, cruise control, and a front passenger's air bag were added. In 1998, the range-topping G 500 with a 300 PS (221 kW; 296 hp) V8 was introduced for series production.

For 1999 a limited run of V8 powered "G 500 Classic" special editions marked the model's 20th anniversary. A multifunction steering wheel was added to all models. Later in the year, the new G 55 AMG debuted as the most powerful G-Class yet, with 354 hp. The U.S. market launch of the G-Class took place in 2001. New alloy wheels, a chrome grille and body-colour bumpers plus a more luxurious cabin were introduced. New dynamic control systems included the Electronic Stability Program (ESP), Brake Assist, and the four-wheel Electronic Traction System (4 ETS). The G 55 AMG was upgraded in 2004 with a supercharged V8 engine developing 480 PS (353 kW; 473 hp).

In 2006, a documentary filmmaker was the first foreigner to reach Siberia, the world's coldest region, with a passenger vehicle in winter, driving a stock G 500 nearly 19,000 km without a single breakdown, in temperatures as frigid as −63˚F/-53 °C.

== W460, first generation (1979–1991) ==
W460
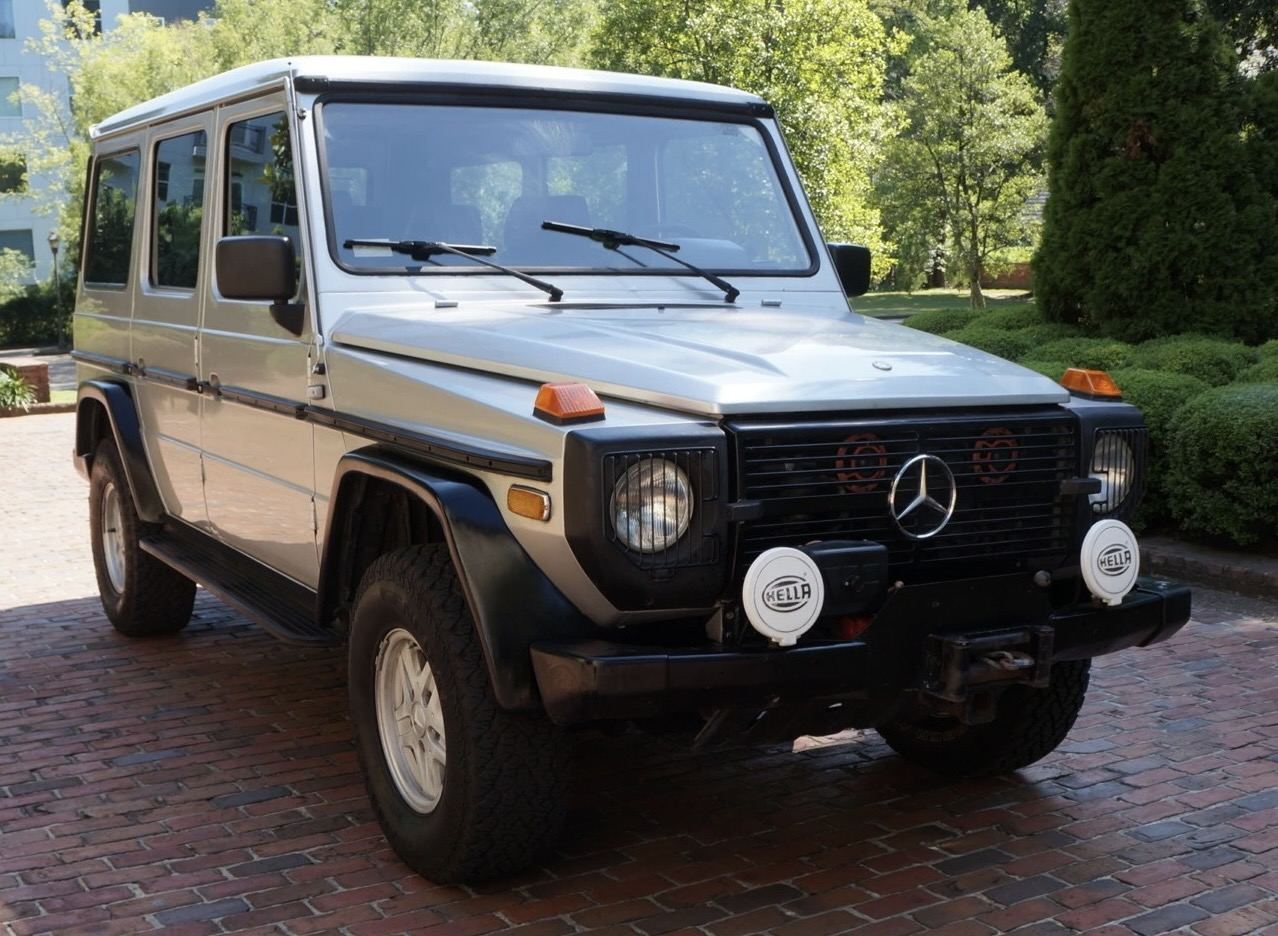

Overview
- Also called: Puch G
- Production: 1979–1991
- Designer: Erich Ledwinka

Body and chassis
- Body style: 2-door SWB convertible 2-door cab chassis (pickup truck); 3-door SWB station wagon 3-door SWB panel van 3-door LWB station wagon 3-door LWB panel van 5-door LWB station wagon
- Layout: Front engine, four-wheel drive

Powertrain
- Engine: 2.0L M 102.964 E20 I4; 2.3L M 115.973 I4; 2.6L M 115 2.6 Brabus I4; 2.8L M 110.994 I6; 2.4L OM 616 I4 diesel 2.5L OM 602 I5 diesel 3.0L OM 617 I5 diesel
- Transmission: 4-speed manual 5-speed manual 4-speed 720.1 (W4A 018) automatic

Dimensions
- Wheelbase: 2,400 mm (94.5 in) (2-door); 2,850 mm (112.2 in) (4-door)
- Curb weight: 3,913.21 lb (1,775 kg)

The W460 was introduced at a press event held at the off-road proving ground in Toulon, France, and went on sale in September 1979 with three engine choices and five body variants. Over the next decade, the engine and transmission choices were expanded or updated along with more and more optional extra cost creature comforts (air conditioning, automatic transmission, power windows, etc.).

The G-Wagen gained its global fame in 1980 when Mercedes-Benz built a Popemobile based on 230 G cabriolet during the first visit of Pope John Paul II in Germany.

Mercedes-Benz never officially exported the G-Wagen to the United States because it was considered more of a utilitarian vehicle and didn't fit the American perception of what Mercedes-Benz was. During the 1980s, the grey import specialists brought the W460 to the United States and modified them to meet the US regulations. In 1988, the new federal law, Motor Vehicle Safety Compliance Act, closed the loopholes and tightened up the regulations for grey imports, making it more difficult and more expensive for the registered importers to federalise the W460 in a very small number. The other issue was severely underpowered engines in the 230 GE, 280 GE, and 300 GD models might not have appealed to the American market as was the case with the Mercedes-Benz 380 SEL in the early 1980s.

The 200 GE was built specifically for Italian markets and other markets where a heavy tax penalty was incurred for engines larger than 2 litres. The 300 GD was the most popular model while the 280 GE was the most powerful. Despite the availability of turbocharged diesel engines in other Mercedes-Benz vehicles, one was never fitted to the W460.

The rarest W460 variants were the Italian market 200 GE Cabriolet with 64 total units produced, 230 GE 2.6 Brabus (1989–?), the 280 GE AMG, and the 560 GE (1993). Brabus increased the engine displacement of the 2.3-litre four-cylinder inline engine to 2.6 litres, increasing the power to 114 kW (155 PS; 153 bhp). AMG modified the 2.8-litre six-cylinder inline petrol engine for more power, 134 kW (182 PS; 180 bhp). Only two units of the 560 GE were built in 1993 as part of a feasibility study that resulted in a limited series of the W463 500 GE for 1993–1994 and the W463 G 500 from 1998 on.

=== Derivations ===
==== G-Wagen W462 ELBO (1988–2005) ====
This version was assembled from Complete Knock Down (CKD) by ELBO, formerly a Steyr-Daimler-Puch branch division, in Thessaloniki, Greece for the Greek Army. Additionally, the CKD was also assembled at Mercedes-Benz's Aksaray plant in Turkey. The engine options were a 2.3-litre four-cylinder inline petrol and later a 2.9-litre five-cylinder inline diesel, with the available models being the 240 GD and the 290 GDT.

==== Peugeot P4 VLTT (1981–1988) ====
The W460 was assembled in France under licence by Peugeot for the French Army with Peugeot engine and transmission from the 504 and 604 respectively as well as its own seats and wiring system. The front differential gear lock was omitted because Peugeot used its own axles. They are easily identified by rectangular headlamps.

==== Puch G (1979–2000) ====
An agreement between Daimler-Benz AG and Steyr-Daimler-Puch stipulated that G-Wagens sold in Austria, Switzerland, Yugoslavia (and its successor states: Bosnia-Herzegovina, Croatia, Macedonia, Serbia, and Slovenia), Mongolia, and Eastern European COMECON countries were called Puch G and elsewhere as Mercedes-Benz G-Wagen/G-Class. The reason for the different branding was due to Puch's reputation for its all-terrain vehicles, the Haflinger and Pinzgauer. Since the agreement expired in 2000, consumers could order a retrofit kit from Magna's Puch Competence Centre to replace the Mercedes-Benz brands with Puch emblems.

For Pope John Paul II's visit to Austria in 1983, Puch emblems was used on the Popemobile instead.

=== Engines ===
Model	Years	Configuration	Displacement	Power	Torque	0–100 km/h (0–62 mph)	Top speed	Fuel consumption/efficiency (EU-norm-urban, 90 km/h, 120 km/h)
Petrol engines
200 GE (Italy only)	1986–1991	I4 (M 102.964)	1,997 cc (121.9 cu in)	87 kW (118 PS; 117 bhp) at 5,200 rpm	178 N⋅m (131 lb⋅ft) at 3,500 rpm	18 seconds	140 km/h (87 mph)	16.0 L/100 km (14.7 mpg_{‑US}) — —
230 G	1979–1982	I4 (M 115.973)	2,307 cc (140.8 cu in)	66 kW (90 PS; 89 bhp) at 5,000 rpm 75 kW (102 PS; 101 bhp) at 5,000 rpm	167 N⋅m (123 lb⋅ft) at 3,500 rpm	26 seconds	128 km/h (80 mph)	19.8 L/100 km (11.9 mpg_{‑US}); 13.5 L/100 km (17.4 mpg_{‑US}); 19.8 L/100 km (11.9 mpg_{‑US})
230 GE	1982–1992	I4 (M 102.981)	2,299 cc (140.3 cu in)	92 kW (125 PS; 123 bhp) at 5,100 rpm Catalyzed: 90 kW (122 PS; 121 bhp)	192 N⋅m (142 lb⋅ft) at 4,000 rpm	17 seconds	152 km/h (94 mph)	17.2 L/100 km (13.7 mpg_{‑US}); 12.2 L/100 km (19.3 mpg_{‑US}); 16.2 L/100 km (14.5 mpg_{‑US})
280 GE	1979–1990	I6 (M 110.994)	2,746 cc (167.6 cu in)	115 kW (156 PS; 154 bhp) at 5,250 rpm Catalyzed: 110 kW (150 PS; 148 bhp)	226 N⋅m (167 lb⋅ft) at 4,250 rpm	14 seconds	165 km/h (103 mph)	22.4 L/100 km (10.5 mpg_{‑US}); 14.0 L/100 km (16.8 mpg_{‑US}); 18.8 L/100 km (12.5 mpg_{‑US})
Special variants
230 GE 2.6 Brabus	1989–1990	I4 (M 102.981 2.6 Brabus)	2,587 cc (157.9 cu in)	114 kW (155 PS; 153 bhp) at 5,500 rpm	260 N⋅m (192 lb⋅ft) at 3,300 rpm	14.7 seconds	158 km/h (98 mph)	17.2 L/100 km (13.7 mpg_{‑US}); 12.2 L/100 km (19.3 mpg_{‑US}); 16.2 L/100 km (14.5 mpg_{‑US})
280 GE AMG	1979–1990	I6 (M 110.994)	2,746 cc (167.6 cu in)	134 kW (182 PS; 180 bhp) at 5,250 rpm	226 N⋅m (167 lb⋅ft) at 4,250 rpm	14 seconds	165 km/h (103 mph)	22.4 L/100 km (10.5 mpg_{‑US}); 14.0 L/100 km (16.8 mpg_{‑US}); 18.8 L/100 km (12.5 mpg_{‑US})
Diesel engines
240 GD	1979–1987	I4 (OM 616.936, .938, .941)	2,399 cc (146.4 cu in)	53 kW (72 PS; 71 bhp) at 4,400 rpm	137 N⋅m (101 lb⋅ft) at 2,400 rpm	32 seconds	115 km/h (71 mph)	14.4 L/100 km (16.3 mpg_{‑US}); 12.0 L/100 km (19.6 mpg_{‑US}) —
250 GD	1987–1992	I5 (OM 602.938, .939)	2,497 cc (152.4 cu in)	84 PS (83 hp)	154 N⋅m (114 lb⋅ft) at 2,200–2,800 rpm	27 seconds	127 km/h (79 mph)	12.8 L/100 km (18.4 mpg_{‑US}); 10.0 L/100 km (24 mpg_{‑US}) —
300 GD	1979–1990	I5 (OM 617.931, .932)	2,998 cc (182.9 cu in)	65 kW (88 PS; 87 bhp) at 4,400 rpm	172 N⋅m (127 lb⋅ft) at 2,400 rpm	27 seconds	127 km/h (79 mph)	14.6 L/100 km (16.1 mpg_{‑US}); 11.7 L/100 km (20.1 mpg_{‑US}); 18.8 L/100 km (12.5 mpg_{‑US})

== W461 (1985–2022) ==
W461
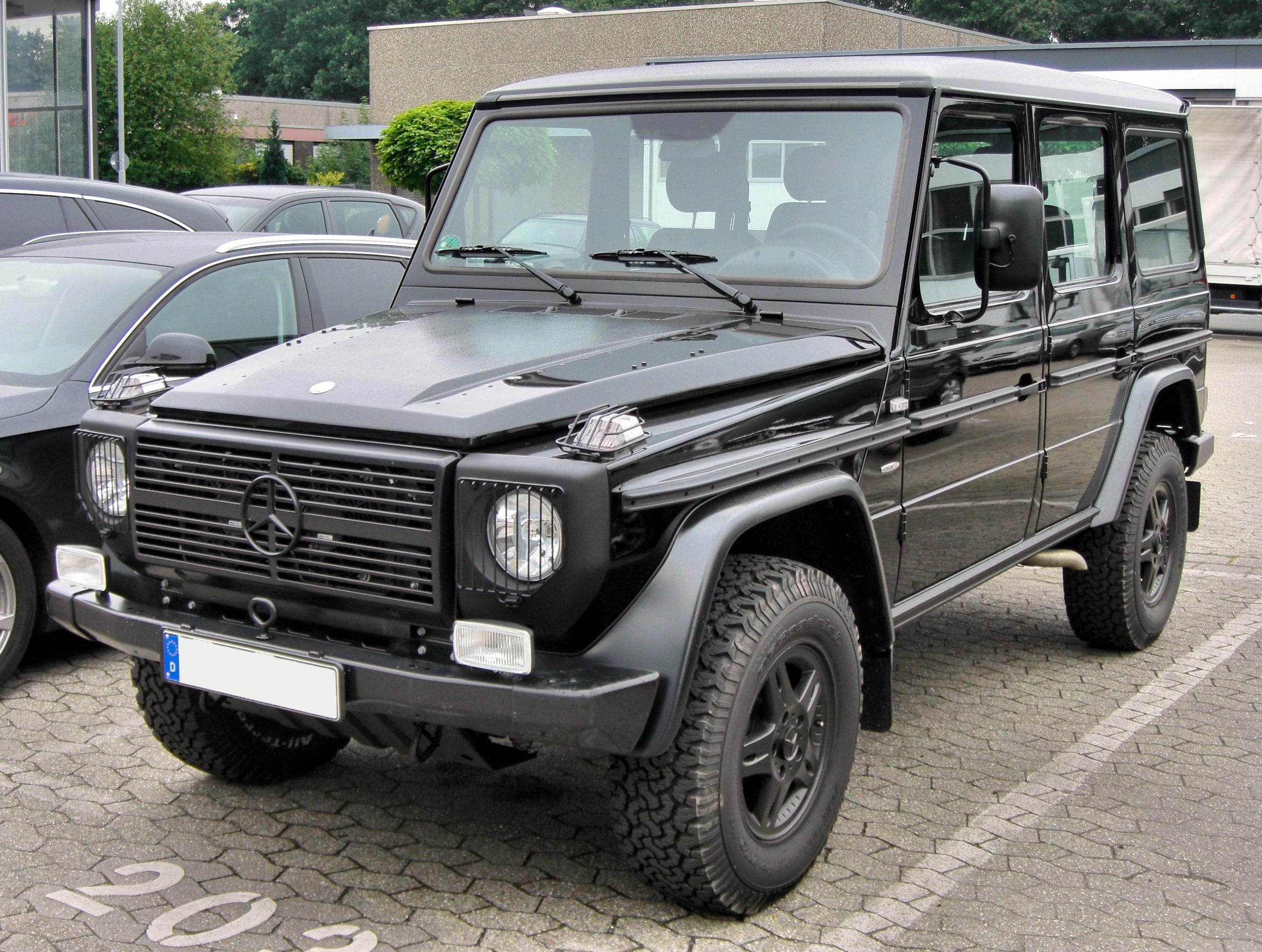
- Mercedes G-Class G 280 CDI EDITION.30 PUR

Overview
- Also called: Puch G
- Production: 1985–2022 (military variant); Civilian variant produced through 2019
- Designer: Bruno Sacco

Body and chassis
- Body style: 2-door SWB convertible 2-door cab chassis (pickup truck); 3-door SWB panel van 3-door LWB panel van 5-door LWB station wagon
- Layout: Front engine, four-wheel drive

Powertrain
- Engine: 2.3L M 102 E 23 I4; 2.5L OM 602.930 I5 diesel 2.7L OM 612 DE 27 LA I5 turbodiesel 2.9L OM 602 D 29 I5 diesel 2.9L OM 602 DE 29 LA I5 turbodiesel 3.0L OM 642 DE 30 LA red. V6 turbodiesel
- Transmission: 4-speed 720.1 (W4A 018) automatic 5-speed manual 4-speed manual

Dimensions
- Wheelbase: 2,400 mm (94.5 in) (2-door); 2,850 mm (112.2 in) (4-door)
- Curb weight: 4,728.92 lb (2,145 kg)

After the new W463 was introduced in 1989 with an extensively updated chassis and a revised front end, the production of the W460 ended in 1991 and was replaced by the W461. The W461 has essentially the same chassis as the W460 but with the powertrain of the W463 and the body of the W460. While the W463 is aimed at consumers who seek more creature comforts and better driving dynamics, the W461 is built specifically for military, public authorities, and non-governmental organisations. That included the 24-Volt electrical system for the W461.

During the 1990s, the W461 was offered with a 2.3-litre four inline petrol engine and a 2.9-litre five inline diesel engine from 1992 to 2001. From 2001 to 2014, the W461 model for military and public authorities was offered with a 2.7-litre inline five turbodiesel engine and later with a 3.0-litre V6 turbodiesel engine. They were called G 270 CDI Worker (2001–2006) and G 280 CDI Worker (2007–2009) respectively.

On 1 October 2021, Mercedes-Benz announced a new variation of W461 called W464.

=== Civilian editions ===
Over the years, Mercedes-Benz had introduced the civilian version of the W461, built in limited numbers and for a limited period of time. They targeted primarily the consumers who wanted the "stripped down" version and did not need the creature comforts. The engine choice was often limited to one type, namely a diesel engine, per series. Those editions were named PUR or Professional.

==== EDITION.30 PUR ====
In 2009, Mercedes-Benz, celebrating the 30-year anniversary of the G-Class, introduced the G 280 CDI EDITION.30 PUR as a five-door long wheelbase station wagon. The consumers could order theirs with "Off-Road Package 1" or "Off-Road Package 2". The passenger compartment had four seats upholstered in hard-wearing fabric or vinyl, rubber floor coverings, spray-protected/water-resistant controls, drainage apertures in the footwells, and a wood floor in the load compartment with load lashing lugs and rails. The dashboard received a new instrument cluster from the W463 and dual air bags and the climate control remained manually operated as did the window winders and locks. The exterior received flexible wheel arch flaring, protective grilles for headlamps, taillamps, front turn signal indicators, a walk-on hood/bonnet for easy access to the optional roof rack, a towing lug attached to the front bumper and two-section barn doors at the rear.

==== Professional ====
The success of the limited series "EDITION.30 PUR" led to the G 280 CDI Professional in 2009 and its successor, the G 300 CDI Professional, in 2010. Initially the 280 CDI Professional was limited to a five-door long wheelbase station wagon design before the body variants were expanded to five different body variations: a three-door long wheelbase panel van (Kastenwagen in German), a five-door long wheelbase station wagon, a two-door cabriolet and a two or four-door cab chassis truck (Pritschenwagen in German) for the G 300 CDI Professional. The production of the civilian variant continued through 2019. However, the military variant continued through 2022 when it was replaced by the new W464 model.

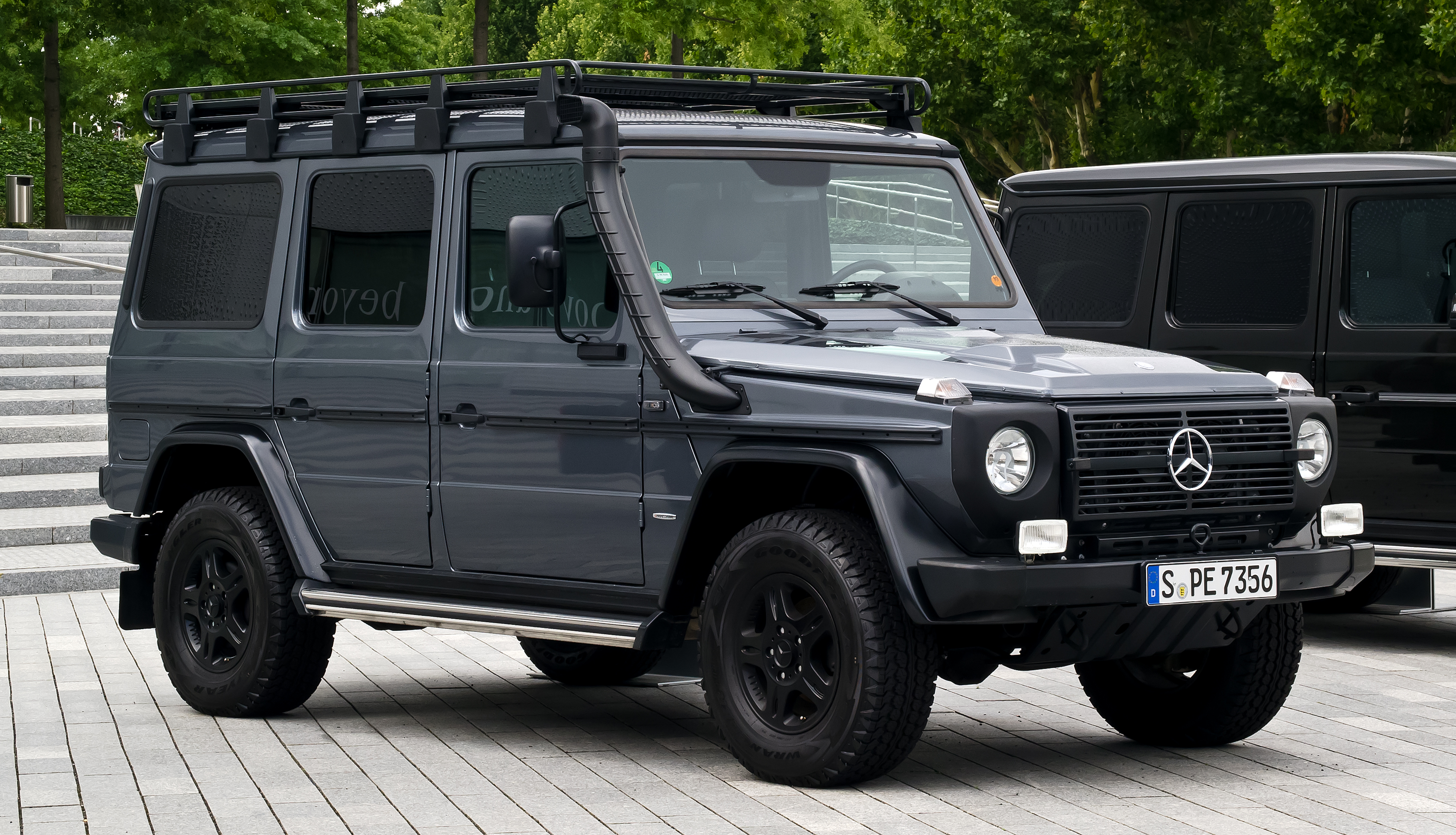
G 300 CDI Professional (W461), Front View

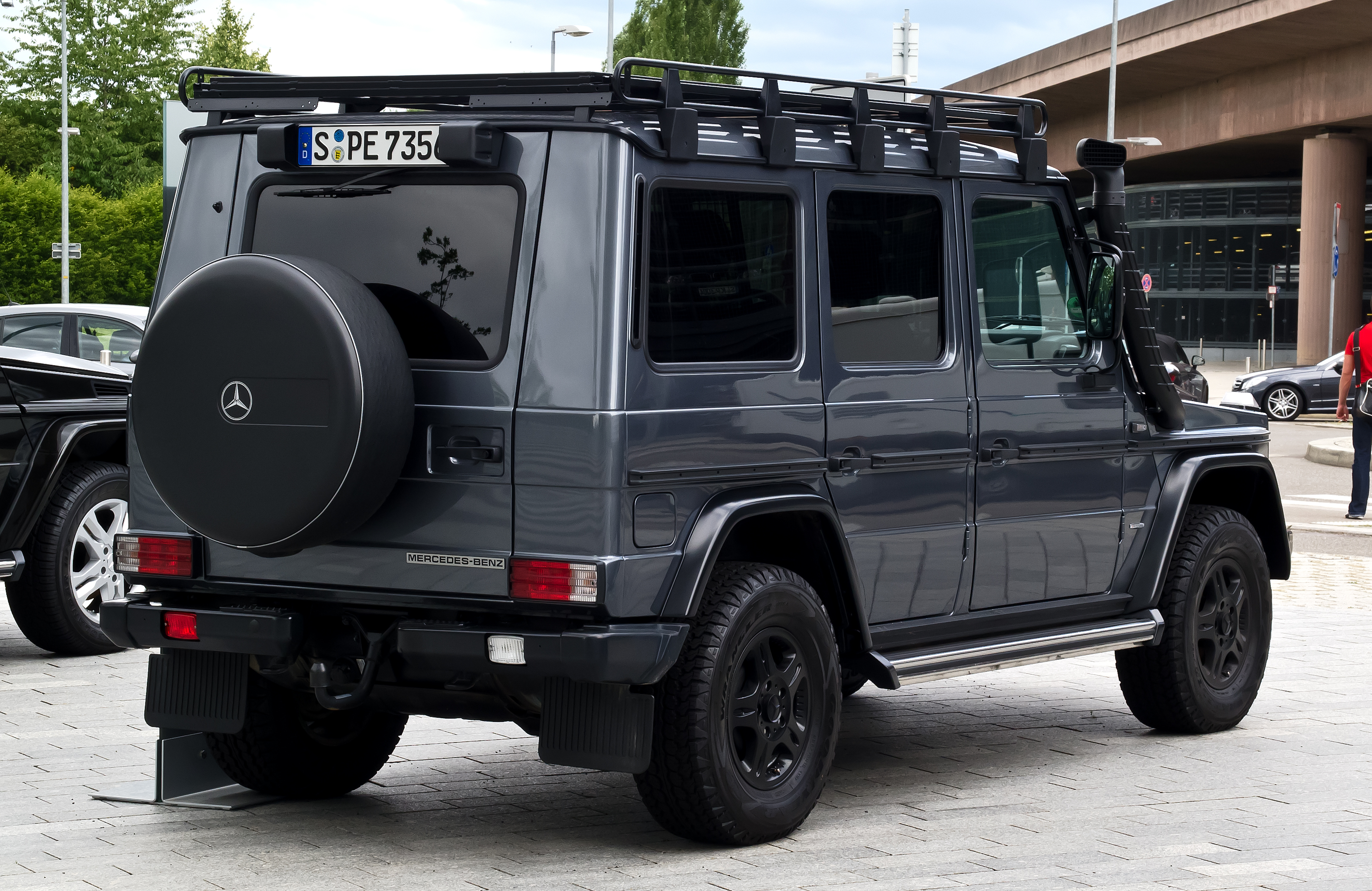
G 300 CDI Professional (W461), Rear View

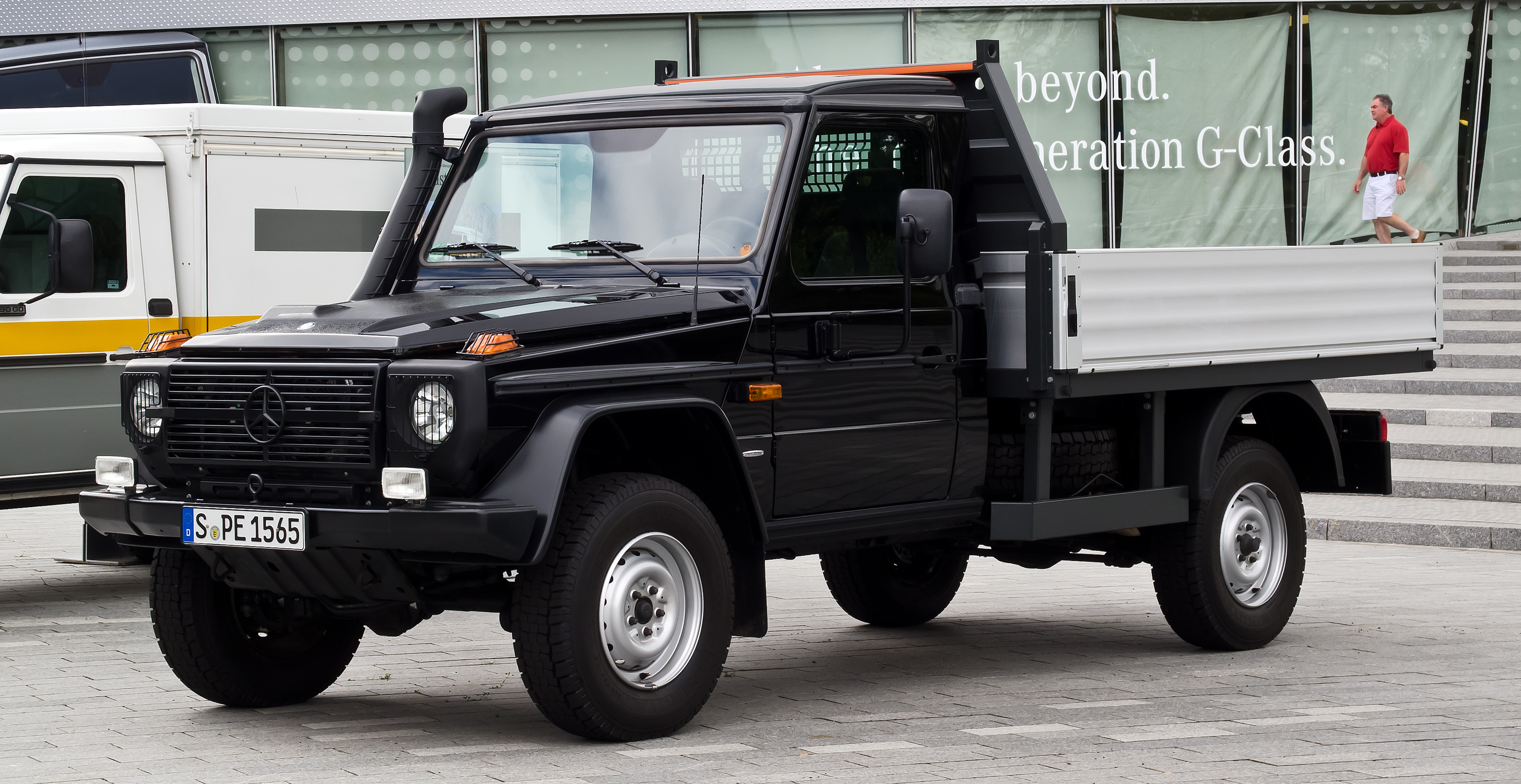
G 300 CDI Professional Pritschenwagen (W461), Front View

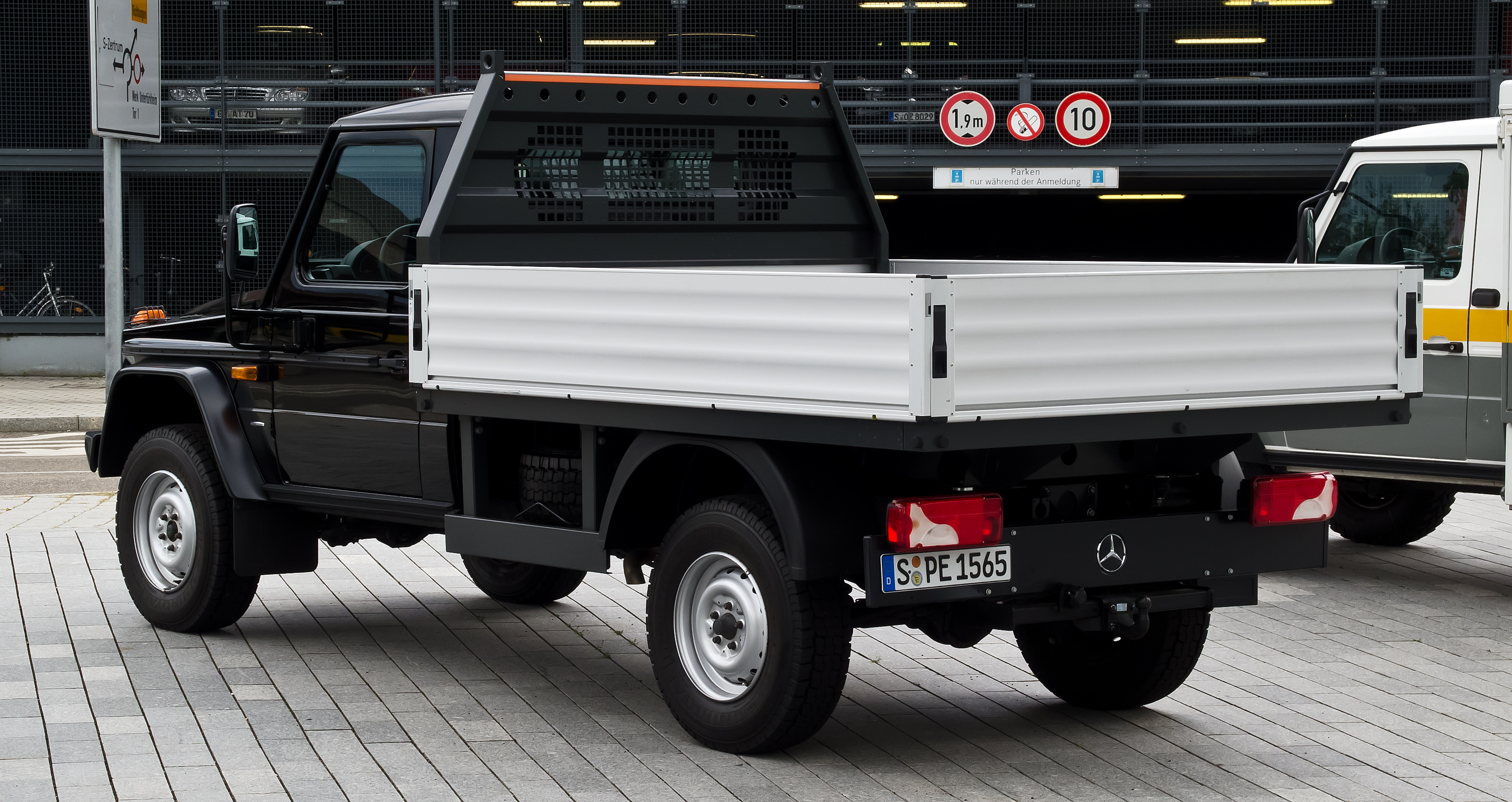
G 300 CDI Professional Pritschenwagen (W461), Rear View

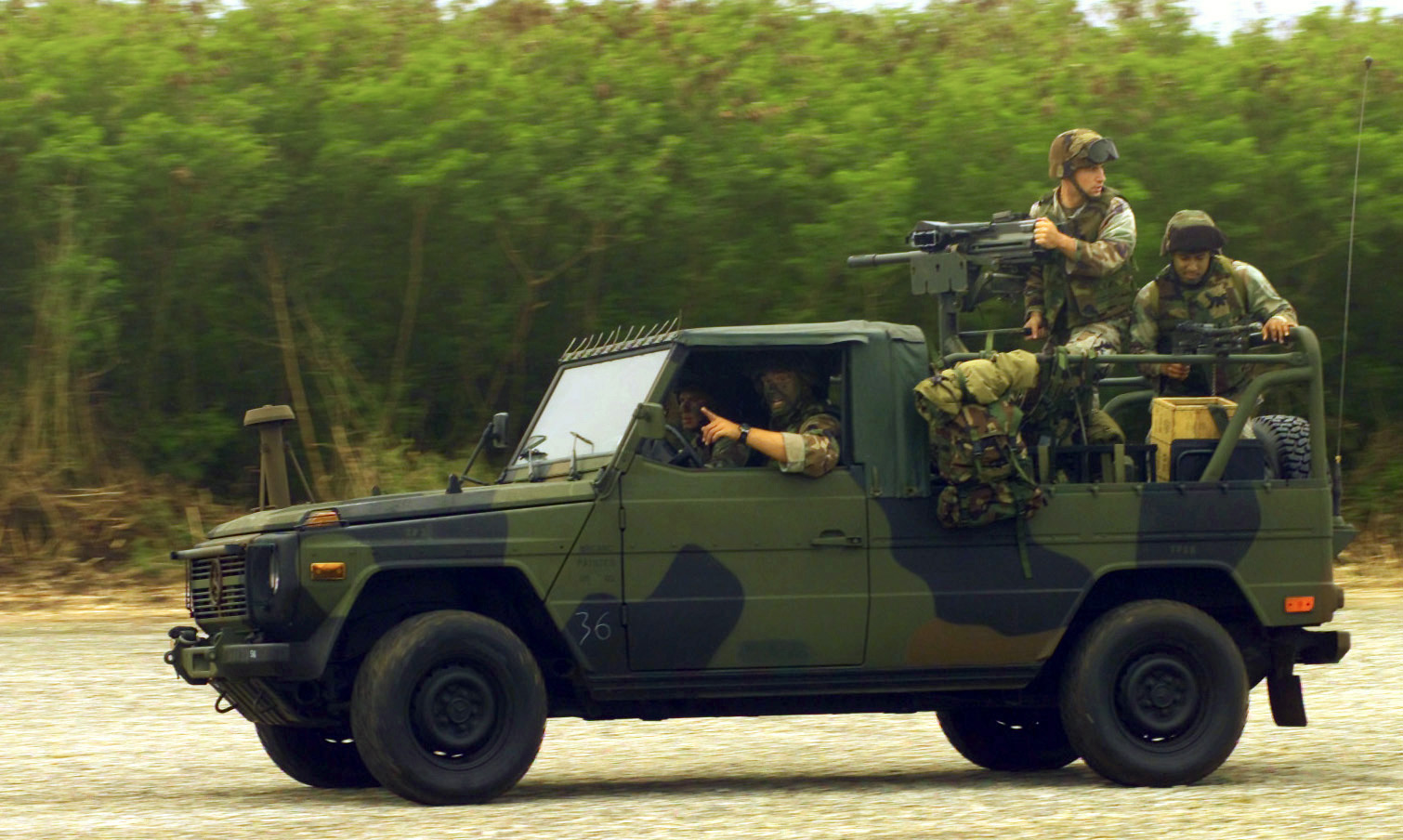
USMC Interim Fast Attack Vehicle (IFAV)

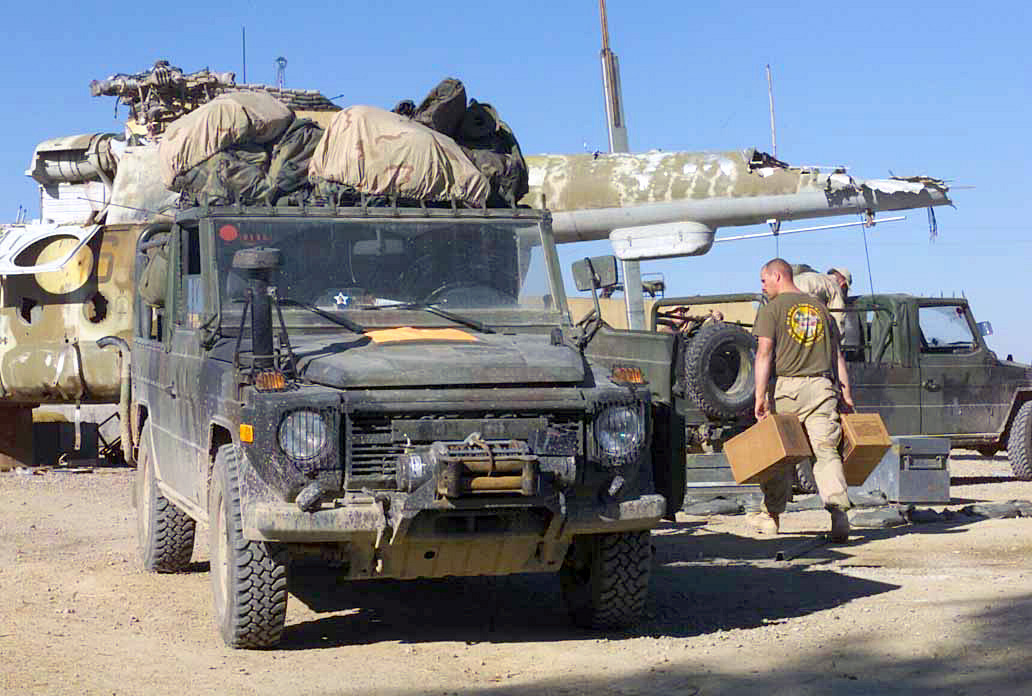
USMC Interim Fast Attack Vehicle (IFAV)

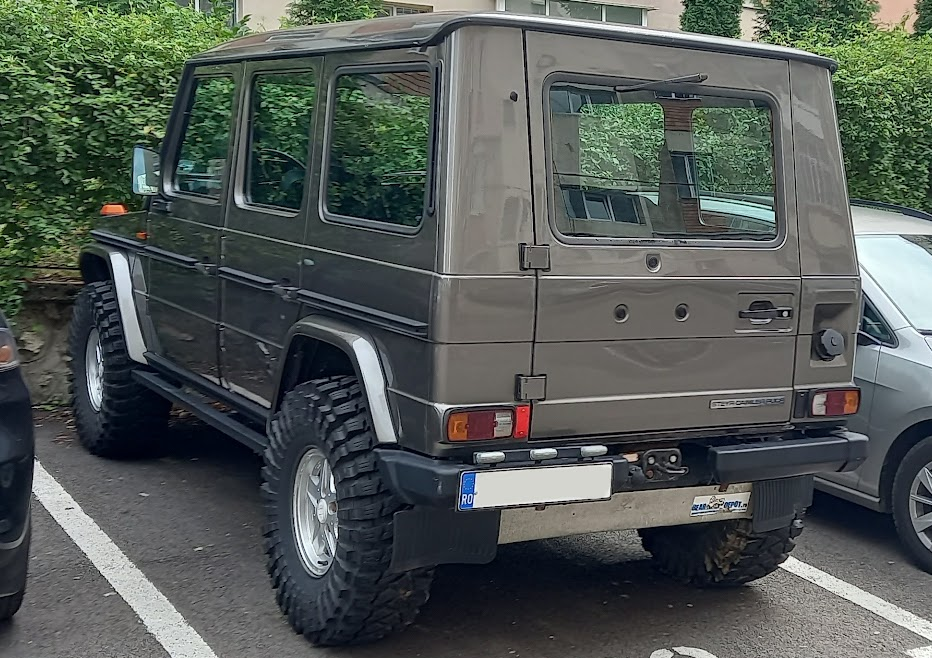
Puch G (1990–2000)

=== Engines ===
Model	Years	Configuration	Displacement	Power	Torque	0–100 km/h (0–62 mph)	Top speed	Fuel consumption/efficiency (EU-norm-urban, extra urban, combined)
Petrol engines
230 GE; G 230	1992–2001	I4 (M 102 E 23)	2,298 cc (140.2 cu in)	93 kW (126 PS; 125 bhp) at 5,100 rpm	188 N⋅m (139 lb⋅ft) at 3,500 rpm	19–20 seconds	144–147 km/h (89–91 mph)	17.2 L/100 km (13.7 mpg_{‑US}); 12.2 L/100 km (19.3 mpg_{‑US}); 16.2 L/100 km (14.5 mpg_{‑US})
Diesel engines
250 GD "Wolf" (Bundeswehr)	1990–1991	I5 (OM 602.930)	2,497 cc (152.4 cu in)	68 kW (92 PS; 91 bhp) at 4,600 rpm	154 N⋅m (114 lb⋅ft) at 2,200–2,800 rpm	27 seconds	127 km/h (79 mph)	12.8 L/100 km (18.4 mpg_{‑US}); 10.0 L/100 km (24 mpg_{‑US}) —
G 270 CDI Worker (Military)	2001–2006	I5 turbo (OM 612 DE 27 LA)	2,685 cc (163.8 cu in)	115 kW (156 PS; 154 bhp) at 3,800 rpm	400 N⋅m (295 lb⋅ft) at 1,800–2,400 rpm	—	—	—
G 280 CDI Worker (Military)	2007–2014	V6 turbo (OM 642 DE 30 LA red.)	2,987 cc (182.3 cu in)	135 kW (184 PS; 181 bhp) at 3,800 rpm	400 N⋅m (295 lb⋅ft) at 1,600–2,600 rpm	—	120 km/h (75 mph)	—
G 280 CDI EDITION.30PUR	2009	V6 turbo (OM 642 DE 30 LA red.)	2,987 cc (182.3 cu in)	135 kW (184 PS; 181 bhp) at 3,800 rpm	400 N⋅m (295 lb⋅ft) at 1,600–2,600 rpm	13 seconds	160 km/h (99 mph)	14.1 L/100 km (16.7 mpg_{‑US}); 9.8 L/100 km (24 mpg_{‑US}); 11.4 L/100 km (20.6 mpg_{‑US})*
G 280 CDI Professional	2009	V6 turbo (OM 642 DE 30 LA red.)	2,987 cc (182.3 cu in)	135 kW (184 PS; 181 bhp) at 3,800 rpm	400 N⋅m (295 lb⋅ft) at 1,600–2,600 rpm	18 seconds	160 km/h (99 mph)	14.1 L/100 km (16.7 mpg_{‑US}); 9.8 L/100 km (24 mpg_{‑US}); 11.4 L/100 km (20.6 mpg_{‑US})*
G 300 CDI Professional	2010–2019	V6 turbo (OM 642 DE 30 LA red.)	2,987 cc (182.3 cu in)	135 kW (184 PS; 181 bhp) at 3,800 rpm	400 N⋅m (295 lb⋅ft) at 1,600–2,600 rpm	18 seconds	160 km/h (99 mph)	14.1 L/100 km (16.7 mpg_{‑US}); 9.8 L/100 km (24 mpg_{‑US}); 11.4 L/100 km (20.6 mpg_{‑US})*
290 GD; G 290 DIESEL	1992–1997	I5 (OM 602 D 29)	2,874 cc (175.4 cu in)	70 kW (95 PS; 94 bhp) at 4,000 rpm	192 N⋅m (142 lb⋅ft) at 2,300 rpm	25–27 seconds	135–138 km/h (84–86 mph)	13.5 L/100 km (17.4 mpg_{‑US}); 9.8 L/100 km (24 mpg_{‑US}); 12.6 L/100 km (18.7 mpg_{‑US})
290 GD T G 290 TURBODIESEL	1998–2001	I5 (OM 602 DE 29 LA)	2,874 cc (175.4 cu in)	89 kW (121 PS; 119 bhp) at 3,800 rpm	280 N⋅m (207 lb⋅ft) at 1,900–2,300 rpm	17.2 seconds	137 km/h (85 mph)	12.0 L/100 km (19.6 mpg_{‑US}); 10.0 L/100 km (24 mpg_{‑US}); 10.9 L/100 km (21.6 mpg_{‑US})
300 GD "Wolf"	1985–1987	I5 (OM617.932)	2,998 cc (182.9 cu in)	89 kW (121 PS; 119 bhp) DIN	172 N⋅m (127 lb⋅ft)			

== W463 (1990–2018) ==
W463
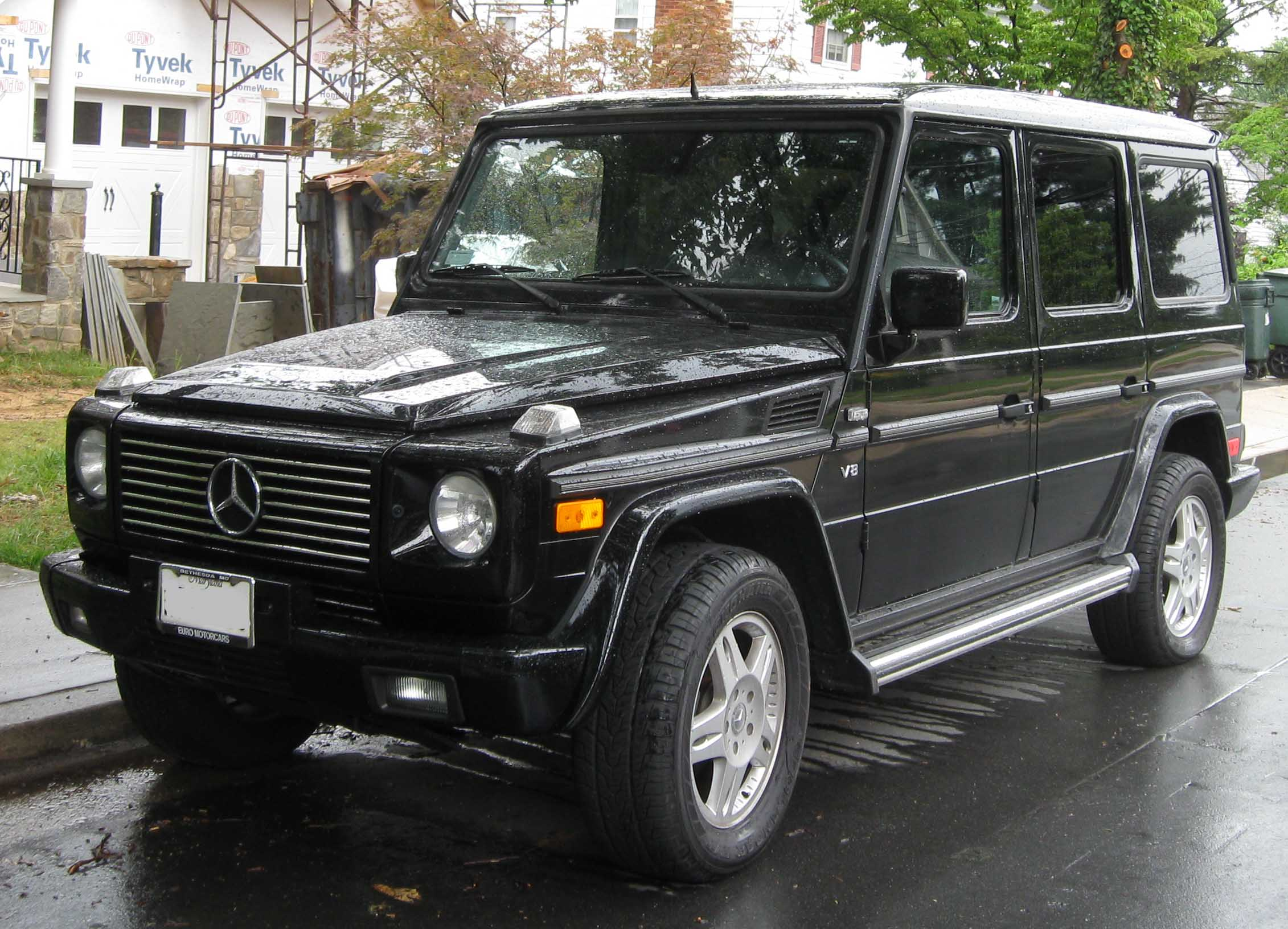

Overview
- Also called: Puch G
- Production: 1990–2018
- Model years: 1991–2018
- Designer: Bruno Sacco

Body and chassis
- Body style: 3-door SWB; 2-door SWB convertible 5-door LWB station wagon 4-door LWB landaulet
- Layout: Front engine, four-wheel drive
- Related: KSU Gazal-1

Powertrain
- Engine: petrol: 2.0 L M 102.965 E 20 I4; 2.3 L M 102.989 E 23 I4; 3.0 L M 103.987 E 30 I6; 3.2 L M 104.996 E 32 I6; 3.2 L M 112.945 E 32 V6; 3.6 L M 104.992 E 36 I6; 4.0 L M 176 DE 40 AL twin-turbo V8; 5.0 L M 117.965 E 50 V8; 5.0 L M 113.965 E 50 V8; 5.4 L M 113 E 55 V8; 5.4 L M 113 E 55 ML supercharged V8; 5.5 L M 273 KE 55 V8; 5.5 L M 157 DE 55 twin-turbo V8; 6.0 L M 117.965 E 50 (bored out) V8; 6.0 L M 279 E 60 AL twin-turbo V12; 6.3 L M 137 E 63 V12; diesel: 2.5 L OM 602.931 D 25 I5; 2.7 L OM 612.965 DE 27 LA turbo I5; 3.0 L OM 603.931 D 30 I6; 3.0 L OM 606.964 D 30 LA turbo I6; 3.0 L OM 642 DE 30 LA turbo V6; 3.5 L OM 603.972 D 35 A turbo I6; 4.0 L OM 628.962 DE 40 LA biturbo V8
- Transmission: 5-speed manual; 4-speed 4G-Tronic automatic; 5-speed 5G-Tronic automatic; 7-speed 7G-Tronic automatic

Dimensions
- Wheelbase: 2,400 mm (94.5 in) (2-door); 2,850 mm (112.2 in) (4-door)
- Length: Pre-2003: 4,661 mm (183.5 in); 2004–09: 4,714 mm (185.6 in) (LWB); 2010–18: 4,686 mm (184.5 in)
- Width: Pre-2003: 1,760 mm (69.3 in); 2004–09: 1,811 mm (71.3 in); 2004–09 AMG: 1,864 mm (73.4 in); 2010–18: 1,824 mm (71.8 in); 2010–18 AMG: 1,857 mm (73.1 in)
- Height: Pre-2002: 1,836 mm (72.3 in); 2002–09: 1,976 mm (77.8 in); 2010–18: 1,930 mm (76.0 in)
- Kerb weight: 2,580 kg (5,690 lb) (G 55 AMG)

For 1990, the W460 was extensively revised, and a new chassis number, W463, was assigned. The W463 moved the G-Class from spartan and utilitarian to a luxury model on par with the Mercedes-Benz S-Class and the luxurious Range Rover. Thus, no three-door panel vans in short and long wheelbase lengths or barn doors in the rear were offered for the W463: those features are exclusive to the W461. The W461 continued in production as military and utilitarian vehicles for the government agencies and non-government organisations.

The exterior was revised to smooth out the front end and the front fenders/wings were vertically flattened out at the front underneath headlamps. The fender flares and front end (cooling grille and headlamp bezels) were painted in body colour. The headlamps have square and slightly recessed bezels whilst the grille is narrower to give space for the front numberplate attached to the top of the bumper. The front bumpers are form-fitted and have integrated fog lamps while the rear bumpers have the integrated red rear fog lamp and white reversing lamp. The fuel filler is now covered by a panel. The side running boards were given a standard fitment. The external rear view mirrors have a new housing that pivots on anchors attached to the front doors. New revised tail lamps without white reversing lamps were fitted in the rear.

The interior was significantly updated with wood trim and leather upholstery for the first time. The centre console is smoother and better integrated with the dashboard and the lower part of the dashboard is covered with rubber pads for better knee protection in the event of a frontal collision. The electric differential lock switches are placed prominently in the middle of the dashboard with other electric switches and the instrument cluster has a smoother and more curved housing that meets the dashboard fluidly. The gauges are integrated into one panel rather than a few separate gauges attached to the instrument cluster. The climate control panel was revised to include the temperature and fan speed dials and the door panels are fully trimmed with ruffled leather paneling and soft paddings. The seats are more plush and have several defined cushions along with lumbar support.

The new features included ABS and full-time four-wheel-drive with electrically locking differentials. The engines were carried over from the W460/W461, including the 200 GE, 230 GE, and 300 GE models for petrol engines along with the 250 GD and 300 GD for diesel engines. In 1994, the Geländewagen was renamed as the G-Class when model names were revised to reflect the new corporate nomenclature.

When Mercedes-Benz didn't consider selling the G-Class in the United States, a small registered importer based in New Mexico, Europa International, Inc., began the expensive process of certifying and modifying the G-Class for the US market and started selling them in 1993. When the new G 500 was introduced in 1998, Europa International sought and received the "small-volume manufacturer status", allowing the company to be the exclusive importer and distributor of the G 500 in the United States. The sales success of the G 500 was attributed to Europa International's clever marketing toward high-end luxury clientele and led Mercedes-Benz to the decision of purchasing the distribution rights and including the G-Class in its official US model ranges.

The first generation W463 had the widest range of engines ever fitted to a Mercedes-Benz vehicle during its entire 28-year model run: from four to twelve cylinders; and from natural aspiration to supercharger, turbo, and twin turbo. Towards the end of the first-generation model run the W463 had the highest number of paint colour options at 22, including the bright and intense colours of the Crazy Color Edition.

=== Models ===
The W463 had the highest number of body variations and derivations of any post-war Mercedes-Benz:

- two-door cabriolet
- three-door station wagon with short wheelbase
- four-door pickup truck with six wheels (Mercedes-AMG G 63 6x6)
- four-door cabriolet with extended wheelbase (Mercedes-Maybach G 650 Landaulet)
- five-door station wagon with long wheelbase
- five-door station wagon with extended wheelbase (custom built by AMG)
- five-door station wagon with long wheelbase and widened track (Mercedes-Benz G 500 4x4²)

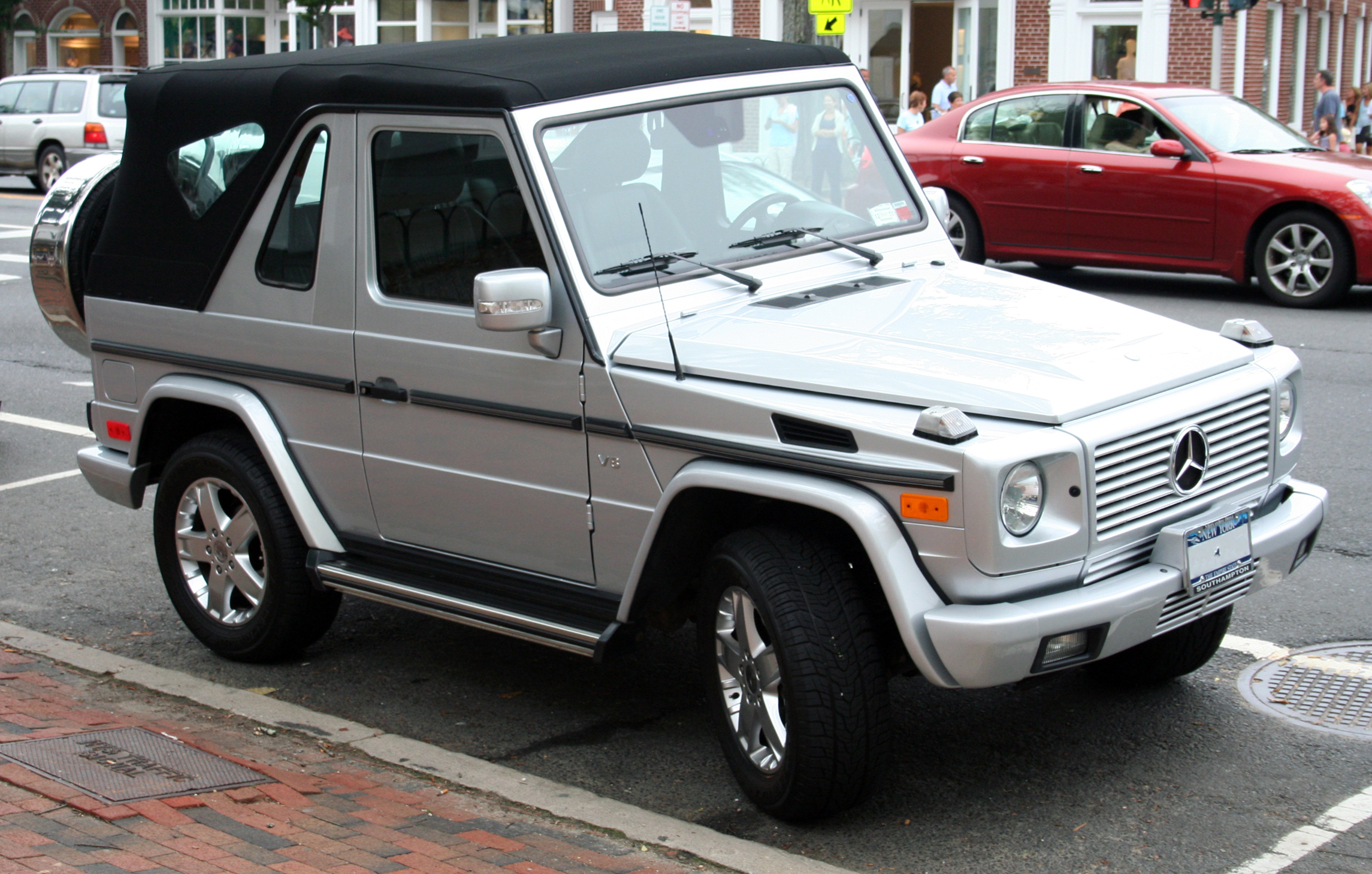
Mercedes-Benz G500 Cabrio

=== Special models and special editions ===
==== 500 GE V8 (1993) ====
Mercedes-Benz premiered a special edition of G-Class with its first-ever V8 engine at 1993 Geneva International Motor Show. The 500 GE V8 was available in 5-door, long wheelbase station wagon and for one year, 1993, only.

The completed body and chassis were shipped from Graz, Austria to AMG engineering centre in Affalterbach where the chassis was modified to accept the M117 V8 engine and beefed up for extra weight and performance. The V8 engine developed 177 kW (241 PS; 237 hp) and 375 N⋅m (277 lb⋅ft), providing the acceleration from 0 to 100 km/h (62 mph) in 11.4 seconds and the top speed of 180 km/h (112 mph).

A special paint finish, Amethyst Blue Metallic, is exclusive to the 500 GE V8 and is not available on any other Mercedes-Benz models. The paint finish is extended to the cooling grille, bumpers, mirror housings, and fender flares. The interior is trimmed with black leather, with the contrasting element in a medium grey colour, including the steering wheel. The walnut veneer was fitted to the centre console, part of the handbrake lever, the two transmission selector levers, and trim elements on the door cards.

The 500 GE V8 is equipped with many features including air conditioning, an automatic gearbox, cruise control, a sliding sunroof, heated seats, a power central locking system, and electric window winders.

The retail price for the 500 GE V8 was DM 178,250 ($107,381 US at 1993 currency exchange rate and $223,138 US (2022, adjusted)). To put the price in perspectives, a 1993 300 GE (the top-of-line G-Class in a regular production) was DM 88,500, and a 1993 W140 500 SE with M119 V8 engine was DM 129,030.

The production was initially to be limited to 500 units, signifying the "500" in model name: 446 units were actually produced and sold. Mercedes-Benz had a remaining batch of 446 M117 V8 engines when the next-generation M119 production started for W140 S-Class. The wider M119 engine could not fit the engine compartment in G-Class. The V8 engine option for G-Class was reintroduced in 1998 when the G 500 with M113 V8 engine entered into a regular production.

A Puch 500 GE V8 was offered as well: only three units were produced.

AMG offered the performance upgrade kit for 500 GE V8 with 6-litre displacement: 500 GE V8 6.0 AMG. The upgrade kit offers the higher output (220 kW (299 PS; 295 hp)), higher top speed (195 km/h (121 mph)) and quicker acceleration (10.4 seconds to 100 km/h from zero). 13 units of 500 GE V8 received the upgrade kit.

==== G 500 Classic Special-Edition (1999) ====
In 1999, the luxuriously equipped G 500 Classic Special-Edition model was unveiled to mark the 20th anniversary of the Mercedes-Benz G-Class. All Classic Special-Edition models were equipped with the 500 V8 engine, all of them received a special Almandinschwarz-Metallic (182) paintwork, which in certain lighting conditions looks black or dark aubergine purple. This limited series design inherited everything from the original classic G-Class, but benefited from the technical developments of the new generation released in 2000. All Classic Special-Edition G-Class receive unique 18" alloy wheels painted in body color inside, with exterior elements painted in vehicle color, Classic inscription strip on the side of the vehicle, stainless steel and painted spare wheel cover, new instrument cluster, equipped with Becker navigation and Hi-Fi with a multi-functional steering wheel appearing for the first time, ultrasonic reversing assist, front and rear seat heating, anti-theft alarm system, illuminated thresholds. The interior is made of black and aubergine purple Nappa leather, with black suede carpets embroidered with Classic lettering and fine burr walnut interior elements. A total of 500 Classic Special-Editions of all versions were produced, 6 in RHD configuration and 494 in LHD configuration, with the majority being long-wheelbase models and only 12 Cabrio models (the rarest G-Class Cabrio model ever produced until the end of production of the G-Class Cabrio in 2014).

==== Grand Edition (2005) ====
The 500 units of the G 500 and G 55 AMG Grand Edition were built and shipped to the United States when Mercedes-Benz decided to end the sales of G-Class in the United States for 2006 before rescinding its decision. The exterior had an exclusive Allanite Grey Magno metallic paint finish and brushed aluminium trim stripes with "Grand Edition" lettering. The interior had matte-silk wood trim on the dashboard and centre console, designo exclusive leather upholstery, and door sills with illuminated "Grand Edition" lettering.

==== G 500 Guard (2009–2018) ====
An armoured version of the long wheelbase G 500 five-door station wagon with bullet resistance level FB6 or FB7.

==== G-Class LIMITED.30 (2009) ====
The LIMITED.30 model is a special edition, celebrating the 30-year anniversary of the G-model (1979–2009). This edition includes designo platinum black paint finish, specially designed light-alloy wheels and EDITION30 lettering on the wings. The interior has designo leather in the colour "chablis" and designo trim in anthracite poplar wood.

==== G 55 AMG KOMPRESSOR "Edition 79" (2009) ====
Like the LIMITED.30 special edition, the "Edition 79" is exclusive to the Middle East market, celebrating the sales launch in 1979. This edition includes designo magno alanite grey paint finish, a crash bar at the front, carbon fibre side trim stripes, 19-inch AMG wheels with titanium finish, chrome protection grilles for the front turn signal indicators, designo leather upholstery in black/sand colour, a carbon fibre dashboard and centre console trims and an edition logo, e.g. "1 out of 79", placed in front of the gear selector. The vehicle was unveiled in 2009 at the Dubai International Motor Show.

==== BA3 Final Edition and Edition Selection (2011) ====
The BA3 Final Edition was launched in 2011 to mark the final production run of the three-door, short wheelbase station wagon. The single model variation was G 350 CDI BlueTEC. This farewell special is distinguished by body-coloured AMG flared wheel arches with 5-twin-spoke light-alloy wheels, carbon optics stripes, an AMG radiator grille, 18-inch alloys, extra chrome trims inside and outside, black leather interior offset by walnut burr veneers and ambient lighting.

At the same time, Mercedes-Benz offered the "Edition Select" special for the five-door model, G 500. Edition Selection applies the same special edition treatment to the G 500/G 550 even though the five-door long wheelbase station wagon would continue for several more years.

==== G 55 AMG long "mastermind" Limited (2012) ====
As a brand awareness collaboration for the Fashion Week, Mercedes-Benz Japan and mastermind JAPAN built five units for the Japanese market. Externally, the chrome trims and wheels were done in black paint finish, and two stickers were affixed to the side panels at the rear. The mastermind JAPAN skull and bone badges were affixed to the headrests and spare wheel cover. The interior was finished in black leather trim, with the roof liner finished in light grey Alcantara.

==== G 550 Night Edition (2013–2015) ====
Exclusive to the Japanese market, 100 units of the G 550 Night Edition were produced with a black paint finish, AMG badges on the front fenders/wings and five twin-spoke, aluminium wheels finished in titanium grey. Two choices of interior colours were offered: porcelain white (60 units) and classic red (40 units). The dashboard and centre console were trimmed with designo piano lacquer black wood. The roof liner was Alcantara in anthracite colour. The sales price was ¥13,900,000 JPY.

==== G-Class Cabriolet "Final Edition 200" (2013–2014) ====
To commemorate the production end of the two-door cabriolet, Mercedes-Benz introduced the "Final Edition 200" with the G 500 being the only model variation. All of the 200 units had been sold out prior to its premiere at 2013 Frankfurt Auto Show. Externally, the soft top and tonneau cover are beige in colour, the grille is chrome-coloured, and the 5-spoke light-alloy wheels are paint in titanium grey. The B-pillars are fitted with "Final Edition 200" badges. The interior received designo leather seats and door panels coloured in ecru with black trim, satin-finished light brown poplar wood trim, and an AMG performance steering wheel.

==== G 500 4×4² ====
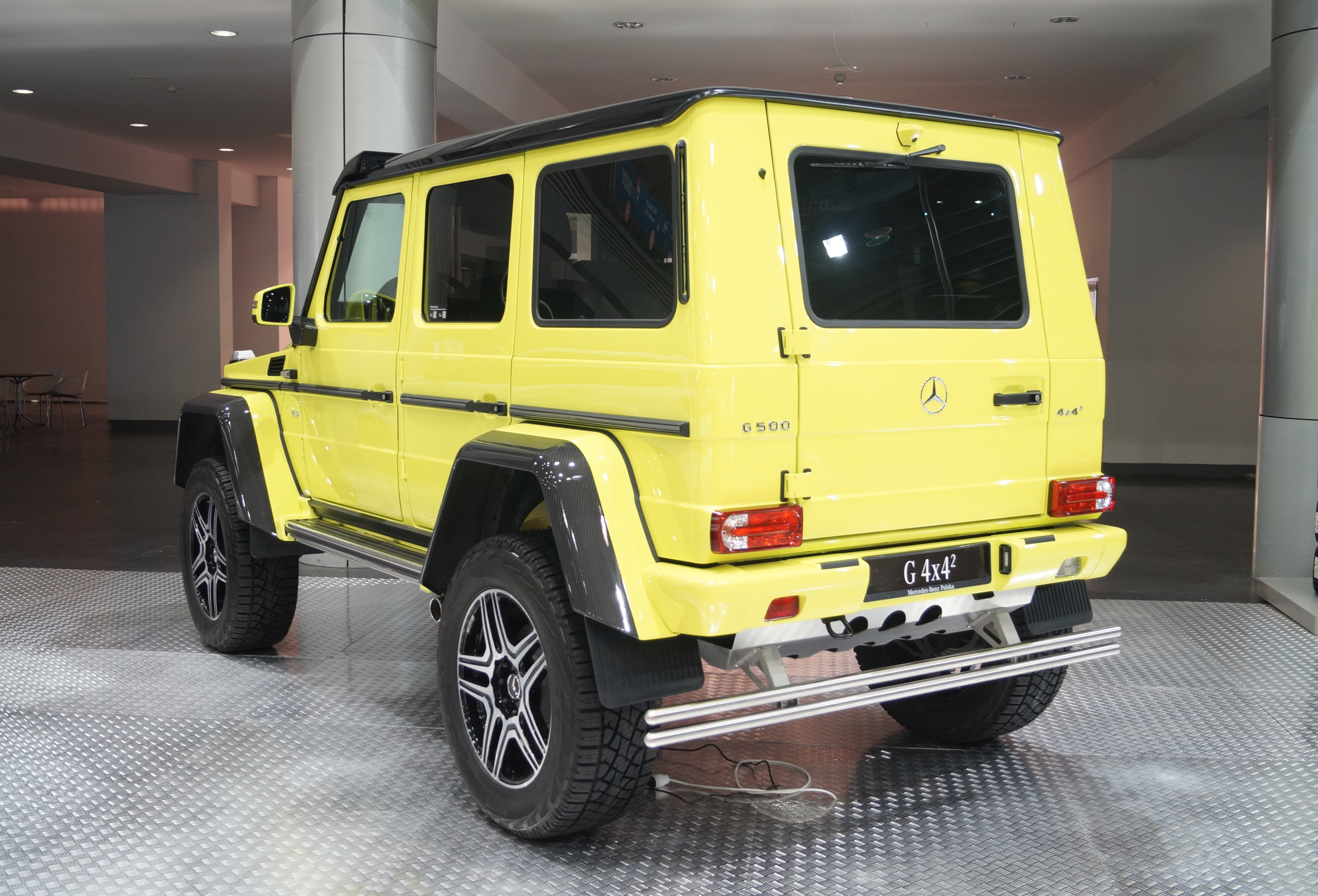
Rear quarter view of G 500 4×4²

Continuing with the G 63 AMG 6×6 formula, Mercedes-Benz introduced the G 500 4×4², using the body of the long wheelbase 5-door station wagon on a shortened chassis from the G 63 AMG 6×6. The G500 4×4², along with the G 500/G 550, received a new 4.0-litre biturbo V8 (M176), producing 310 kW (416 hp). The exterior is the same as the Mercedes-AMG G 63 and G 65 despite the G 500 4×4² not being a Mercedes-AMG edition.

==== Mercedes-Maybach G 650 Landaulet (2017) ====
Following the success of the G 63 AMG 6×6 and G 500 4×4², Mercedes-Benz introduced the first SUV under the sub-brand name Mercedes-Maybach at the Geneva Motor Show in March 2017. The G 650 Landaulet used the extended chassis with the portal axles and raised suspension system from the G 500 4×4². The rear end of the G 650 Landaulet was built from the rear part of the W463 cabriolet with a folding fabric roof covering the rear half of the body behind the B-pillar. The rear passenger doors with no wheel-opening cut-out were from the G 55 with extended wheelbase (2001). The front end is from the Mercedes-AMG G 65 with more chrome trim. The light alloy wheels and extendable side running boards are chrome plated. The powertrain is from the G 65 with the 463 kW (621 hp) biturbo V12.

Like the original Maybach 62 Landaulet, a division wall is installed behind the driver and front passenger. The second row seats are moved further back from the rear passenger doors and are the same rear seats as used in the Mercedes-Maybach S-Class. A second control panel and centre console is installed behind the division wall toward the rear. The dashboard above the second set is one set of the two front passenger's dashboards with a glove box and hold two large LED monitors.

The sales price was €749,700, and the production was limited to 99 units.

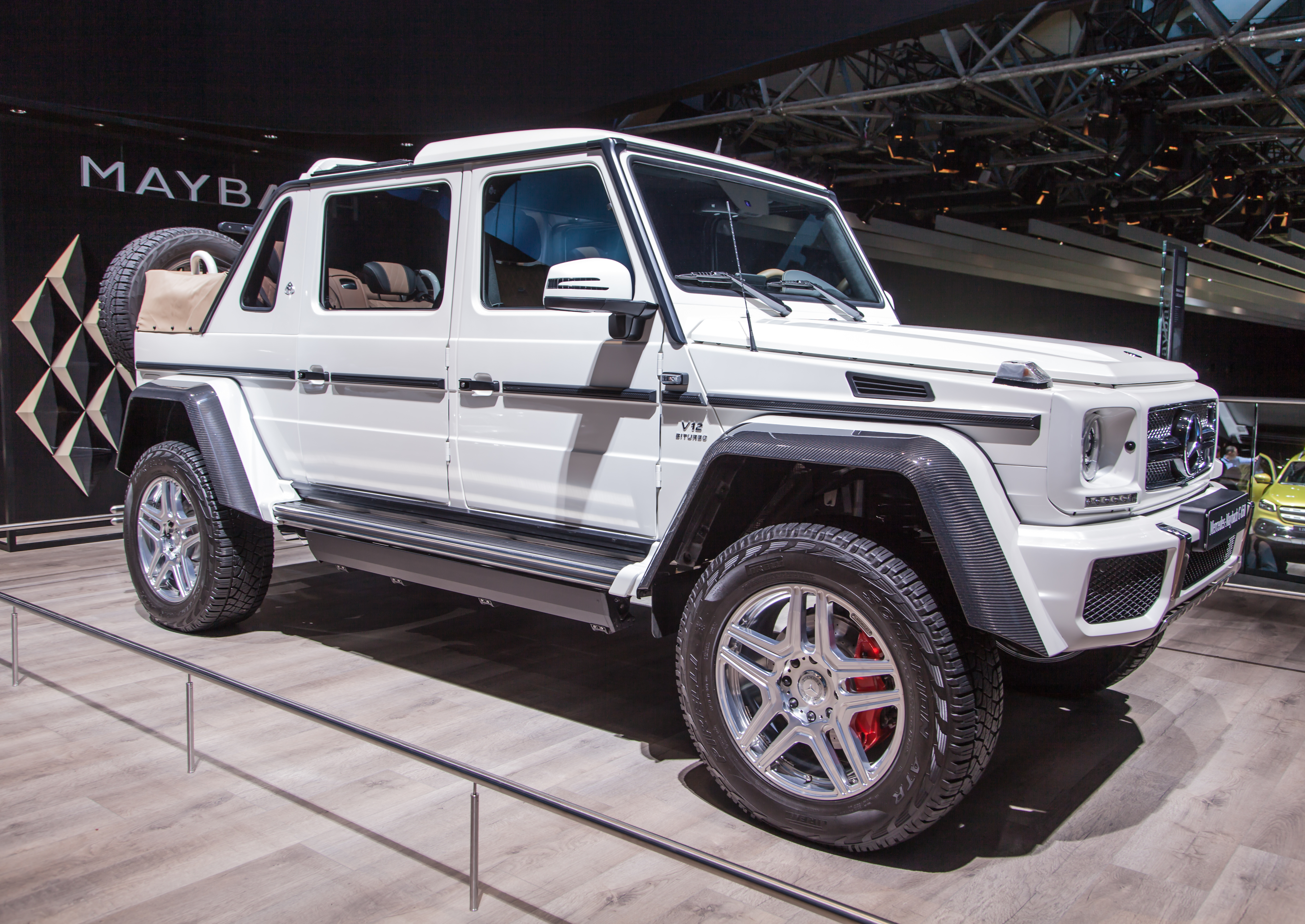
Mercedes-Maybach G 650 Landaulet

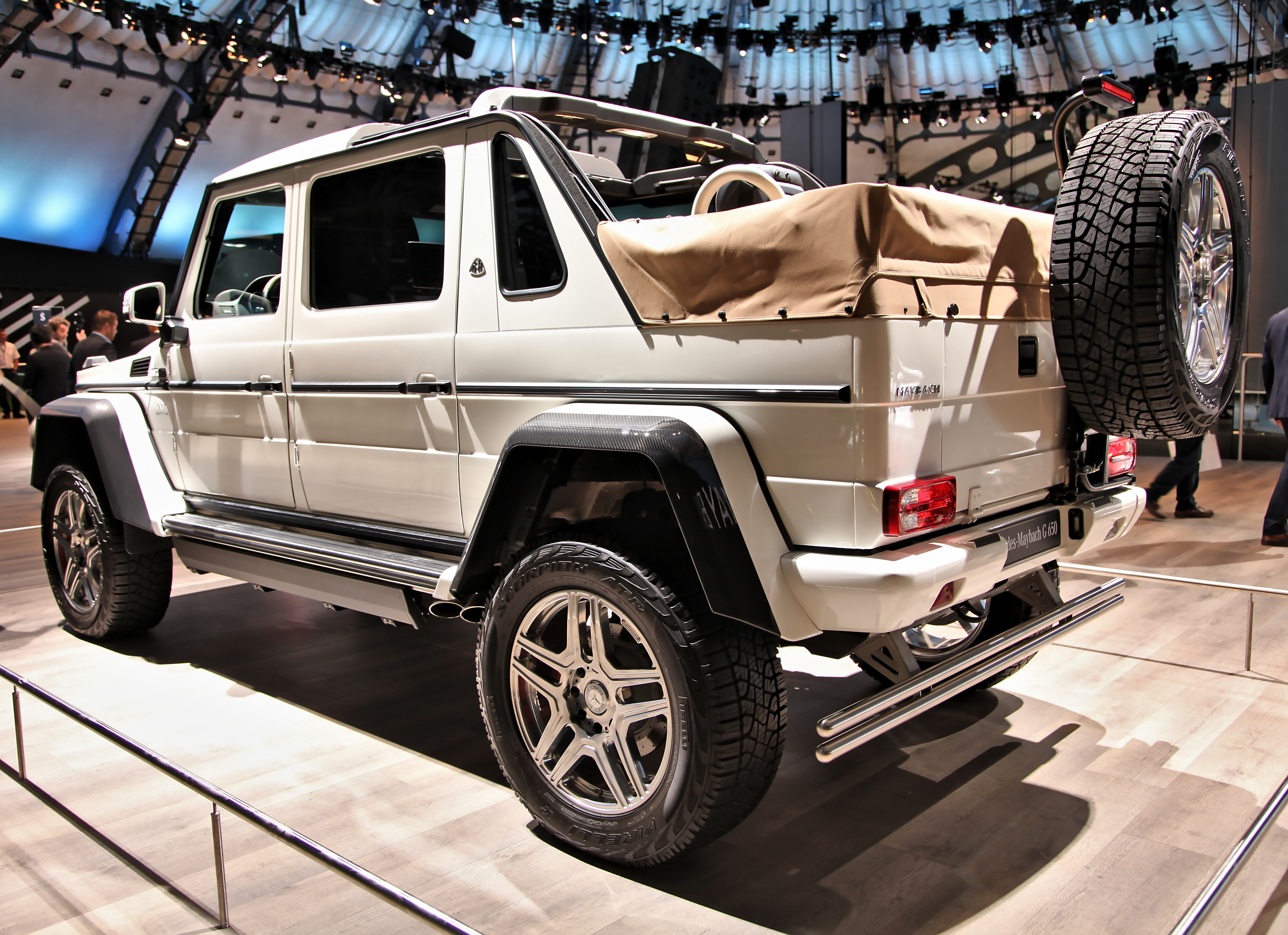
The rear view of the Mercedes-Maybach G 650 Landaulet

=== AMG models ===
==== 500 GE 6.0 AMG (1993–1995) ====
For the first time, an AMG version of the G-Class was offered in 1993 with the 500 GE 6.0 AMG. The M 117.965 E 50 engine was bored from 5 to 6 litres, producing 243 kW (326 hp) and 525 N⋅m (387 lb⋅ft). The increased output did not make the 500 GE 6.0 AMG much faster with a time of 10.9 seconds for 0–100 km/h (62 mph). Only thirteen units were built and it was available in long wheelbase form only.

==== G 36 AMG (1994–1997) ====
After AMG entered into co-operation with Mercedes-Benz in 1993, the G 36 AMG was introduced and fitted with the M104.992, the same engine as found in the C 36 AMG and E 36 AMG.

==== G 43 AMG (1997–1998) ====
A total of 38 units of the G 43 AMG were produced between 1997 and 1998, all of them were special orders with country code "293 Company Vehicle", mostly for VIPs and probably secret services. Six of them bore 463.233 chassis numbers, as though they were G 320 LWBs that had their V6 engine replaced with a type M113.982 V8 engine. Bizarrely, the remaining 32 units were coded 463.241, meaning that they were meaning to be G 500 LWB that had the M113.982 AMG 4.3-litre engine fitted in lieu of the M113.962 standard 5-litre engine.

Ten G 43 AMG were produced for the Japanese market.

==== G 63 AMG V12 (2002) ====
The G 63 AMG V12 had a very limited production run with reportedly five units built between 2001 and 2003. It was the first G-Class with a V12 engine before Mercedes-AMG officially introduced the more powerful G 65 AMG. The engine produced 326 kW (443 PS; 437 hp) and propelled the G 63 AMG V12 to 100 km/h (62 mph) in 6.5 seconds. The retail price was € 189,329. Neither Mercedes-Benz nor AMG publicised the G 63 AMG V12: no sales brochures, advertisements, or exhibitions. Instead, the prospective buyers were selected from the AMG customer base and invited to purchase one. One of the five units, purchased new by the Dubai royal family, was sold in 2024 for $ 398,750 USD at an R.M. Sotheby's auction.

==== G 55 AMG (2002–2004) and G 55 AMG Kompressor (2004–2012) ====
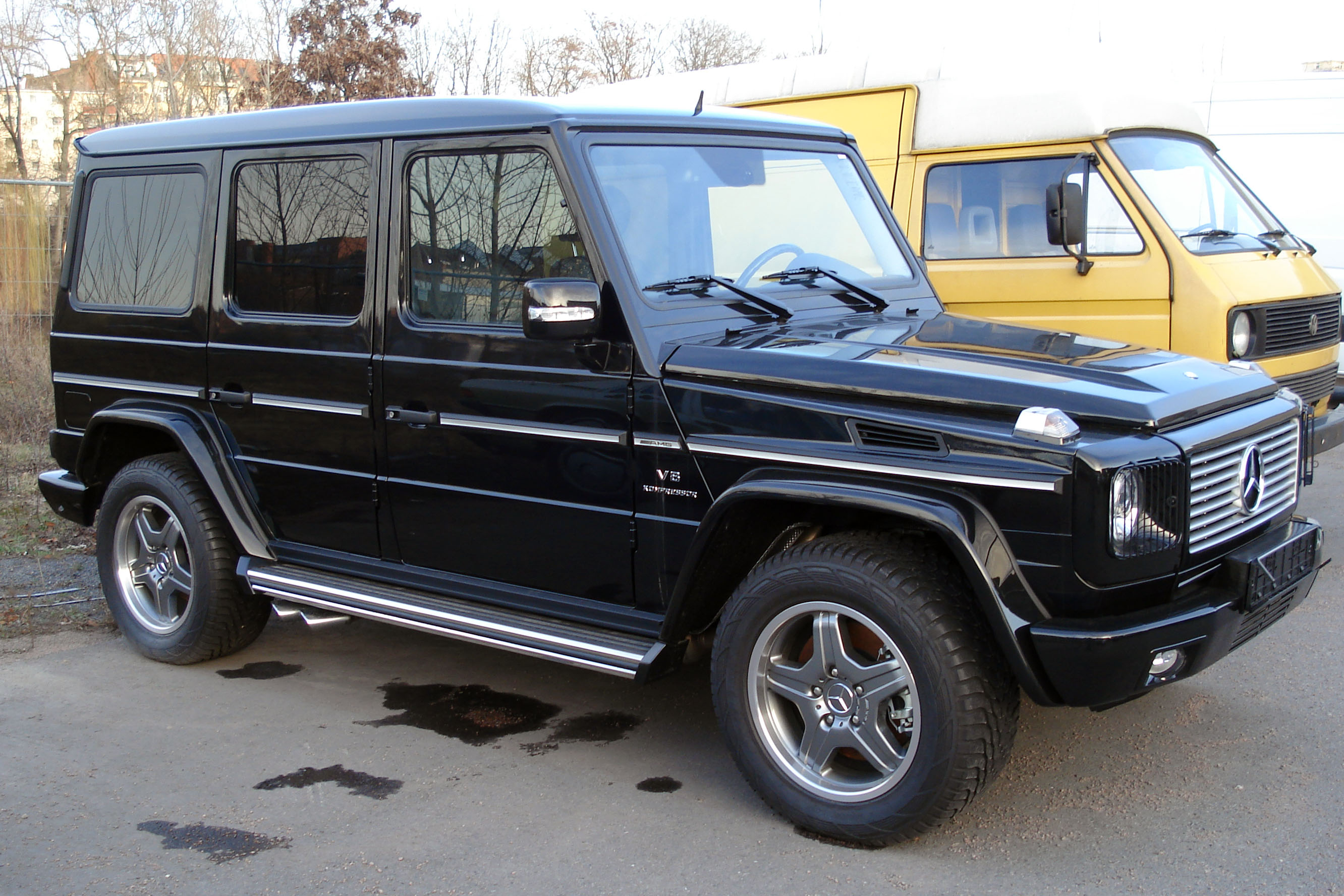
G 55 AMG

Citing the sales success of the G 500 in the United States and the absorption of AMG into DaimlerChrysler AG, Mercedes-Benz began to expand the AMG versions to several models, including the G-Class. To coincide with the official launch of the G-Class in the United States, Mercedes-Benz introduced the 55 AMG along with the G 500 in 2001 for the 2002 model year. The G 55 AMG visually did not differ from the G 500 other than side exhaust pipes, wider tyres, AMG five-spoke wheels, chrome tip at bottom of front bumper, and AMG lettering in the rear. The G 55 AMG became the favourite of celebrities and the wealthy.

For the 2005 model year, AMG revised the G 55 AMG by adding a supercharger to the 5.4-litre V8 engine, increasing the output to 350 kW (469 hp).

In 2009, to differentiate the G 55 AMG KOMPRESSOR from the G 500 visually, AMG changed the radiator grille to three thick fins, added the embossed metal KOMPRESSOR lettering underneath the V8 badge on the front fenders/wings, and introduced new light-alloy wheels in titanium grey and three new metallic paint colours (Calcite White, Periclase Green, and Teallite Blue). The 0–100 km/h (62 mph) acceleration was reduced from 7.4 to 5.6 seconds. Yet, the top speed remained at 210 km/h (130 mph). The engine was upgraded again for 2006 (2007MY in USA) to 368 kW (493 hp) then again to 373 kW (500 hp) for 2008 (2009MY in USA).

==== G 63 AMG (2012–2018) ====
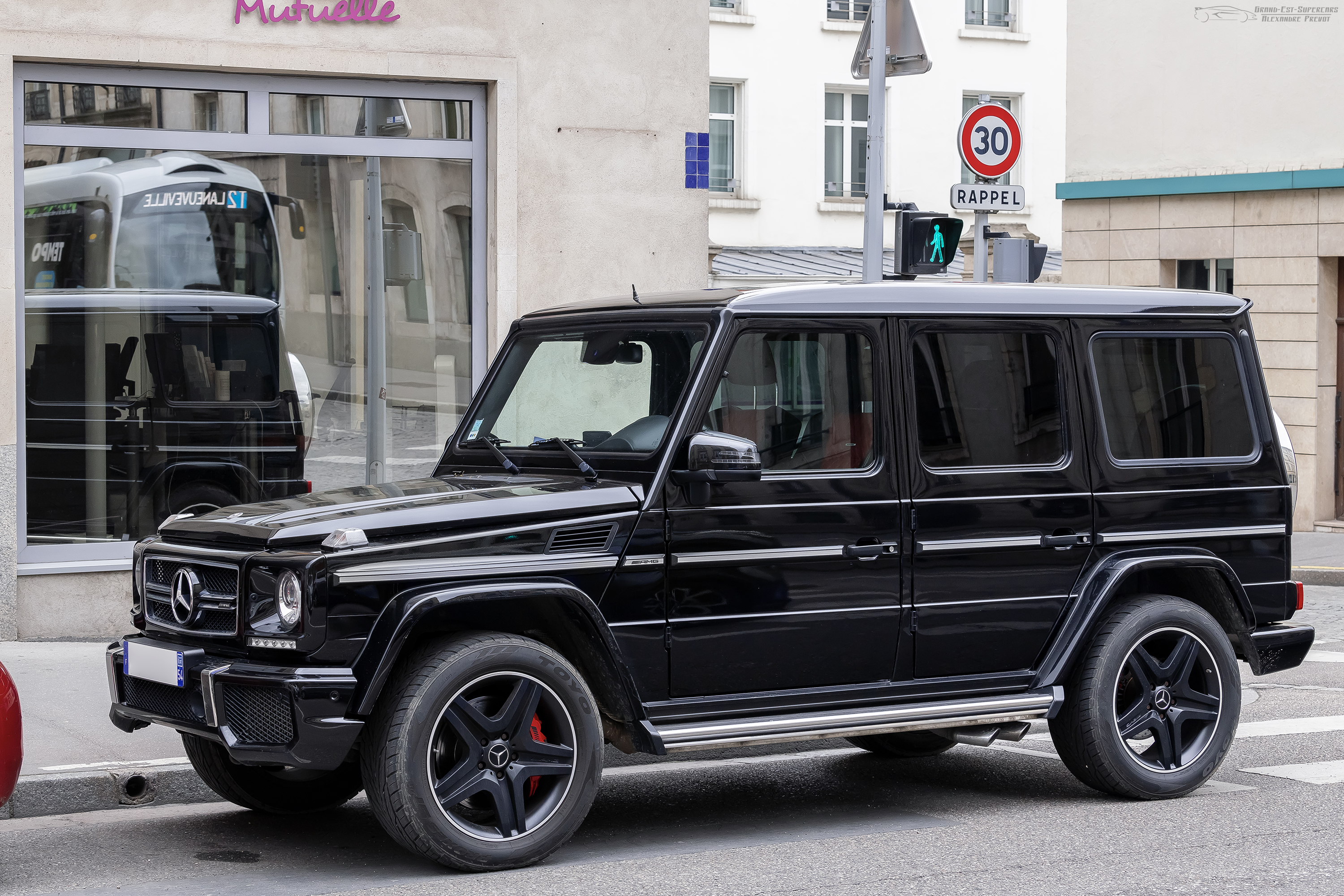
G 63 AMG

The supercharged 5.4-litre V8 was replaced by the new 5.5-litre biturbo V8 for 2012 (2013MY in USA) for better fuel consumption and lower emissions. AMG made some more changes to the exterior to give the G 63 AMG a more "brawly" appearance: single horizontal fin with twin chrome edges in the middle of the radiator grille with a more prominent three-pointed star ornament in the middle, a new light-alloy wheel design, three enlarged airflow inlets on both sides and in the middle of the front bumper, vertical chrome strips to cover the small bumper guards and exterior rear-view mirrors from the GL-Class and ML-Class. The mechanical upgrade was an AMG sports exhaust system with high-gloss chrome inserts, larger AMG high performance brakes with six-piston fixed calipers at the front from the ML 63 AMG and revised suspension and damper settings for more dynamic handling characteristics. The new E-SELECT gear selector from the Mercedes-Benz SLS replaced the standard gear selector.

For 2016, the name was changed to Mercedes-AMG G 63.

==== G 65 AMG (2012–2018) ====
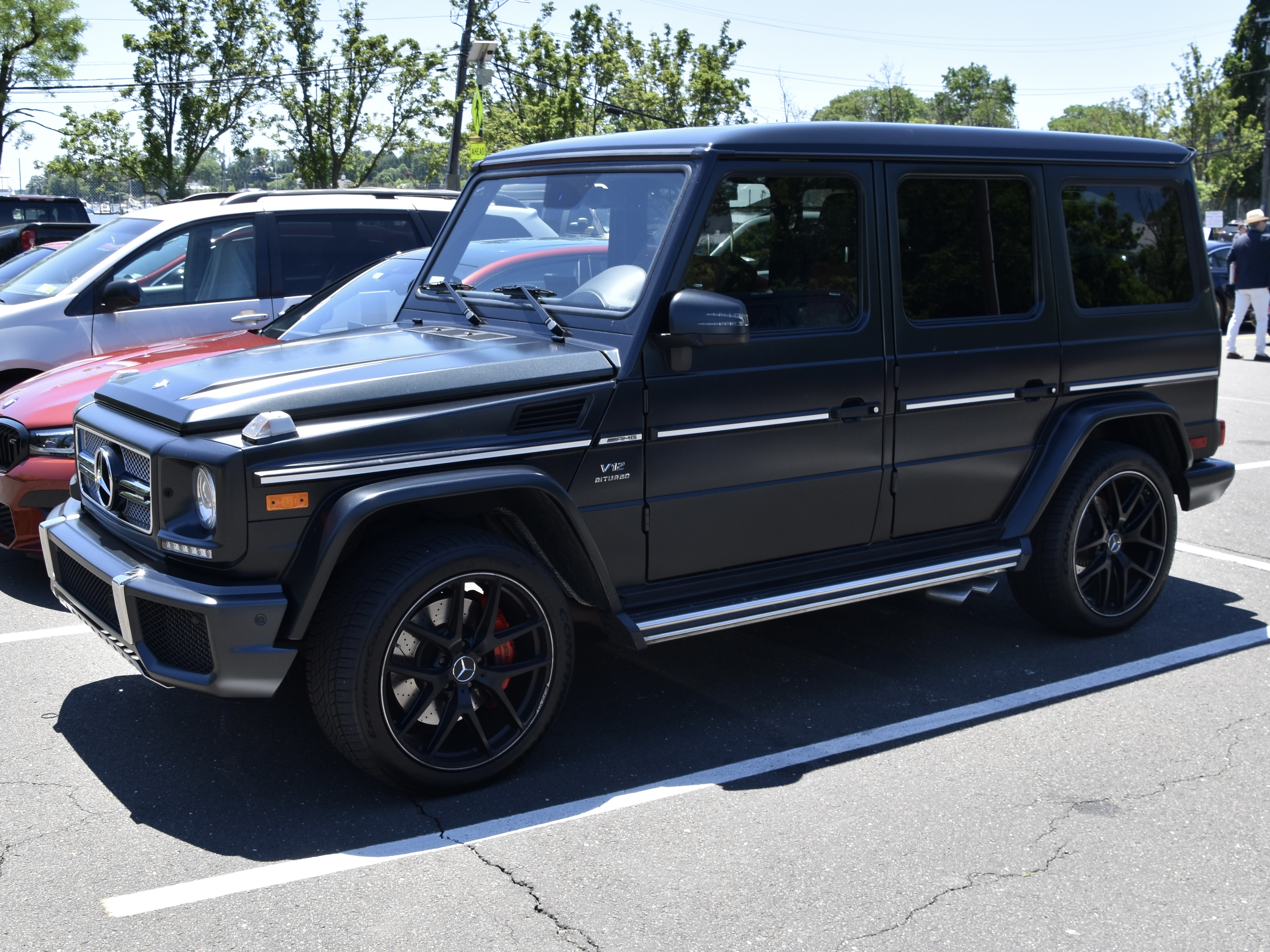
G 65 AMG

The G 63 AMG V12, built in 2002, demonstrated the feasibility of installing a V12 engine in the G-Class. The new G 65 AMG was introduced at the same time as the G 63 AMG V8, making the G 65 AMG the third production passenger SUV to have a V12 engine, with the Lamborghini LM002 (built from 1986 to 1993) being the first one. The G 65 AMG is powered by a twin-turbocharged M279 V12 engine, and is otherwise equipped the same as the G 63 AMG, aside from minor cosmetic differences, with V12 BITURBO badges on the front fenders/wings, floor mats and seat backs.

Like the G 63, the name was changed to Mercedes-AMG G 65 for 2016.

==== G 63 AMG 6×6 (2013–2015) ====
To mark the thirtieth anniversary of G-Wagen production, Mercedes-Benz introduced the new stretched version with six-wheel-drive system and portal axles. The G 63 AMG 6×6 was derived from a model developed specifically for the Australian Army in 2007. Despite the heavy weight and large dimensions, the G 63 AMG 6×6 could accelerate to 100 km/h (62 mph) in six seconds and reach a top speed of 160 km/h (99 mph).

The consumer reception of the G 63 AMG 6×6 was stronger than anticipated, and Mercedes-Benz sold slightly more than 100 units, with the last customer delivery taking place in May 2015.

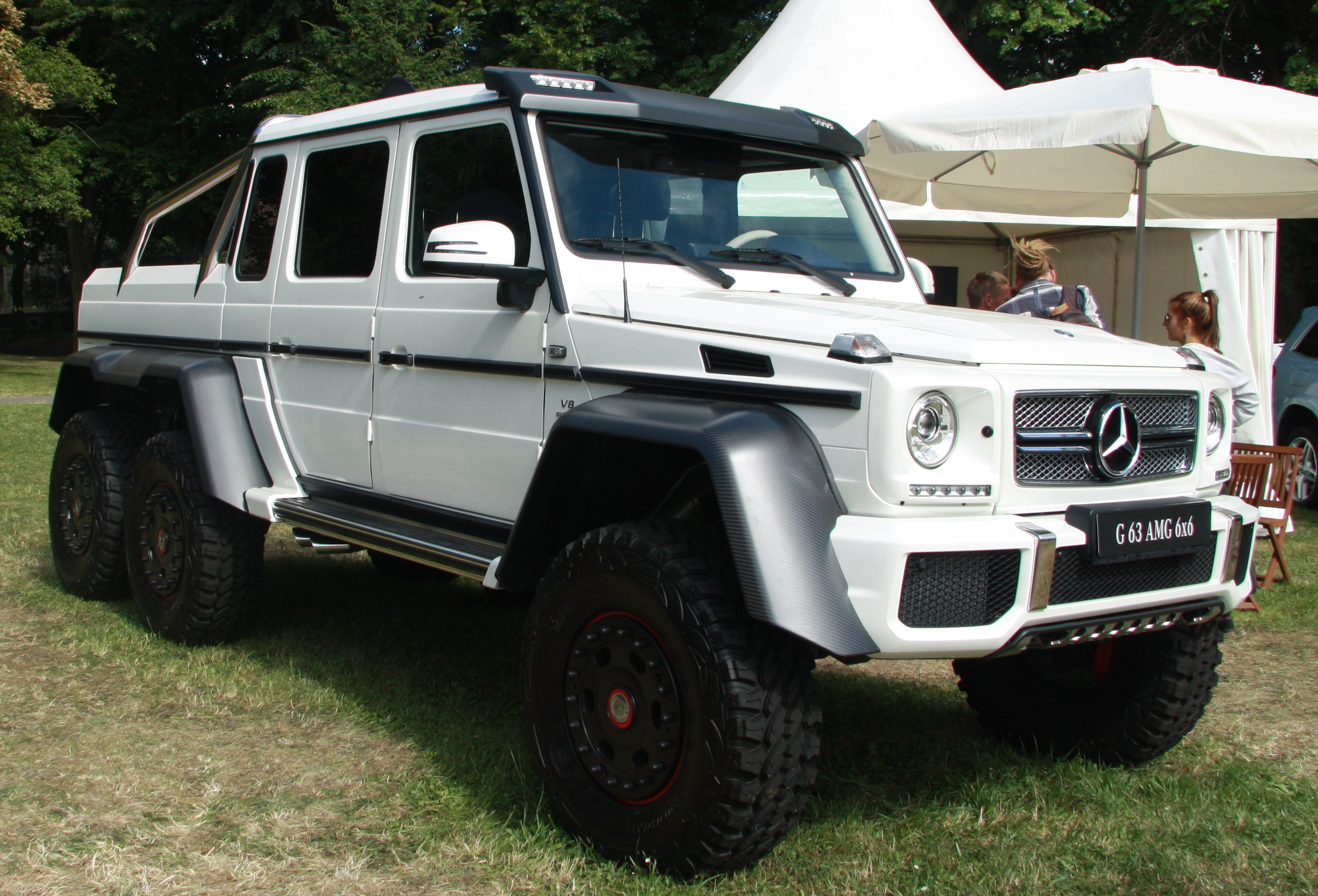
Mercedes-Benz G 63 AMG 6×6

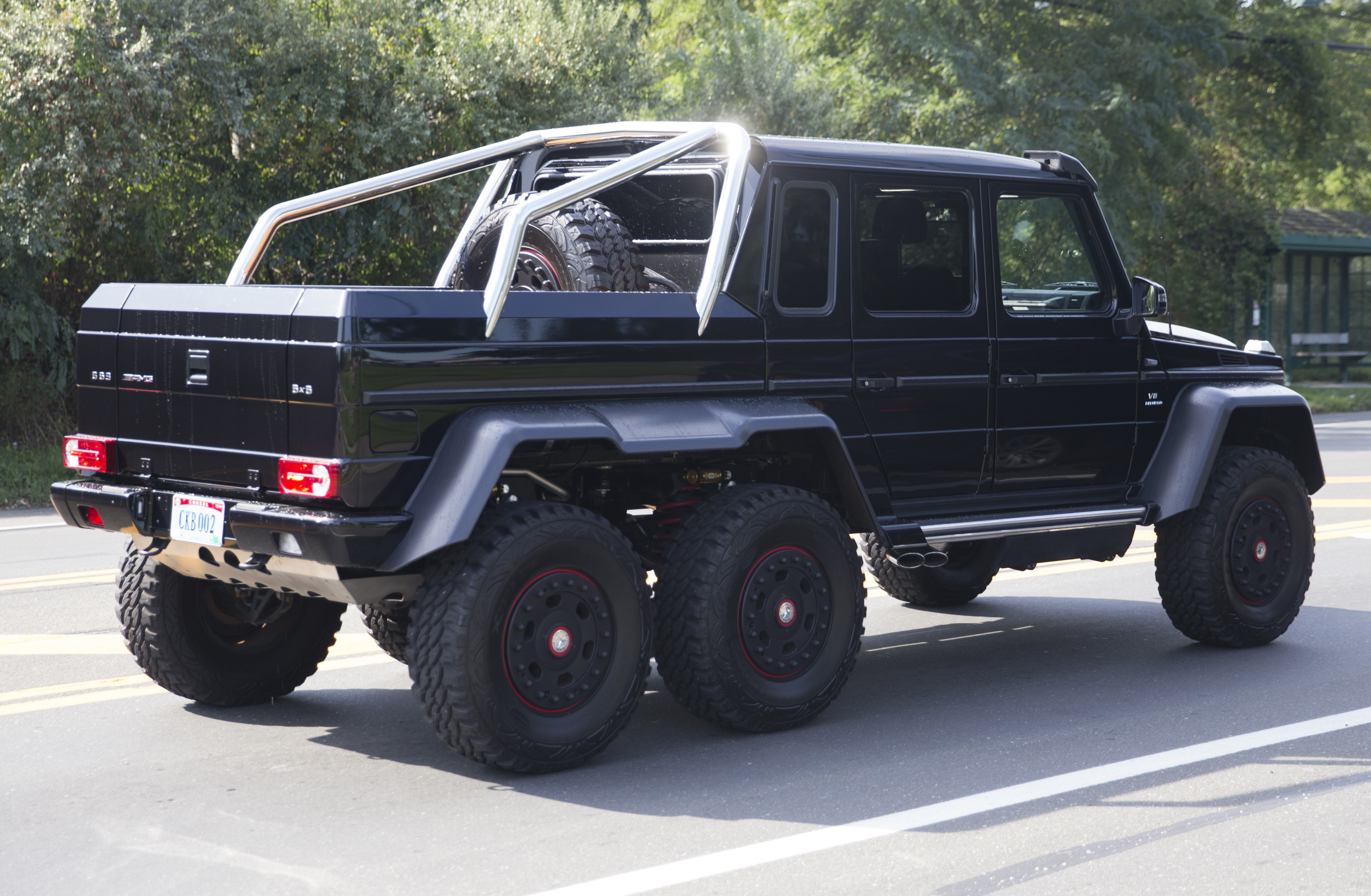
Rear quarter view of the Mercedes-Benz G 63 6×6

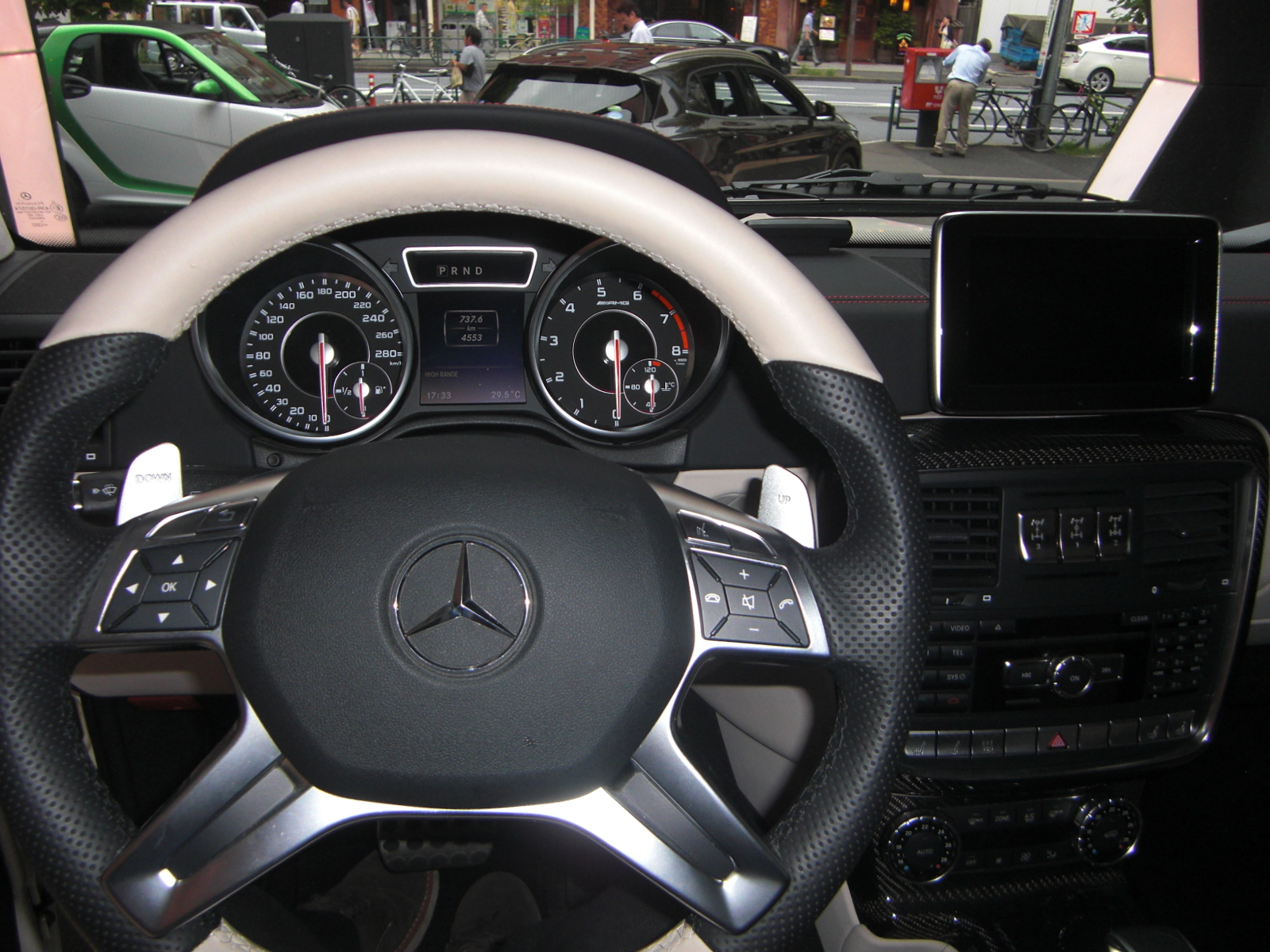
Mercedes-Benz G 63 6×6 dashboard

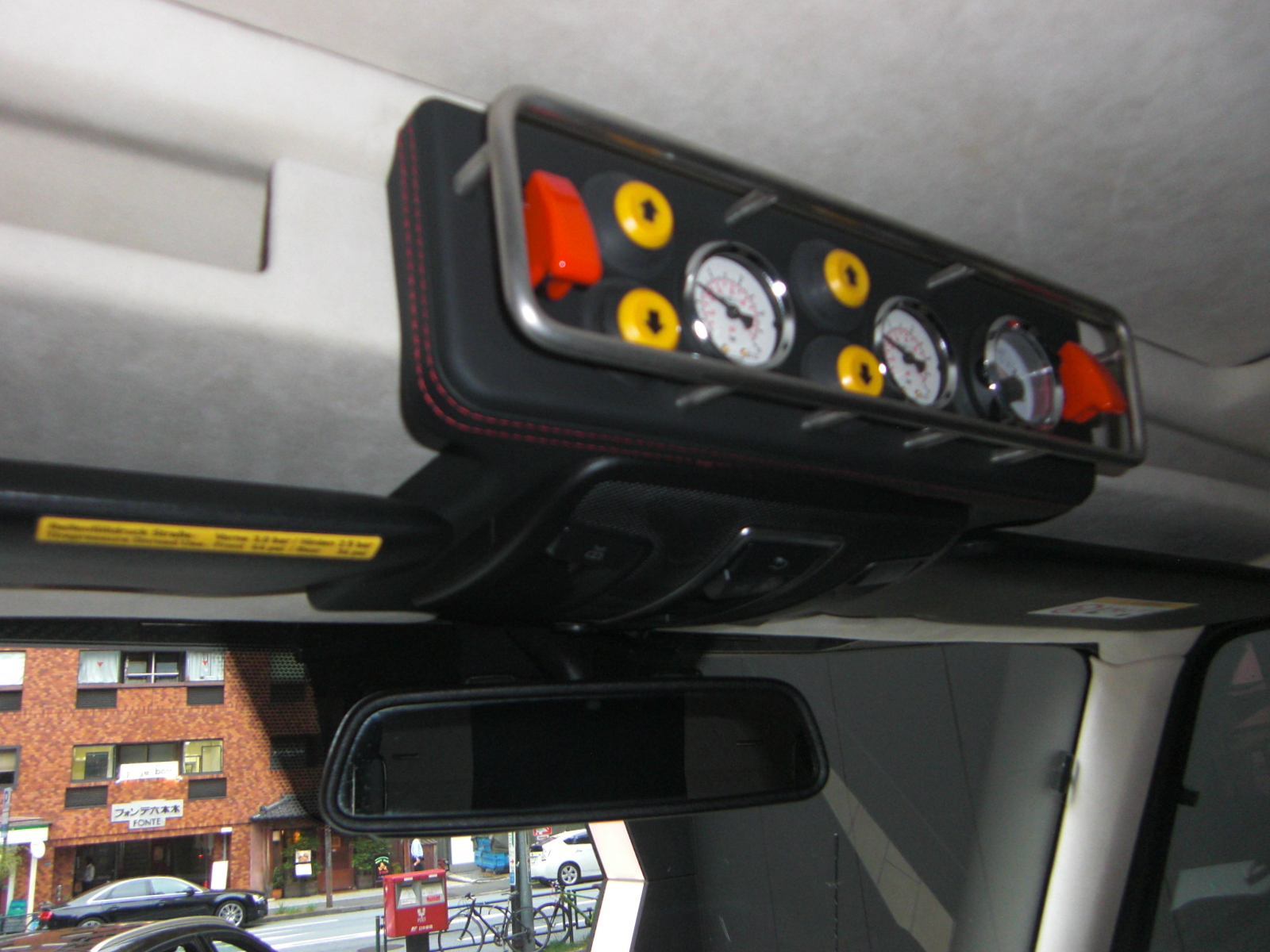
Mercedes-Benz G 63 6×6 tyre pressure regulation switches

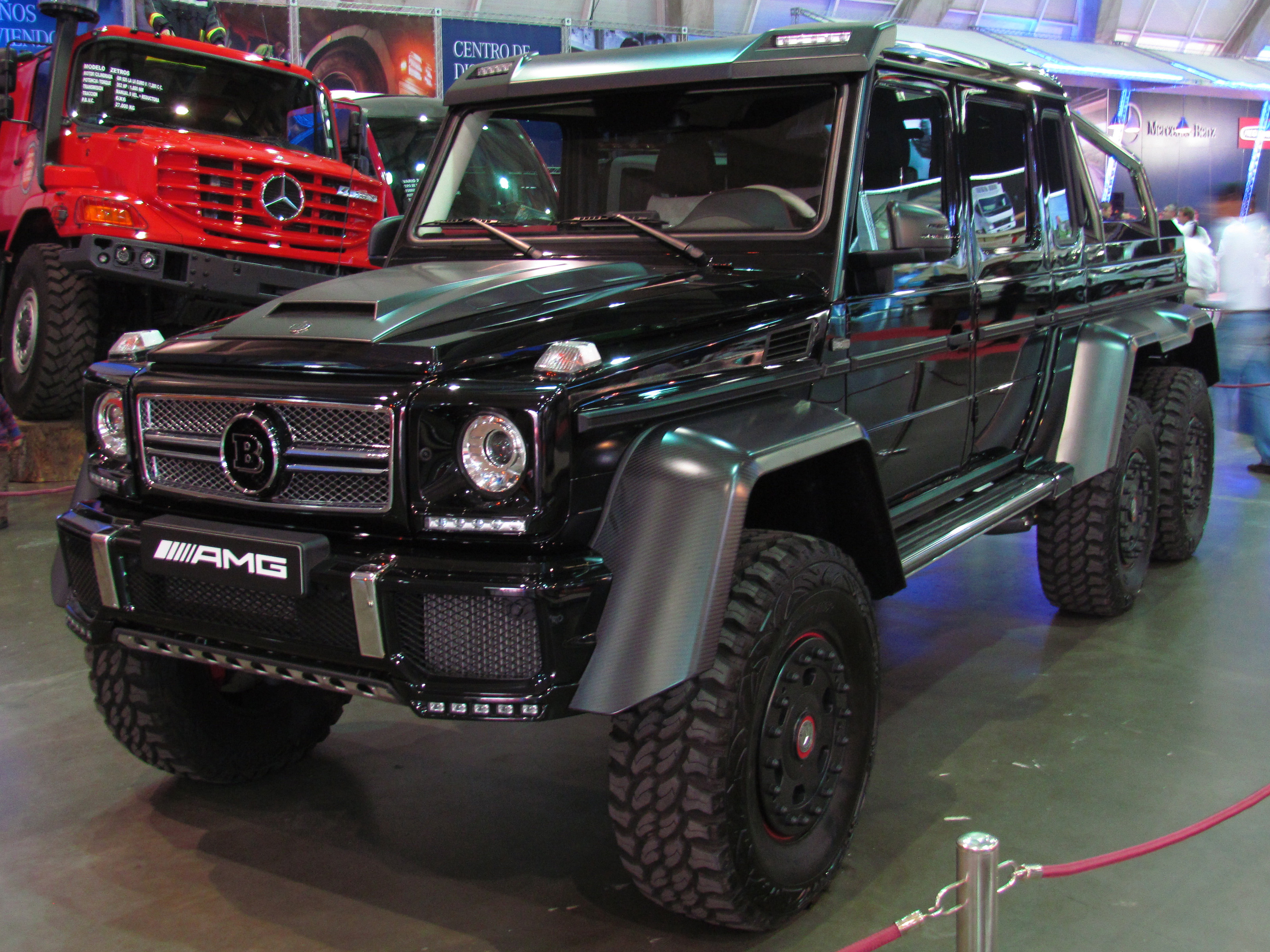
Brabus G 63 700 AMG 6×6

=== Concept cars ===
==== Mercedes-Benz G-Wagen Light Armoured Patrol Vehicle 6.X CONCEPT (2010) ====
It is an armoured patrol vehicle developed with EADS, based on LAPV 5.4. It included a diesel engine, 1.3 tonnes of cargo capacity, a monocoque full steel body, compact 2,850 mm (112.2 in) wheelbase, modular armour plate and mine deflector plate underneath the floor, adjustable variable lift front and rear coil-over air shock absorbers with a maximum of 450 mm (17.7 in) of ground clearance and hydraulic brakes with four ventilated discs. EADS provided the communication technology: vehicle data recorder system, integrated communication system for UHF or VHF bands, integrated mobile command, control and information system, and jamming system. The vehicle was unveiled in EUROSATORY 2010.

==== Ener-G-Force (2012) ====
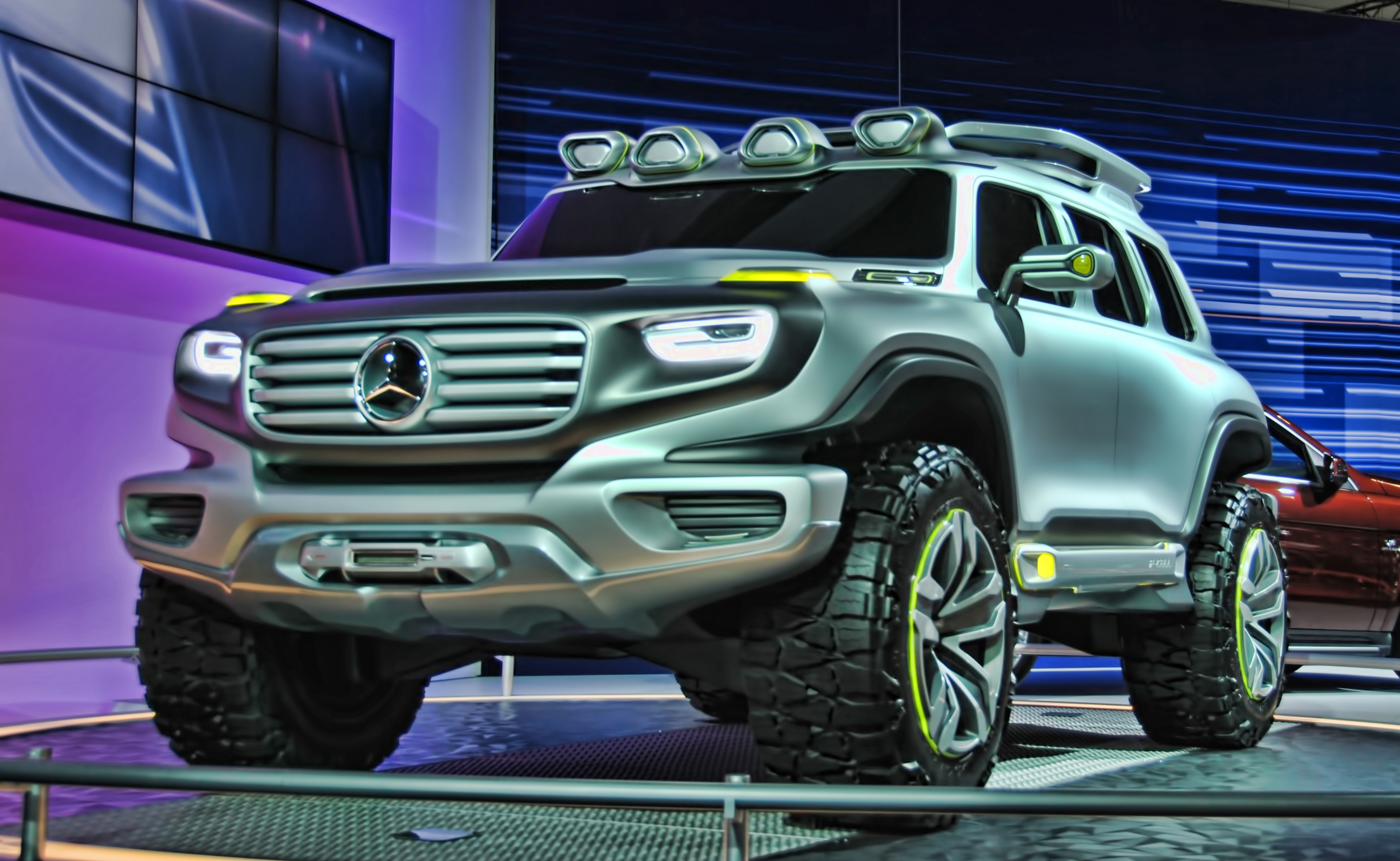
Mercedes-Benz Ener-G Force

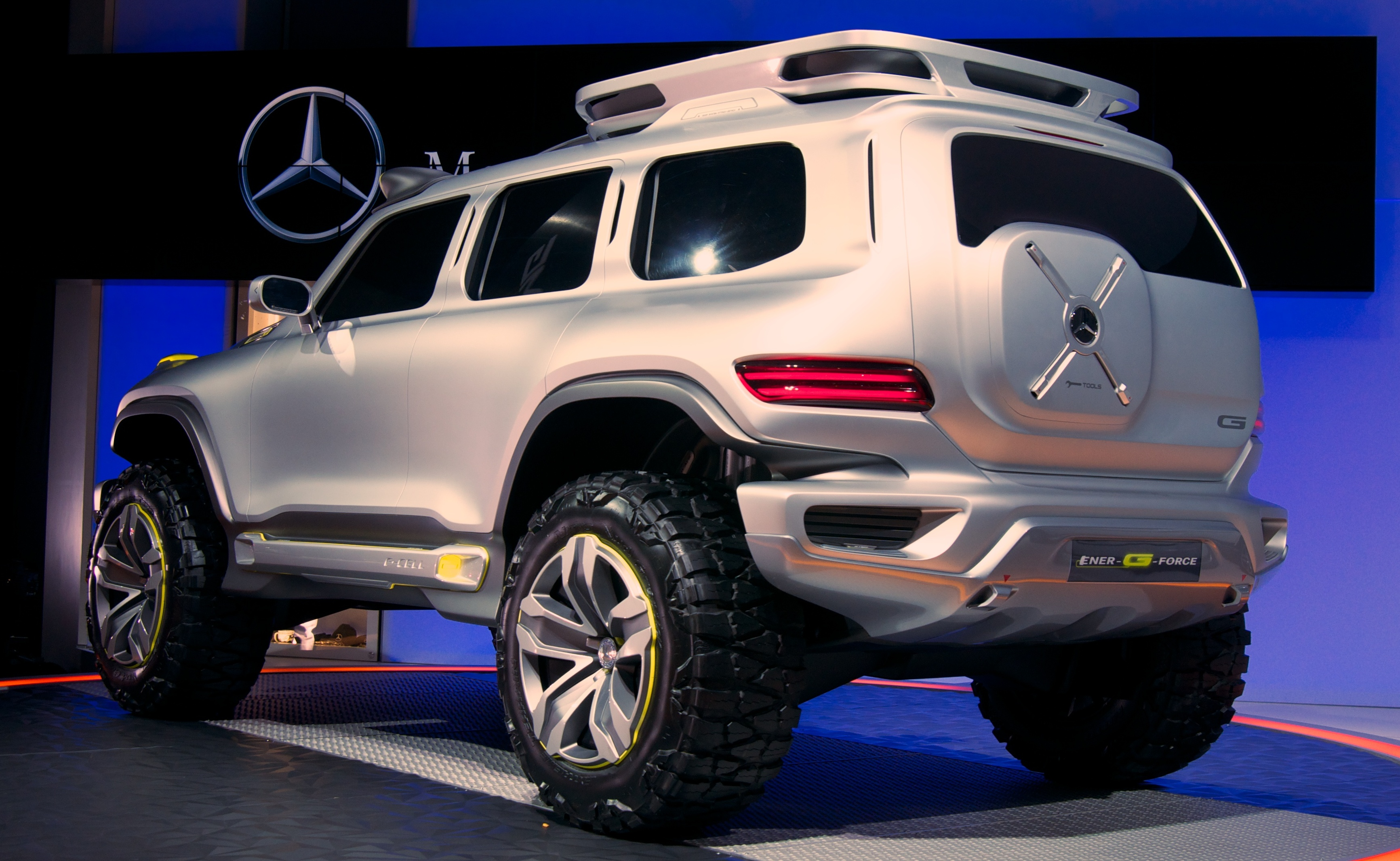
The rear view of the Mercedes-Benz Ener-G Force

The Ener-G-Force was a concept vehicle in response to the Los Angeles Design Challenge 2012 for a future police car. The vehicle was unveiled at the 2012 LA Auto Show. The concept vehicle was hydrogen-powered with fuel cells generating the electricity to the electric motors inside the wheel hubs. A roof rack contained the water tanks with a hydrogen converter, and the body included a three-panel greenhouse, 20-inch wheels and side skirts illuminating the charge and operation status of energy packs.

=== Marketing ===
The W463 was positioned in the marketplace as a luxury passenger vehicle to compete with the likes of Bentley. After Mercedes-Benz launched the G-Class in the United States with the G 500 and G 55 AMG models, the G-Class became very popular with celebrities, film stars, and the wealthy. The G-Class has appeared in numerous films, television series, and music videos ever since.

As part of Mercedes-Benz's attempt to demonstrate the off-road capability of the G-Class SUV, seven G-Class vehicles took a journey from Halls Creek in Western Australia to Wiluna. However, shock absorbers on six of the vehicles (5 civilian G 350s and 1 military model) were broken during their trip on the corrugations of the Canning Stock Route on day 7. Mercedes-Benz Australia later arranged for the replacement shock absorbers to land in Perth, before transferring to a light plane destined for a remote Aboriginal settlement close to Well 33, about 1000 km from Wiluna. The parts would be delivered by the sole surviving vehicle, a G-Professional.

=== End of production debacle and revised decisions ===
Mercedes-Benz announced that 2005 would be the final year of the G-Class to be sold in the United States, citing the new GL-Class as its successor. The 500 units of G 500 and G 55 AMG Grand Edition were built and shipped to the United States. However, an unexpected order placed by the U.S. Marine Corps for 157 Interim Fast Attack Vehicle (IFAV) based on the G-Class, replacing its ageing, slow, and cumbersome Desert Patrol Vehicles, caused Mercedes-Benz to rescind its decision and to continue offering the G-Class in the United States.

This Grand Edition also led to the rumours of the end of production of the W463 in 2006. A few factors contributed to the rumours: the increasing difficulties in meeting the newer and stricter safety and emission regulations, especially the new EU regulations on pedestrian protection; Mercedes-Benz had introduced new GL-Class as an intended successor; and military contracts fulfilled. An outcry among enthusiasts who admired the G-Class for its tremendous off-road potential along with its reputation and cachet showed that a market still existed for such a vehicle. On 11 November 2005, Dieter Zetsche, DaimlerChrysler Board of Management member and head of the Mercedes Car Group, announced that G-Class production would continue. At the Paris Motor Show in September 2006, Mercedes-Benz reiterated that the G-Class would continue to be manufactured through 2015 due to the strong worldwide demand by both civilian and military buyers. Daimler AG extended the manufacturing contract with Magna Steyr to continue producing the W463 until 2017.

In late 2017, the end of production of the first generation W463 was announced with the heavily reengineered and updated successor to be introduced in 2018 for the 2019 model year.

=== Updates (1990–2018) ===
==== 1994 update ====
The update was minor with the model designation revised to reflect the new nomenclature system and with an enlarged six-cylinder inline petrol engine for the G 320, replacing the G 300. The Italy-only 200 GE/G 200 and 230 GE/G 230 were dropped, marking the end for the G-Class with the four-cylinder inline engine until G 350 was reintroduced for Chinese market in 2020. After the 200 GE/G 200, 230 GE/G 230, and 300 GE/G 300 were dropped in 1994, manual transmission was dropped from the W463 for good. The steering wheel received the driver's side airbag.

==== 1997 update ====
The W463 received its mechanical update in 1997. The update included a new power-assisted folding mechanism for its convertible. The engine range was revised with six-cylinder engines shifting from inline to V-form for both petrol and diesel versions. The G 500 was reintroduced with a new V8 petrol engine. The W463 received dual airbags for the driver and the front passenger.

==== 2002 update ====
The external rear-view mirrors were revised with integrated turn signal repeaters and power-assisted mirror control, eliminating the separate turn signal indicators attached to the body. The front and rear turn signal indicators received a clear lens. The newly revised headlamps for both American and international markets were also given clear glass lenses. The interior was updated with more creature comforts and better control switches. In 2002, Mercedes-Benz officially launched the G-Class in the United States for the first time since its inception in 1979 with the G 500 and G 55 AMG.

==== 2005 update ====
Mercedes-Benz announced the new G55 AMG Kompressor model with a more powerful, supercharged 5.4L V8 engine (code 113.993, or M113K), replacing the naturally aspirated 5.0L V8 engine (113.982, or M113). The G 500 was renamed as G 550 for certain markets (not USA until 2009).

==== 2006 update ====
This minor update revised the engine range with a new 3.0-litre V6 diesel engine in the G 320 CDI, replacing both the G 270 CDI and G 400 CDI. The G 500 and G 55 AMG Kompressor continued unchanged. The G 320 with the petrol engine was dropped, marking the suspension of six-cylinder petrol engines until 2018. The G 55 AMG Kompressor remained as a five-door station wagon while the G 320 CDI and G 500 were offered in three body styles: two-door cabriolet and station wagons with three-door short and five-door long wheelbases.

==== 2007 update ====
Mercedes-Benz showcased a heavily revised 2007 model at the Paris Motor Show in September 2006 with emphasis on an updated interior, engine range, and new safety equipment.

For 2007, the G-Class received its first high-intensity discharge headlamps, reversing camera, and tire pressure monitoring system (the latter two are federally mandated safety equipment for the United States). 2007 G500's in the USA start to phase out the 722.6 5spd transmission, and instead start coming with the new 722.9 7spd transmission. The G55(K)'s still have the 722.6 5spd transmission. The G 500 could be fitted with the sports side exhaust pipes from the G 55 AMG for extra cost. The power output for the G 55 AMG was increased from 350 kW (469 hp) to 368 kW (493 hp).

The interior received a new instrument cluster with four chrome-trimmed round gauges from the C-Class and a new four-spoke multi-function steering wheel with options of full leather cover or combination of leather and wood. The centre console was updated with new control switches for the vehicle's functions and a new climate control panel along with new COMAND APS infotainment and navigation system. In conjunction with the reversing camera, COMAND APS displays the rear view and graph representation of distance and width, assisting the driver during reversing maneuvers. The new ARTICO upholstery colour, cognac, was added to black and grey interior colour options.

==== 2008 update ====
The 2008 update included a new radiator grille with three thicker horizontal fins, replacing the previous seven, thinner fins. The COMAND APS infotainment and navigation system was revised with many new or extended functions such as the LINGUATRONIC voice control system, a 12-speaker Harman Kardon Logic 7 surround sound stereo system, TV tuner and a special off-road menu for the G 320 CDI and G 500 model. Heated and ventilated front seats were also offered. It was also the last year for the G500 in the USA.

==== 2009 update ====
The 2009 G550 replaces the 2008 G500, and gets a new 5.5-litre V8 petrol engine with 285 kW (382 hp) [mated to the 722.9 7spd transmission], replacing the 5.0-litre 218 kW (292 hp) that was in the 2008 G500. The new engine will improve the acceleration for the new G550.

The 2009 and 2010 vehicles saw the absence of a trailer hitch making this the first model years since the vehicles inception where no native towing hardware was available on the vehicle.

For the 30th anniversary of production, Mercedes-Benz offered two special anniversary editions. One was the G 500/G 550, which featured a more opulent interior and exclusive designo leather upholstery along with special decals. The other was a new utility model, the G 280 CDI Edition 30 PUR, consisting of the W461 chassis with a 3.0-litre V6 turbodiesel engine (OM 642 DE LA red.) and the W463 four-wheel-drive system.

==== 2011 update ====
Last year for the G55(K) [with 722.6 5spd transmission], in the USA.

==== 2012 update ====
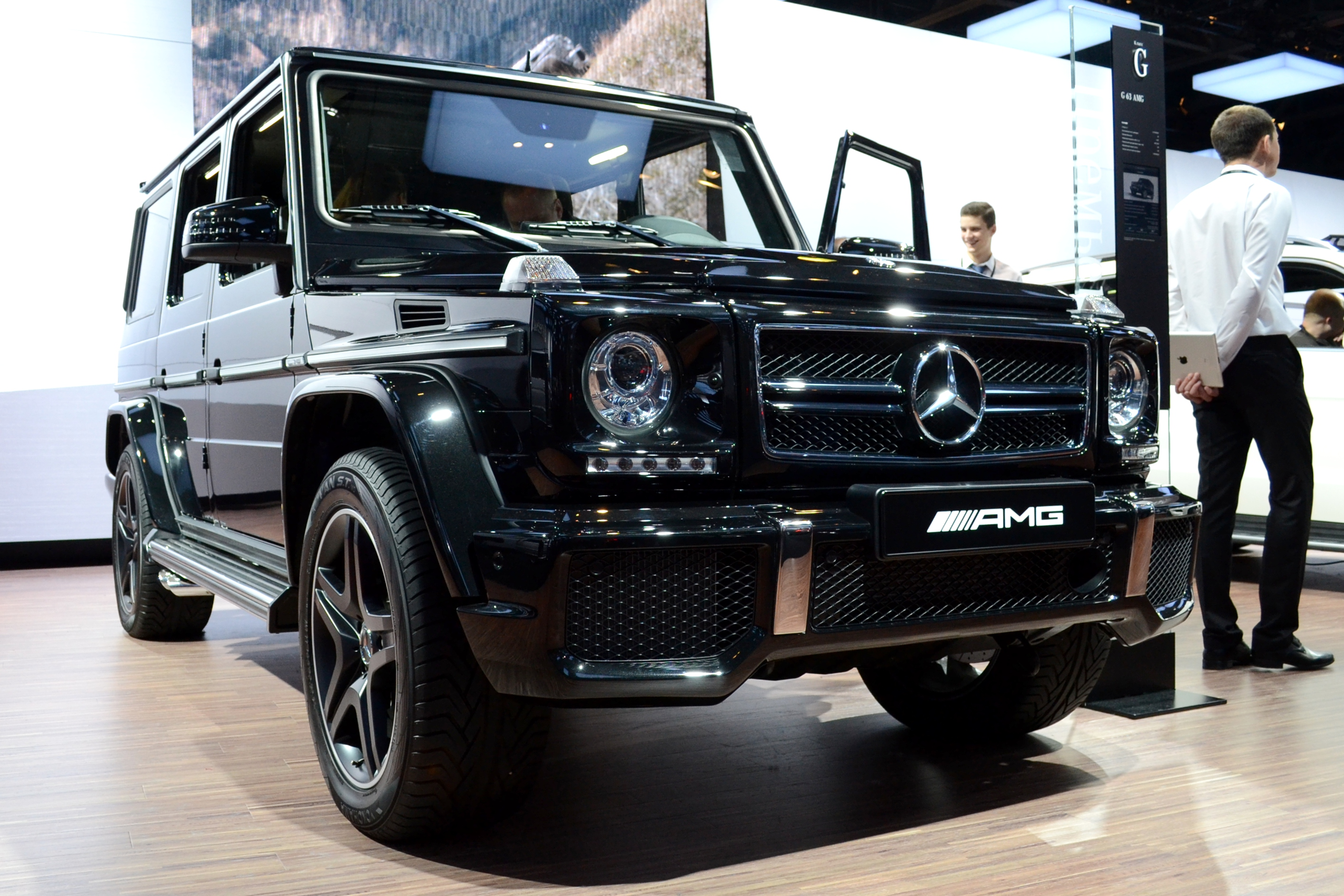
G 63 AMG with revised front end

After its last major update in 2007, the interior received a completely redesigned instrument panel and centre console adapted from the ML-Class. The COMAND APS touchscreen and control panel were moved up toward the top of the dashboard for easier viewing and operation. The COMAND APS was updated with the MBrace2 telematics system. Additional safety features included DISTRONIC adaptive cruise control, blind-spot monitoring, revised PARKTRONIC reverse sensors and rear-view camera and revised ATS4 stability control for improved trailer stabilising functionality.

Externally, the G-Class received the same horizontal bars of LED daytime running lamps underneath the headlamps and the new external side rear-view mirrors as the GL-Class and ML-Class models. The AMG version received a new front bumper with three large air intakes.

The 5.4-litre supercharged V8 [with 722.6 5spd transmission] in the 2011 G55(K) will be replaced by a new 5.5-litre biturbo V8 [with 722.9 7spd transmission] for increased performance on the upcoming 2013 G63. Topping out the G-Class model range was a new G 65 AMG with a 6-litre biturbo V12 petrol engine. Two models were carried over unchanged: the G 350 CDI BlueTEC and G 500/G 550.

==== 2016 update ====
For the 2016 model year, the outgoing M273 5.5-litre naturally aspirated V8 fitted to the G 500/G 550 was replaced by the new M176 4.0-litre biturbo V8 for increased horsepower and torque.

=== Technical data ===
==== Engines (1990–2018) ====
Notes: (m) and (a) denote "manual" and "automatic" transmissions where applicable. Fuel consumption marked with * denotes the older EEC regulation of "urban, 90 km/h, and 120 km/h" (U/90/120). Top speed with ** denotes the "electronically limited".

Model	Years	Configuration	Displacement	Power	Torque	0–100 km/h (0–62 mph)	Top speed	Fuel consumption/efficiency (EU-norm combined)
Petrol engines
200 GE (Italy)	1990–1994	I4 (M 102.965 E 20 KAT)	1,996 cc (121.8 cu in)	85 kW (116 PS; 114 hp) at 5,200 rpm Cat: 83 kW (113 PS; 111 hp)	172 N⋅m (127 lb⋅ft) at 3,500 rpm	20.8 seconds	144 km/h (89 mph)	15.6 L/100 km (15.1 mpg_{‑US})*; 11.1 L/100 km (21.2 mpg_{‑US})*; 15.7 L/100 km (15.0 mpg_{‑US})*
230 GE; G 230	1990–1995	I4 (M 102.989 E 23 KAT)	2,298 cc (140.2 cu in)	93 kW (126 PS; 125 hp) at 5,000 rpm	190 N⋅m (140 lb⋅ft) at 4,000 rpm	17.7 seconds (m)	145 km/h (90 mph) (m)	16.4 L/100 km (14.3 mpg_{‑US})* (m); 12.7 L/100 km (18.5 mpg_{‑US})*; 17.3 L/100 km (13.6 mpg_{‑US})*
230 GE; G 230	1990–1995	I4 (M 102.989 E 23 KAT)	2,298 cc (140.2 cu in)	93 kW (126 PS; 125 hp) at 5,000 rpm	190 N⋅m (140 lb⋅ft) at 4,000 rpm	18.4 seconds (a)	144 km/h (89 mph) (a)	15.1 L/100 km (15.6 mpg_{‑US})* (a); 13.1 L/100 km (18.0 mpg_{‑US})*; 18.0 L/100 km (13.1 mpg_{‑US})*
300 GE; G 300	1990–1994	I6 (M 103.987 E 30 KAT)	2,962 cc (180.8 cu in)	125 kW (170 PS; 168 hp) at 5,700 rpm	190 N⋅m (140 lb⋅ft) at 4,000 rpm	13.5 seconds (m)	164 km/h (102 mph) (m)	18.7 L/100 km (12.6 mpg_{‑US})* (m); 13.4 L/100 km (17.6 mpg_{‑US})*; 17.7 L/100 km (13.3 mpg_{‑US})*
300 GE; G 300	1990–1994	I6 (M 103.987 E 30 KAT)	2,962 cc (180.8 cu in)	125 kW (170 PS; 168 hp) at 5,700 rpm	190 N⋅m (140 lb⋅ft) at 4,000 rpm	14 seconds (a)	162 km/h (101 mph) (a)	18.2 L/100 km (12.9 mpg_{‑US})* (a); 14.2 L/100 km (16.6 mpg_{‑US})*; 19.2 L/100 km (12.3 mpg_{‑US})*
G 320	1994–1998	I6 (M 104.996 E 32)	3,199 cc (195.2 cu in)	155 kW (211 PS; 208 hp) at 5,500 rpm	300 N⋅m (221 lb⋅ft) at 3,750 rpm	12.1 seconds	175 km/h (109 mph)	16.6 L/100 km (14.2 mpg_{‑US})*; 14.0 L/100 km (16.8 mpg_{‑US})*; 18.4 L/100 km (12.8 mpg_{‑US})*
G 320	1997–2006	V6 (M 112.945 E 32)	3,199 cc (195.2 cu in)	160 kW (218 PS; 215 hp) at 5,600 rpm	300 N⋅m (221 lb⋅ft) at 2,800–4,800 rpm	10.9 seconds	175 km/h (109 mph)	15.5 L/100 km (15.2 mpg_{‑US})
G 36 AMG	1994–1995	I6 (M 104.992 E 36)	3,606 cc (220.1 cu in)	206 kW (280 PS; 276 hp) at 5,750 rpm	385 N⋅m (284 lb⋅ft) at 4,000 rpm	9.6 seconds	190 km/h (118 mph)	—
500 GE	1993–1994	V8 (M 117.965 E 50)	4,973 cc (303.5 cu in)	177 kW (241 PS; 237 hp) at 5,200 rpm	365 N⋅m (269 lb⋅ft) at 3,750 rpm	11.4 seconds	180 km/h (112 mph)	— 16.1 L/100 km (14.6 mpg_{‑US})*; 21.8 L/100 km (10.8 mpg_{‑US})*
500 GE 6.0 AMG	1993	V8 (M 117.965 E 50)	5,953 cc (363.3 cu in)	243 kW (330 PS; 326 hp) at 5,250 rpm	525 N⋅m (387 lb⋅ft) at 4,000 rpm	10.9 seconds	195 km/h (121 mph)	—
G 500	1998–2008	V8 (M 113.965 E 50)	4,966 cc (303.0 cu in)	218 kW (296 PS; 292 hp) at 5,500 rpm	456 N⋅m (336 lb⋅ft) at 2,800–4,000 rpm	9.7–10.2 seconds	190 km/h (118 mph)	16.7 L/100 km (14.1 mpg_{‑US})
G 500; G 550 (USA, 2005–2018)	2008–2015	V8 (M 273 KE 55)	5,461 cc (333.3 cu in)	285 kW (387 PS; 382 hp) at 6,000 rpm	530 N⋅m (391 lb⋅ft) at 2,800–4,800 rpm	5.9–6.1 seconds	210 km/h (130 mph)	14.9 L/100 km (15.8 mpg_{‑US})
G 500; G 550 (USA, 2005–2018)	2015–2018	V8 biturbo (M 176 DE 40 AL)	3,982 cc (243.0 cu in)	310 kW (421 PS; 416 hp)at 5,250–5,500 rpm	610 N⋅m (450 lb⋅ft) at 2,250–4,750 rpm	5.9 seconds	210 km/h (130 mph)	12.3 L/100 km (19.1 mpg_{‑US})
G 500 4×4²	2015–2018	V8 biturbo (M 176 DE 40 AL)	3,982 cc (243.0 cu in)	310 kW (421 PS; 416 hp)at 5,250–5,500 rpm	610 N⋅m (450 lb⋅ft) at 2,250–4,750 rpm	7.4 seconds	210 km/h (130 mph)	13.8 L/100 km (17.0 mpg_{‑US})
G 55 AMG	2001–2003	V8 (M 113 E 55)	5,439 cc (331.9 cu in)	260 kW (354 PS; 349 hp)} at 5,500 rpm	525 N⋅m (387 lb⋅ft) at 2,800–4,000 rpm	7.4 seconds	209 km/h (130 mph)	15.9 L/100 km (14.8 mpg_{‑US})
G 55 AMG	2004–2006	V8 supercharged (M 113 E 55 ML)	5,439 cc (331.9 cu in)	350 kW (476 PS; 469 hp) at 6,100 rpm	700 N⋅m (516 lb⋅ft) at 2,650–4,500 rpm	5.6 seconds	210 km/h (130 mph)	16.3 L/100 km (14.4 mpg_{‑US})
G 55 AMG	2006–2008	V8 supercharged (M 113 E 55 ML)	5,439 cc (331.9 cu in)	368 kW (500 PS; 493 hp) at 6,100 rpm	700 N⋅m (516 lb⋅ft) at 2,750–4,000 rpm	5.5 seconds	210 km/h (130 mph)	15.9 L/100 km (14.8 mpg_{‑US})
G 55 AMG	2008–2012	V8 supercharged (M 113 E 55 ML)	5,439 cc (331.9 cu in)	373 kW (507 PS; 500 hp) at 6,100 rpm	700 N⋅m (516 lb⋅ft) at 2,750–4,000 rpm	5.5 seconds	210 km/h (130 mph)	15.9 L/100 km (14.8 mpg_{‑US})
G 63 AMG (V8)	2012–2015	V8 biturbo (M 157 DE 55 AL)	5,461 cc (333.3 cu in)	400 kW (544 PS; 536 hp) at 5,500 rpm	800 N⋅m (590 lb⋅ft) at 1,700–5,000 rpm	5.4 seconds	210 km/h (130 mph)**	13.8 L/100 km (17.0 mpg_{‑US})
Mercedes-AMG; G 63	2015–2018	V8 biturbo (M 157 DE 55 AL)	5,461 cc (333.3 cu in)	420 kW (571 PS; 563 hp) at 5,500 rpm	800 N⋅m (590 lb⋅ft) at 1,700–5,000 rpm	5.4 seconds	210 km/h (130 mph)**	13.8 L/100 km (17.0 mpg_{‑US})
G 63 AMG (V12)	2002–2003	V12 (M 137 E 63)	6,258 cc (381.9 cu in)	326 kW (443 PS; 437 hp) at 5,500 rpm	620 N⋅m (457 lb⋅ft) at 4,400 rpm	6.5 seconds	210 km/h (130 mph)	—
G 63 AMG 6×6	2013–2015	V8 biturbo (M 157 DE 55 AL red.)	5,461 cc (333.3 cu in)	400 kW (544 PS; 536 hp) at 5,500 rpm	760 N⋅m (561 lb⋅ft) at 1,700–5,000 rpm	7.9 seconds	160 km/h (99 mph)	— — 15.6 L/100 km (15.1 mpg_{‑US})
G 65 AMG	2012–2015	V12 biturbo (M 279 E 60 AL)	5,980 cc (365 cu in)	450 kW (612 PS; 603 hp) at 4,300–5,600 rpm	1,000 N⋅m (738 lb⋅ft) at 2,300–4,300 rpm	5.3 seconds	230 km/h (143 mph)	17.0 L/100 km (13.8 mpg_{‑US})
Mercedes-AMG; G 65	2015–2018	V12 biturbo (M 279 E 60 AL)	5,980 cc (365 cu in)	463 kW (630 PS; 621 hp) at 4,800–5,400 rpm	1,000 N⋅m (738 lb⋅ft) at 2,300–4,300 rpm	5.3 seconds	230 km/h (143 mph)	17.0 L/100 km (13.8 mpg_{‑US})
Mercedes-Maybach G 650 Landaulet	2017-2018	V12 biturbo (M 279 E 60 AL)	5,980 cc (365 cu in)	463 kW (630 PS; 621 hp) at 4,800–5,400 rpm	1,000 N⋅m (738 lb⋅ft) at 2,300–4,300 rpm	6.0 seconds	180 km/h (112 mph)	—
Diesel engines
250 GD	1990–1992	I5 (OM 602.931 D 25)	2,497 cc (152.4 cu in)	69 kW (94 PS; 93 hp) at 4,600 rpm	158 N⋅m (117 lb⋅ft) at 2,600–3,100 rpm	28.1 seconds	132 km/h (82 mph)	13.5 L/100 km (17.4 mpg_{‑US})*; 10.5 L/100 km (22 mpg_{‑US})*; 15.2 L/100 km (15.5 mpg_{‑US})*
G 270 CDI	2002–2006	I5 turbo (OM 612.965 DE 27 LA)	2,685 cc (163.8 cu in)	115 kW (156 PS; 154 hp) at 4,200 rpm	400 N⋅m (295 lb⋅ft) at 1,800–2,600 rpm	13.2–13.7 seconds	160 km/h (99 mph)	12.8 L/100 km (18.4 mpg_{‑US}); 9.6 L/100 km (25 mpg_{‑US}); 10.9 L/100 km (21.6 mpg_{‑US})
300 GD; G 300 D	1990–1994	I6 (OM 603.931 D 30)	2,996 cc (182.8 cu in)	83 kW (113 PS; 111 hp) at 4,600 rpm	191 N⋅m (141 lb⋅ft) at 2,700–2,900 rpm	22.2 seconds (m)	141 km/h (88 mph) (m)	14.7 L/100 km (16.0 mpg_{‑US})* (m); 10.9 L/100 km (21.6 mpg_{‑US})*; 16.0 L/100 km (14.7 mpg_{‑US})*
300 GD; G 300 D	1990–1994	I6 (OM 603.931 D 30)	2,996 cc (182.8 cu in)	83 kW (113 PS; 111 hp) at 4,600 rpm	191 N⋅m (141 lb⋅ft) at 2,700–2,900 rpm	23.3–23.6 seconds (a)	138–141 km/h (86–88 mph) (a)	12.5 L/100 km (18.8 mpg_{‑US})* (a); 10.8 L/100 km (22 mpg_{‑US})*; 15.9 L/100 km (14.8 mpg_{‑US})*
G 300 D Turbodiesel	1996–2001	I6 turbo (OM 606.964 D 30 LA)	2,996 cc (182.8 cu in)	130 kW (177 PS; 174 hp) at 4,400 rpm	330 N⋅m (243 lb⋅ft) at 1,600–3,600 rpm	14.2 seconds (m)	164 km/h (102 mph)	14.6 L/100 km (16.1 mpg_{‑US}); 10.6 L/100 km (22 mpg_{‑US}); 12.1 L/100 km (19.4 mpg_{‑US})
G 320 CDI	2006–2009	V6 turbo (OM 642 DE 30 LA)	2,987 cc (182.3 cu in)	165 kW (224 PS; 221 hp) at 3,800 rpm	540 N⋅m (398 lb⋅ft) at 1,600–2,400 rpm	8.8–9.1 seconds	177 km/h (110 mph)	13.4 L/100 km (17.6 mpg_{‑US}); 9.7 L/100 km (24 mpg_{‑US}); 11.0 L/100 km (21.4 mpg_{‑US})
350 GD T G 350 Turbodiesel	1992–1996	I6 turbo (OM 603.972 D 35 A)	3,449 cc (210.5 cu in)	100 kW (136 PS; 134 hp) at 4,000 rpm	305 N⋅m (225 lb⋅ft) at 1,800 rpm	16 seconds	150 km/h (93 mph)	13.5 L/100 km (17.4 mpg_{‑US}); 11.8 L/100 km (19.9 mpg_{‑US}); 16.9 L/100 km (13.9 mpg_{‑US})
G 350 CDI	2009-2010	V6 turbo (OM 642 DE 30 LA)	2,987 cc (182.3 cu in)	165 kW (224 PS; 221 hp) at 3,800 rpm	540 N⋅m (398 lb⋅ft) at 1,600–2,400 rpm	8.8–9.1 seconds	177 km/h (110 mph)	16.1 L/100 km (14.6 mpg_{‑US}); 11.0 L/100 km (21.4 mpg_{‑US}); 12.8 L/100 km (18.4 mpg_{‑US})
G 350 CDI BlueTEC	2010-2015	V6 turbo (OM 642 DE 30 LA)	2,987 cc (182.3 cu in)	155 kW (211 PS; 208 hp) at 3,400 rpm	540 N⋅m (398 lb⋅ft) at 1,600–2,400 rpm	8.8–9.1 seconds	175 km/h (109 mph)	13.6 L/100 km (17.3 mpg_{‑US}); 9.8 L/100 km (24 mpg_{‑US}); 11.2 L/100 km (21.0 mpg_{‑US})
G 350 d	2015–2018	V6 turbo (OM 642 LS DE 30 LA)	2,987 cc (182.3 cu in)	180 kW (245 PS; 241 hp) at 3,600 rpm	600 N⋅m (443 lb⋅ft) at 1,600–2,400 rpm	8.8 seconds	192 km/h (119 mph)	11.1 L/100 km (21.2 mpg_{‑US}); 9.1 L/100 km (26 mpg_{‑US}); 9.9 L/100 km (24 mpg_{‑US})
G 350 d Professional	2016-2018	V6 turbo (OM 642 LS DE 30 LA)	2,987 cc (182.3 cu in)	180 kW (245 PS; 241 hp) at 3,600 rpm	600 N⋅m (443 lb⋅ft) at 1,600–2,400 rpm	8.8 seconds	160 km/h (99 mph)	11.1 L/100 km (21.2 mpg_{‑US}); 9.1 L/100 km (26 mpg_{‑US}); 9.9 L/100 km (24 mpg_{‑US})
G 400 CDI	2001-2006	V8 biturbo (OM 628.962 DE 40 LA)	3,996 cc (243.9 cu in)	184 kW (250 PS; 247 hp) at 4,000 rpm	560 N⋅m (413 lb⋅ft) at 1,700–2,600 rpm	9.9–10.3 seconds	182 km/h (113 mph)	16.1 L/100 km (14.6 mpg_{‑US}); 11.0 L/100 km (21.4 mpg_{‑US}); 12.8 L/100 km (18.4 mpg_{‑US})

== W463, second generation (2018–2024) ==
Mercedes-Benz G-Class (W463)
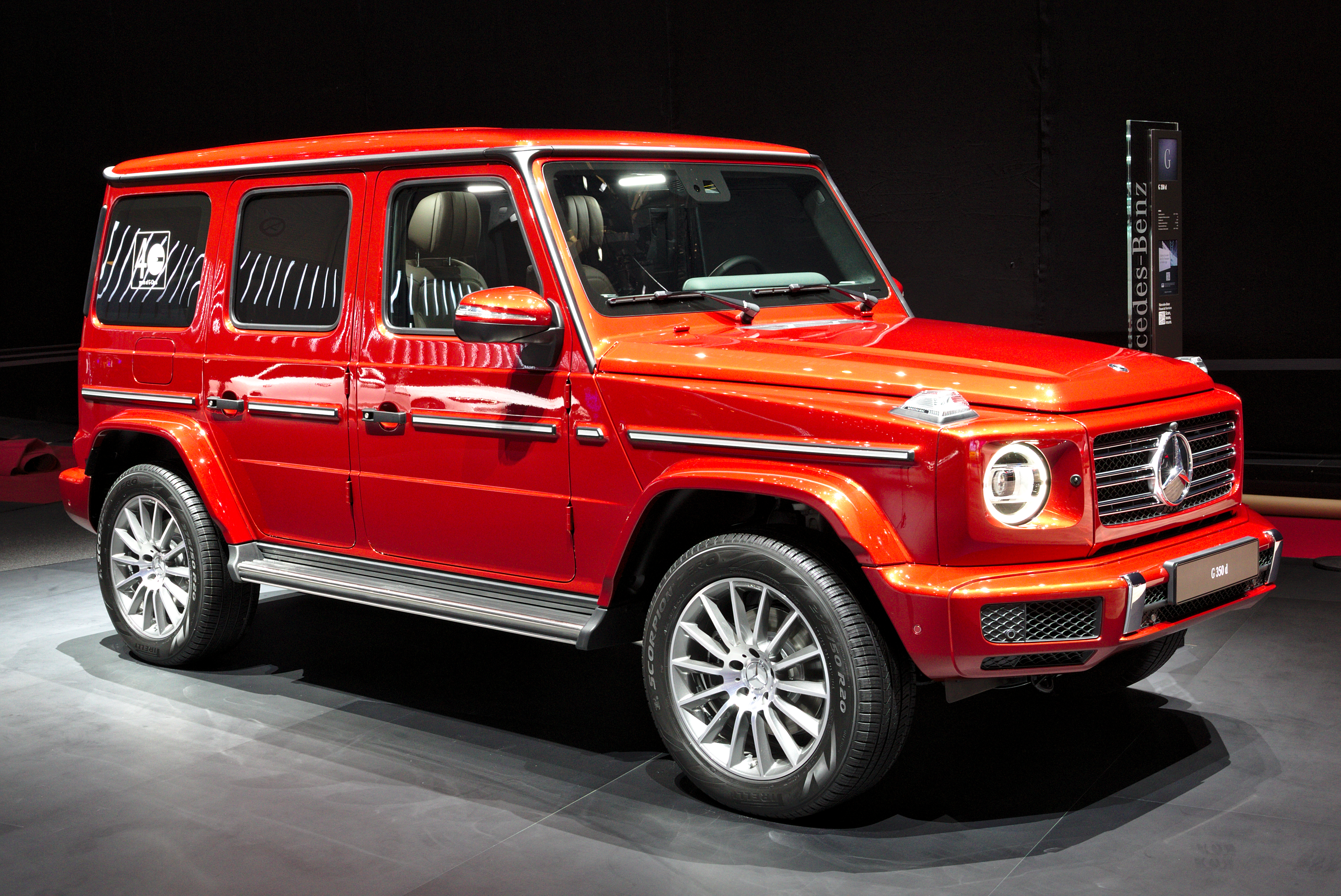

Overview
- Production: May 2018–March 2024
- Model years: 2019–2024
- Assembly: Austria: Graz (Magna Steyr)
- Designer: Balázs Filczer

Body and chassis
- Class: Mid-size luxury SUV
- Body style: 5-door SUV
- Layout: F4 (4MATIC)

Powertrain
- Engine: Petrol: 2.0 L M264 turbo I4; 3.0 L M256 turbo I6; 4.0 L M176 twin-turbo V8; 4.0 L M177 twin-turbo V8; Diesel: 2.9 L OM656 D29T R SCR turbo I6
- Transmission: 9-speed 9G-Tronic AMG SpeedShift TCT automatic

Dimensions
- Wheelbase: 2,890 mm (113.8 in)
- Length: 4,725–4,817 mm (186.0–189.6 in)
- Width: 1,931 mm (76.0 in)
- Height: 1,969 mm (77.5 in)
- Curb weight: 2,354–2,485 kg (5,190–5,478 lb)

Chronology
- Predecessor: W463 1
- Successor: W465

The second generation G-Class (W463) was launched on 14 January 2018 at the North American International Auto Show in Detroit.

Compared to its predecessor, the new G-Class has grown 121 millimeters in width, 53 millimeters in length, and the ground clearance has increased by 6 millimeters. The increase in width is for more driving stability, sturdier side impact protection, and more seating comfort. The increased length, especially in the front end, is due to the new 2019 EU pedestrian impact safety regulations: the previous generation did not have enough open space between the car's front end and the rigid components beneath for the crumple zone as to mitigate the injury to a pedestrian's body.

A major change was with the steering system which was switched from a recirculating ball system to variable-ratio rack-and-pinion with adaptive electric power assistance. The new steering system allows safety and convenience equipment such as active lane-keeping assist, Pre-Safe collision avoidance systems and self-parking capability. The rack-and-pinion steering system does not work with solid front suspension so a change was made to use independent front suspension.

The extensive, ground-up redesign allowed engineers to incorporate more lightweight materials such as high-strength and ultra-high-strength steels and aluminums. In addition, the redesign led to an improved manufacturing process which increased structural rigidity. The gap between the doors and body shell is much narrower than the previous generation. Despite the increased dimensions, the weight has been reduced by about 170 kilograms.

The second generation W463 is similar visually to the first generation, and the chassis code, W463, is still retained rather than W464 as some media outlets erroneously reported. However, only three parts from the previous generation were carried over to the new generation: the headlamp washers, the push-button door handles and the spare wheel cover bolted to the rear tailgate.

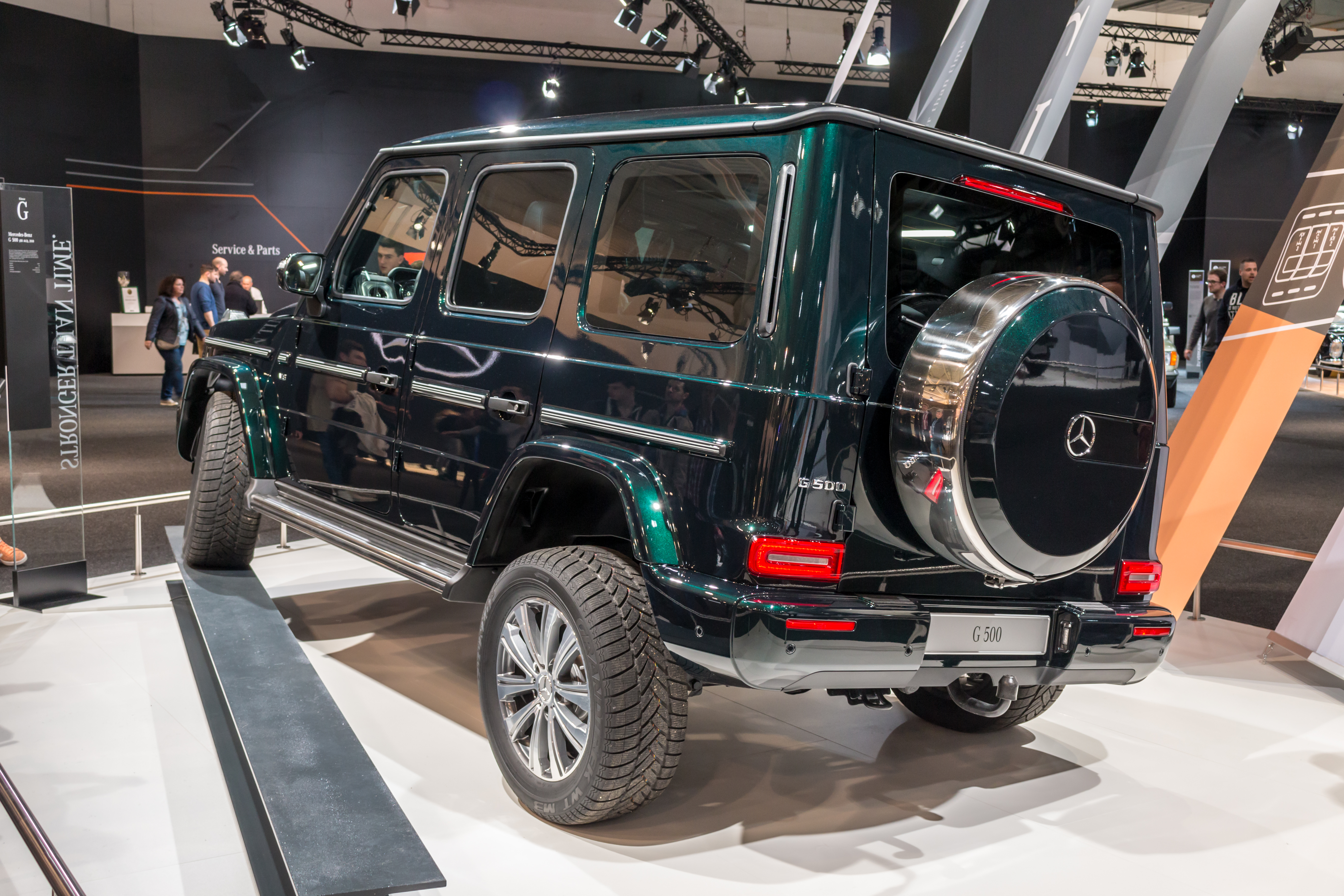
G 500 at the 2018 Essen Motor Show

The new G 500 (G 550 for select markets) is powered by the 4.0-liter M176 V8 twin-turbo engine, producing 416 hp and 450 lb⋅ft of torque. It is mated to a nine-speed automatic 9G-Tronic transmission with torque-converter.

For the new diesel variant, the G 350 d was initially released for the 2019 model year, powered by the 2.9-liter OM656 inline-6 turbocharged diesel engine, producing 282 hp and 443 lb⋅ft of torque. The G 400 d was later introduced for the 2020 model year onwards. The G 400 d features the same OM656 engine as the G 350 d, but output has been increased to 326 hp and 516 lb⋅ft of torque. Both models are still produced by Mercedes-Benz, however certain markets only sell one of the two.

The redesign also allowed newer safety and collision avoidance equipment from the W222 S-Class to be fitted to the G-Class for the first time. In addition, the updated interior has a new instrument cluster and infotainment system from other Mercedes-Benz models (A-Class (W177) and E-Class (W213)), air vents, steering column-mounted gear selector, multimedia system and control panel on the tunnel console, a higher level of luxury trimming and 64-color ambient lighting. A Burmester surround sound system and a larger dual 12-inch liquid-crystal display with smartphone integration (Apple CarPlay and Android Auto) were offered as optional equipment. One design element carried over to the new generation was the front passenger's grab bar on the dashboard.

The new G 550 and AMG G 63 went on sale in the United States with a starting price of $149,900 and $188,050 respectively. The G-Class for the US market has the widest range of exterior colors available, totaling 24, of any Mercedes-Benz passenger vehicle.

In September 2020, the G 350 was introduced for the Chinese market to circumvent the heavy taxation on larger engine displacement. It is powered by the 2-litre M264 turbocharged four-cylinder inline petrol engine, producing 255 hp (190 kW) and 273 lb⋅ft (370 N⋅m) of torque. The G 350 is the first G-Class with a four-cylinder inline engine since the previous model, the G 230, was discontinued in 1995.

=== Alternative designation: W463A/W464 ===
Mercedes-Benz has not explained the reason for retaining the same chassis designation, W463, for its heavily revised G-Class in production since 2018. Some media outlets have erroneously attributed the updated G-Class as W464, which has been assigned to the W461 successor introduced in October 2022.

Some media outlets, owner's forums, tuners, and aftermarket part manufacturers designate the G-Class in production from 2018 to 2022 as W463A as to avoid the confusion between the original W463 (1990–2018) and revised W463. None of the official Mercedes-Benz websites and product information around the world shows W463A.

=== Safety ratings ===
The second generation W463 is the first G-variant to ever be formally crash tested. No model prior to this has been certified or had its safety equipment tested for crash safety. EURONCAP testing showed overall positive results, with a 90% rating for adult occupants, 83% for child occupants and a 73% rating for pedestrians. The results showed good protection for the head and neck but were let down by disappointing protection for the chest in both frontal impacts.

EURONCAP Assessment Details (Tested 2019)
Frontal Offset - Simulates impact with a vehicle of similar weight
6.4 / 8.0 points	Head	Neck	Chest	Legs
Driver	Good	Good	Weak	Adequate - Good
Passenger	Good	Good	Adequate	Adequate - Good
Frontal Full-width - Simulates impact with a wall
6.6 / 8.0 points	Head	Neck	Chest	Legs
Driver	Good	Good	Marginal	Good
Passenger	Good	Adequate	Weak	Good
Whiplash - Neck protection from rear impact
1.5 / 2.0 points	Whiplash protection			
Front Seats	Good			
Rear Seats	Marginal			
Side Impact - Simulates side impact with vehicle or pole
16.0 / 16.0 points	Protection from side impacts			
Impact from car	Good			
Impact with pole	Good			

=== Mercedes-AMG models ===
==== G 63 ====
Alongside the new G 500/G 550, Mercedes-AMG unveiled the new G 63 in March 2018 at the Geneva International Motor Show. The model is powered by the V8 twin-turbo M177 engine, producing 577 hp (430 kW) and 627 lb⋅ft (850 N⋅m) of torque, an increase of 14 hp (10 kW) and 66 lb⋅ft (89 N⋅m) over the previous generation G 63 AMG. Mercedes-AMG claims a 0-60 mph time of 4.4 seconds and a top speed of 149 mph with the optional Driver's Package. The G 63 now defaults to a rear-biased 40:60 torque split versus the 50:50 split of its predecessor.

In addition to the performance increases over the G 500/G 550, the G 63 also features AMG-developed suspension, larger red brake calipers and perforated brake discs, AMG-specific transmission modes, radiator grille, flared wheel arches, striking side pipes on the exhaust system, and wider wheels up to 22-inches in diameter. The model features distinct front and rear fascias and body styling, as well as an AMG-specific interior with a standard AMG Performance steering wheel with flattened bottom.

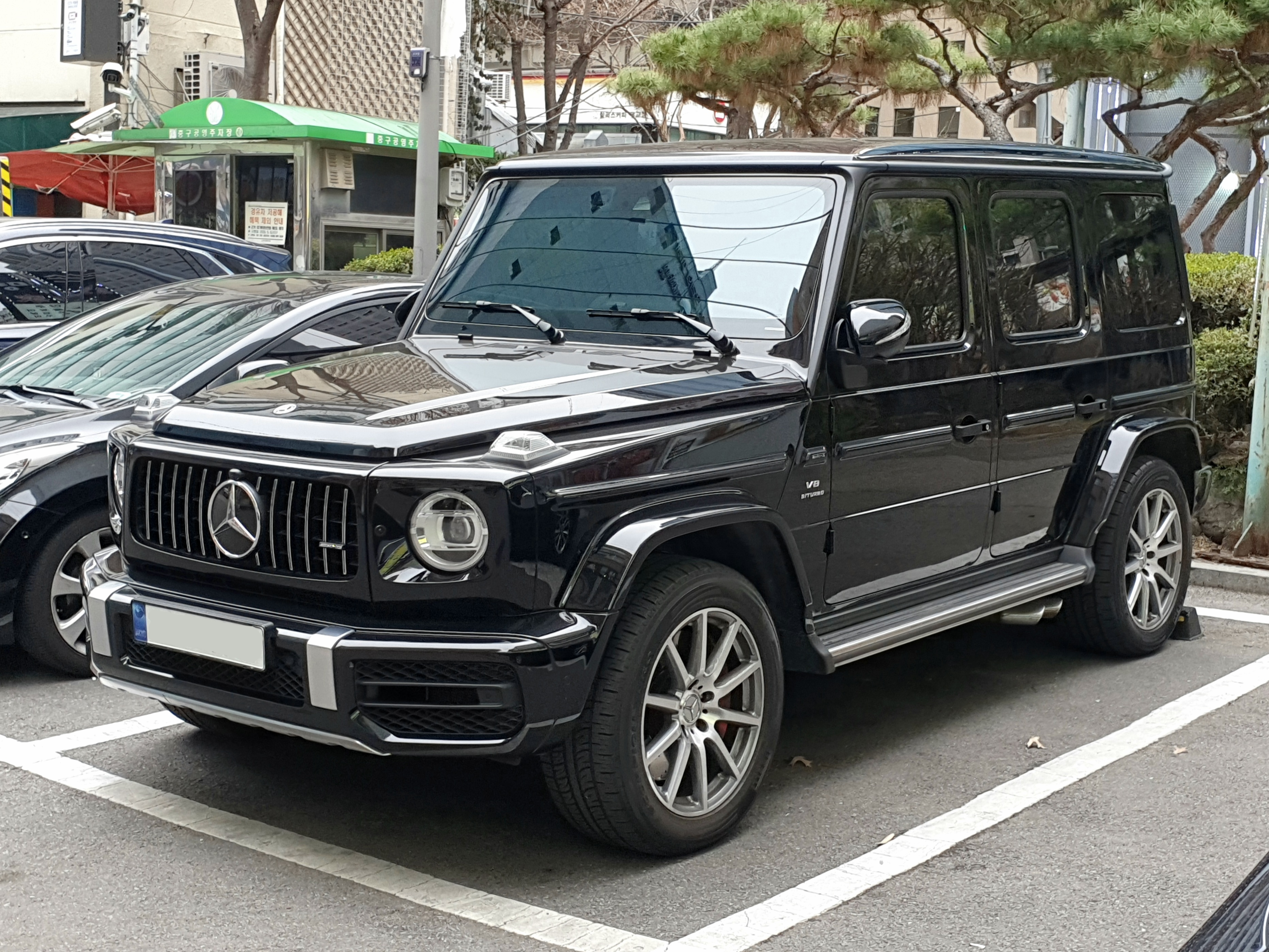
G 63

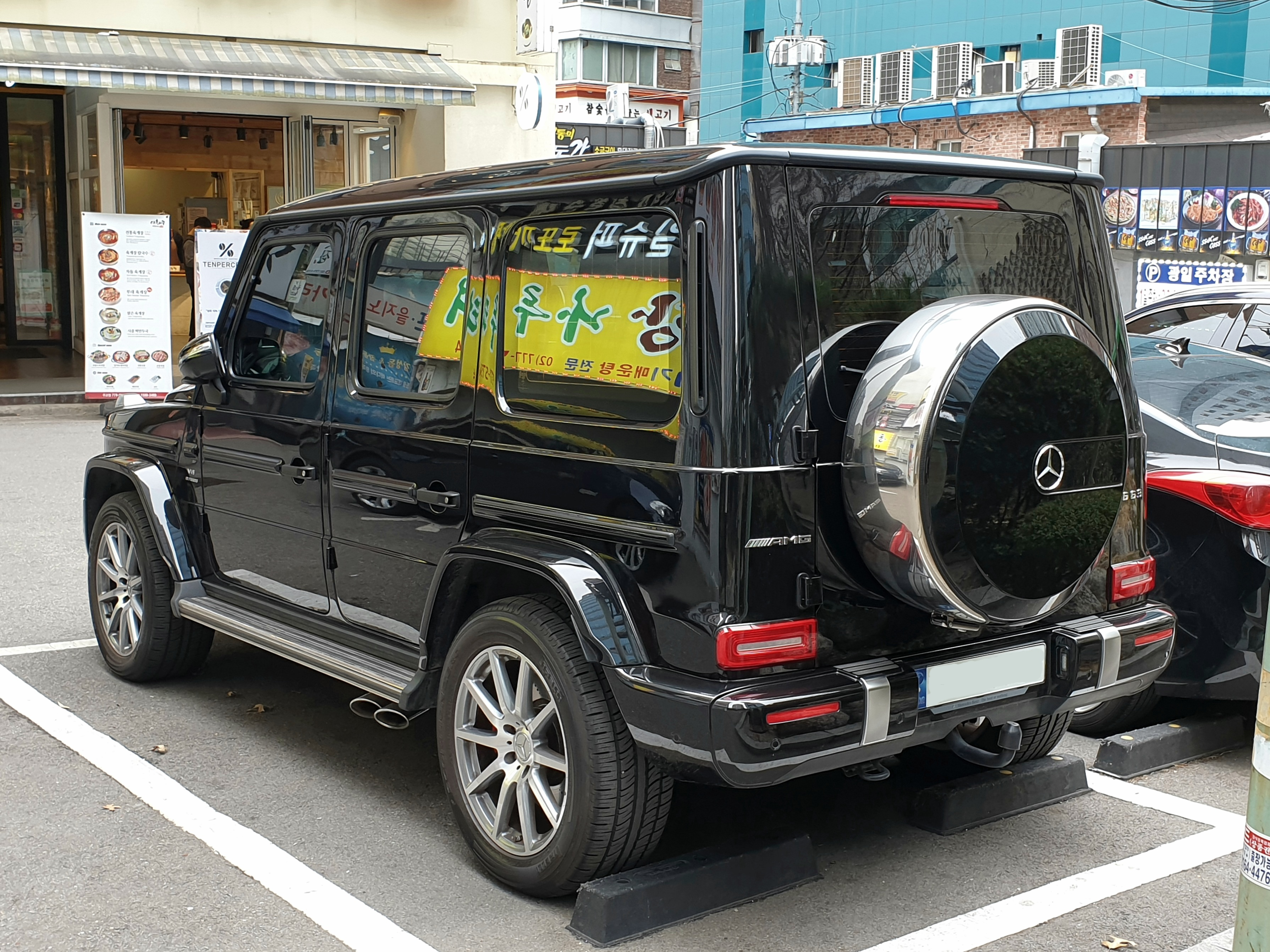
G 63 (rear)

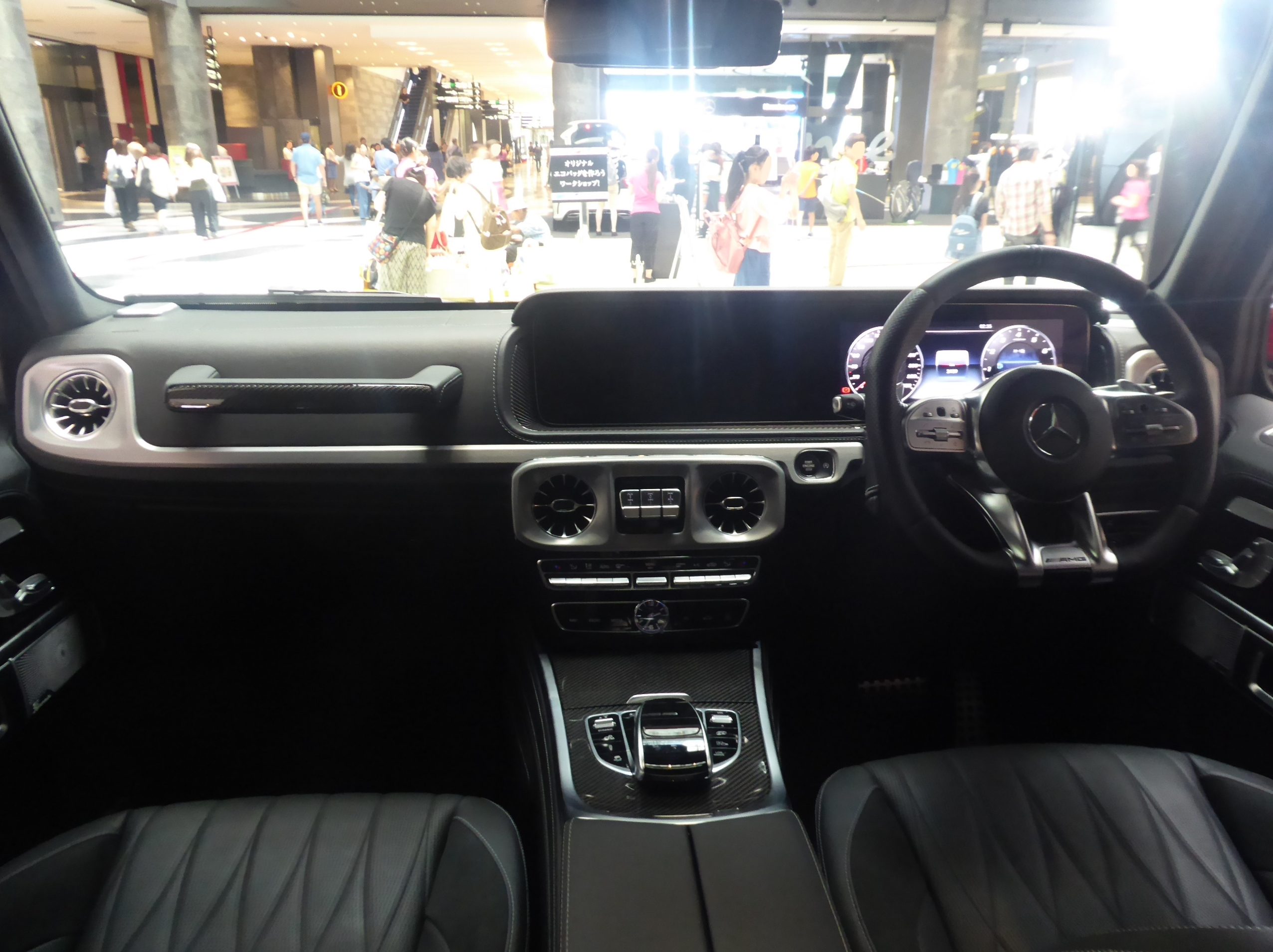
G 63 (Japan-market interior)

===== G 63 Edition 1 =====
To commemorate the launch of the second-generation G 63 in 2018, Mercedes-AMG released the Edition 1 special edition at market launch. The special model features Designo Night Black Magno paint with contrasting matte Graphite Grey sports stripes along the vehicle sides, a decorative red stripe on the exterior mirrors, and Night Package featuring gloss black trim and accents. The Edition 1 also features matte black 22-inch forged wheels with red-painted rim flanges and a cross-spoke design, as well as red accents throughout the interior.

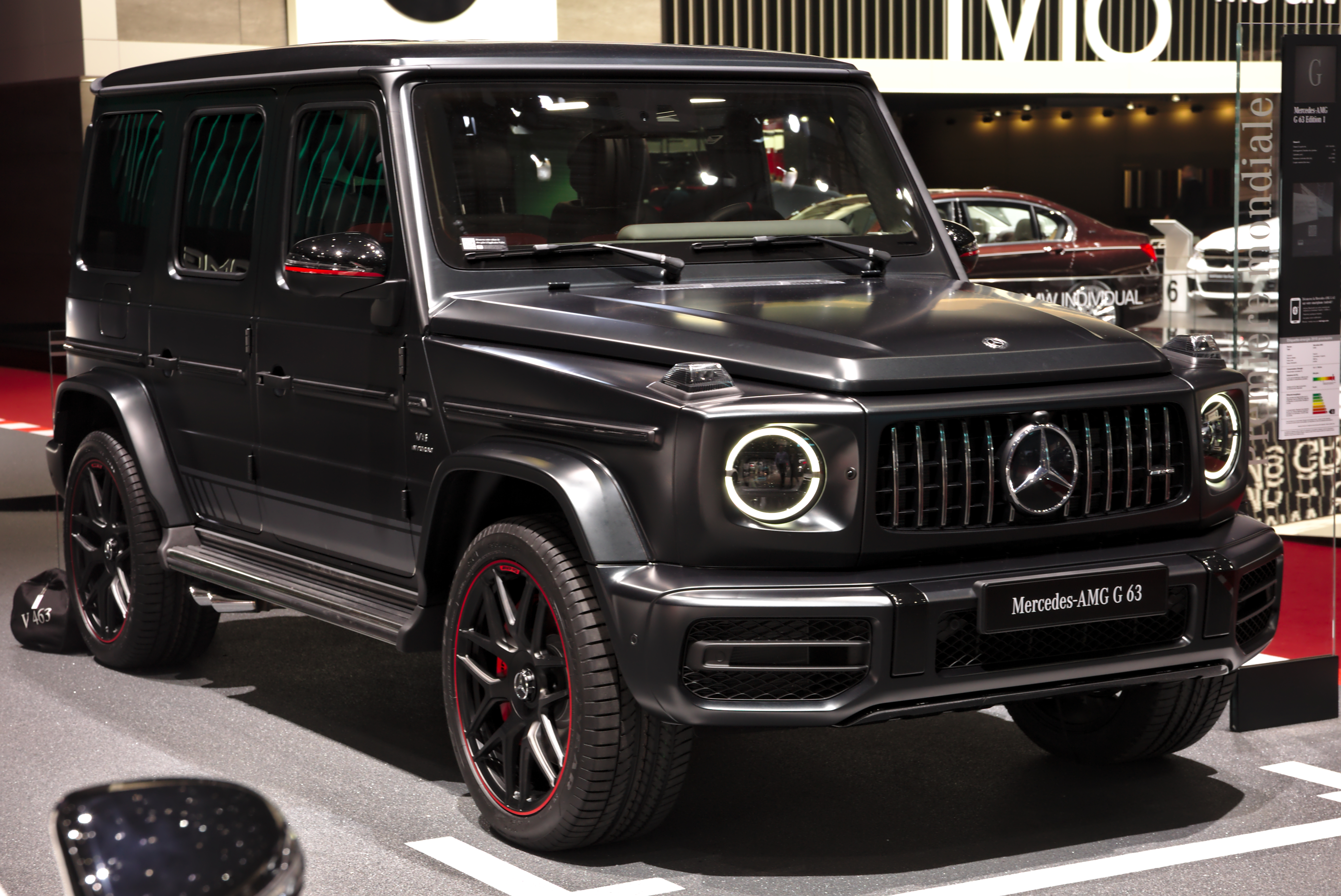
G 63 Edition 1 at the 2018 Geneva Motor Show

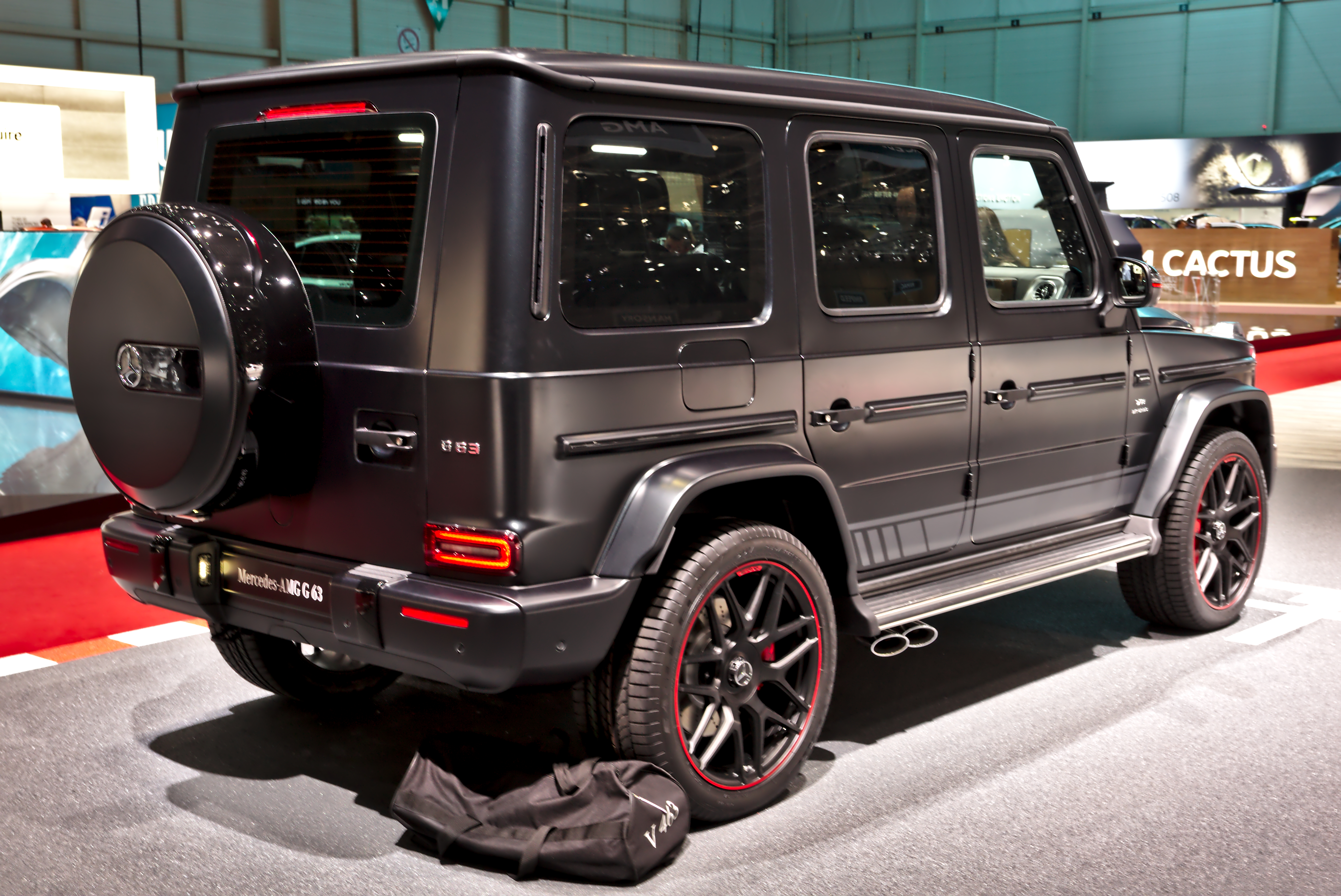
G 63 Edition 1 rear

===== G 63 Trail Package =====
The optional AMG Trail Package can be specified for the G 63 model only, offering greater off-road capability and styling. The package adds softer settings for the adaptive dampers to enhance off-road driving and maneuverability. 20-inch wheels with five sets of twin spokes and all-terrain tires are part of the package. A black skid plate and mud flaps behind the rear wheels are fitted to the body.

==== G 63 4x4² ====
Following the previous generation's G 63 AMG 6x6 and G 500/G 550 4x4², Mercedes-AMG introduced the new G 63 4x4² for the second generation iteration in June 2022. The G 63 4x4² features the same M177 V8 twin-turbo as the G 63 but with output increased to 585 hp from 577 hp, and raised portal axles like the previous generation G 500/G 550 4x4², except now with independent front axles. The model went on sale Fall 2022 for the 2023 model year with a starting price of $350,050 USD.

Compared to the G 63, the G 63 4x4² features a raised height, larger carbon-fiber fenders, 22-inch wheels with 37-inch Pirelli 325/55R22 all-terrain tires, LED light bar, roof rack with carbon-fiber windscreen, carbon-fiber spare tire cover, and rugged styling. With this increase in height, the model offers a ground clearance 4.3 inches over stock at 13.8 inches, wading depth 8.2 inches over stock at 35.8 inches, and 41.3° approach and 36.8° departure angles.

Additionally, compared to the previous generation G 500/G 550 4x4², the wheelbase is increased by 0.9 inch to 113.1 inches, height is increased by 0.8 inch to 88.8 inches, width is increased by 5.4 inches to 82.5 inches, and length is increased by 3.9 inches to 181.1 inches, or 194.5 inches when accounting for the spare tire carrier. Weight is decreased by 379 lbs to 6,315 lbs. Mercedes-Benz claims an estimated 5.0 0-60 mph time.

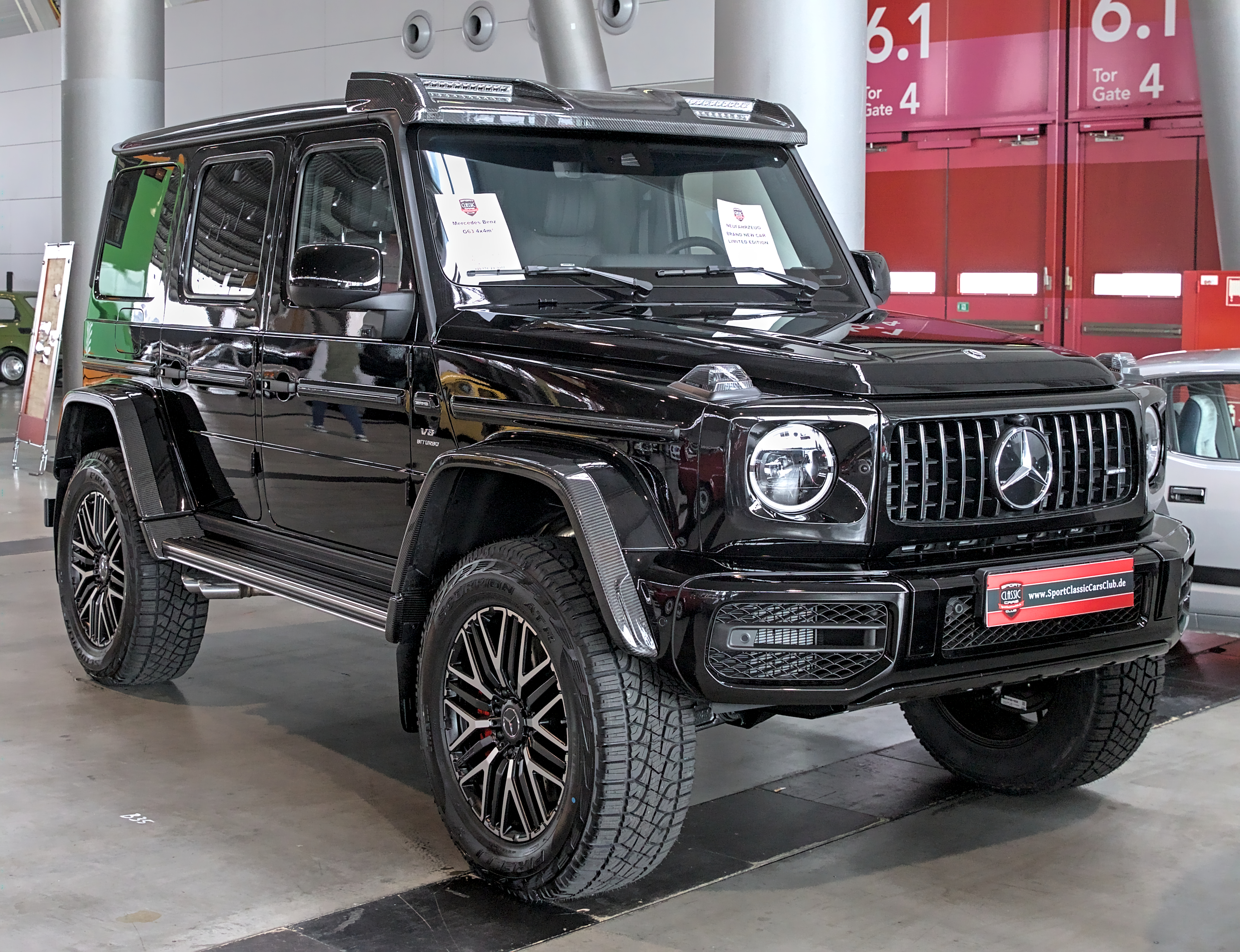
G 63 4x4² at Retro Classics 2023

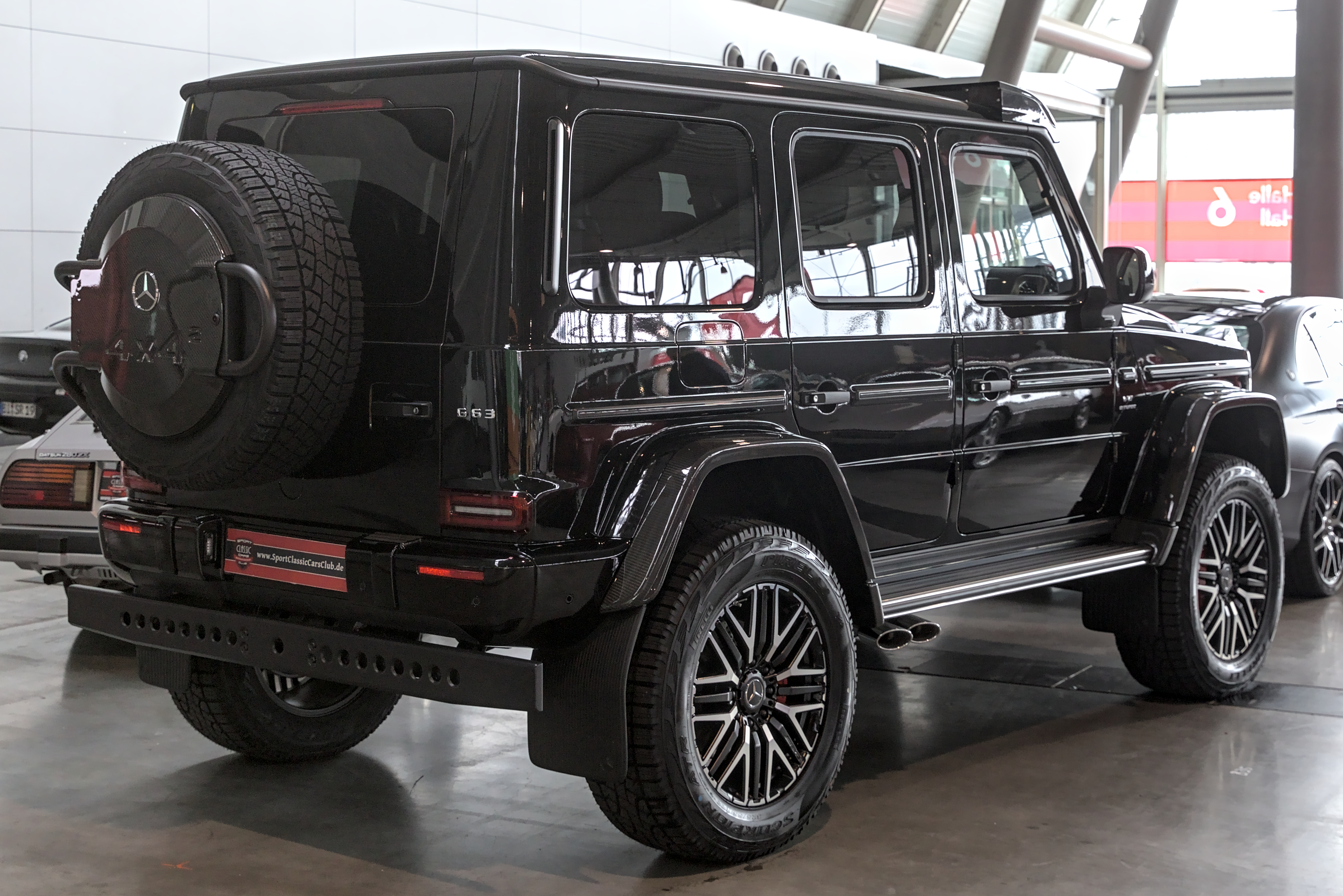
G 63 4x4² rear

=== Special models ===
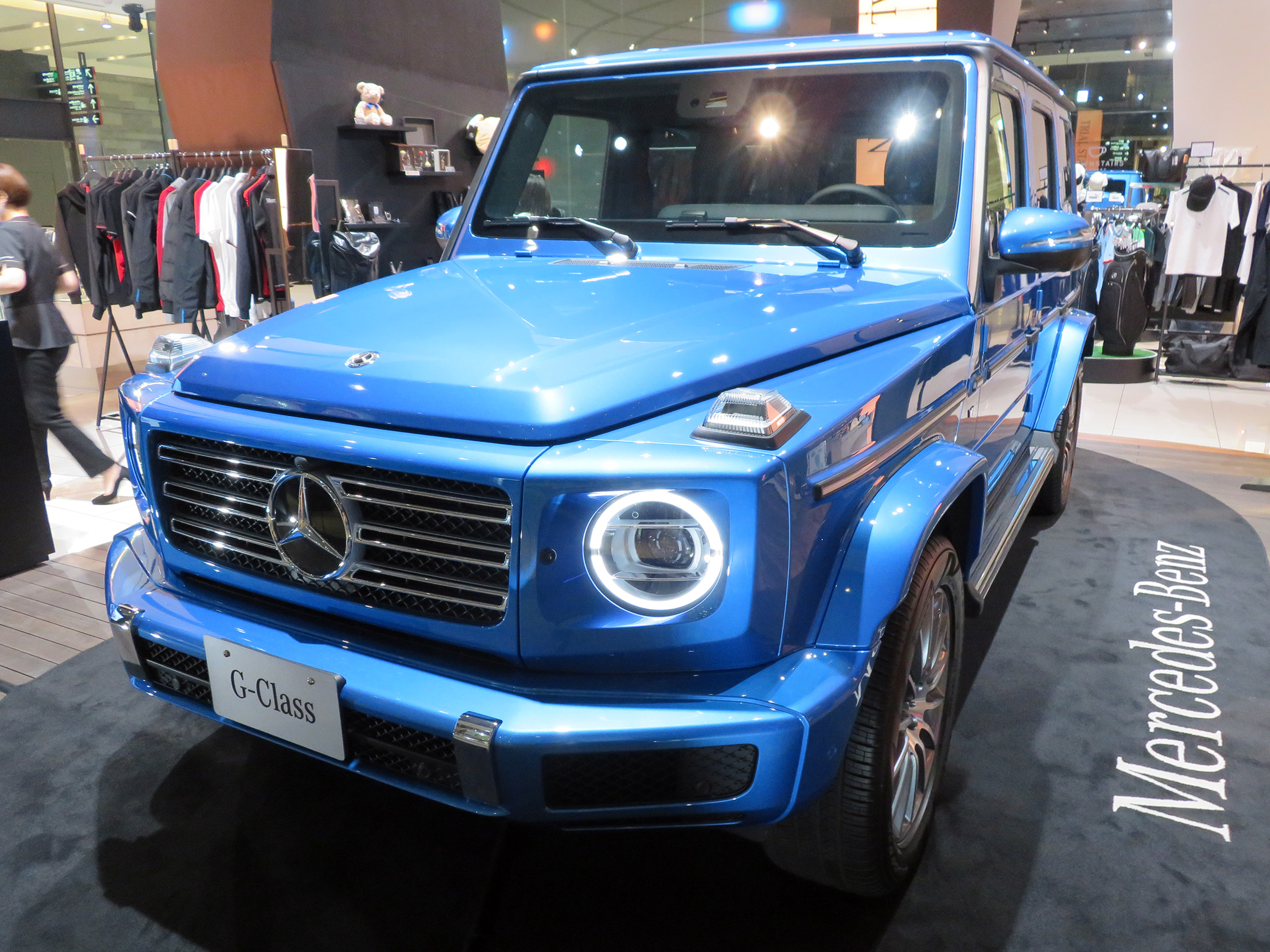
Mercedes-Benz G 550 in G manufaktur trim, front view

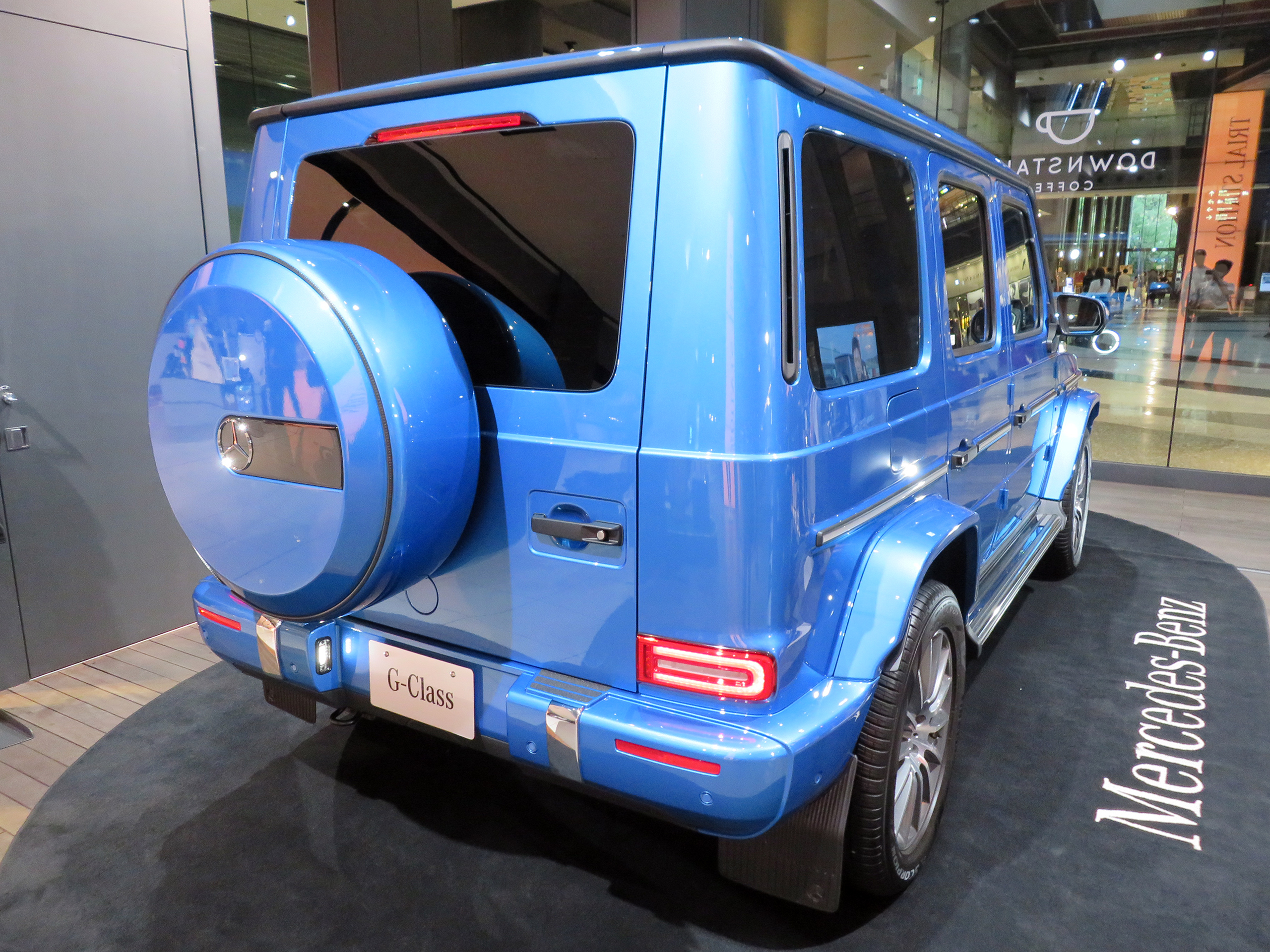
Mercedes-Benz G 550 G manufaktur trim, rear view

==== G manufaktur (Individualisation Programme) ====
Mercedes-Benz has introduced the bespoke/individualisation programme exclusive for the G-Class: G manufaktur. Similar to the Mercedes-Benz designo programme, buyers can specify different colour and material options. For the exterior, buyers can choose from 26 exclusive G manufaktur paint colours, and the Black Accents covers for the fender flares, roof, front and rear bumpers, external rear-view mirrors, rub stripes, spare wheel cover ring, wheels, side exhaust pipe tips, etc. in gloss black paint. For the interior, 64 different seat colour combinations and three patterns can be specified. The dashboard and steering wheel cover can be ordered with a two-toned colour combination. On the passenger grab bar, the G manufaktur brand is etched on the stainless steel trim.

==== Stronger Than Time ====
To celebrate the 40th anniversary of the G-Class and the 20th anniversary of the G 55 AMG, Mercedes-Benz introduced the Stronger Than Time edition for the G 400 d, G 500, and Mercedes-AMG G 63. For the G 400 d and G 500, the edition is fitted with the AMG Line exterior package, black 20-inch AMG wheels, and stainless steel trim for the running boards, spare wheel cover, and door sills. The puddle lamps display the G-Class logo and Stronger Than Time on the ground. The driver's assistance package, LED headlamps, Burmester surround stereo system, and sunroof are added as standard equipment. The G 63 has a dark chrome grille and matte chrome covering the running boards, exhaust outlets, mirror caps, portions of the front and rear bumper, skid plate, and sections of the spare wheel cover. The 22-inch matte black AMG wheels are fitted to the G 63.

Three interior designs can be chosen: black Nappa leather with gold stitching and open-pore black ash wood trim; a mix of Macchiato Beige and Yacht Blue leather with light brown sen wood trim; and Macchiato Beige and Lounge Red with piano black lacquer. The Nappa leather trim covers the roof grab handles and the instrument cluster cover. The two-tone black and Titanium Grey Pearl Nappa leather with carbon fiber trim is exclusive to the G 63 model.

==== Professional Line ====
With the success of Worker, Pur, and Professional variants in the previous W461 generation, Mercedes-Benz introduced the new Professional Line Exterior at the IAA Mobility 2021 in Munich. Professional Line Exterior is an exterior accessory options that the owners can customise their G-Class vehicles. The options include climbing ladder, roof rack, simpler spare wheel holder, black trims, headlamp protection grille shield, and like. Unlike the previous Worker, Pur, and Professional variants, Professional Line Exterior isn't a stripped-down utilitarian version of G-Class and based on W461 chassis.

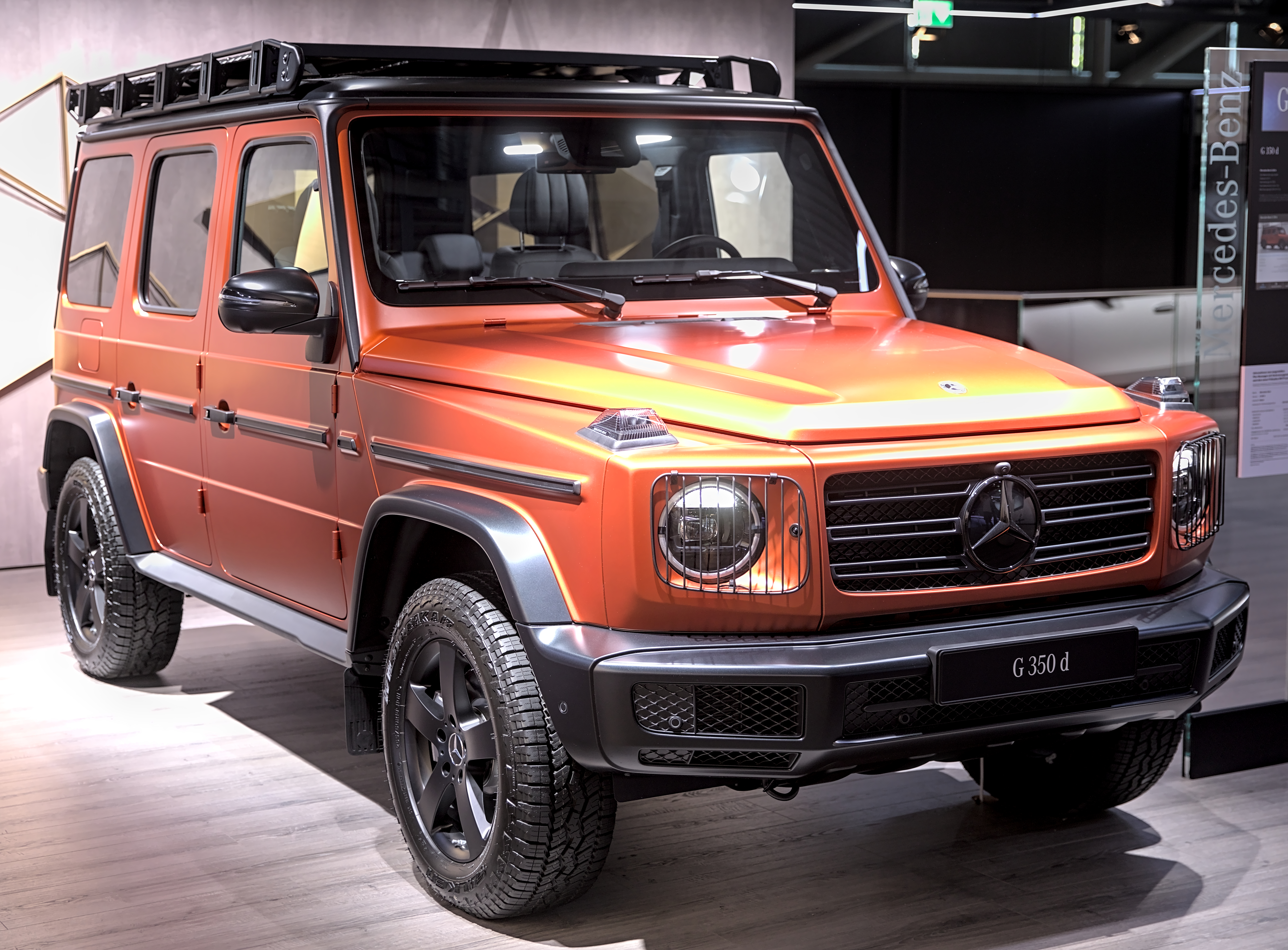
Professional Line at IAA 2021

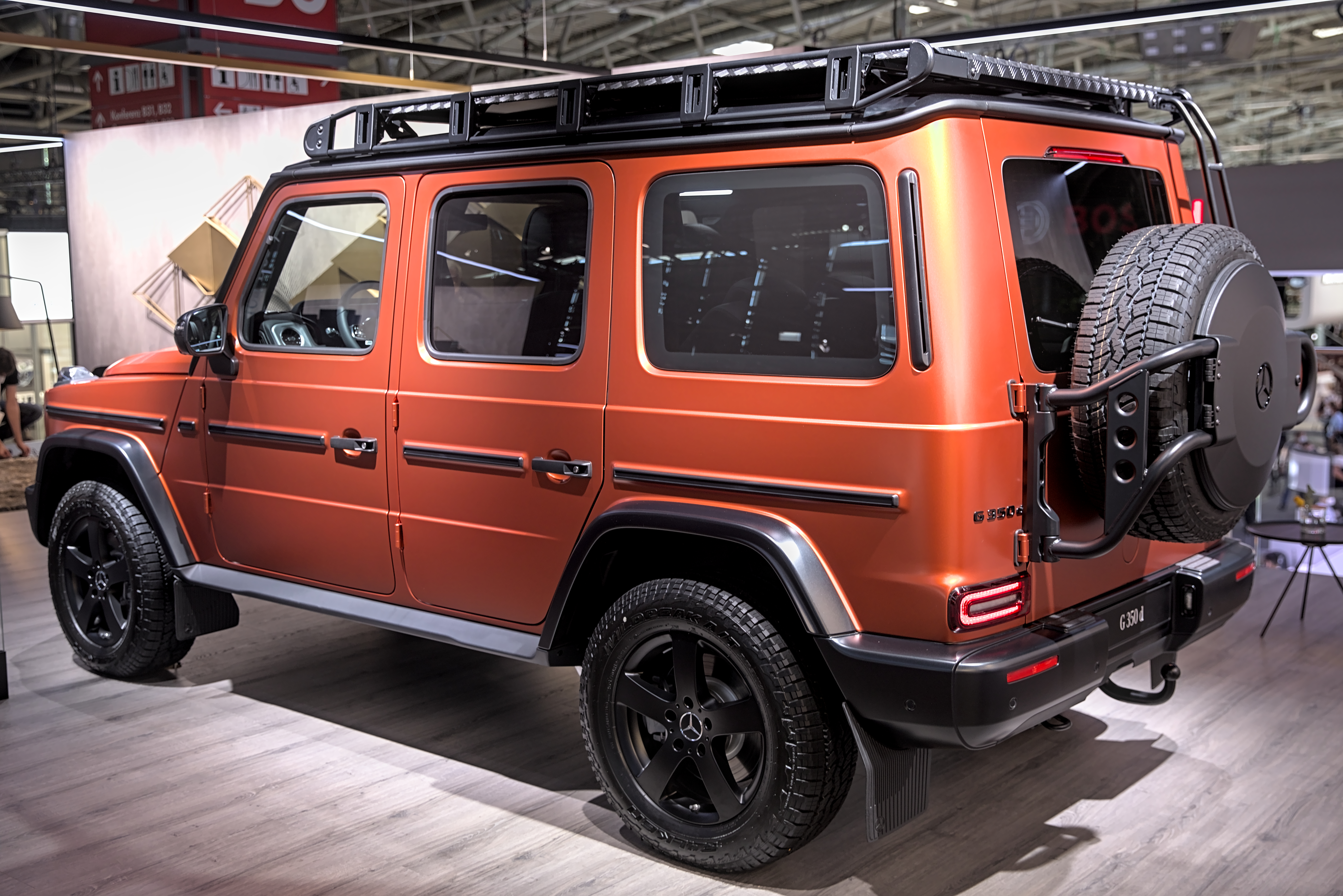
Professional Line rear

==== Final Edition G 500 V8 (2023) ====
On the 30th anniversary of the first G-Class to be equipped with a V8, the limited production 500 GE V8, Mercedes-Benz made a surprise announcement on 27 June 2023 that the production of the G 500 (G 550 in selected markets) with a V8 engine will end in 2023. The Final Edition G 500 V8 marks the end of the G 500 with a V8 engine from Mercedes-Benz. The high-performance Mercedes-AMG G 63 with a more powerful V8 engine will continue for the foreseeable future.

Production of the Final Edition G 500 V8 is limited to 1,500 units. Three paint colours are offered: Metallic Obsidian Black, Manufaktur Opalith White Mango, and Manufaktur Olive Mango. Each colour is limited to 500 units. Along with the special livery and badges, the Final Edition G 500 is fitted with double-five-spoke 20-inch wheels, a Burmester Hi-Fi stereo system, and active multi-contour seats in two-tone Manufaktur leather. The headliner, luggage compartment, and seat switch panel are covered with leather. The retail price for the "Final Edition G 500 V8" is $215,015 USD.

=== Production End of W463 ===
Daimler AG announced the production of current W463 generation to be ended in March 2024 with the updated version to be introduced sometime in 2024. The updated version is to have more improvement in aerodynamic and lower fuel consumption along with styling cues from EQG concept car. With six-year production, the second-generation W463 has the shortest production time of all G-Class versions (except the special production of W462). No official information is given yet what nomenclature will be assigned to the updated version: the designation, W465, has been proposed by the media outlet.

=== Concept EQG ===
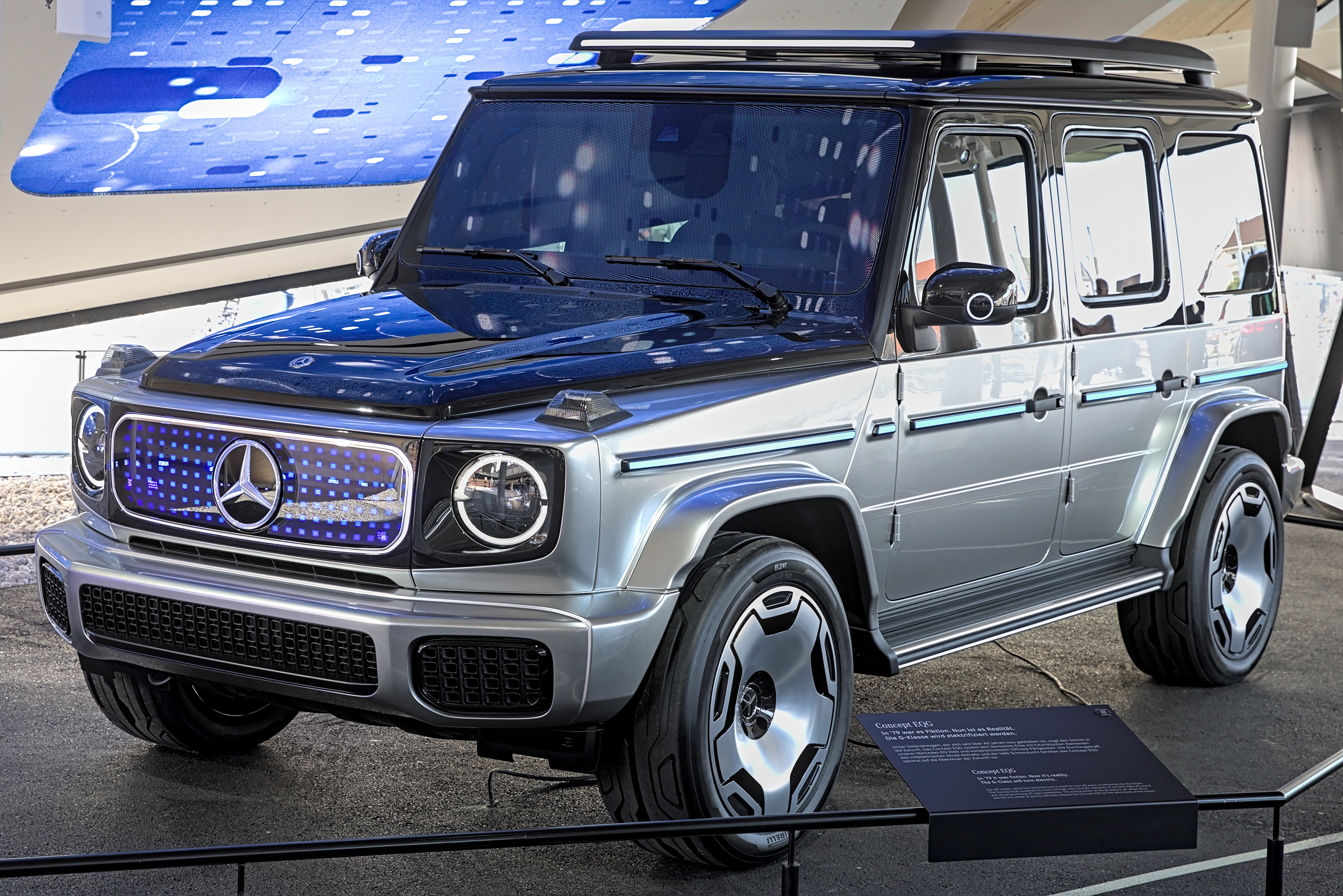
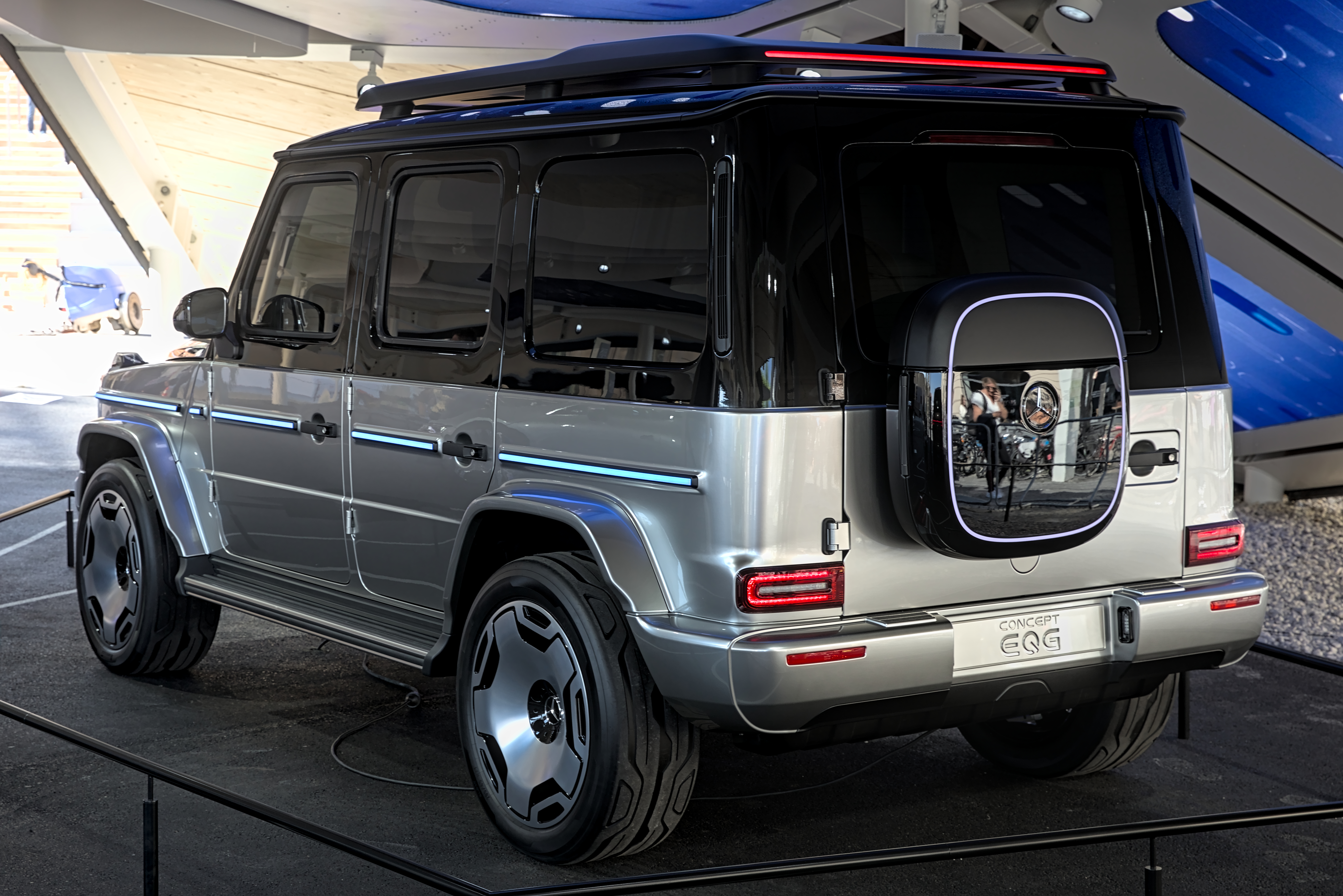
Mercedes-Benz Concept EQG front view at the 2021 IAA

On 5 September 2021, Mercedes-Benz previewed Concept EQG, the G-Class concept car with pure electric drive, at IAA Mobility 2021 in Munich. Externally, Concept EQG carries the styling of the second generation G-Class, with updated elements to distinguish the electric variant, such as a square tire cover, extensive additional LED lighting including a LED Black Panel grille, updated front and rear fascias, new 22-inch wheels, and special roof rack. While Mercedes-Benz has not revealed the technical data yet, Concept EQG has four electric motors that are placed closer to the wheels and that can operate independently; the battery packs are 108 kWH. Additionally, a two-speed gearbox allows the gear reductions for the off-road travel. The model names are EQG 560 4MATIC and EQG 580 4MATIC. The production version is confirmed for 2024.

=== Technical data ===
==== Engines (2018–2024) ====
Model	Years	Configuration	Displacement	Power	Torque	0–100 km/h (0–62 mph)	Top speed	Fuel consumption/efficiency (EU-norm combined)
Petrol engines
G 350 (China)	09/2020–03/2024	I4 turbocharger (M264 E20 DEH LA)	1,991 cc (121.5 cu in)	190 kW (258 PS; 255 hp)	370 N⋅m (273 lb⋅ft)	8.1 seconds	190 km/h (118 mph)	10.7 L/100 km (22 mpg_{‑US})
G 500 / G 550	05/2018–09/2023	V8 twin-turbo (M176 DE40 LA)	3,982 cc (243.0 cu in)	310 kW (421 PS; 416 hp) at 5,250–5,500 rpm	610 N⋅m (450 lb⋅ft) at 2,250–4,750 rpm	5.9 seconds	210 km/h (130 mph)	11.5–12.1 L/100 km (20.5–19.4 mpg_{‑US})
G 63 AMG	06/2018–03/2024	V8 twin-turbo (M 177 DE 40 AL)	3,982 cc (243.0 cu in)	430 kW (585 PS; 577 hp) at 6,000 rpm	850 N⋅m (627 lb⋅ft) at 2,500–3,500 rpm	4.5 seconds	220 km/h (137 mph) / 240 km/h (149 mph)*	11.5–12.1 L/100 km (20.5–19.4 mpg_{‑US})
Diesel engines
G 350 d	01/2019–03/2024	Inline 6 turbo (OM 656 D29T R SCR)	2,925 cc (178.5 cu in)	210 kW (286 PS; 282 hp) at 3,400 rpm	600 N⋅m (443 lb⋅ft) at 1,200–3,200 rpm	7.4 seconds	200 km/h (124 mph)	9.6–9.8 L/100 km (25–24 mpg_{‑US})
G 400 d	07/2019–03/2024	Inline 6 turbo (OM 656 D29T SCR)	2,925 cc (178.5 cu in)	243 kW (330 PS; 326 hp) at 3,400 rpm	700 N⋅m (516 lb⋅ft) at 1,200–3,200 rpm	6.4 seconds	210 km/h (130 mph)	9.6 L/100 km (25 mpg_{‑US})

*With optional extra cost AMG Driver's Package

==== Transmission (2018–2024) ====
Model	Years	Types
G 350	2020–2024	9-speed 9G-Tronic automatic
G 500 / G 550	2018–2024	9-speed 9G-Tronic automatic
G 63	2024–present	9-speed AMG Speedshift TCT automatic
G 350 d	2019–2024	9-speed 9G-Tronic automatic
G 400 d	2019–2024	9-speed 9G-Tronic automatic

=== Safety ===
Euro NCAP test results* Mercedes-Benz G-Class (2019)
Test	Points	%
Overall:	5 /5 stars	
Adult occupant:	34.6	90%
Child occupant:	40.8	83%
Pedestrian:	37.5	78%
Safety assist:	9.4	72%

ANCAP test results* Mercedes-Benz G-Class G63 and G400d variants only (2019, aligned with Euro NCAP)
Test	Points	%
Overall:	5 /5 stars	
Adult occupant:	34.5	90%
Child occupant:	41.7	85%
Pedestrian:	37.4	78%
Safety assist:	9.5	73%

== W464 (2022–present) ==
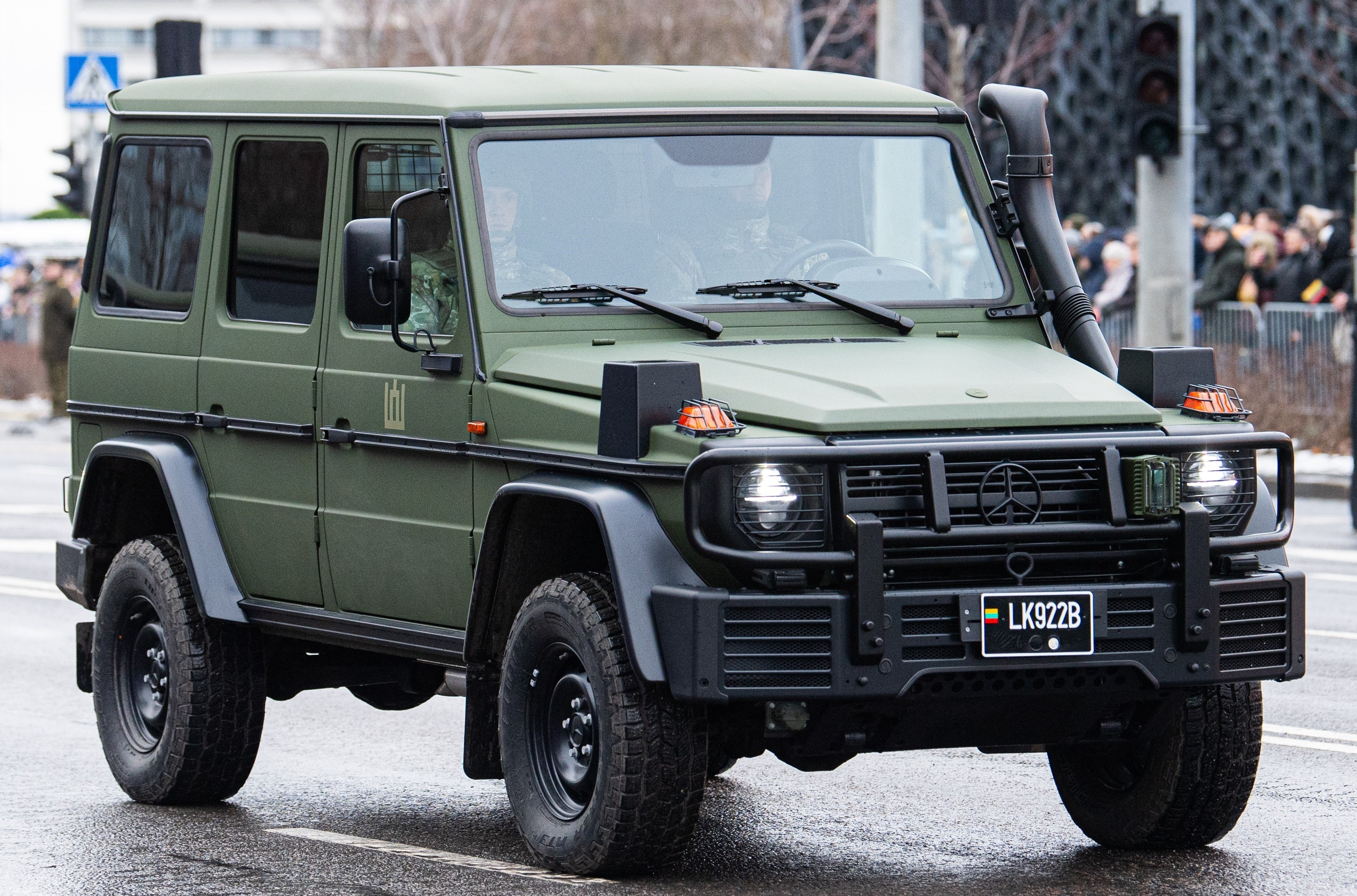
Mercedes-Benz G350 (W464)

After thirty years in production, the W461 model for militaries has been replaced by the second generation G-Class, designated “Type-BR464” or W464 in October 2021. The New G 350d model with a new engine, the nine-speed automatic gearbox, and the front end with a heavy-duty steel bumper, larger cooling grille, and updated LED headlamp and daytime running lamp units. The W464 is offered in two body configurations: 5-door Station Wagon (BA06) and Single-Cab version (BA09). Unlike the W463 (2018–2024), the W464 still retains the solid axle for front and rear with front, central, and rear differential locks, spartan interior, 24-volt electrical system, and heavy-duty chassis.

The 2.9-litre six-cylinder inline diesel engine (OM656, unspecified version) is detuned for Euro III-compliance so the low-quality diesel fuel (500 ppm), most common in African and Central Asian countries, can be used. The engine has been tested to run 400 hours on diesel fuel with higher sulphur content (3,000 ppm). As result, the engine output is lowered to 135 kW (184 PS; 181 hp) while retaining the same 600 N⋅m (443 lb⋅ft).

The engine fitted to W464 has a special feature called "Emergency Override Switch" (EOS). When the engine malfunctions due to technical, mechanical, or electrical issues, the emergency mode (limp-home or shutdown) is activated as to protect the engine from damage. If the emergency mode is activated when the military crew is fleeing the dangerous environment, the operator can activate the EOS to override the emergency/protection mode in order to escape to the safety.

As of June 2025, a civilian version of W464 has not been offered to the public yet despite the popularity of W461 civilian version in the past.

== W465 (2024–present) ==
Mercedes-Benz G-Class (W465)
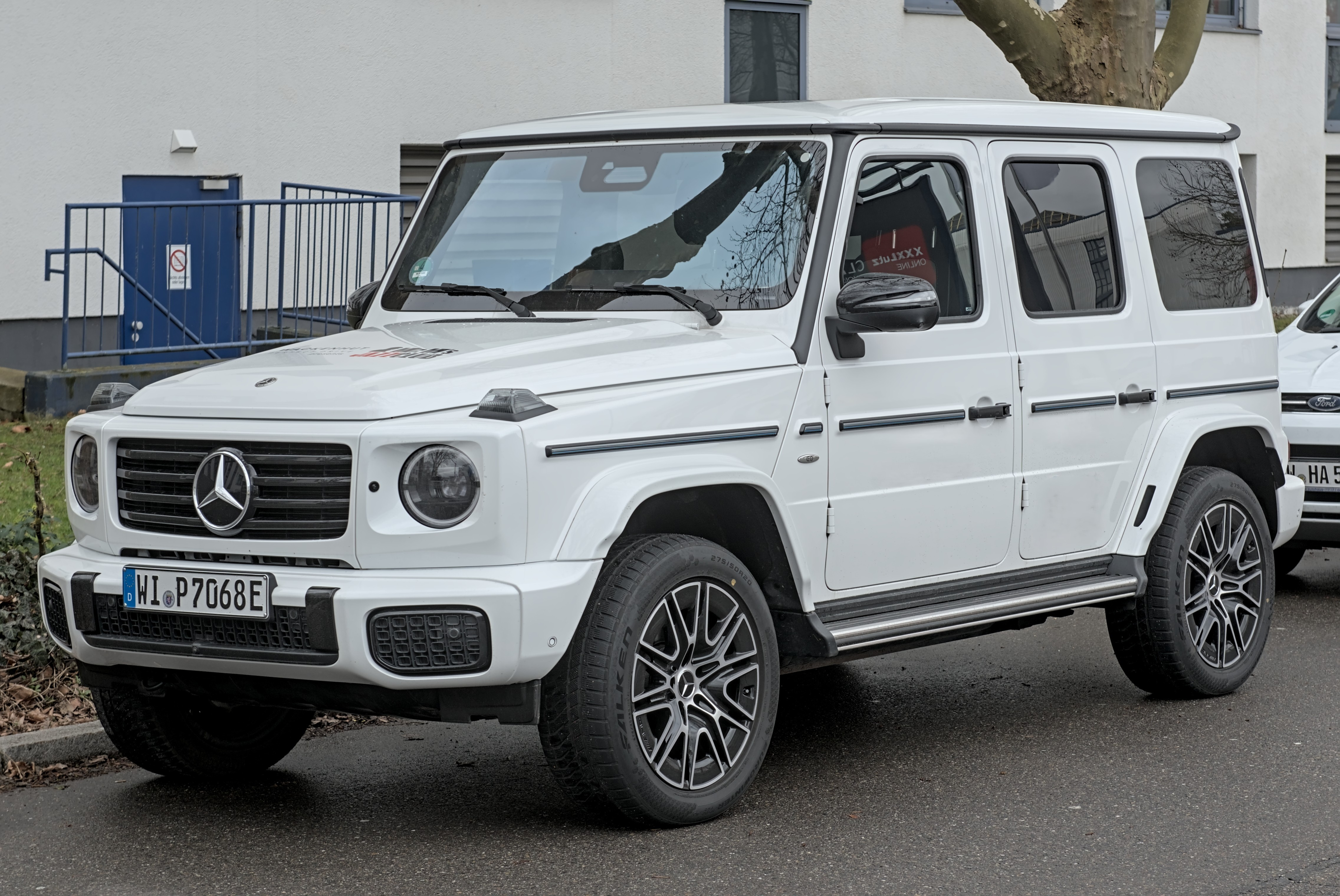

Overview
- Production: April 2024–present
- Assembly: Austria: Graz (Magna Steyr)
- Designer: Hans-Peter Bildhäuser

Body and chassis
- Class: Mid-size luxury SUV
- Body style: 5-door SUV
- Layout: F4 (4MATIC); IWD (G 580 with EQ Technology)

Powertrain
- Engine: Petrol: 3.0 L M256 I6 turbocharged; 4.0 L M177 V8 twin-turbo; Diesel: 3.0 L OM656 D30T M I6 turbocharged
- Transmission: 9-speed 9G-Tronic automatic 9-speed AMG SpeedShift TCT automatic 2-speed gearbox

Dimensions
- Wheelbase: 2,890 mm (113.8 in)
- Length: 4,625–4,873 mm (182.1–191.9 in)
- Width: 1,931–1,948 mm (76.0–76.7 in)
- Height: 1,986–2,042 mm (78.2–80.4 in)
- Curb weight: 2,485–3,085 kg (5,478–6,801 lb)

Chronology
- Predecessor: W463 2

The W465 is the new generation of G-Class introduced on 26 March 2024 with three engines carried over from the W463, a 3-litre petrol I6 and a 2.9-litre diesel I6, as well as a 4-litre petrol V8. The 4-litre petrol V8 fitted in the G 500/G 550 was not carried over and was replaced by the 3-litre petrol I6. The Mercedes-AMG G 63 remains the only W465 with a V8 petrol engine. The new W465 with petrol and diesel engines are fitted with a 48-volt hybrid system.

=== G 580 with EQ Technology ===
A month later on 24 April 2024, the electric version, G 580 with EQ Technology, was introduced. This model was inspired by the Concept EQG and first electric vehicle from Mercedes-Benz not to have a separate EQ model.

The electric G-Class, G 580 with EQ Technology, has sold 1,450 in a one-year period compared 9,000 units for the G-Class with internal combustion engines. Various reasons for its poor sales are heavier gross weight (3,085 kg or 6,746 lbs), short range (473 km on WLTP cycle and 239 miles on EPA cycle), higher price than ICE-equipped G-Class, and lack of towbar option (important for the European customers).

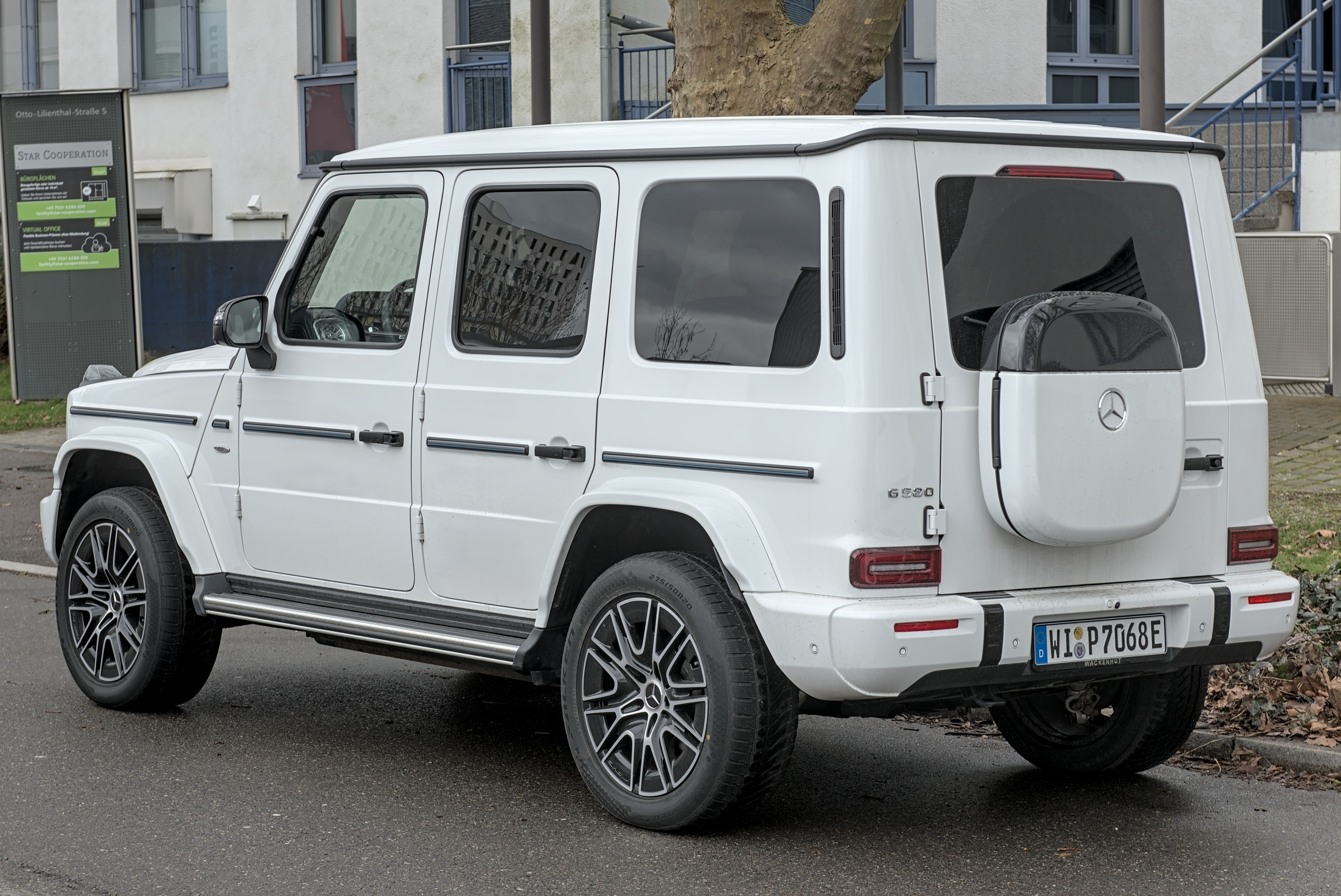
Rear view

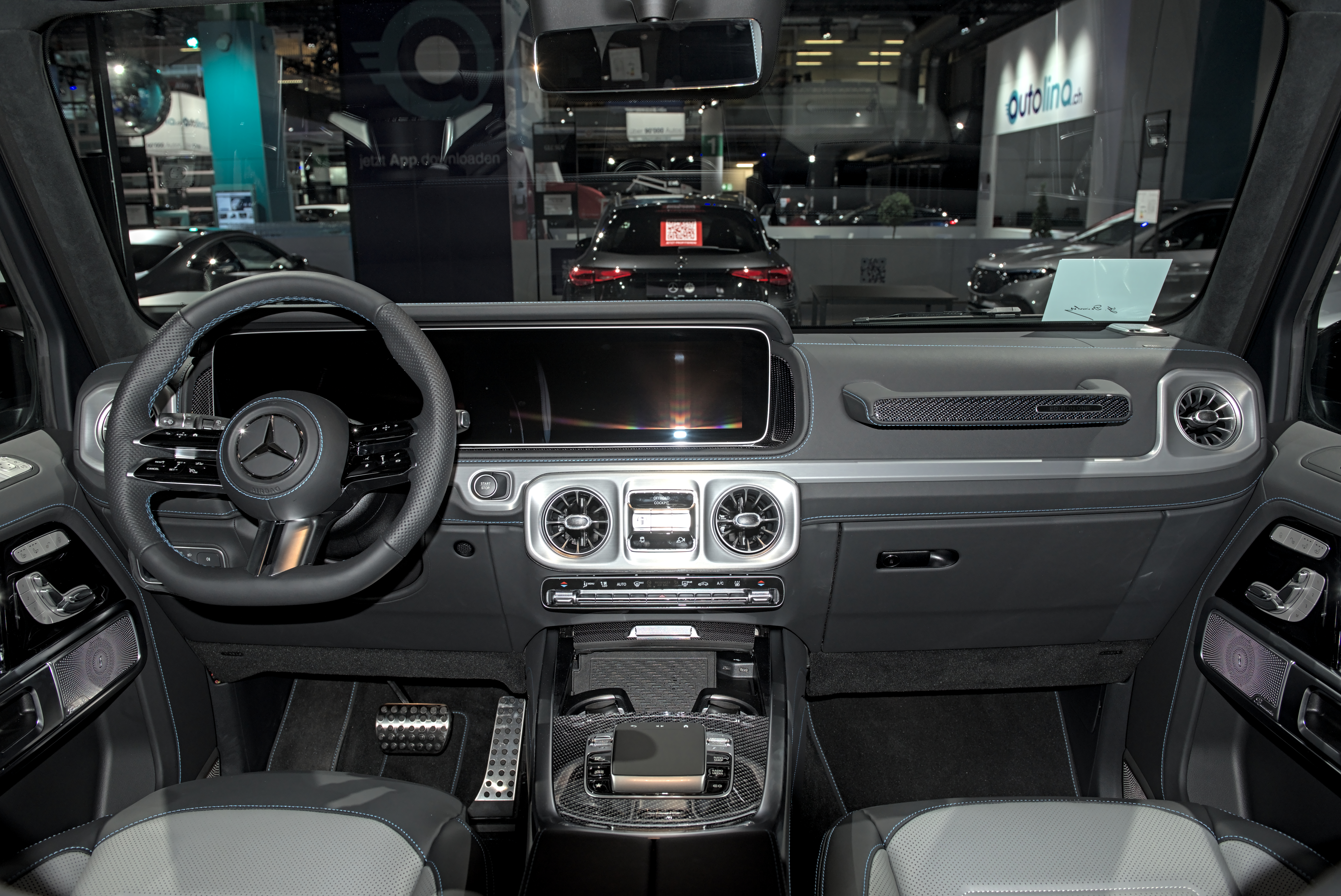
Interior

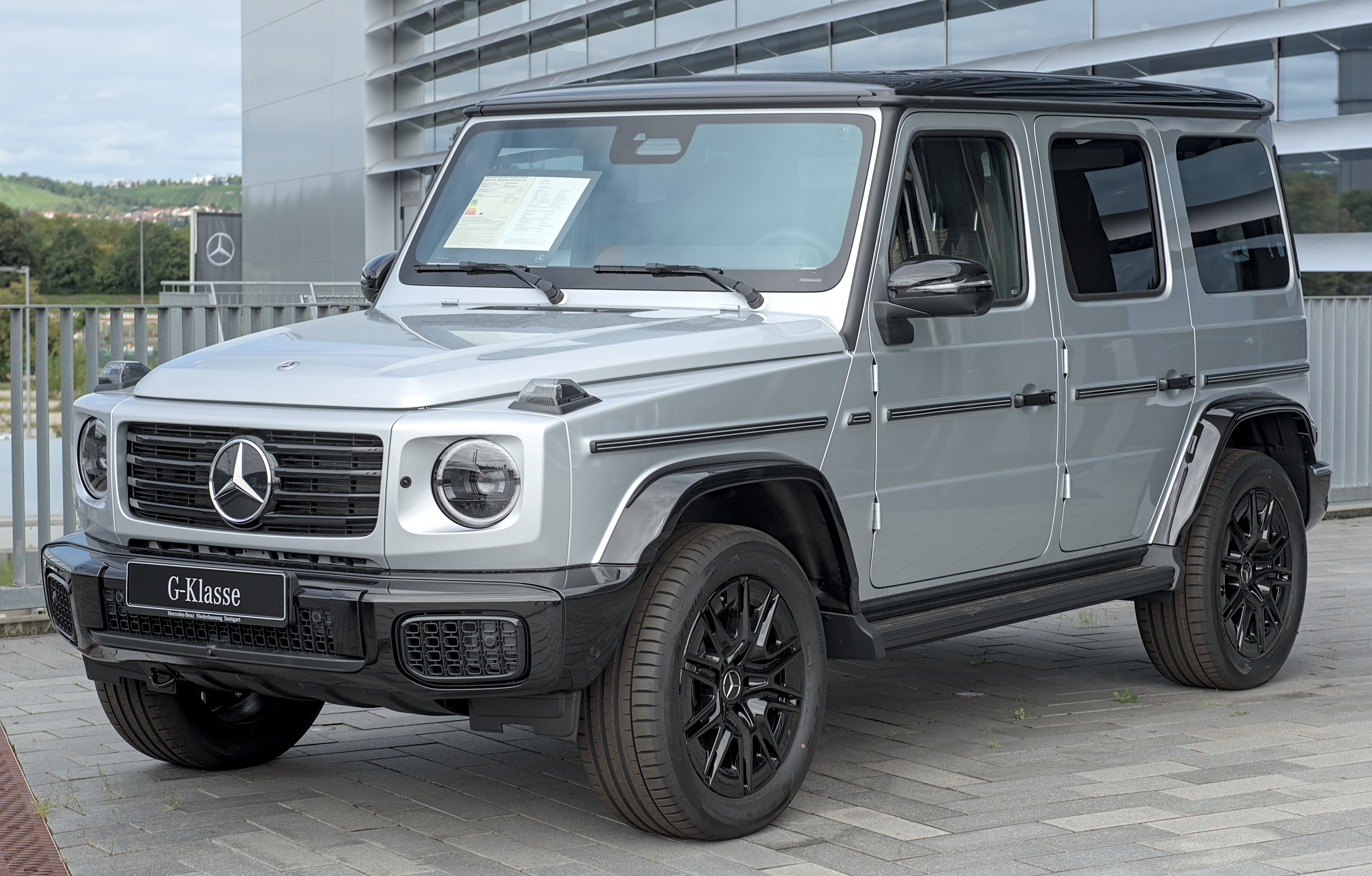
G 450 d

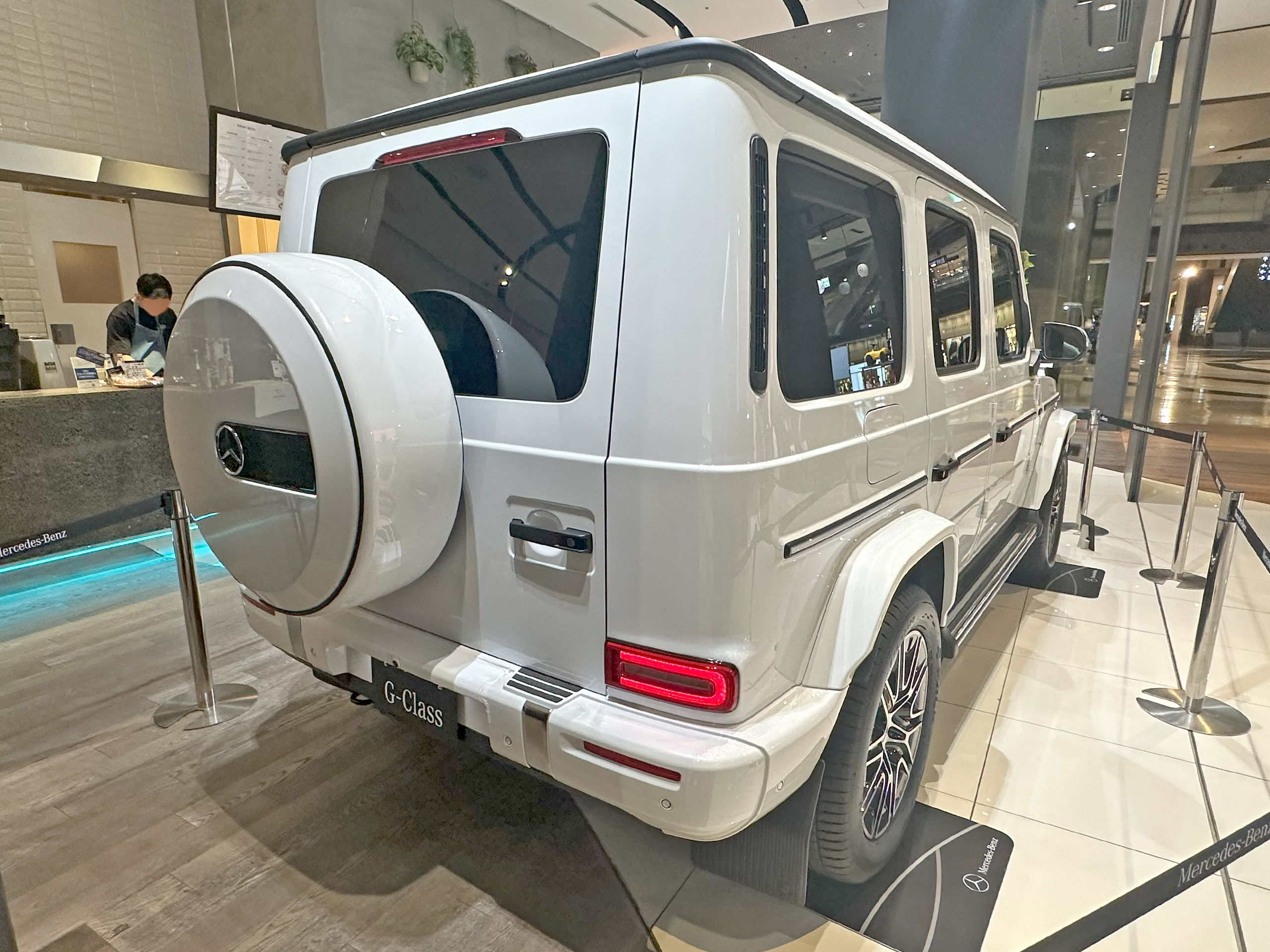
G 450 d (rear view)

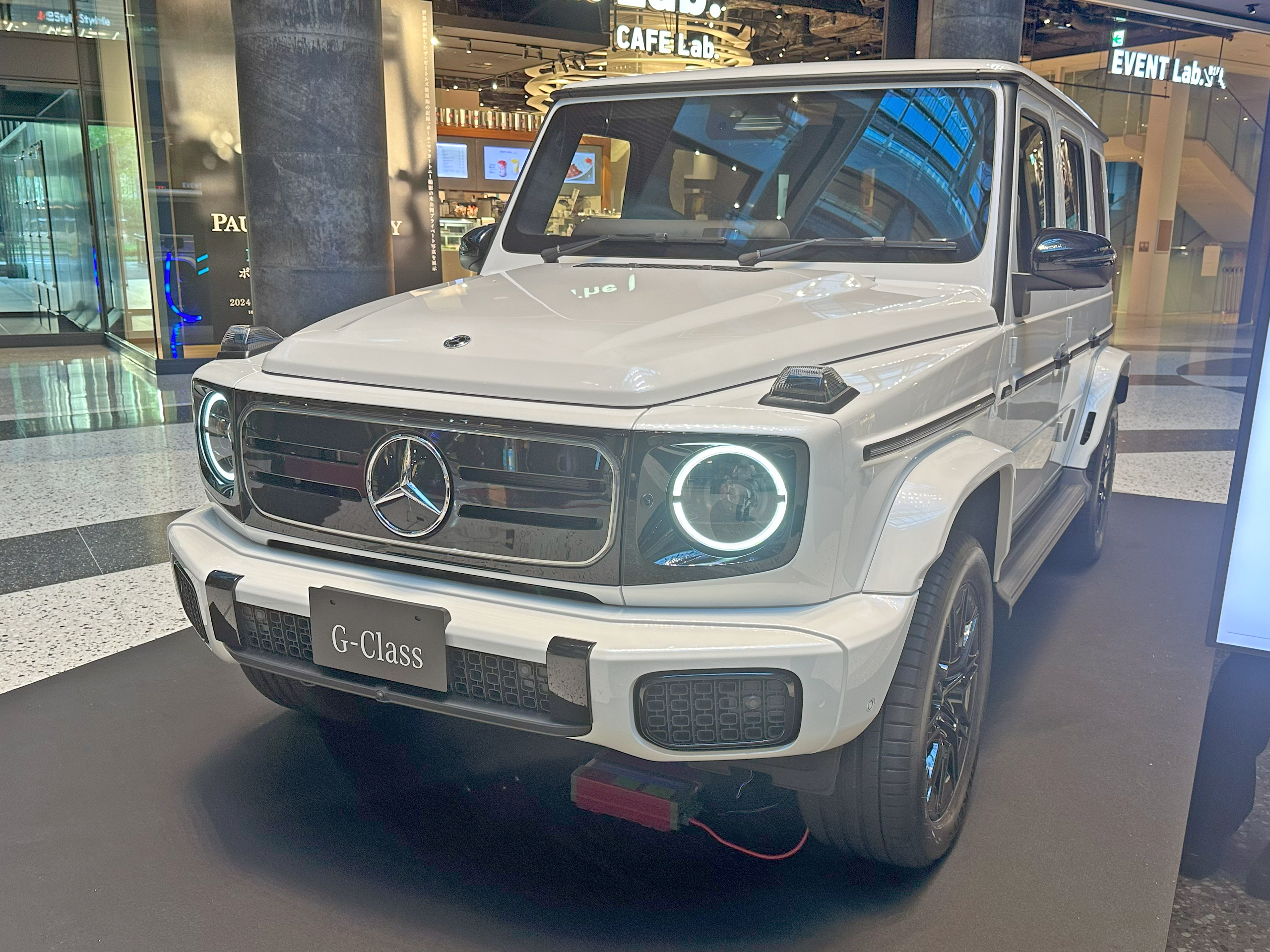
G 580 with EQ Technology

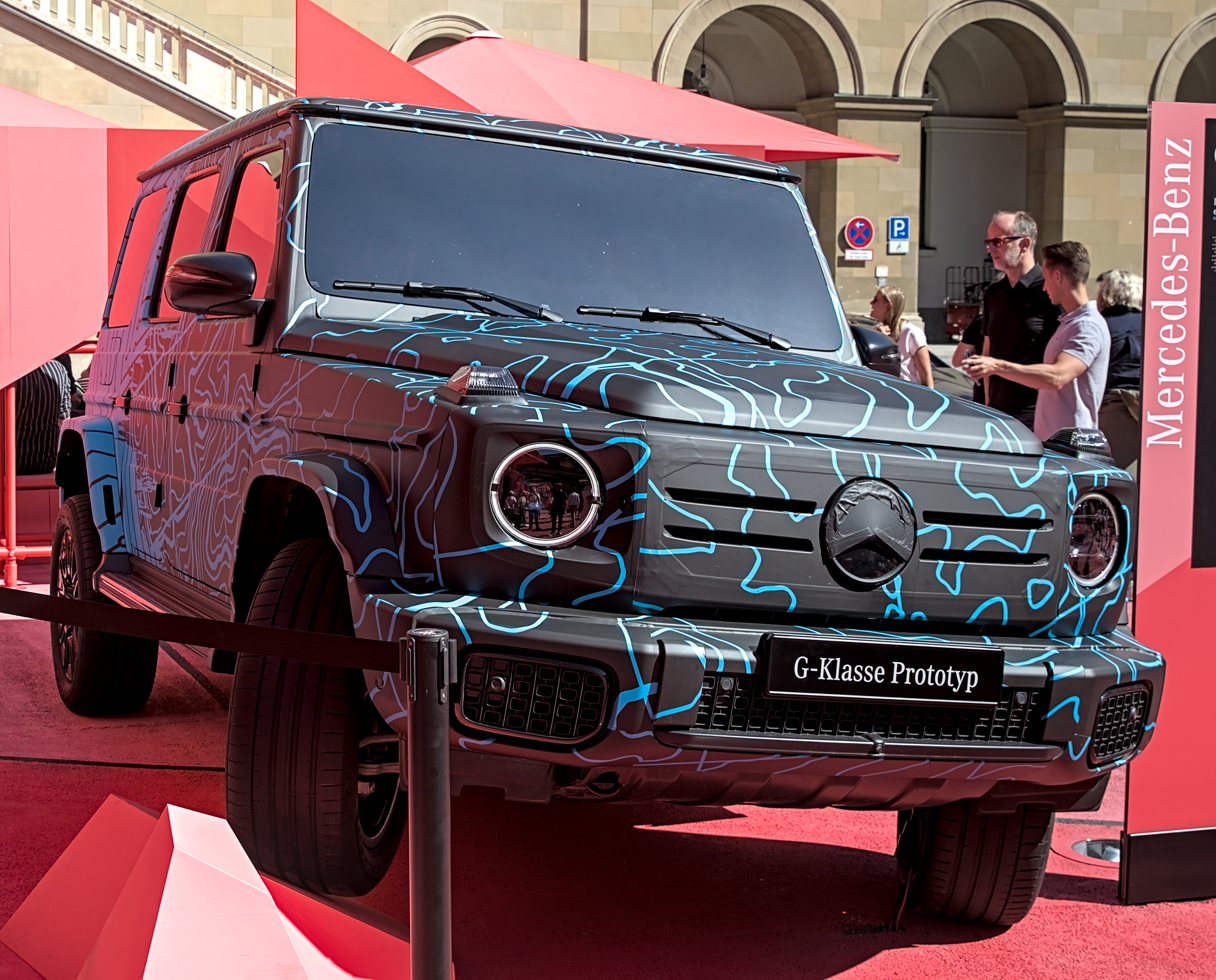
G-Class EV Prototype at 2023 Munich Motor Show

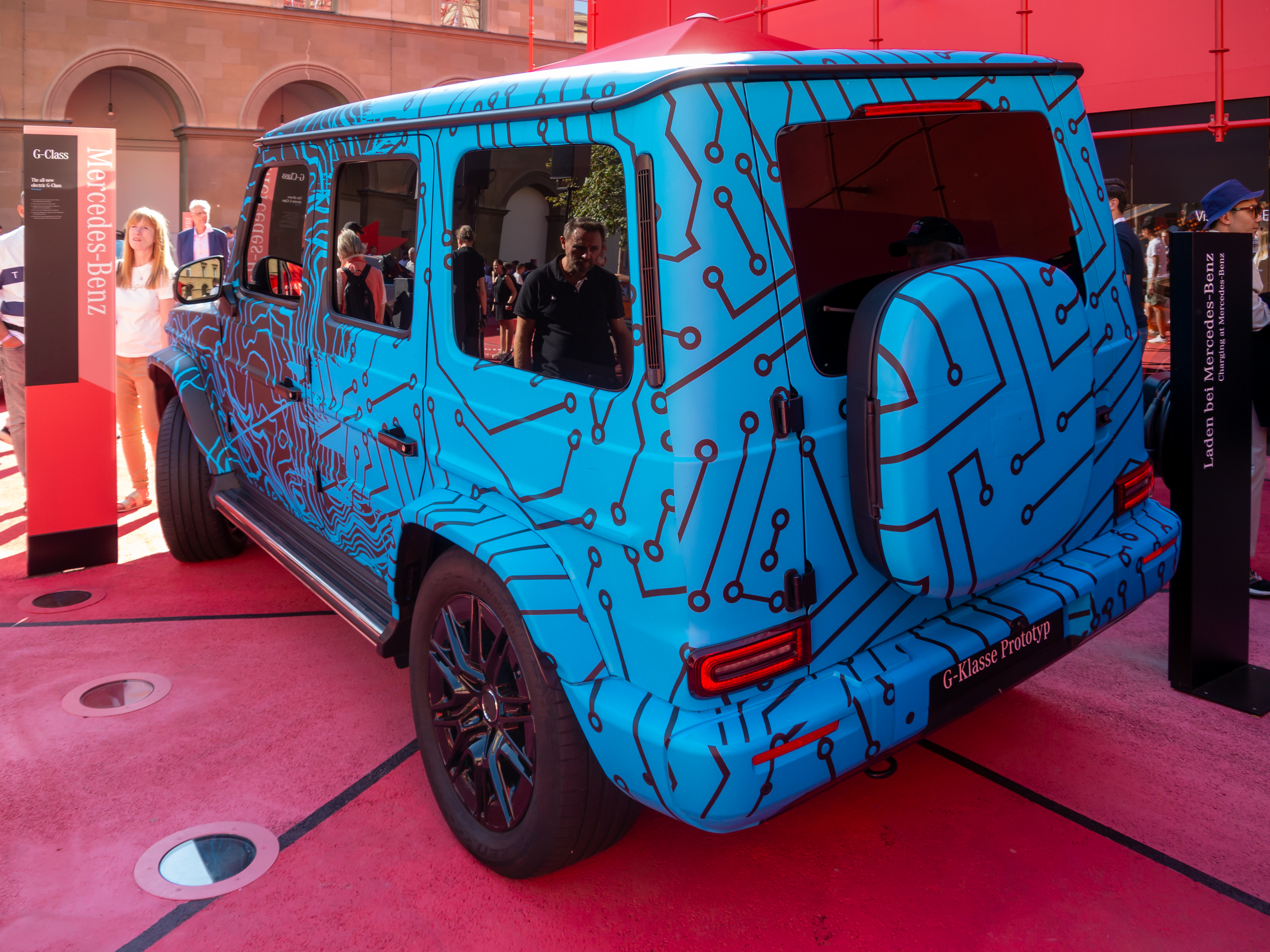
G-Class EV Prototype (rear view)

=== Engines (2024–present) ===
Model	Years	Configuration	Displacement	Power	Torque	0–100 km/h (0–62 mph)	Top speed	Fuel consumption/efficiency (EU-norm combined)
Petrol engines
G 500 / G 550	2024–present	Inline 6 turbo (M 256)	2,999 cc (183.0 cu in)	330 kW (449 PS; 443 hp) + 15 kW (20 PS; 20 hp) at 5,800–6,100 rpm	560 N⋅m (413 lb⋅ft) + 200 N⋅m (148 lb⋅ft) at 2,200–5,000 rpm	5.4 seconds	210 km/h (130 mph)	10.9–12.3 L/100 km (21.6–19.1 mpg_{‑US})
G 63	2024–present	V8 turbo (M 177)	3,982 cc (243.0 cu in)	430 kW (585 PS; 577 hp) + 15 kW (20 PS; 20 hp) at 6,000 rpm	850 N⋅m (627 lb⋅ft) + 200 N⋅m (148 lb⋅ft) at 2,500–3,500 rpm	4.4 seconds	210 km/h (130 mph) (240 km/h (149 mph)*	14.7–15.7 L/100 km (16.0–15.0 mpg_{‑US})
Diesel engines
G 450 d	2024–present	Inline 6 turbo (OM 656)	2,990 cc (182 cu in)	270 kW (367 PS; 362 hp) + 15 kW (20 PS; 20 hp) at 4,000 rpm	750 N⋅m (553 lb⋅ft) + 200 N⋅m (148 lb⋅ft) at 1,350–2,800 rpm	5.8 seconds	210 km/h (130 mph)	8.7–10.0 L/100 km (27–24 mpg_{‑US})
Electric
G 580 with EQ Technology	2024–present	4 electric motors	NA	432 kW (587 PS; 579 hp)	1,165 N⋅m (859 lb⋅ft)	4.7 seconds	180 km/h (112 mph)	27,7–30,3 kWh

*With optional extra cost AMG Performance Package

==== Transmission (2024–present) ====
Model	Years	Types
G 500	2024–present	9-speed 9G-Tronic automatic
G 63	2024–present	9-speed AMG Speedshift TCT automatic
G 450 d	2024–present	9-speed 9G-Tronic automatic
G 580 with EQ Technology	2024–present	2-speed gearbox

== Military operators ==
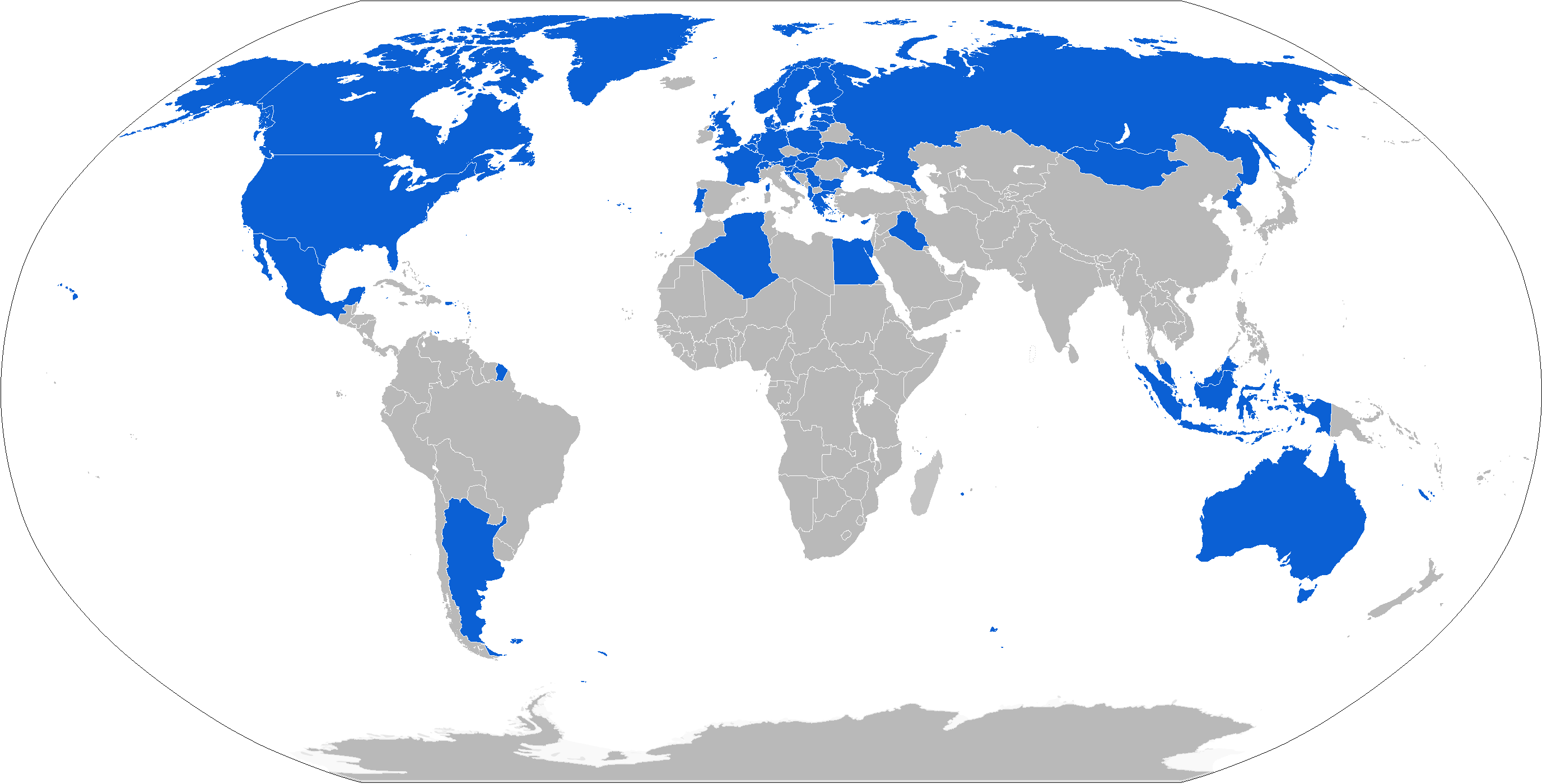
Map of military Mercedes-Benz G-Class operators

Albania
Since the 2010s, the Albanian Army has been using G-Class vehicles.

Algeria
Since the 2010s, the Algerian Army, Gendarmerie Nationale and the Algerian police have been using several models of G-Class vehicles 4x4 6x6 G 500. Most of those vehicles are manufactured in Bouchekif factory Tiaret, owned by the Algerian army. First G-Class wagons released in 2015.

Argentina
Since the 1980s, the Argentine Army has used the MB-230G (short and long chassis) for different purposes. 900 remain in service.

Australia
In October 2007, Mercedes-Benz became the preferred tenderer for the Australian Defence Force to replace the fleet of Land Rover Perentie in Project Land 121 Overlander. Mercedes-Benz was the sole tenderer with neither Toyota for the Land Cruiser or Land Rover for the Defender submitting a proposal. In October 2008, an initial contract for 1200 vehicles was signed. 2,268 vehicles were purchased with ten variants including 6x6. The first G-Wagons were delivered in February 2010.

Australia is the first military customer to receive 6×6 vehicles and these are the first six-wheel military vehicles built by Mercedes-Benz since 1941.

Austria
The Austrian Army has been a long time user of various Puch G models.

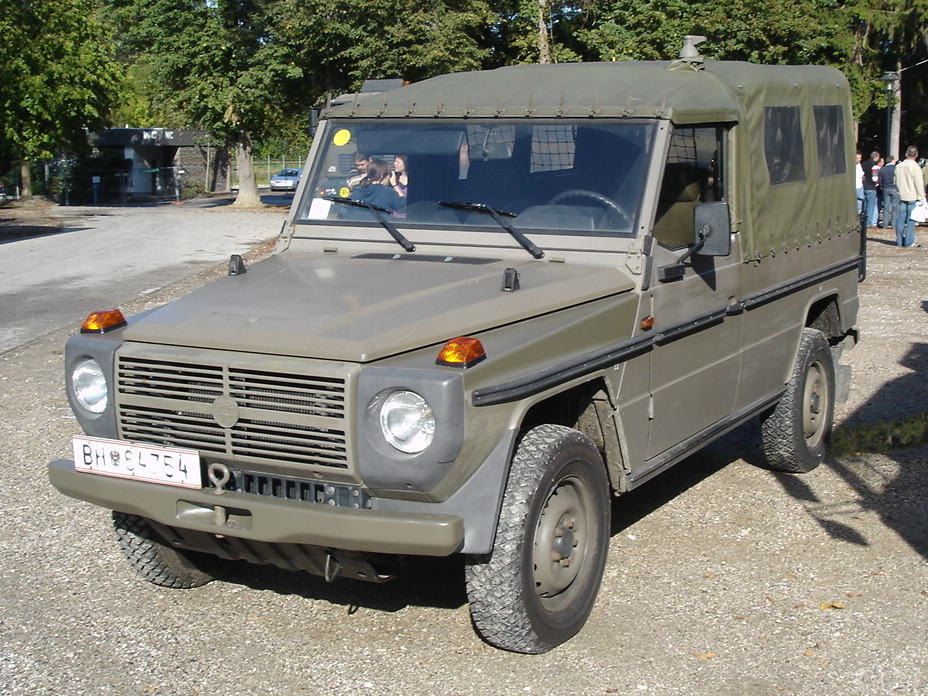
A Puch G of the Austrian Army.

Belgium
The Belgian Police or "Gendarmerie-Rijkswacht" has been a long time user of first G 500 models.

Bulgaria
The Bulgarian Army operates 600+ vehicles in various configurations, most of them armed.

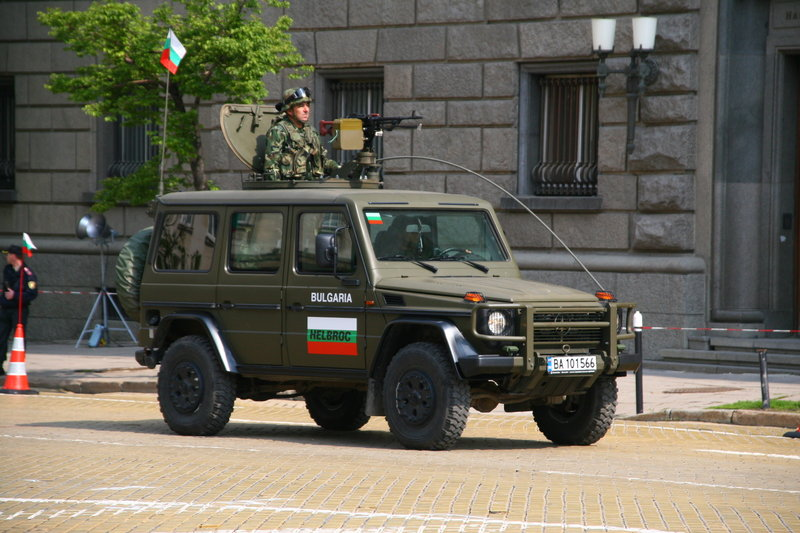
Bulgarian army G-class with HELBROC insignia

Cambodia
Royal Gendarmerie of Cambodia purchased 30 armored Mercedes-Benz G-Class from RMA Cambodia.

Cameroon
60 "Wolf" in service with the Cameroon Armed Forces.

Canada
A total of 1,159 vehicles have been ordered by the Canadian Army beginning in late 2003. Canada purchased three variants including: with Gun turret; non turreted; and military police. These vehicles are utilised by both Regular and Reserve units. An armoured kit can be fitted (or removed) in 8 hours by three soldiers. Their light armour has been criticised for leading to loss of life in Afghanistan, however it is considerably better than the Iltis predecessor. The CAF settled on a replacement called the Textron tactical armoured patrol vehicle (TAPV) in 2012. For the most exposed missions in Afghanistan 75 RG-31 Nyalas built by BAE Land Systems OMC, South Africa were used.

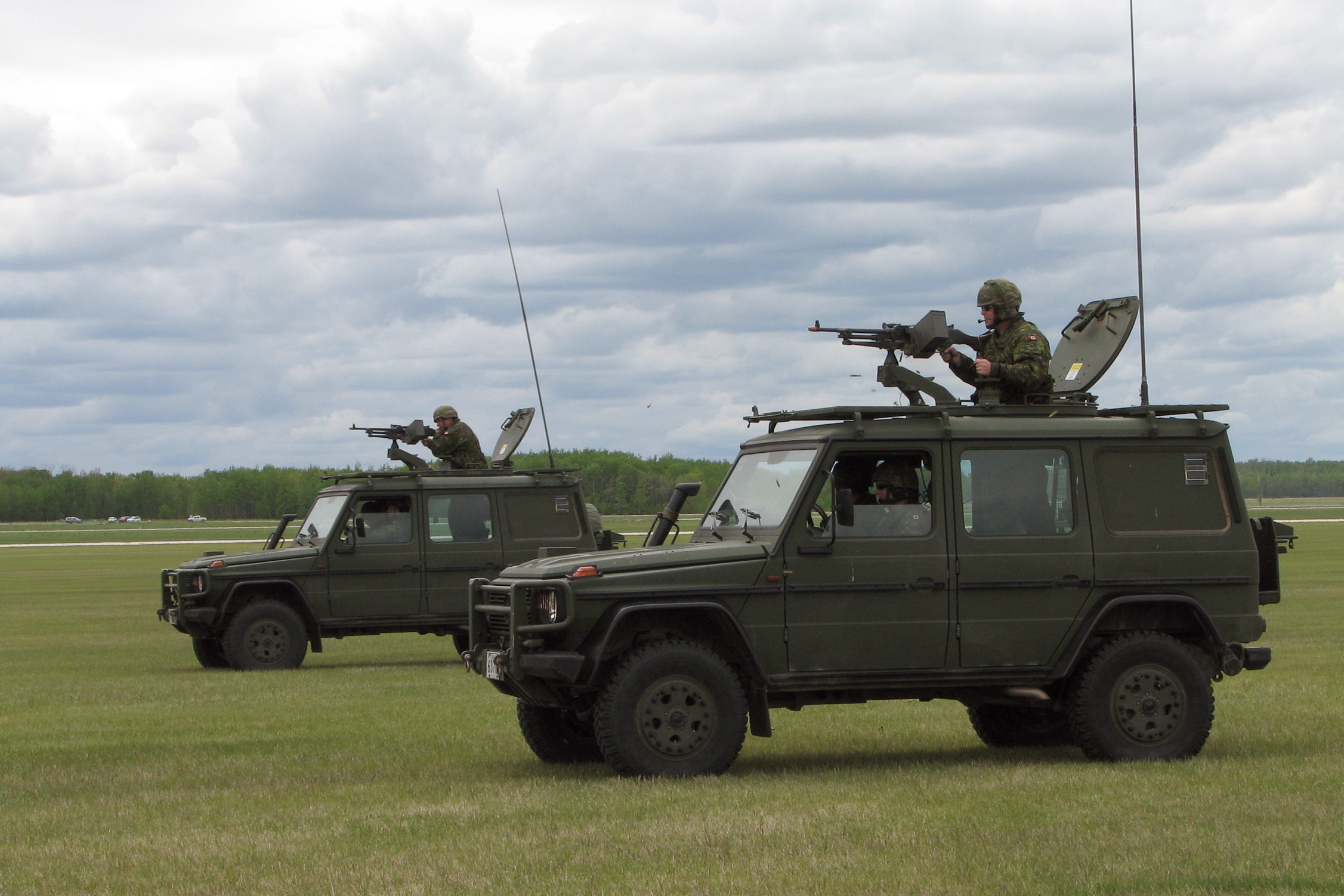
Canadian Army G-Wagens

Chile
The Chilean Army has been using the W461 for many decades in many configurations.

Croatia
Croatia bought 300 to 320 vehicles for needs of Croatian army and for operations in Afghanistan additional 30 RG-31 vehicles were delivered. Croatia uses mix of 4×4 vehicles in peacekeeping operations and the G-Class is a very popular choice within the Croatian Army. G-Class is supplemented by Land Rover Wolf and Iveco LMV.

Denmark
The Danish military bought the 240 GD (/24, /28 and /34 variants) to supersede the M151A1, the Volkswagen 181 ("Jagdwagen") and the Land Rover 88. First deliveries of the 240 GD were in 1985 and later the 290 GD (/24 and /28 variants) were also introduced. More than 1,300 have been put in service. A few 300 GE's have also been used — mainly by the Danish army EOD-services. Currently the Danes are taking delivery of over 2,000 270CDIs in several variants, starting in 2003.

East Timor
used by units of Army of the Timor Leste Defence Force.

Egypt
The Egyptian Army uses the G 320 (4 × 4) armoured personnel carrier has been designed as a private venture by the Kader Factory for Developed Industries and is based on the chassis of the commercial German Mercedes-Benz MB 320G (4 × 4) light vehicle. This vehicle is based on the long-wheelbase version of the German Mercedes-Benz G 320 4 × 4 with the chassis frame being modified by a heavy-duty suspension which has been designed to withstand the additional weight imposed by the armour package.

Estonia
The Estonian Defence Forces have a small number of various G-Class vehicles, which were purchased to replace the outdated UAZ and Volkswagen Iltis vehicles.

Finland
The Finnish Army uses the Geländewagen mostly as armored vehicles and ambulances, but other versions are also in service.

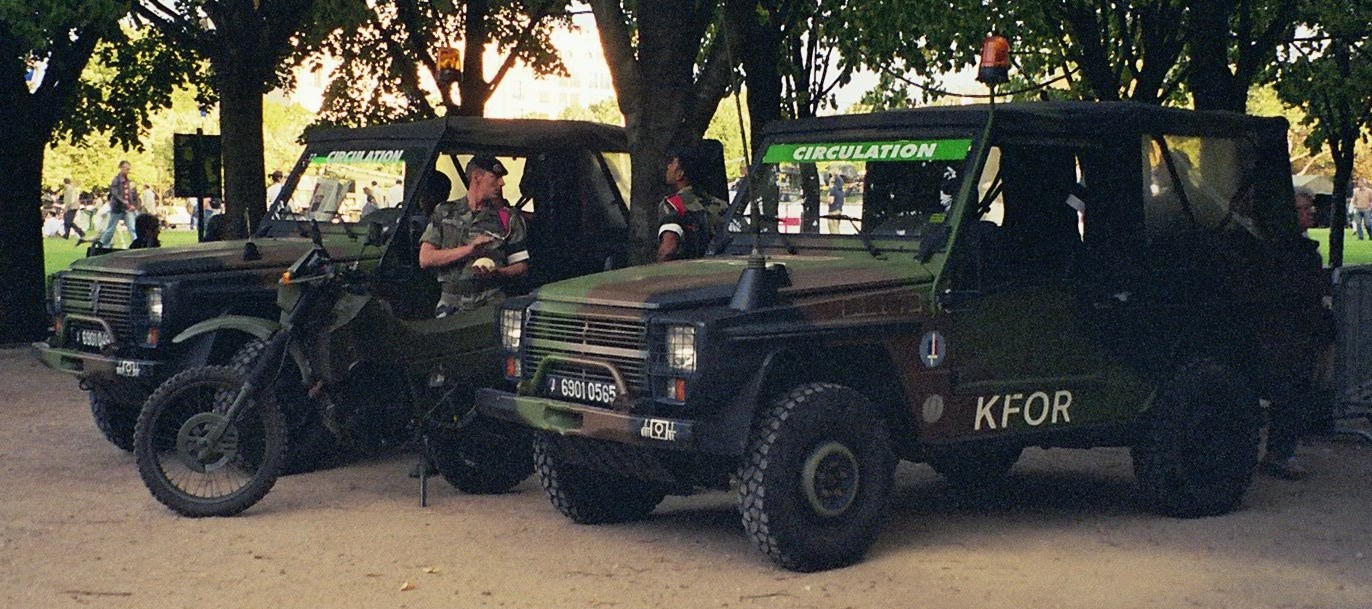
French Army Peugeot P4s

France
The French Army has the Peugeot P4 which is a derivative from the G-Class equipped with Peugeot engine and equipment.

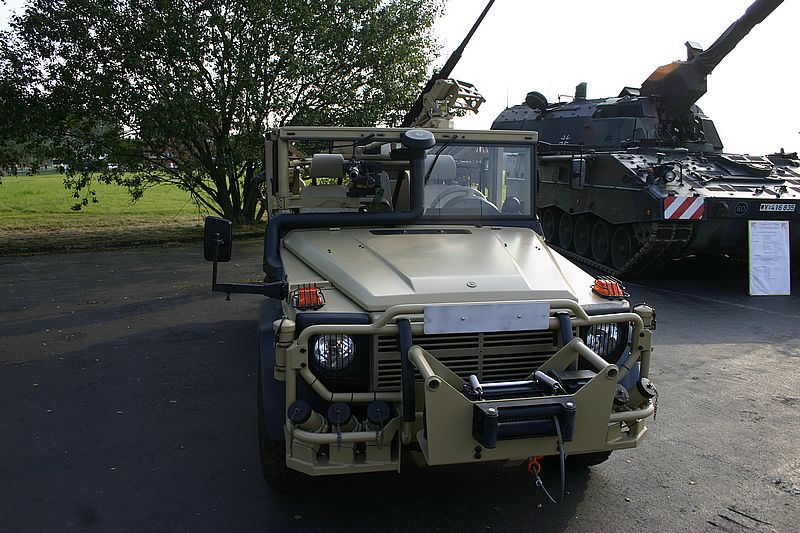
AGF (Light infantry vehicle) of the German special forces

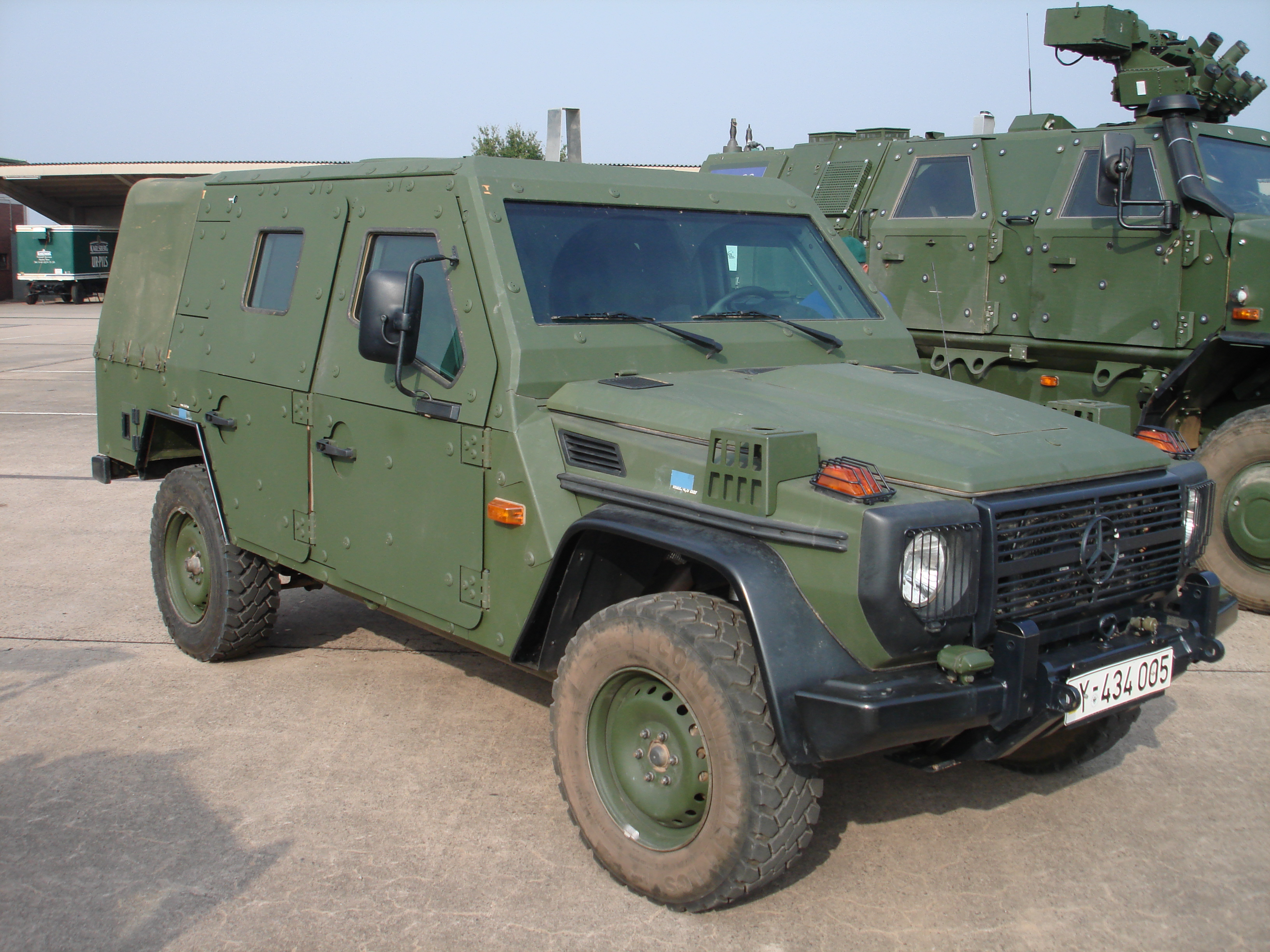
A LAPV Enok, the latest armored model of the German Army

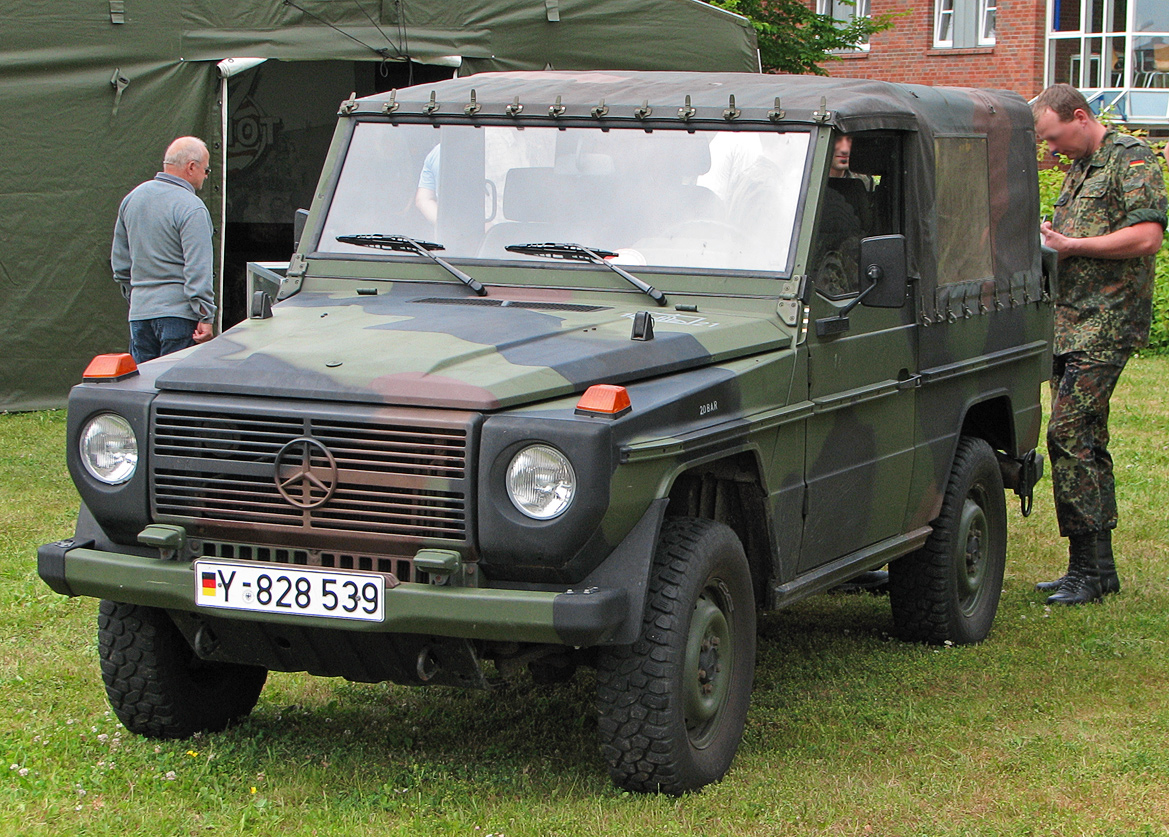
A Wolf of the German Army

West Germany
W460 accepted into Federal Border Guards (Bundesgrenzschutz) service 1978 but rejected from German Armed Forces (Bundeswehr) service in favor of the Volkswagen Iltis.

Germany
W461 accepted into Bundeswehr service 1989 to replace the Volkswagen Iltis, deliveries from 1993 onward. The Bundeswehr uses the G-Class under the name "Wolf". Over 12,000 vehicles have been delivered in over 50 versions, ranging from ambulance vehicles to armored variants used by German special forces (LAPV Enok).

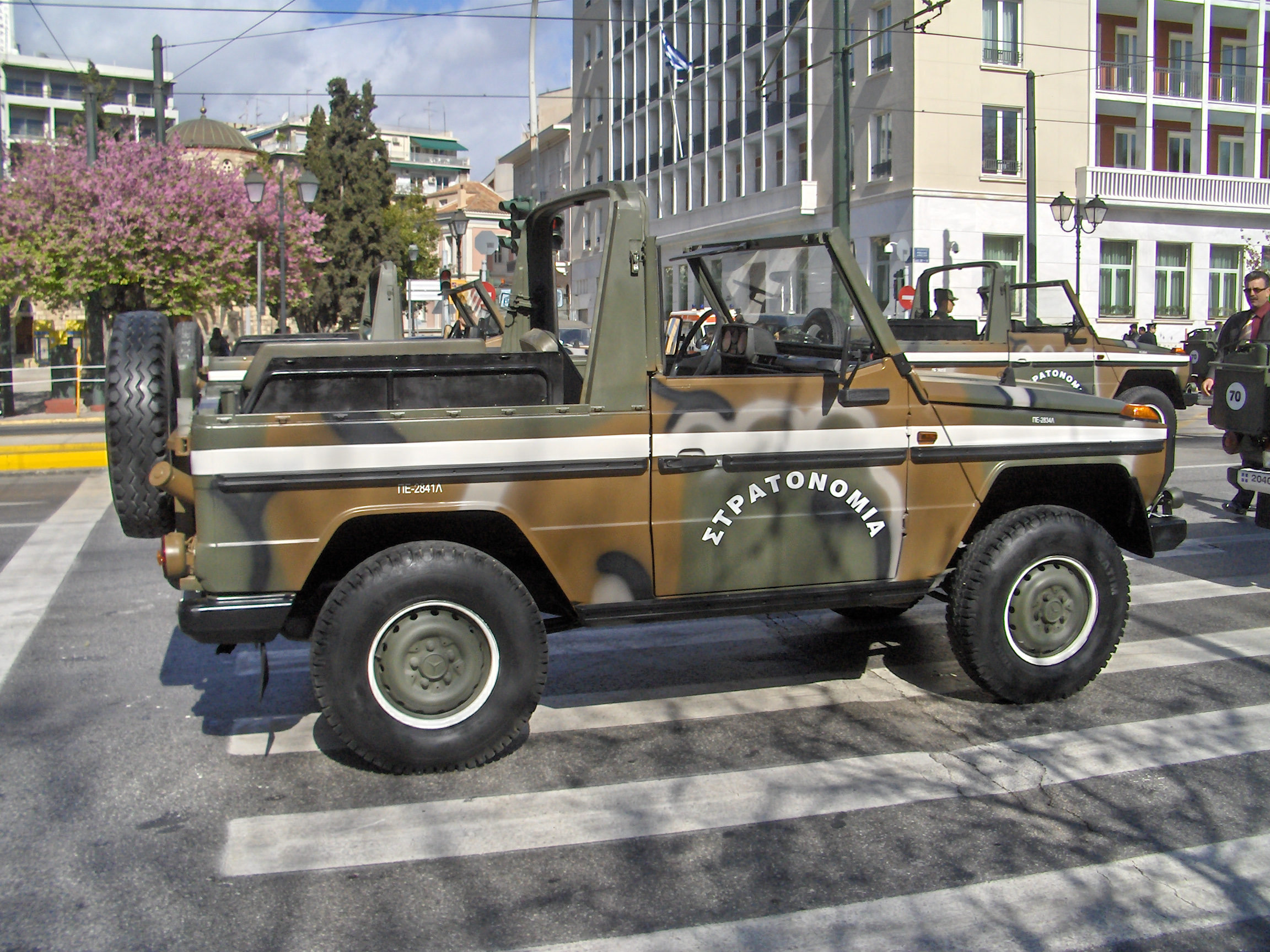
A Greek Army vehicle in Military Police colours

Greece
The Greek Army as well as Air Force, Navy and Police have several versions (462) of the Geländewagen, manufactured by ELBO the Hellenic Vehicles Industry.

Hungary
The Hungarian Ground Forces have 233 of G-270 CDI BA 10, which is mounted with UMF light-machine gun platform, and 5 of G-280 CDI BA6 C+R SSA FB6. More will be purchased between 2010 and 2013.

Indonesia
Paspampres (Indonesian Presidential Security forces) are using G 270 CDI for their fleet with SIRINA lights, Gunner Roof Mount, Bullbar, Black Grille, Roof and Rear View Mirror Handles. New model of G 300 CDI in 2010 acquired not less than 30 units for presidential and vice-presidential escort purposes. The Paspampres uses black G 300 CDI with the Military Police in white and ensigns with Indonesian MP insignia.

Iraq
The Kurdish Peshmerga has 60 "Wolf" including 20 lightly armored type to help fight off the ISIL forces.

Ireland
The Irish Army used a number of G-Wagens as ambulances.

Kosovo
The KSF use more than 200. And used by the Kosovo Police which were seized after the Banjska attack.

Latvia
The Latvian Land Forces and Latvian National Guards use different modifications of Geländewagen, including armored. More than 300 of the 240 GD modification were bought from Norway in 2004, with at least 66 later refurbished/upgraded. A small number of the 300GDN variants are also used.

Lebanon
The Lebanese Army operates 20 G-wagon donated by Royal Dutch Army as ambulances.

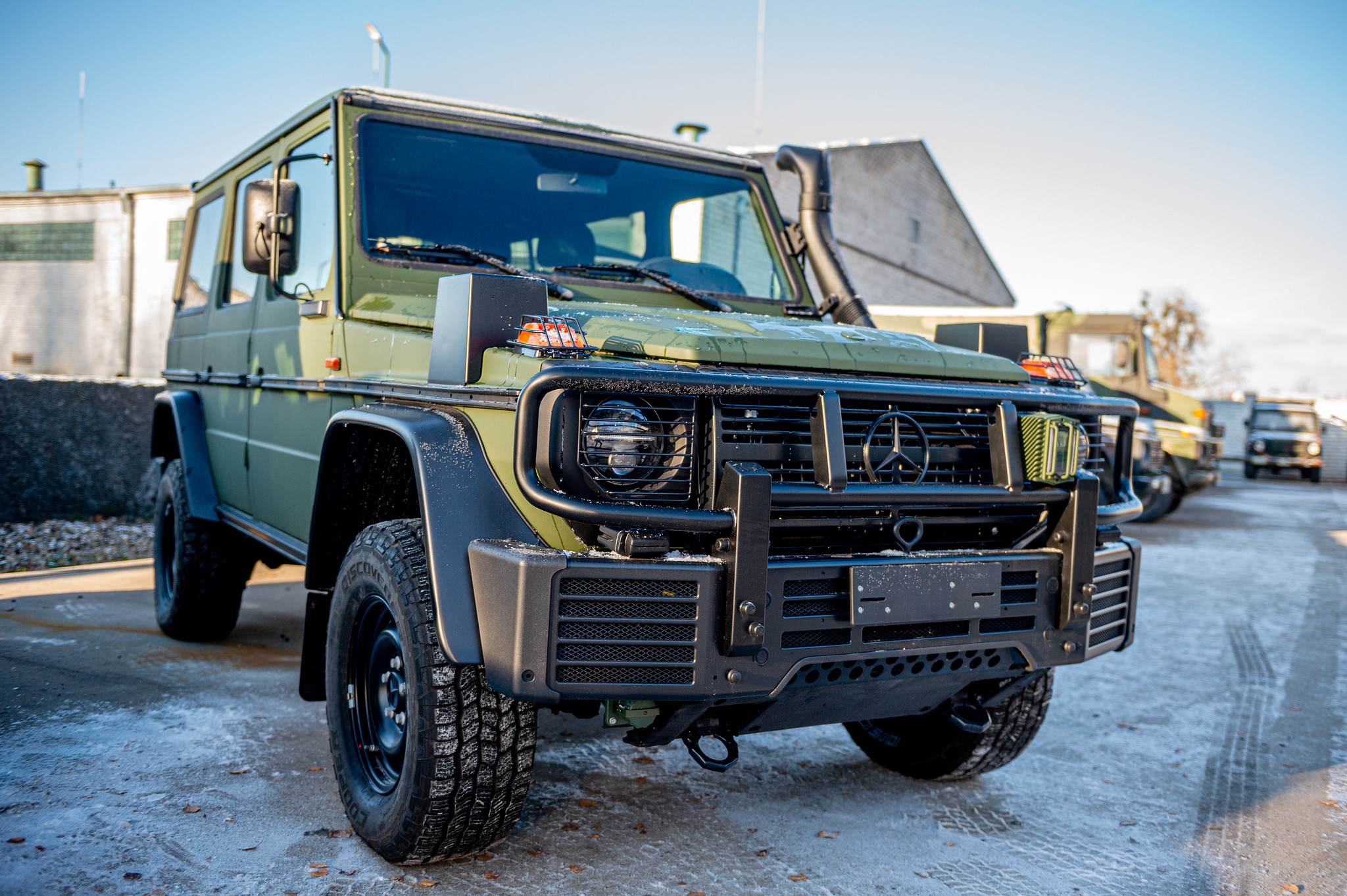
Lithuanian Armed Forces Mercedes-Benz G350

Lithuania
The Lithuanian Armed Forces operates approximately 200 formerly Dutch GD vehicles since delivery in 2016. On December 17, 2021, the National Defence Volunteer Force will receive 125 ex-Dutch GDs for patrolling the land border with Belarus.

Luxembourg
The Military of Luxembourg uses the 300D variant of the Geländewagen.

Malaysia
Locally built by DEFTECH since 2001, the G-Wagon is used along with Land Rover Defender as light transport of Malaysian Army. It uses the GD280 chassis.

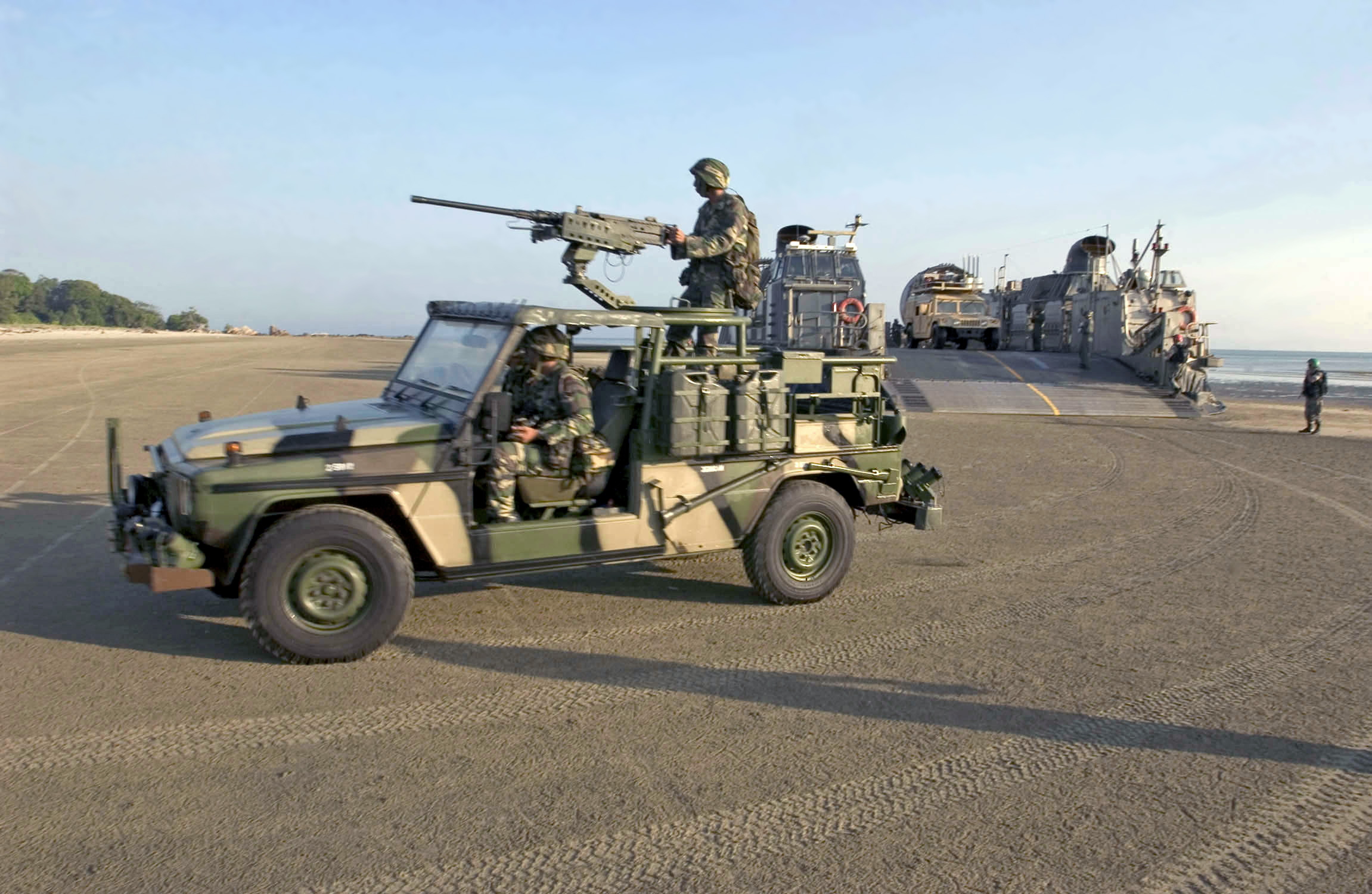
Malaysia Army GD290

Mexico
The Mexican naval defense secretary (SEMAR) announced in 2008, a contract to purchase large numbers of Mercedes-Benz military vehicles for the Mexican Marine corps. As of May 16, 2009 The SEMAR has received 20 of the 84 G-Class vehicles in order.

Mongolia
The Ministry of Defense of Mongolia operates 10 G-class vehicles (Wolf) donated by the German Government in 2010. An additional 60 G-Wolf vehicles were donated by the German Government in 2016.

Netherlands
The Royal Netherlands Army uses various versions of the Mercedes-Benz G-Class, mostly 461 290GD manual gearbox, 290GD TD manual gearbox models and a 280cdi V6 model with automatic gearbox. The Dutch police and Koninklijke Marechaussee also use the G-Class. Most of the police versions are armored 463 models.

North Korea
The Korean People's Army appears to have acquired several 230G(E)-class vehicles, some of which were seen on the Workers' Party of Korea 65th anniversary military parade. At the funeral of Kim Jong-il his hearse was flanked by G-Class vehicles.

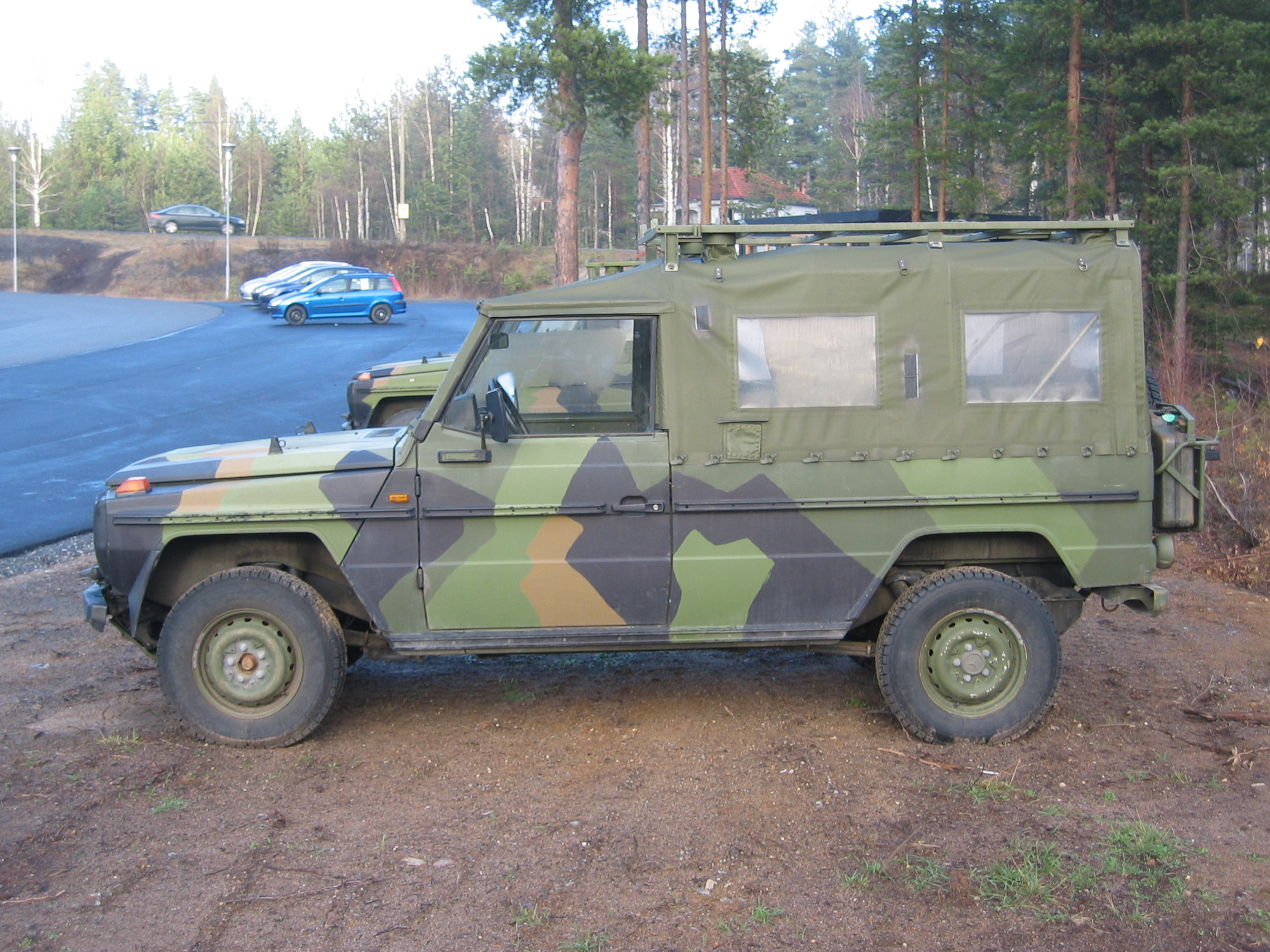
Norwegian military MB240GD

Norway
The Norwegian Army bought 240 GD to replace Volvo and Land Rover 4×4 vehicles in the mid-1980s, and 300 GD to use as ambulances. The 300GD is also used to transport the launch control station and optical sensors for the NASAMS Air-defense system. During the 90's 290 GD's where bought, and in the first half of the 00's a small number of armoured 270 CDI's were put into service. Today the Defence Forces operates a total of 3000 vehicles. The escort company of the Norwegian Royal Guard employs a black G 500 AMG with police lights on the roof. More than 300 of the 240 GD's were sold to Latvia in 2004.

Poland
96 GD 290 and 25 MB290GD WD in service with Wojska Lądowe. 13 GD 290 in service with the Żandarmeria Wojskowa.

Portugal
The Portuguese Marine Corps uses the G-class for light transport along with Toyota Landcruiser and Land Rover Defender 90.

Russia
Police, state security units, military and governmental agencies are using the G-Class. Mostly civilian versions in black. Security escort vehicles for both the President and Prime Minister are black G 500 and G 55 AMG.

Serbia
The Serbian Military currently uses Puch 300GD model. They also uses the following models in 300GD33, 300GD6 and 300GD10 variants, for transport of VIP persons in 300GD3-LUX and 300GD6-LUX and Special Forces Brigade is use modified version designed for access to combat zone.

Singapore
The Singapore Army bought the 270 and 290 versions as secondary military transport. It is used in soft-top truck configuration and is known as a 1.5-tonner or simply "MB" to its users. And also some were used also for patrolling in a "jeep" form. The Army also deploys the extremely short-wheelbase, soft-top version for its Colonels, Battalion COs, Brigade and Division Commanders as personal field transports.

Slovenia
The Military of Slovenia uses Mercedes-Benz G-Class vehicles mainly for transport.

Slovakia
The Armed Forces of Slovak republic uses Mercedes-Benz G-280 CDI in 5th Special Forces Regiment.

Sweden
The Swedish Army uses MB 290/T (1994), MB 290GD (2000) and MB 270 CDI (2005). The GW is to be the main light terrain vehicle in the Swedish armed forces in the future. In 2011 a framework agreement was signed between FMV and Daimler AG. An initial contract for 105 300 CDI was signed.

Switzerland
The Swiss Armed Forces uses the 230 with soft top as the primary general purpose carrier, and a hardtop version as mobile radio access point. It is in service since 1985 and gradually replaced Willys Jeeps, Steyr-Puch Haflinger light transports and Pinzgauer medium transports in the liaison and transport role. All versions in Swiss Army use are unarmed. When it was selected, it was in competition against the Saurer F006 (developed with Monteverdi) or the 230M variant. From 2014, the Steyr Daimler Puch 230 GE is going to be gradually replaced by the Mercedes-Benz G 300 CDI 4x4 hardtop version, starting with a first series of 3,200 vehicles.

Taiwan
The Republic of China Air Force operates G-Classes.

Thailand
Royal Thai Army

United Kingdom
An Argentine Army G-Class captured by the British Army during the Falklands War was subsequently used by No. 18 Squadron RAF in West Germany for several years but is now on display at the Royal Air Force Museum, Cosford The British Commanders'-in-Chief Mission to the Soviet Forces in Germany (BRIXMIS) also used a number.

Ukraine
Police, state security units, military and governmental agencies are using the G-Class. Mostly civilian versions in black. Security escort vehicles for both the President and Prime Minister are black G 500 and G 55 AMG.

United States

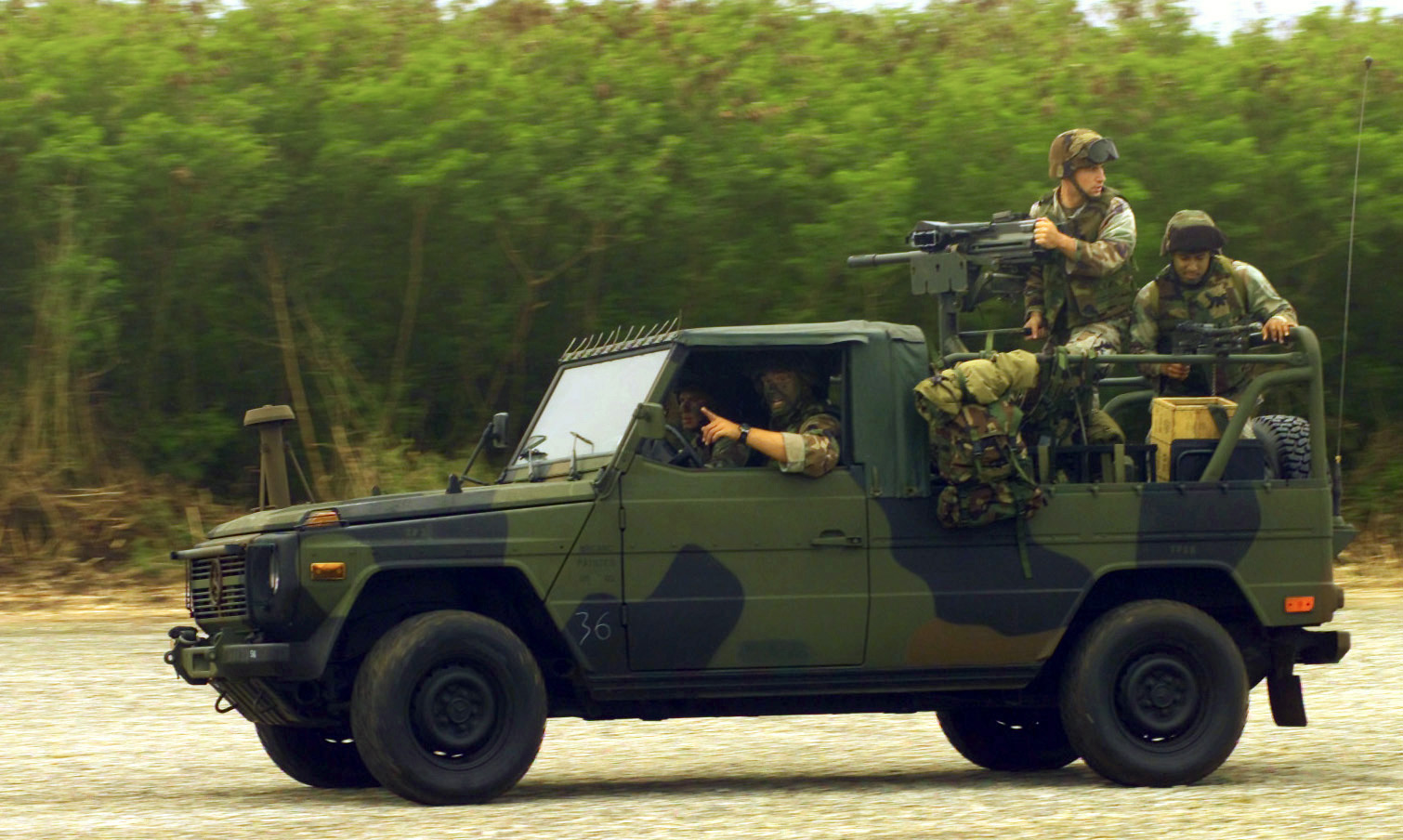
USMC IFAV

The USMC Interim Fast Attack Vehicle (IFAV) is a modified version of the Mercedes-Benz Geländewagen 290. It replaces the modified M-151A2 1/4 ton truck jeep used by the Marines as an FAV in the 1990s. The U.S. Marine Corps acquired 157 of the IFAVs distributed as follows:

- (I) Marine Expeditionary Force (MEF) Camp Pendleton, CA (33)
- (II) MEF Camp Lejeune, NC (25)
- (III) MEF on Okinawa, Japan (27)
- (IV) 17 Force Recon, Afghanistan (22)
- (V) 3 Force Recon Bn, Iraq (23)
- (VI) 1st Provisional DMZ Police Company, Korea (15)
- (VII) various miscellaneous (12)

In the late 1990s the USMC acquired the G-Class model as the Interim Fast Attack Vehicle (IFAV), which was essentially a '97 to '01 DaimlerChrysler model 290 GDT, a diesel-power 2-door with a pick-up bed. This was compact and light enough to be transported inside a Sikorsky CH-53 Sea Stallion Helicopter.

== Bodystyles ==
Code	Bodywork	Wheelbase	Notes
1	Convertible with fixed windshield	2,400 mm (94.5 in)	Only civilian types: 460, 463 and 465 (from late 2026)
2	Van	2,400 mm (94.5 in)	Only 460/461 and military types
3	Station Wagon	2,400 mm (94.5 in)	All types except Professional and Greenline military types
4	Van	2,850 mm (112.2 in)	Only 460/461/Professional/Worker and military types
5	Pickup	2,850 mm (112.2 in)	Only 460/461 types and G 63 6x6 (W463)
6	Station Wagon	2,850 mm (112.2 in)	All types
7	Convertible with folding windshield	2,400 mm (94.5 in)	Only military types
8	Code unused	N/A	N/A
9	Chassis Cab	3,120 mm (122.8 in)	Only 460/461 and military types
9,1	Chassis Cab	3,400 mm (133.9 in)	Only 460/461/Professional and military types
10	Convertible with folding windshield	2,850 mm (112.2 in)	Only military types
11	Chassis Double Cab	3,120 mm (122.8 in)	Only 460/461 and military types
11,1	Chassis Double Cab	3,400 mm (133.9 in)	Only 460/461 and military types
11,2	Chassis Double Cab 6×6	3,400 mm (133.9 in)	Only Greenline military types

US sales figures

- 2023: 10,342
- 2022: 8,697
- 2021: 8,223
- 2020: 5,166
- 2019: 7,348
- 2018: 3,970
- 2017: 4,188
- 2016: 3,950
- 2015: 3,616
- 2014: 3,090
- 2013: 2,494
- 2012: 1,330
- 2011: 1,191
- 2010: 919
- 2009: 662
- 2008: 931
- 2007: 1,152
- 2006: 587
- 2005: 1,334
- 2004: 1,491
- 2003: 1,980
- 2002: 3,114
- 2001: 674

Year	China		
Year	G-class	AMG	EV
2023	5,593	3,974	—
2024	5,258	1863	40
2025	3,890	2,200	151

== Motorsport ==
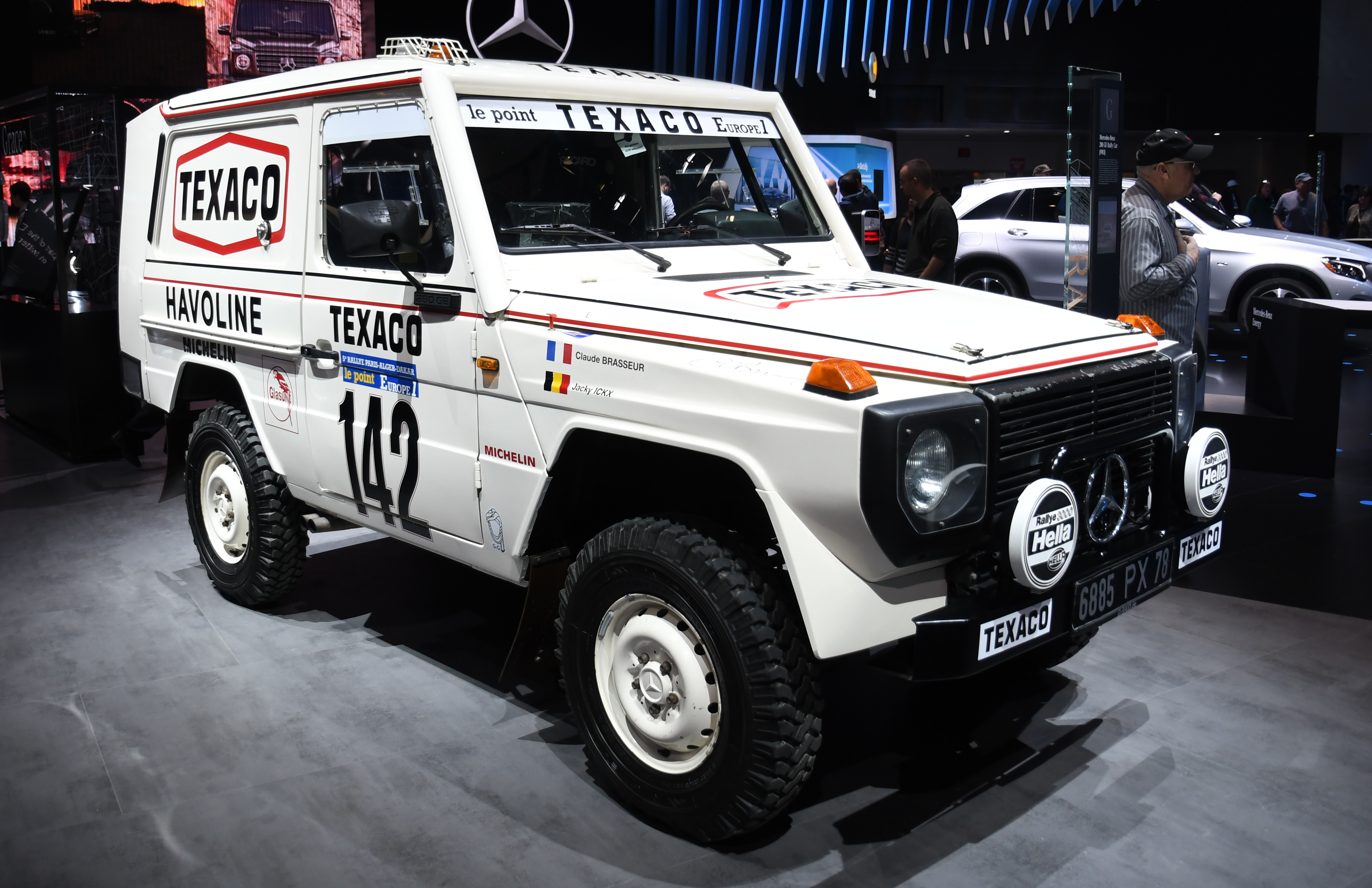
1983 Paris-Dakar winning 280 GE on display at the 2018 North American International Auto Show

In 1983, a specially modified 280 GE won the Paris–Dakar Rally, driven by Jacky Ickx and Claude Brasseur.

== Marketing ==
A specially modified W465 G580e G-Class was announced by Mercedes as the official Trophy Carrier for the 2024 League of Legends World Championship. In addition to a special livery, the car featured a specially designed module designed to safely hold the Summoner's Cup while in transit. The car safely transported the Summoner's Cup to The O2 Arena in London, where the final took place.

== See also ==
- Force Gurkha, Trax - Indian SUVs of similar appearance
- Beijing BJ80 - similar Chinese SUV
- Unimog
