= Kosovo Police =

National law enforcement agency of Kosovo

Kosovo Police: Policia e Kosovës (Albanian) Kosovo Policija or Косово Полиција (Serbian)
- Flag of the Kosovo Police

Agency overview
- Formed: 6 September 1999; 27 years ago
- Employees: 14,048

Jurisdictional structure
- National agency: Kosovo
- Operations jurisdiction: Kosovo
- Area: 10,887 km2
- Population: 1,602,515
- Governing body: Government of Kosovo
- Constituting instrument: Law on the Police
- General nature: Local civilian police

Operational structure
- Overseen by: Ministry of Internal Affairs (Kosovo)
- Headquarters: Rr. Luan Haradinaj, Pristina, Kosovo
- Minister responsible: Xhelal Sveçla (incumbent)
- Agency executive: Fehmi Hoti Acting, Director General

Website
- www.kosovopolice.com/en/

The Kosovo Police (Albanian: Policia e Kosovës; Serbian: Косовска Полиција, romanized: Kosovska Policija) is the law enforcement agency of Kosovo. It was established in 1999 and took its current form with the 2008 police law. It consists of five departments and eight regional directorates and is represented at the political level by the ministry of internal affairs.

== History ==
After the end of the Kosovo War, policing in Kosovo was conducted by the United Nations Interim Administration Mission in Kosovo (UNMIK) and KFOR. According to the UN Security Council Resolution 1244, UNMIK had a mandate to establish a new police force in Kosovo, and in the meantime, to maintain civil law and order.

The predecessor of the Kosovo Police, the Kosovo Police Service (KPS; Albanian: Shërbimi Policor i Kosovës) was established on 6 September 1999, with the admission of the first 176 cadets of the KPS into the Police School of Vushtrria. The school was renovated by the Organization for Security and Co-operation in Europe (OSCE), which additionally trained the first cadets, establishing a training regime based on Western standards. KPS was subordinated to UNMIK and the UNMIK police commissioner retained command authority over both the international police and KPS. Its name was chosen by the first international police commissioner in Kosovo, Sven Frederiksen.

In February 2008, after Kosovo declared its independence, the force became a governmental agency of the Government of the Republic of Kosovo and was renamed the Kosovo Police (KP; Albanian: Policia e Kosovës). The Kosovo Police is overseen by Kosovo's Ministry of the Interior (Kosovo) and its mandate is regulated by the Constitution and the law on police.

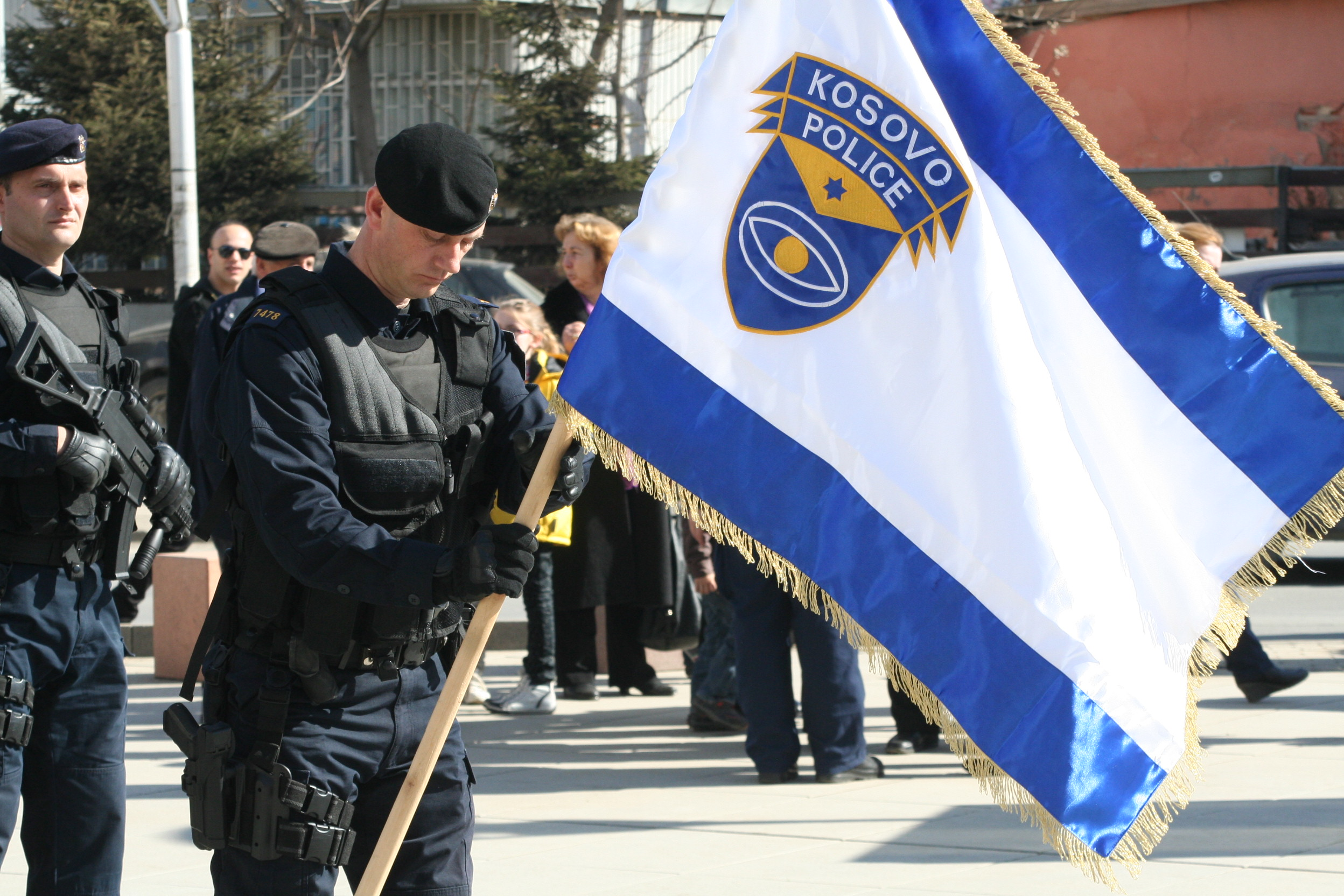
A member of the Kosovo Police holds the flag of the agency.

The Kosovo Police has grown steadily since 1999, and in 2004 reached its planned full size of nearly 7,000 officers. As of 2018, it had around 8,721 employees, with roughly 8,000 of them being police officers, and the remainder either civilian staff or police cadets. The police aims to represent the ethnic representation of the population it serves, with ethnic minorities (Serbs, Bosniaks, Roma, Turks, and Gorani) making up about 10% of its membership, with the remaining 90% being ethnic Albanians.

In November 2022, during the 2022–2023 North Kosovo crisis, around 300 Serb policemen in the north of Kosovo resigned en masse as a form of protest against the ban on Serbian car plates by the Kosovo Government, leaving the north with effectively no active police force. The Kosovo government reacted by temporarily replacing the resignees with Albanian policemen, which resulted in protests by the local Serb population. The Kosovo Police responded by opening a call for applications for ethnic minorities to replace the resignees.

== Organization and Structure ==
The agency is headed by its director general, who is appointed by the prime minister. The director general serves a five-year term. He appoints the directors of each of the five departments of the police, as well as the directors of the eight regional directorates of the police.

The agency consists of five departments: the Department of Operations, the Investigation Department, the Border Department, the Department of Support Services, and the Human Resources Department.

=== Department of Operations ===
The Department of Operations is the main department of the Kosovo Police and employs the bulk of its members. It is headed by the director of the Department of Operations and consists of three divisions: The Division of Public Safety, the Road Traffic Division, and the Specialized Units Division. The first two form the backbone of the Kosovo Police and deal with issues such as general policing operations, prevention of petty crime, community policing, and road safety. The specialized units support the other two divisions, and they additionally engage in close-protection to VIPs and diplomats, protection of objects with special importance, anti-terrorism operations, and riot control.

==== Division of Public Safety ====
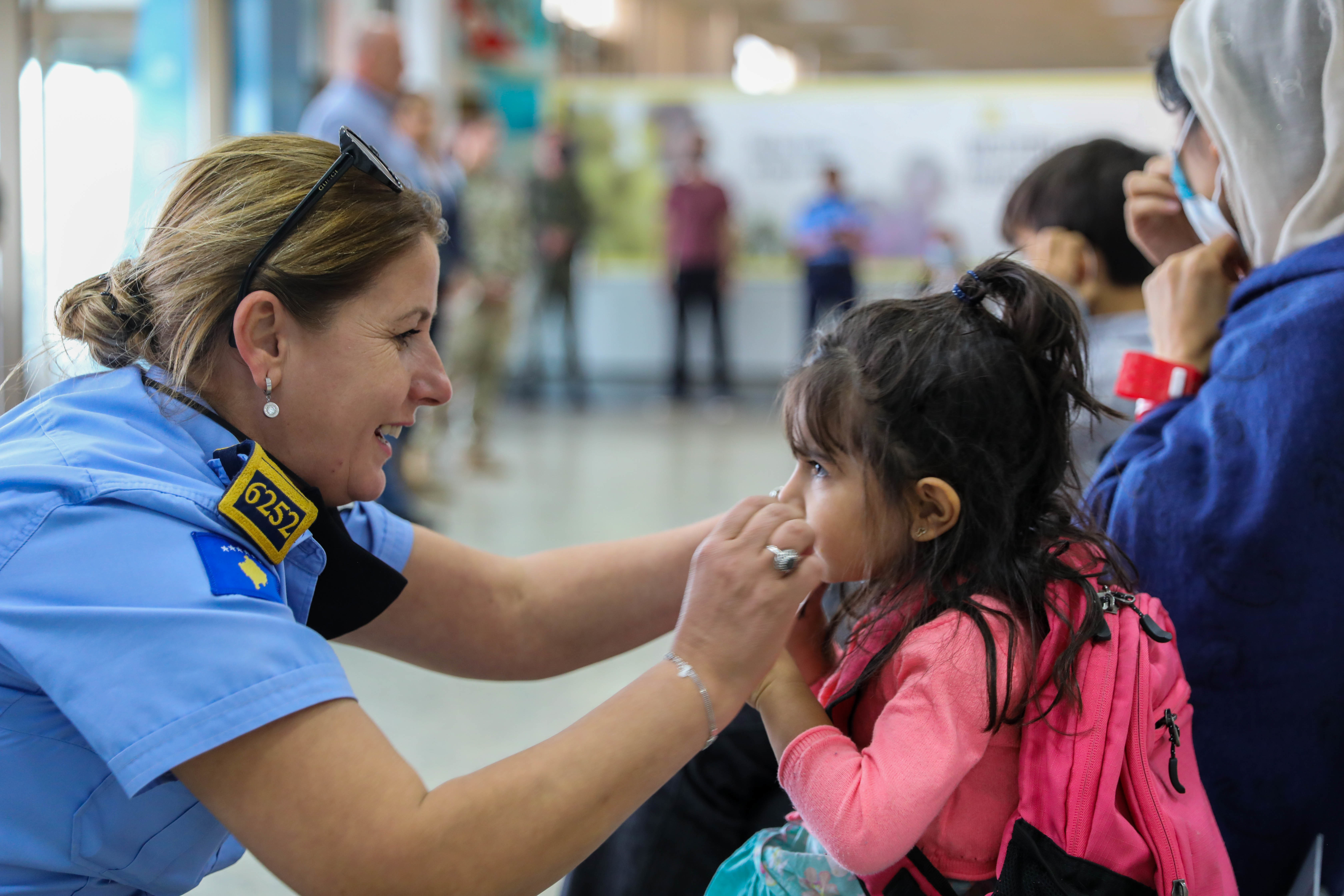
A member of the Kosovo Police helps an Afghan child after her arrival at the Pristina International Airport.

The Division of Public Safety is part of the Department of Operations and consists of eight regional directorates of the Police and 40 police stations. The regional directorates are headed by a director, who is appointed by the director general. The only exception is in the north of Kosovo, where Kosovo Serbs form a local majority; there, since the 2013 Brussels Agreement, the regional director is appointed by the Interior Minister, after a joint proposal of candidates by the mayors of North Mitrovica, Zubin Potok, Zvečan and Leposavić. The forty police stations are headed by station commanders, who are also appointed by the director general. The eight regional directorates are: RD Pristina, RD Gjilan, RD Ferizaj, RD Prizren, RD Gjakova, RD Peja, RD Mitrovica-South and RD Mitrovica-North.

The main duties of the Division of Public Safety involve the planning and execution of operations related to general public safety. They conduct patrols, provide security in sports and other cultural events, compile standard operational procedures, engage with the community to build trust, deal with issues related to violence among minors and domestic violence, and are usually the first responders to crime scenes.

==== Road Traffic Division ====
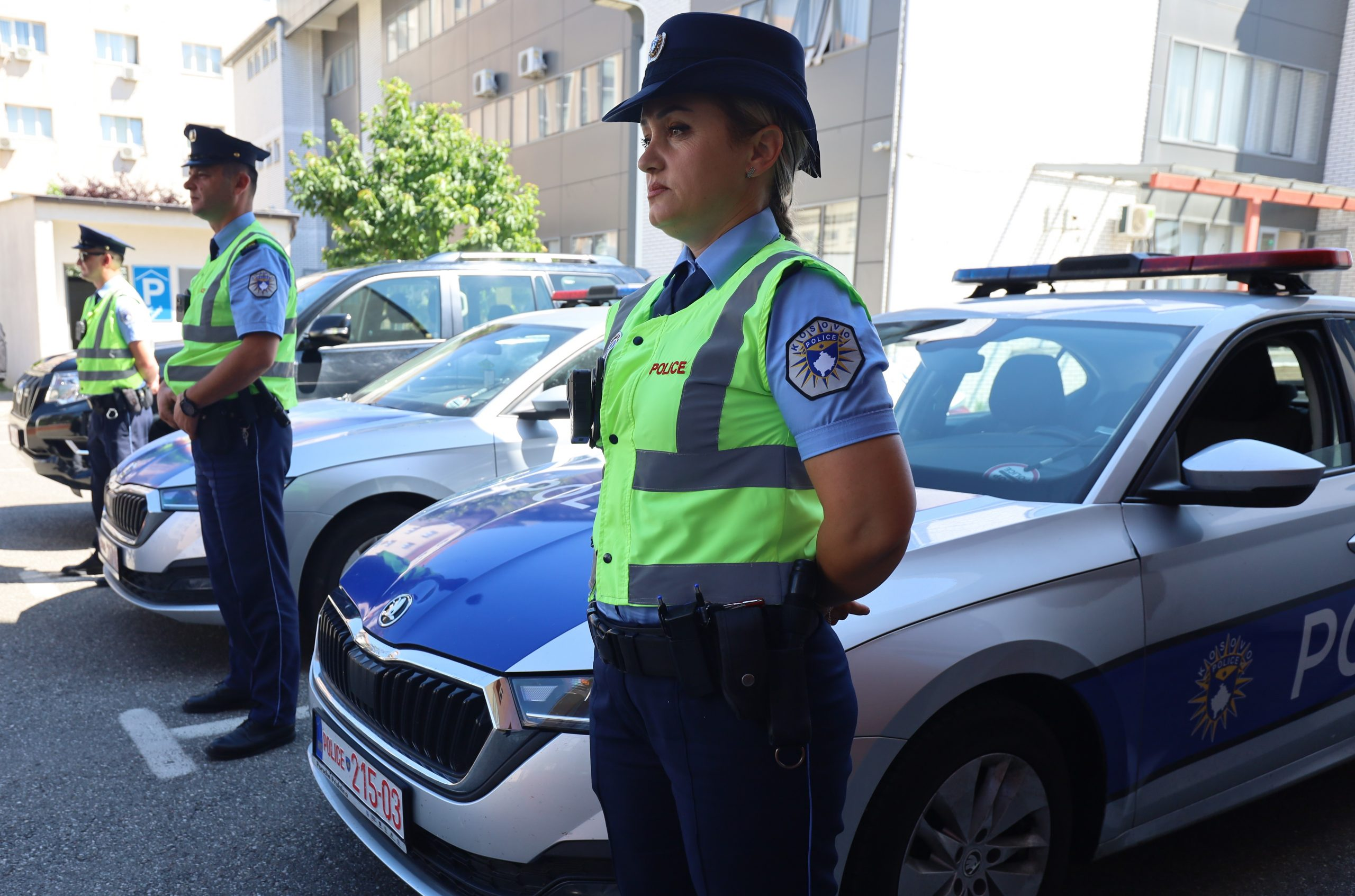
Members of the Kosovo Police Road Traffic Division.

The Road Traffic Division is responsible for general traffic safety. They conduct patrols and attempt to prevent road accidents by enforcing the traffic laws, escort the transportation of hazardous materials, monitor the highways, and they are the first responders in case of traffic accidents. They additionally inspect the road infrastructure and make recommendations to the local and national authorities with regards to improvements that would reduce the possibility of accidents.

==== Division of Specialized Units ====
The Division of Specialized Units is the third division of the Department of Operations of the Kosovo Police. It includes the Special Operations Unit, the Special Interventions Unit, the K-9 Unit, the Unit for Treatment of Explosives, and the Directorate for Securing of Objects with Special Importance and Personalities. Specialized units conduct tasks such as close protection for Kosovo leaders, diplomats, and other VIPs, antiterrorist operations, detainment of high-risk persons, as well as crowd control and assisting other police departments and units.

===== Special Operations Unit (SOU/NjSO) =====
The Special Operations Unit (SOU; Albanian: Njësia Speciale Operative) of the Kosovo Police is the largest specialized unit of the agency and it conducts special operations in the whole territory of Kosovo, as needed. The SOU is responsible for maintaining public order in gatherings and protests, controlling riots, arresting high-risk criminals, as well as fighting criminal organizations in the whole territory of Kosovo.

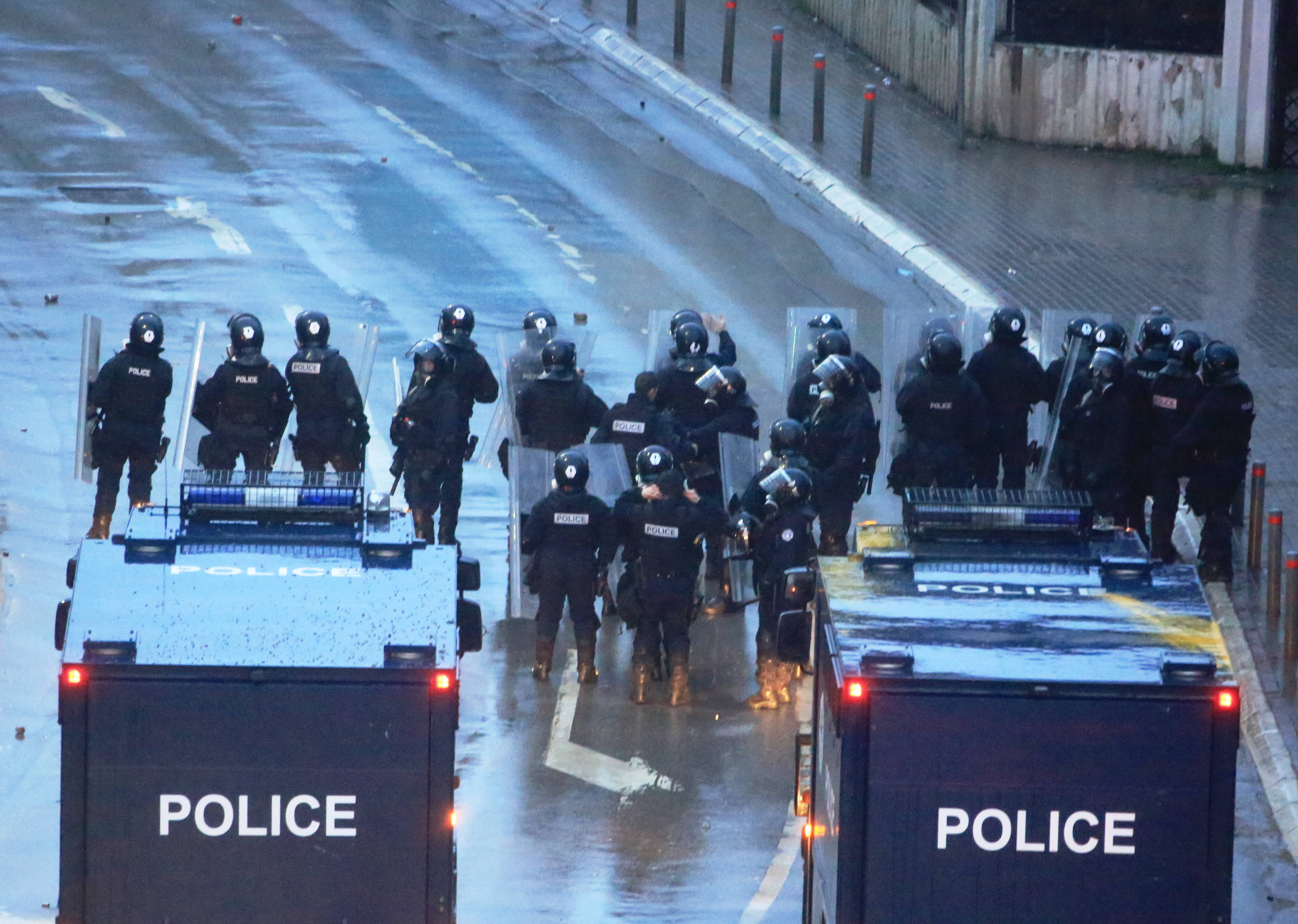
Kosovo Police's Special Operations Unit conducting riot control during a demonstration.

SOU has its origins in the Regional Street Crimes Unit (RSCU) which first began operating in 2002 in the Pristina region. It was created and led by CIVPOL Chief Angel G.Queipo, and Deputy Chief Jim Renfrow of the United States, who trained the unit to undertake undercover operations, narcotics interdiction, medium-risk arrest warrants, and public disorder management. CIVPOL Chief Jim Renfrow led the unit until the end of his CIVPOL mission in late 2003 and was then replaced by Peter Willig from Germany. RSCU was commanded by the Pristina Regional Commander from UNMIK, Superintendent Paul Hamlin (Northern Ireland).

Afterwards, the name was changed to the Regional Operational Support Units (ROSU), and a separate ROSU unit was placed in each of the then-seven regional directorates of Kosovo. The idea was to operate each unit as a separate "troop" with a commander reporting to the mission commander similar to how the State Police operate in the United States. Following Kosovo's declaration of independence, the ROSU units were centralized and the Special Operations Unit was established.

===== Special Intervention Unit (SIU/NjSI) =====
The Special Intervention Unit (SIU; Albanian: Njësia Speciale Intervenuese) is a highly-specialized unit, known for its military-style uniforms and discipline. The unit engages in hostage rescue, anti-terror operations, arresting of dangerous criminals, and fighting of criminal organizations throughout the territory of Kosovo.

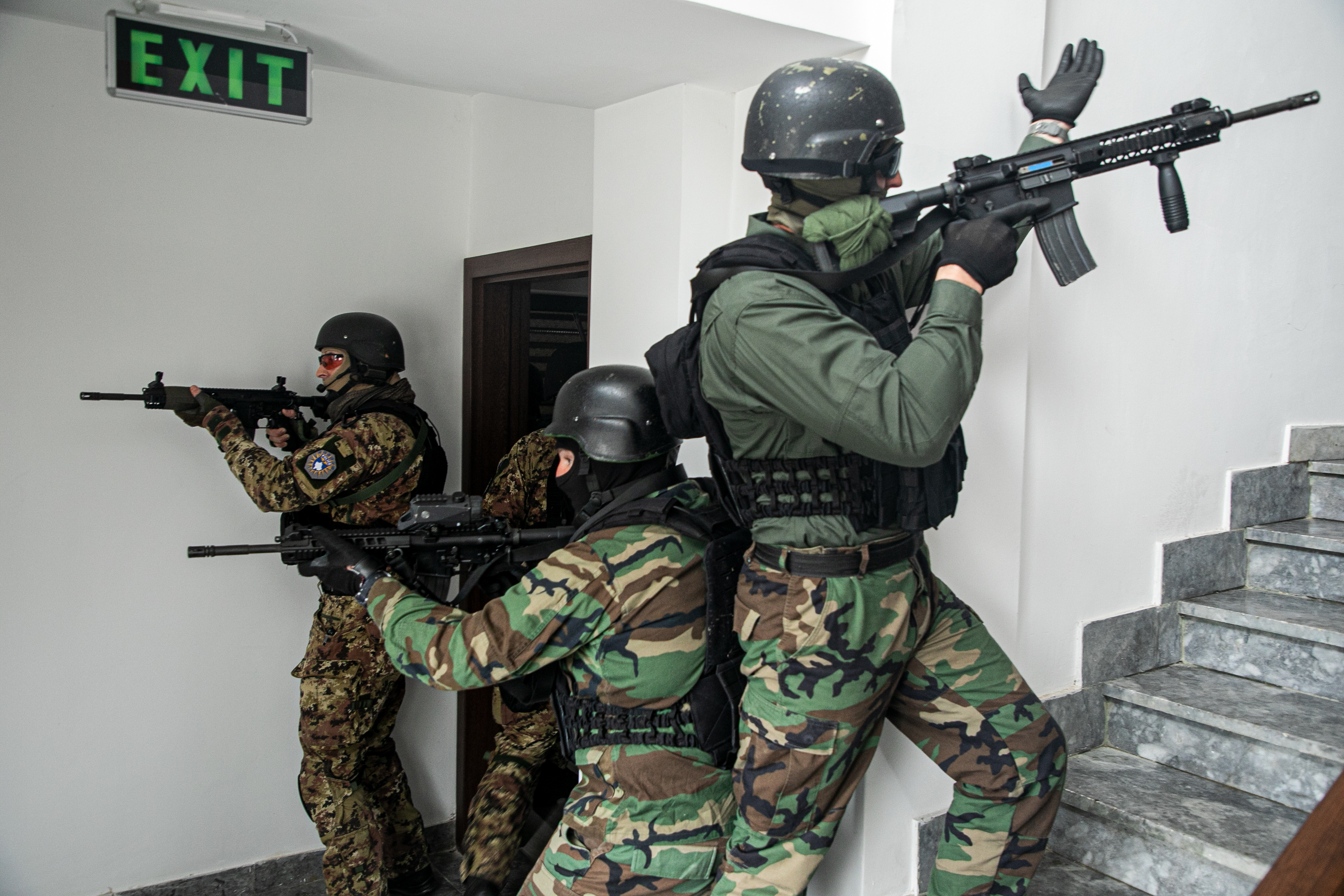
Members of the Special Interventions Unit during a building-clearing exercise.

SIU was created in 2003. Initially, it consisted of two SWAT units consisting of 15 officers each, who were trained by two American contractors. In March 2005 the SWAT teams were formalized via the launch of the "Special Intervention Group/SIG" (Albanian: Grupi Special i Intervenimit/GSI) project. In the first new recruitment batch, only 18 trainees were selected among hundreds of applicants. SIG was equipped, coached, and trained by a team of UNMIK professional specialised instructors from France, Egypt, Germany, Bulgaria, the US, and Denmark. The unit was reformed in September 2006 and by April 2007 it was renamed to the First Intervention Team (FIT). After Kosovo's declaration of independence, the unit was renamed the Special Intervention Unit (SIU).

SIU was involved in the Banjska attack on 24 September 2023, in which its troops neutralized an armed group that had earlier murdered a sergeant of the Public Safety Division during a patrol.

===== K-9 Unit =====
The K-9 (canine) unit is a small specialized unit within the Department of Operations that engages in patrol, narcotics detection, and explosives detection. The unit reports to the central police command and it often coordinates its actions with the Border Police.

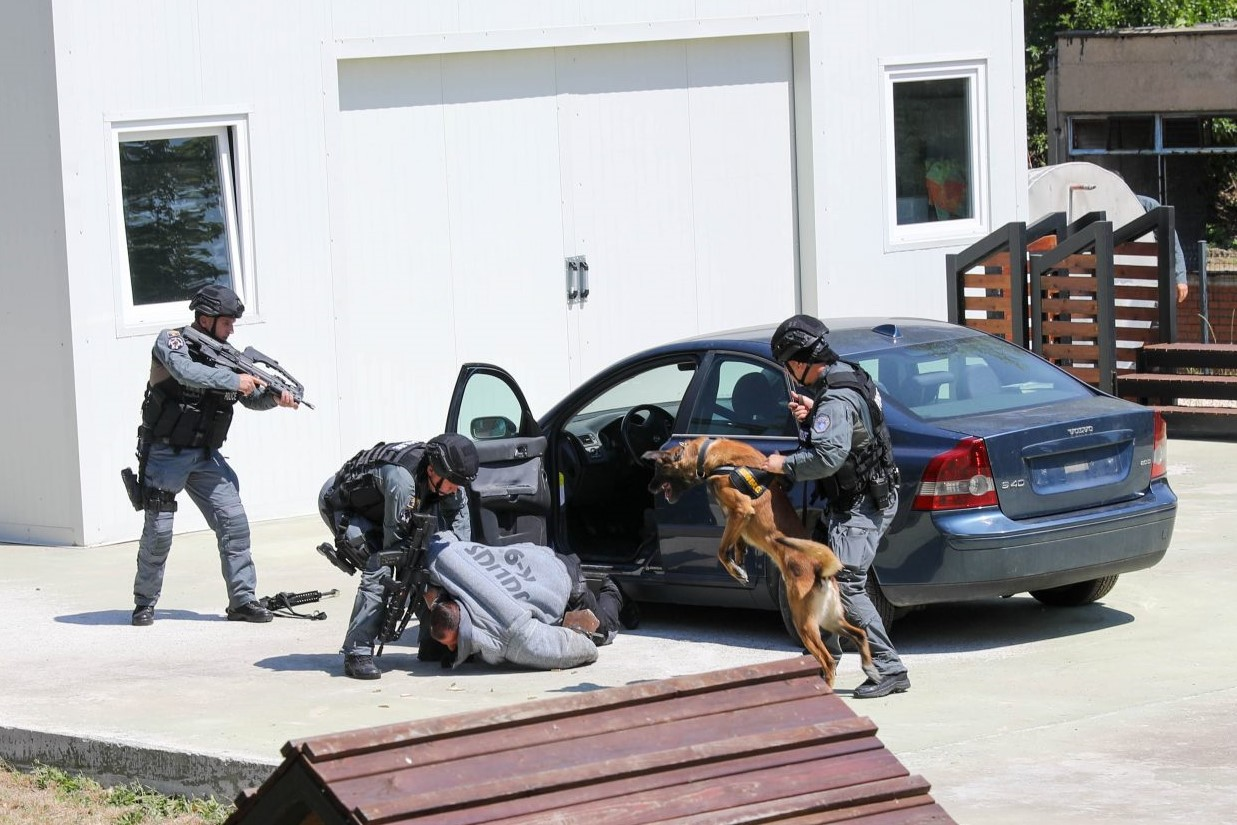
The K-9 Unit during a training session

The unit was established in November 2002. Initially it had five operators for patrolling, but in 2003 it was expanded as a unit with five more operators. Officers completed their basic training in Great Britain and developed their skills under the monitoring of international instructors.

===== Unit for Treatment of Explosives =====
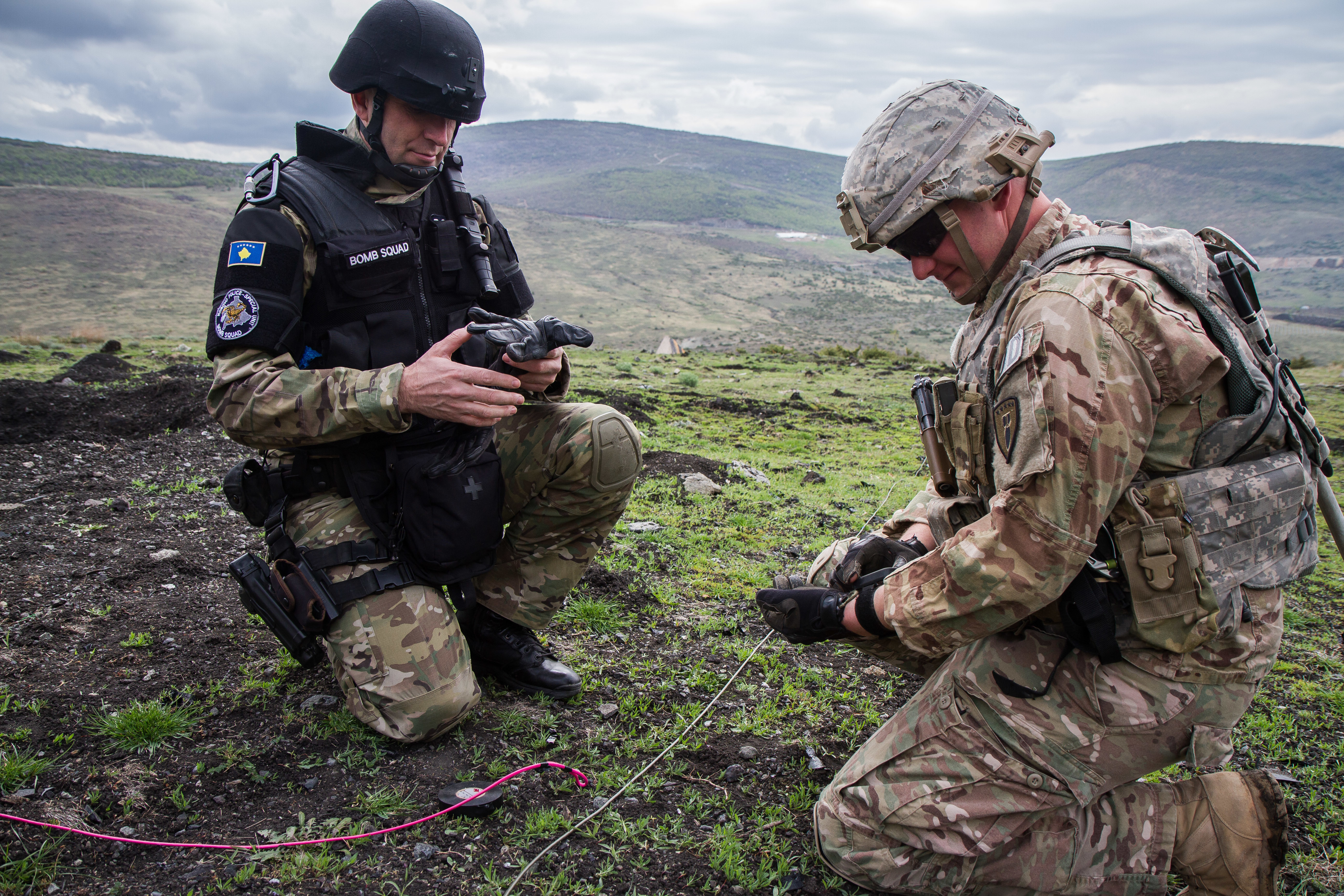
U.S. Army Staff Sgt. assists a member of the Kosovo Police Bomb Squad with the detonation cord for a demolition range in Rahovec.

The Unit for Treatment of Explosives is part of the Department of Operations and responds to calls from all 8 of Kosovo's Regional Police Directorates. The unit specializes in responding to cases of bomb threats, the threat by chemical and biological weapons, disposing of bombs, investigating post-blast scenes, conducting searches in high-risk facilities, compiling expert reports for courts, as well as assisting other specialized units in their operations. The unit additionally closely cooperates with investigation units and the prosecutor's office in the course of post-blast investigations, bomb threats, and during the arrest of persons who possess illegal explosive devices. The unit was established in 2006.

===== Directorate for Securing of Objects with Special Importance and Personalities =====
The Close Protection Unit within the Kosovo Police was established in December 1999. After the declaration of Kosovo's independence in 2008, the unit's functions were expanded significantly. As a result, the Directorate for Securing of Objects with Special Importance and Personalities (DSOSIP) was established and the Close Protection Unit became a part of it.

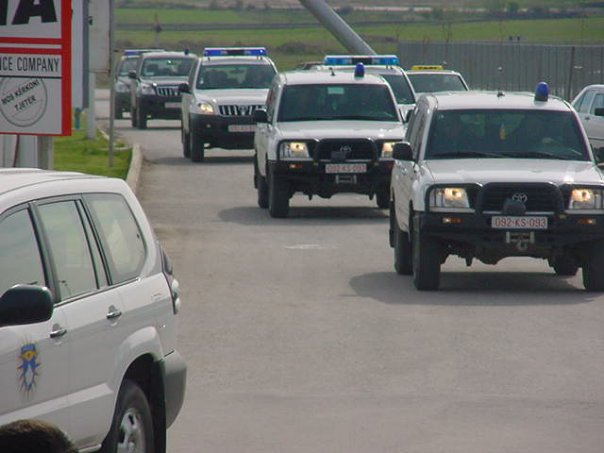
The Close Protection Unit

Today, the Directorate for Securing of Objects with Special Importance and Personalities consists of the Security Unit of Presidency-Assembly-Government, the Close Protection Unit, the Unit for Securing of Ministerial and Presidential Objects, the Unit for Securing of Police Objects, the Unit for Securing of Diplomatic Objects, and the Unit for Securing of objects of Cultural and Religious Heritage.

The units of the directorate provide personal protection to the president, prime minister, speaker of assembly, government buildings, embassies based in Kosovo, as well as objects of cultural or religious importance.

The Close Protection Unit also undertakes tactical operations, escorting delegations, and evacuations of both international staff and Kosovo Police officers.

=== Department of Investigations ===
The Department of Investigations is one of the five departments of the agency, tasked with law enforcement, the combating of organized crime and corruption. The department is headed by the director of the Department of Investigations. Its specific tasks include the combating of organized crime and corruption, fighting violent extremism and terrorism, collecting evidence for courts, as well as cooperating with international agencies and exchanging information related to international criminal persons and groups.

The department consists of three divisions: the Crime Investigation Division, the Division Against Organized Crime, and the Anticorruption Task Force.

==== The Crime Investigation Division ====
The Crime Investigation Division is one of the divisions of the Department of Investigations that covers all issues related to crime. It consists of five directorates: the Directorate for Investigation of Serious Crimes, the Directorate for Investigation of Economic Crime and Corruption, the Directorate Against Terrorism, the Directorate for Intelligence and Analysis, and the Directorate for Forensics.

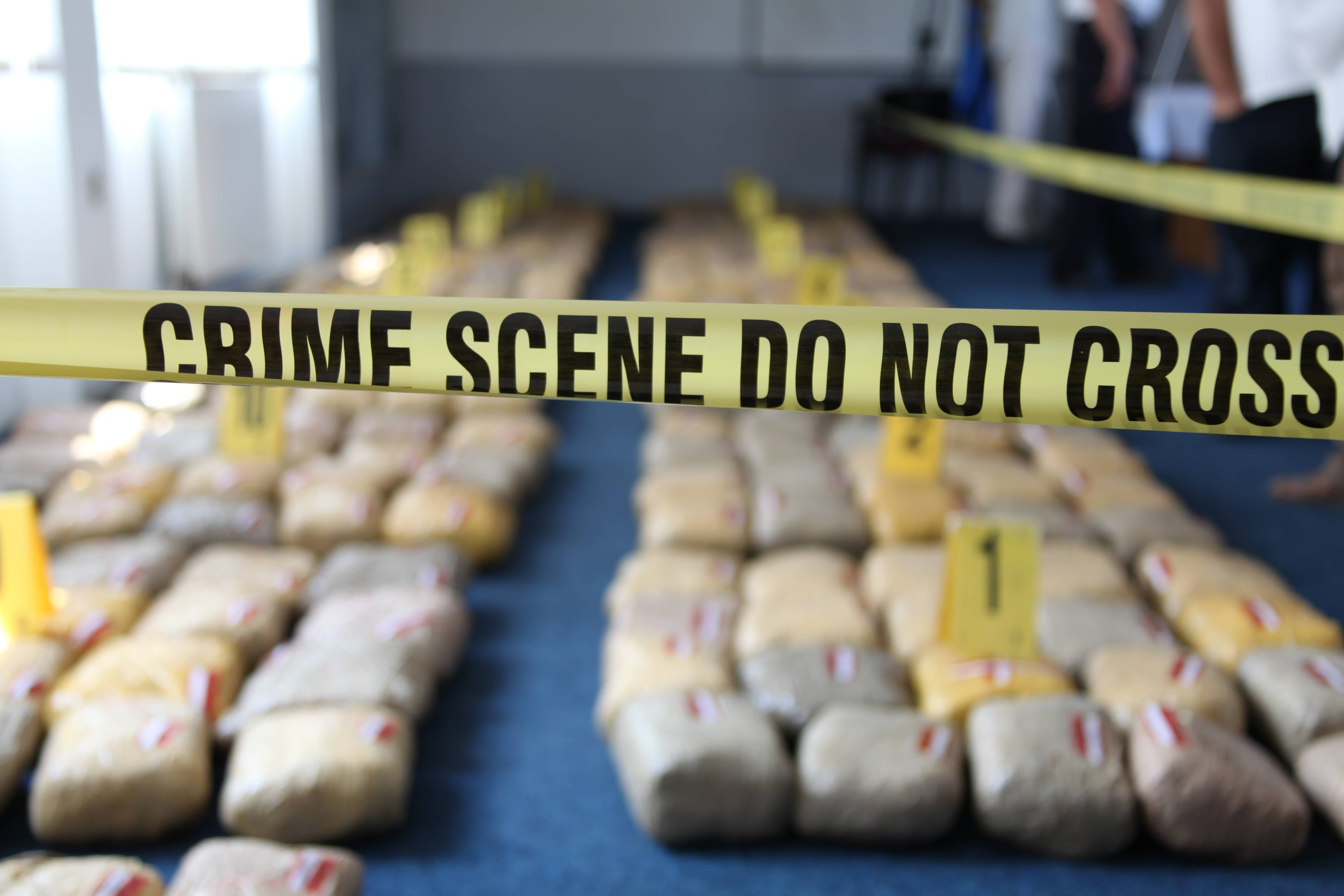
Narcotics confiscated by the Kosovo Police.

The five directorates deal with the investigation of criminal offences against the life and property of other persons, the finding of traces at crime scenes, damage to the environment, offences against the law and the constitutional order of Kosovo, war crimes, collection of intelligence, prevention of terrorist acts by disabling terrorist organizations, and cooperation with other departments of the agency and other agencies in Kosovo and abroad.

==== Division Against Organized Crime ====
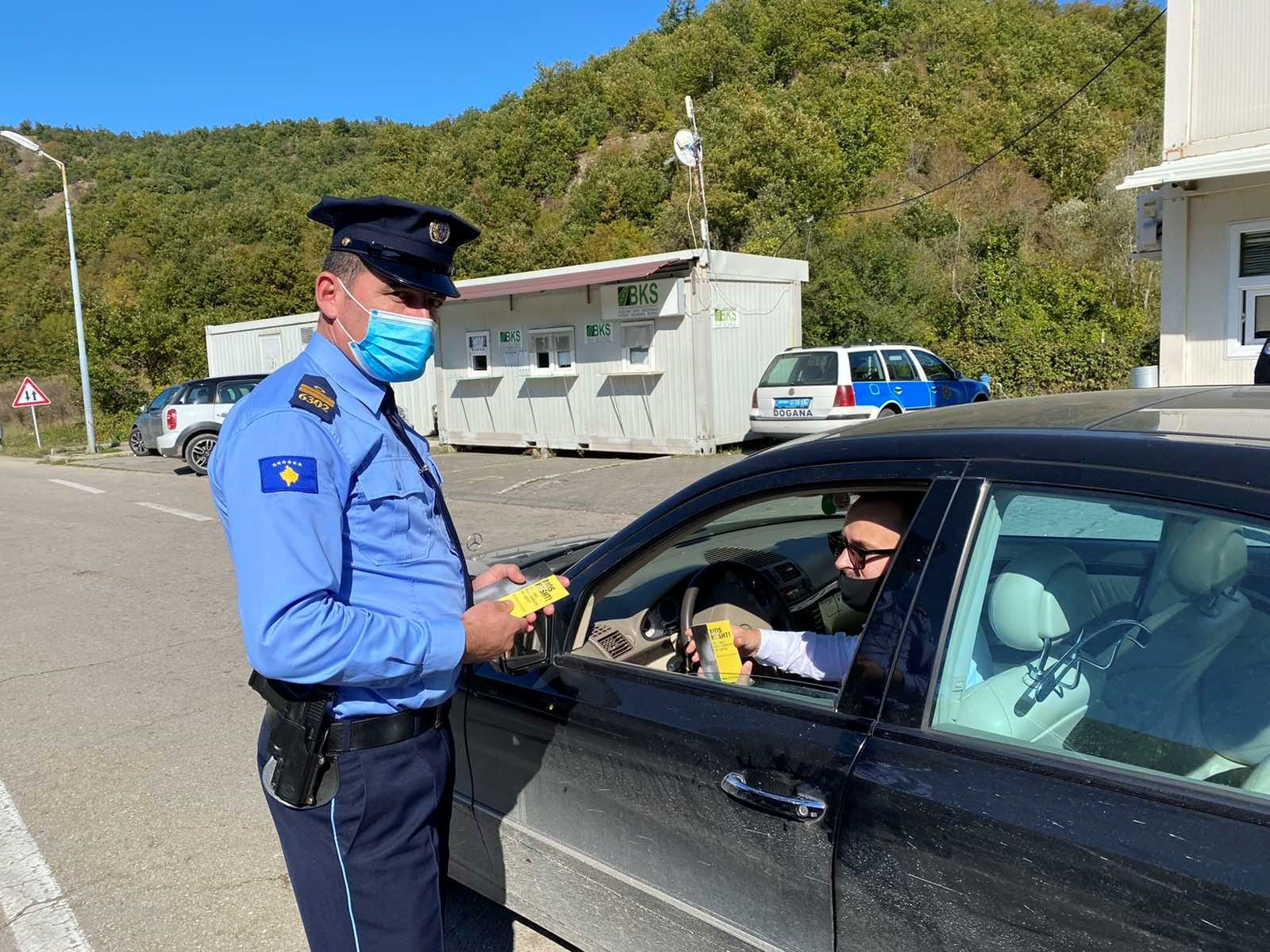
Kosovo Police officer talking to a driver during an awareness campaign related to human trafficking.

The Division Against Organized Crime is part of the Department of Investigations and consists of four directorates: the Directorate for the Investigation of Organized Crime, the Directorate for the Investigation of Trafficking with Narcotics, the Directorate for the Investigation of Trafficking with Human Beings, and the Directorate for Investigation Support.

The main tasks of the division are related to the prevention and combating of offences related to organized crime, intimidation of witnesses, smuggling of migrants, smuggling of weapons, piracy, kidnappings, cyber-crimes, unauthorized distribution of confidential information, distribution of narcotics, trafficking of human organs, and human trafficking.

==== Anticorruption Task Force ====
The Anticorruption Task force is a specialized division of the Department of Investigations that treats cases of misuse of public office. It is an investigative division that directly assists the Special Prosecution of the Republic of Kosovo on crimes of financial character and corruption.

=== Border Department ===
The Border Department is responsible for controlling and surveying the borders of the Republic of Kosovo. The department is headed by the director of the Border Department. At the national level, it consists of the Division for Controlling and Surveillance of the Borders, and the Division for Integrated Border Management. At the local level, it additionally includes the Regional Border Directorate "West", which is responsible for four border crossings with Albania and three with Montenegro; the Regional Border Directorate "North", which supervises four border crossings with Serbia; and the Regional Border Directorate "East", which manages two border crossings with Serbia and two with North Macedonia.

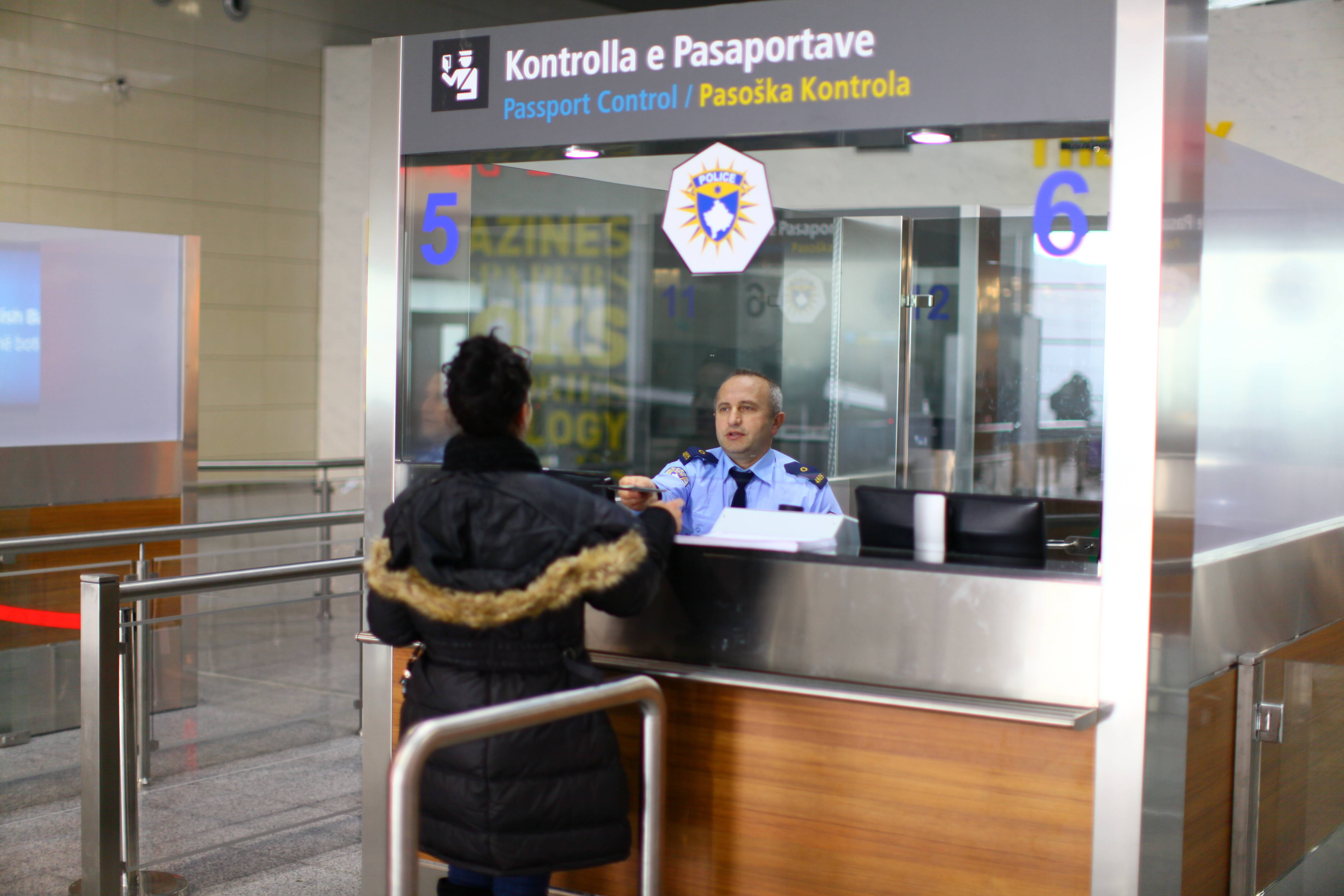
A border officer checking a traveler's passport at Prishtina International Airport

The Border Department strives to ensure the free movement of people, goods, and services, and to prevent cross-border crime. It cooperates with other departments of the agency and with international agencies and institutions. It makes risk assessments and its work mainly consists of observing and monitoring border crossings, and reacting when needed.

Kosovo has common border-crossing points with Albania and North Macedonia, meaning that citizens crossing the border are only legitimized once. The Border Department is also responsible for legitimizing travelers at the Pristina International Airport.

=== Department of Support Services ===
The Department of Support Services is one of the five departments of the agency. It is headed by the director of Support Services.

=== Human Resources Department ===
The Human Resources Department is the fifth department of the agency. Headed by the director of the Human Resources Department, it is responsible for the hiring and training of police officers. The department is made of two divisions: UNMIK Police's first Director of Personnel was Chris Boyd (Northern Ireland) who took over from Vihar Cherkezov (Bulgaria) who had previously been Chief of Personnel and one of the first officers to establish the UNMIK mission alongside Commissioner Frederiksen. The Division of Personnel and Administration, and the Training Division. It additionally includes the Commission for Review of the Use of Force, which is responsible for management and administration of the cases of use of physical force by the police officers.

==== Division of Personnel and Administration ====
The Division of Personnel and Administration is tasked with identifying recruitment needs, recruitment and hiring of new police officers, monitoring of training programs, identification of the need for promotion in ranks, support of police officers in issues related to mental and physical health, the general welfare of all police officers, and the managing the central archive of the agency.

The division consists of four directorates, which are the Directorate of Personnel, the Directorate for Development of Performance and Career, the Directorate for Internal Services, and the Directorate for Health Services.

==== Training Division ====
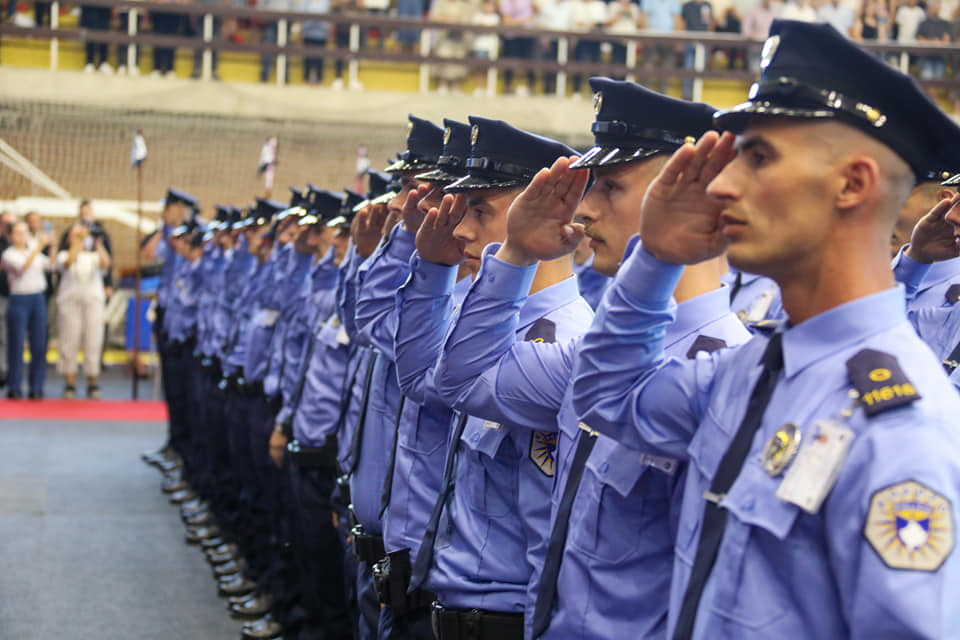
The graduation of the cadets of the 58th generation of the Kosovo Police Academy in 2023.

The Training Division is responsible for the creation of curriculum for training programs according to the needs of the agency, the development of contemporary teaching methods, and cooperation with police academies abroad. It consists of the Directorate for Training Support, the Directorate for Mandatory Training, and the Directorate for Specialized and Advanced Training.

== Police Inspectorate of Kosovo ==
The Police Inspectorate of Kosovo is an institution that supervises the operations of Kosovo Police and seeks to provide an accountable, democratic, and transparent police service, in accordance with the law and other required standards. It investigates criminal offences conducted by police officers, as well as violations of operating standards and laws by the institution as a whole. The inspectorate can take action against any member of the Kosovo Police, including the higher executives. The inspectorate is headed by its chief executive officer, who is appointed by, and accountable to, the Minister of Interior of Kosovo.

== Interpol membership ==
In November 2018 Kosovo's application to join Interpol received 68 votes in favor, 51 against, and 16 countries abstained, even though the Kosovo Police fulfilled the technical criteria to join the international organization that facilitates international police cooperation. Kosovo accused Serbia for lobbying against its application to join the organization and retaliated against Serbia with 100% tariffs on imported goods.

== Equipment ==
=== Firearms ===
Model	Image	Caliber	Origin	Note
Pistols
Glock 19x9		9×19mm Parabellum	Austria	The compact version of the Glock 17
Submachine guns and machine guns
MP7		HK 4.6×30mm	Germany	
MP5		9×19mm Parabellum	Germany	
SIG MPX-K		9×19mm Parabellum	United States	
HK UMP		9×19mm Parabellum	Germany	
HK MG4		5.56×45mm NATO	Germany	
M60		7.62×51mm NATO	United States	
M2A1		12.7×99mm NATO (.50 BMG)	United States	
Assault rifles and carbines
VHS 2		5.56×45mm NATO	Croatia	Used by the Rapid Intervention Unit
SIG M400		5.56×45mm NATO	Germany	
HK G36		5.56×45mm NATO	Germany	Also the G36-C variant
HK 416		5.56×45mm NATO	Germany	
MPT-55		5.56×45mm NATO	Turkey	
Barrett REC7di		5.56×45mm NATO	United States	
HK 417		7.62×51mm NATO	Germany	
AK-47		7.62×39mm	Soviet Union	
AKM		7.62×39mm	Soviet Union	
MPi-KM		7.62×39mm	East Germany	
ASH-78		7.62×39mm	Albania	
Zastava M70		7.62×39mm	Yugoslavia	
SIG 516		5.56×45mm NATO; 7.62×51mm NATO	United States	Also the SIG 716 G2 variant
Shotguns
Mossberg 535			United States	
Remington 870			United States	
Benelli M4			Italy	
Sniper rifles
Sako TRG-42		.300 Winchester Magnum.338 Lapua Magnum	Finland	
Sako TRG M10		.300 Winchester Magnum.338 Lapua Magnum	Finland	
Remington M700		7.62×51mm NATO	United States	
Barrett MRAD		.300 Winchester Magnum.338 Lapua Magnum	United States	Used by the Special Intervention Unit
BT APR		.300 Winchester Magnum.338 Lapua Magnum	Switzerland	
CZ TSR		7.62×51mm NATO	Czech Republic	
Huglu Ovis B08		.300 Winchester Magnum.338 Lapua Magnum	Turkey	
Barrett M82		12.7×99mm NATO (.50 BMG)	United States	Used by the Special Intervention Unit
Grenade launchers
M203		40×46 mm	United States	
HK 169		40×46 mm	Germany	
VHS BG		40×46 mm	Croatia	
RBG 6		40×46 mm	Croatia	
NR GLM40		40×46 mm	Turkey	

=== Vehicles ===
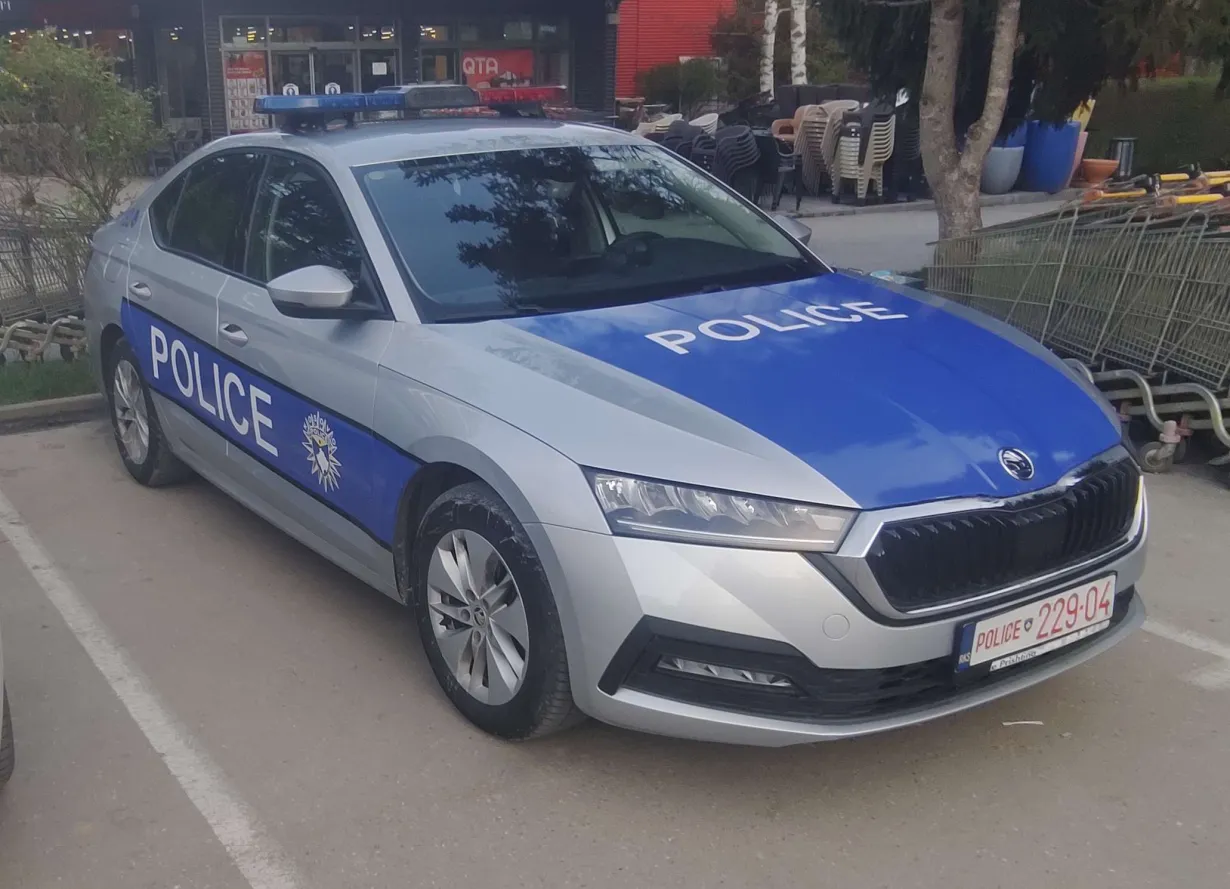
The Škoda Octavia, primarily used for patrol duties

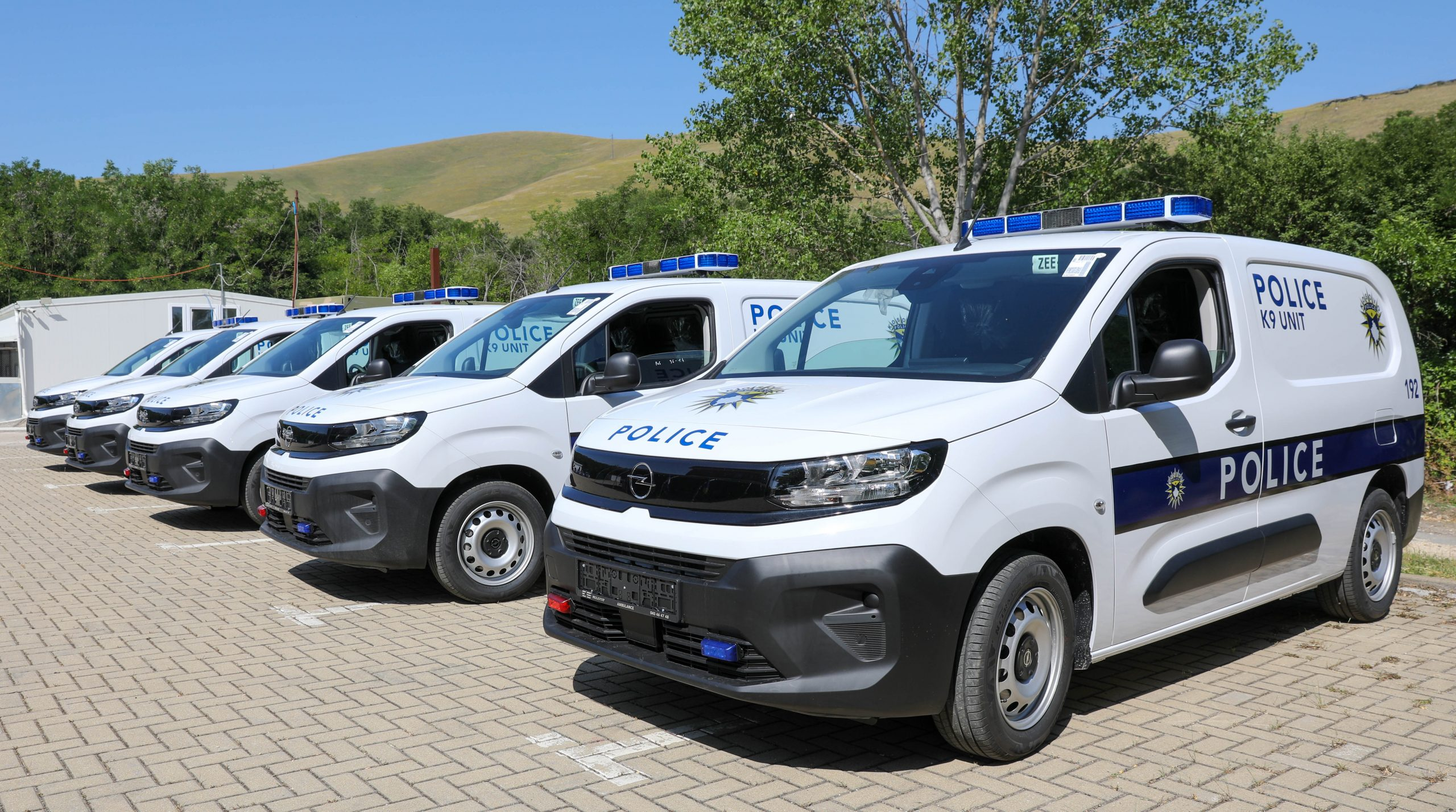
The Opel Combo serving the K9 Unit

The Kosovo Police has a diverse fleet of vehicles suited to serve the needs of patrol, support, and special operations. Standard patrol vehicles used for routine patrol duties in urban and rural areas are Škoda Kodiaq, Škoda Octavia, Škoda Rapid, VW Golf 7, Toyota Corolla and lately also Dacia Duster. The Škoda Octavia estate version, Peugeot Partner and Opel Combo are utilized by the K-9 unit for both patrol and transport, while the Škoda Scala is designated for unmarked patrol operations. In October 2025, Toyota Yaris hybrid vehicles were introduced for neighborhood police units to enhance community policing, improve operational efficiency, and strengthen engagement with local communities.

For high-risk or off-road operations, the Kosovo Police uses vehicles like the Toyota Land Cruiser and Land Cruiser Prado, with the former being fully armored for special tactical missions. The Toyota Hilux has been spotted during police actions in northern Kosovo.

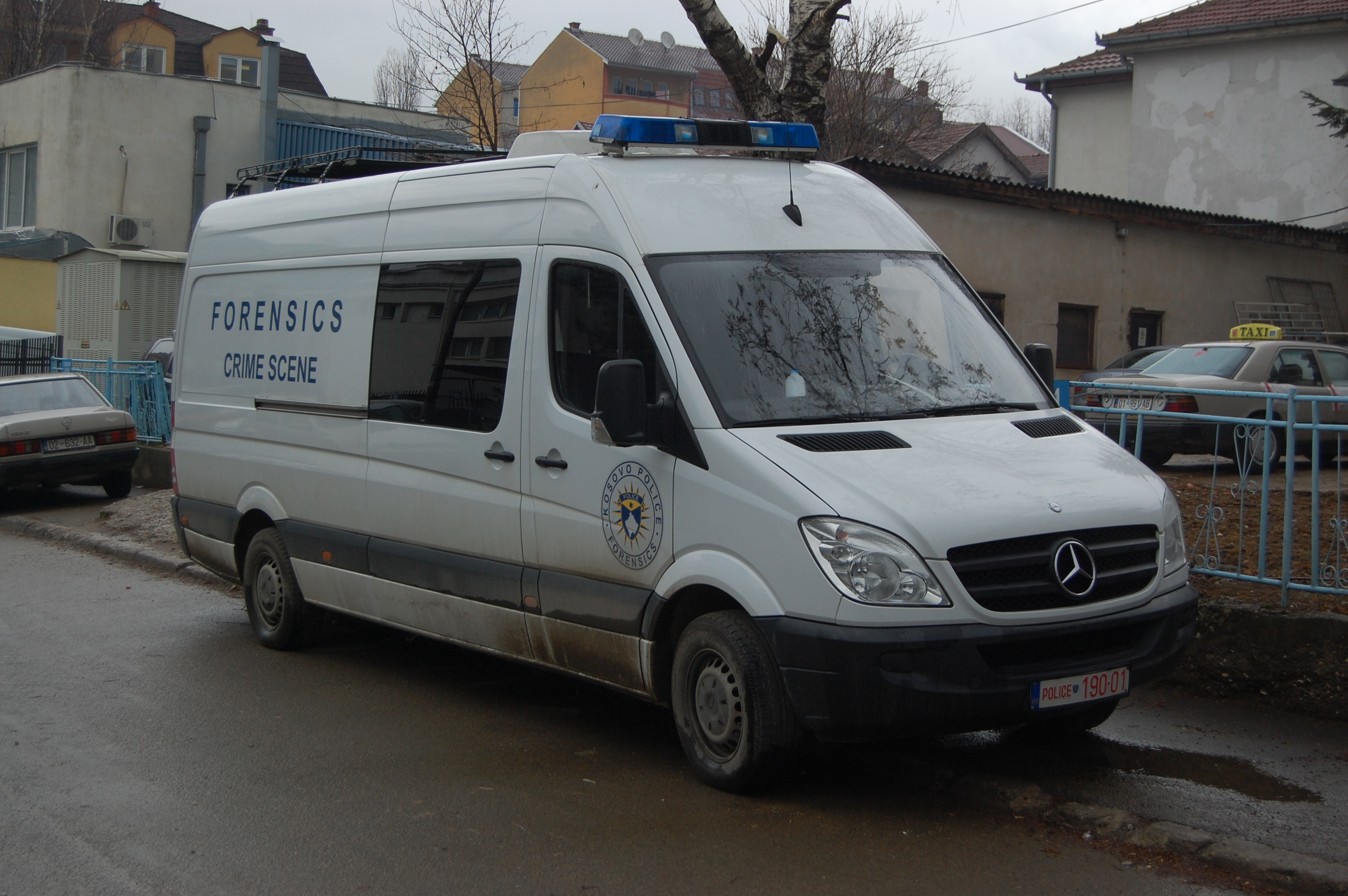
The forensics vehicle, a Mercedes-Benz Sprinter, seen in Prishtina

Several Mercedes-Benz G-Class and Volkswagen Transporter models are also part of the fleet. The Mercedes-Benz Sprinter serves in the transport of special units and forensic teams, while the Iveco Daily is a multi-purpose vehicle used for transporting equipment and moving personnel. For the border police department are the Dacia Duster and the Ford Transit Custom in service.

==== Armored vehicles ====
The armored vehicles are used by special units of the Kosovo Police and are often deployed in volatile or sensitive areas to support high risk operations, tactical interventions but also riot control.

- The STREIT Spartan, an armored personnel carrier, is used for tactical deployment.
- The Humvee, known for its use by military and police forces worldwide, is also part of the Kosovo Police's armored vehicles.
- The Renault Sherpa 2, a light tactical vehicle, is used for high-mobility missions, with ten units reportedly in use.
- The ACMAT Bastion, a mine-resistant and ambush-protected (MRAP) vehicle, is used in limited numbers.
- The IAG Guardian and IAG Sentry, both manufactured by the International Armored Group, are among the most numerous in the fleet, with 19 and 15 units respectively. These vehicles are designed for urban operations and personnel protection.
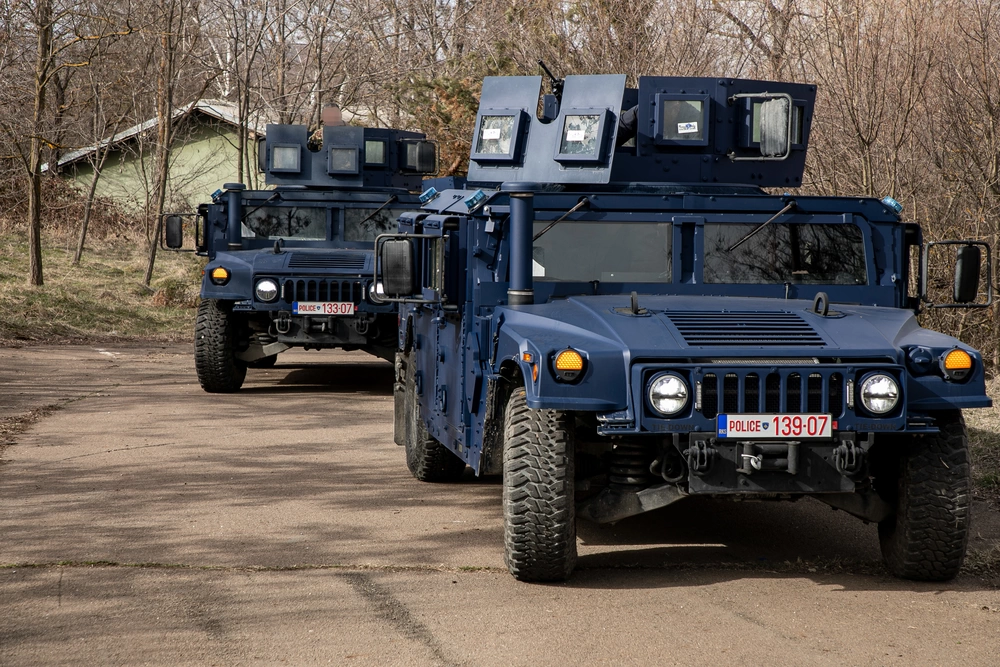
  The Kosovo Special Intervention Unit driving the American Humvees for tactical maneuvering.
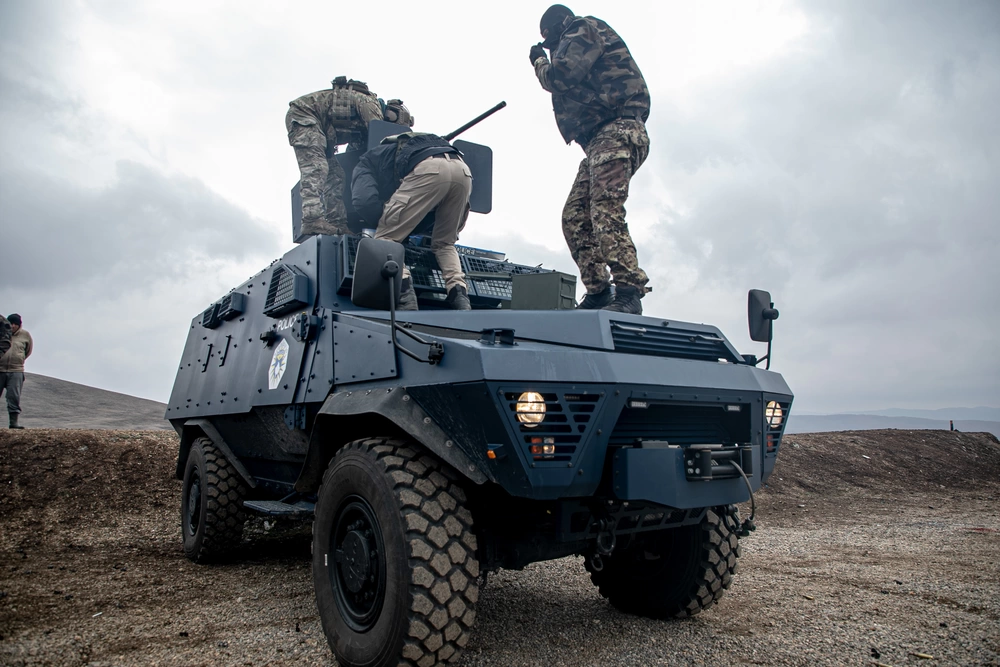
  The Kosovo Special Intervention Unit demonstrating a .50 caliber machine gun capabilities on top of the French ACMAT Bastion.

==== Riot Control Vehicles ====
For crowd control and riot response, the Kosovo Police operates the following vehicles:

- Renault MIC – Four units are used for riot management and public order maintenance.
- TOMA – A Turkish-made water cannon vehicle, with five units currently in service for riot control purposes.

==== Unmanned Aerial Vehicles (UAVs) ====
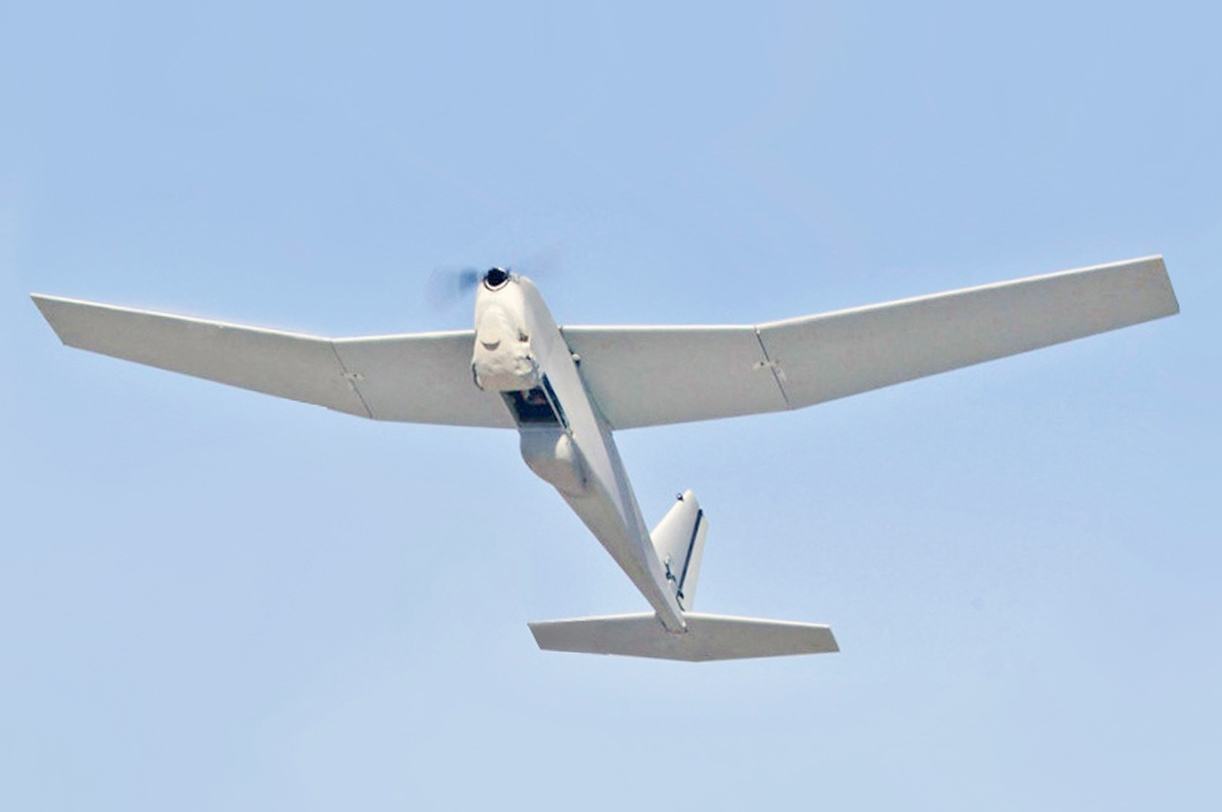
The AeroVironment RQ-20 Puma

- AeroVironment RQ-20 Puma – A hand-launched tactical UAV developed in the United States. It is used for aerial surveillance and intelligence gathering.

== Insignia ==
=== Current ===
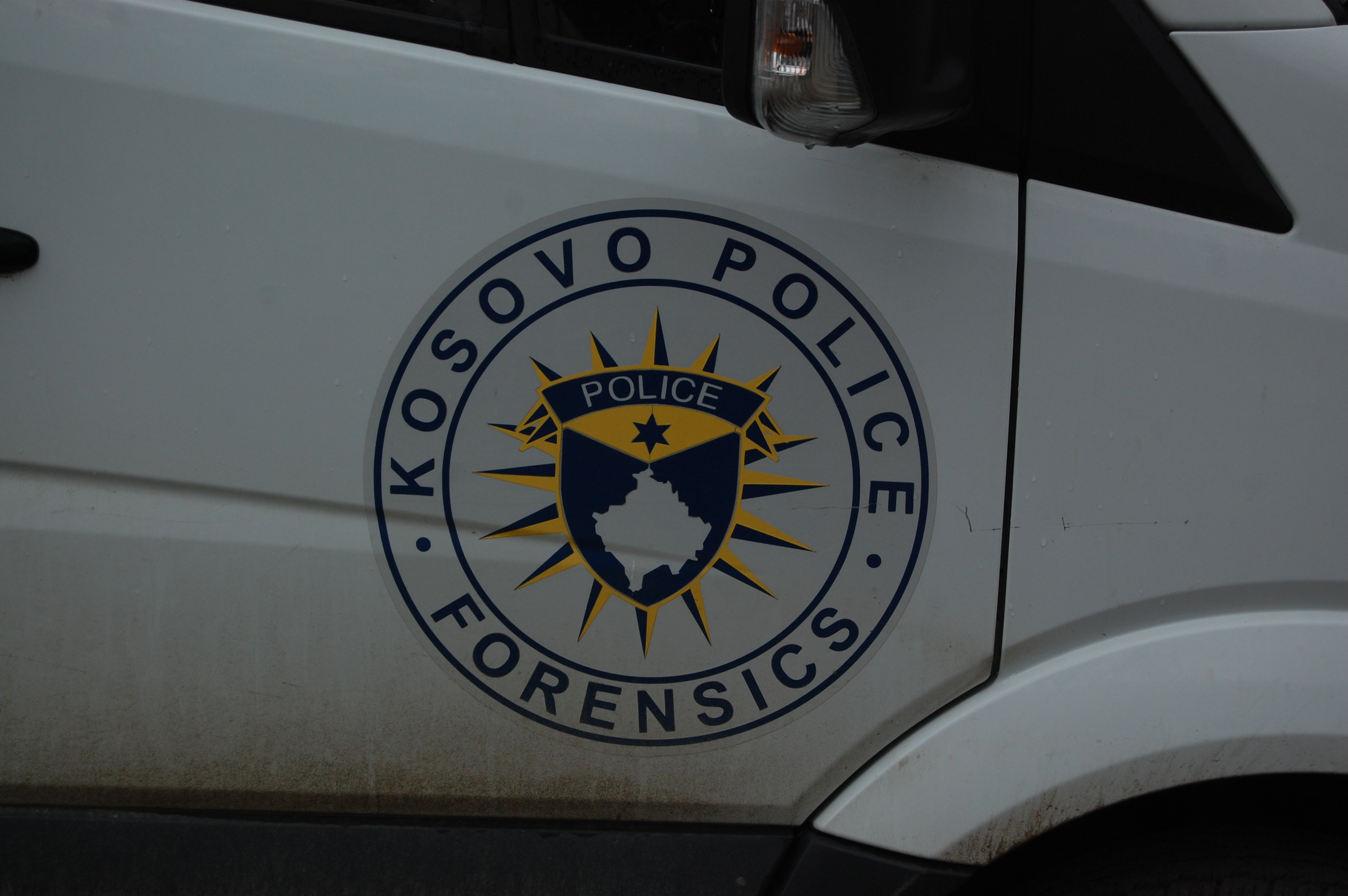
Forensics

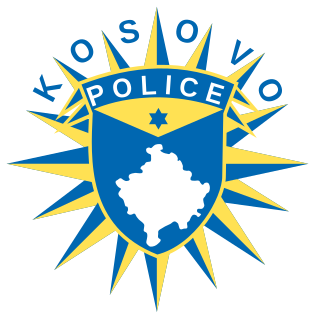
Kosovo Police Insignia

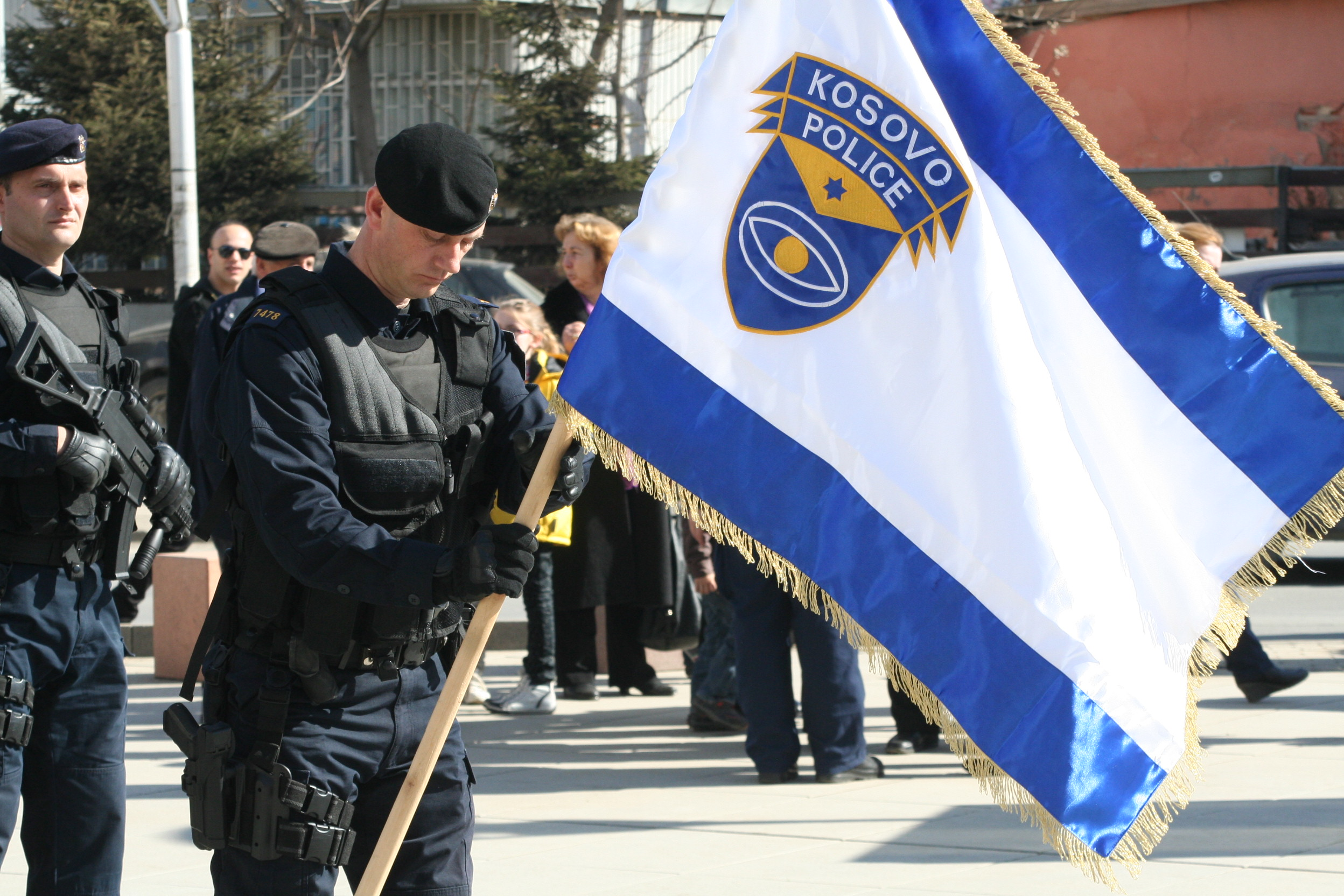
Kosovo Police Flag

=== Historic ===
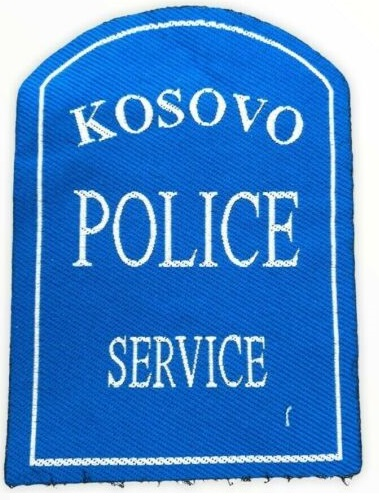
Former emblem of the Kosovo Police Service

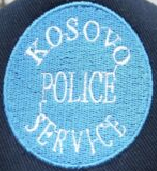
Former cap badge of the Kosovo Police Service

== See also ==
- Kosovo Bomb Squad (IED/EOD)
- Kosovo Protection Corps
- Kosovo Security Force
- Kosovo Force (KFOR)

Crime

- Crime in Kosovo
