= Bajram Rexhepi =

Prime Minister of Kosovo (1954–2017)

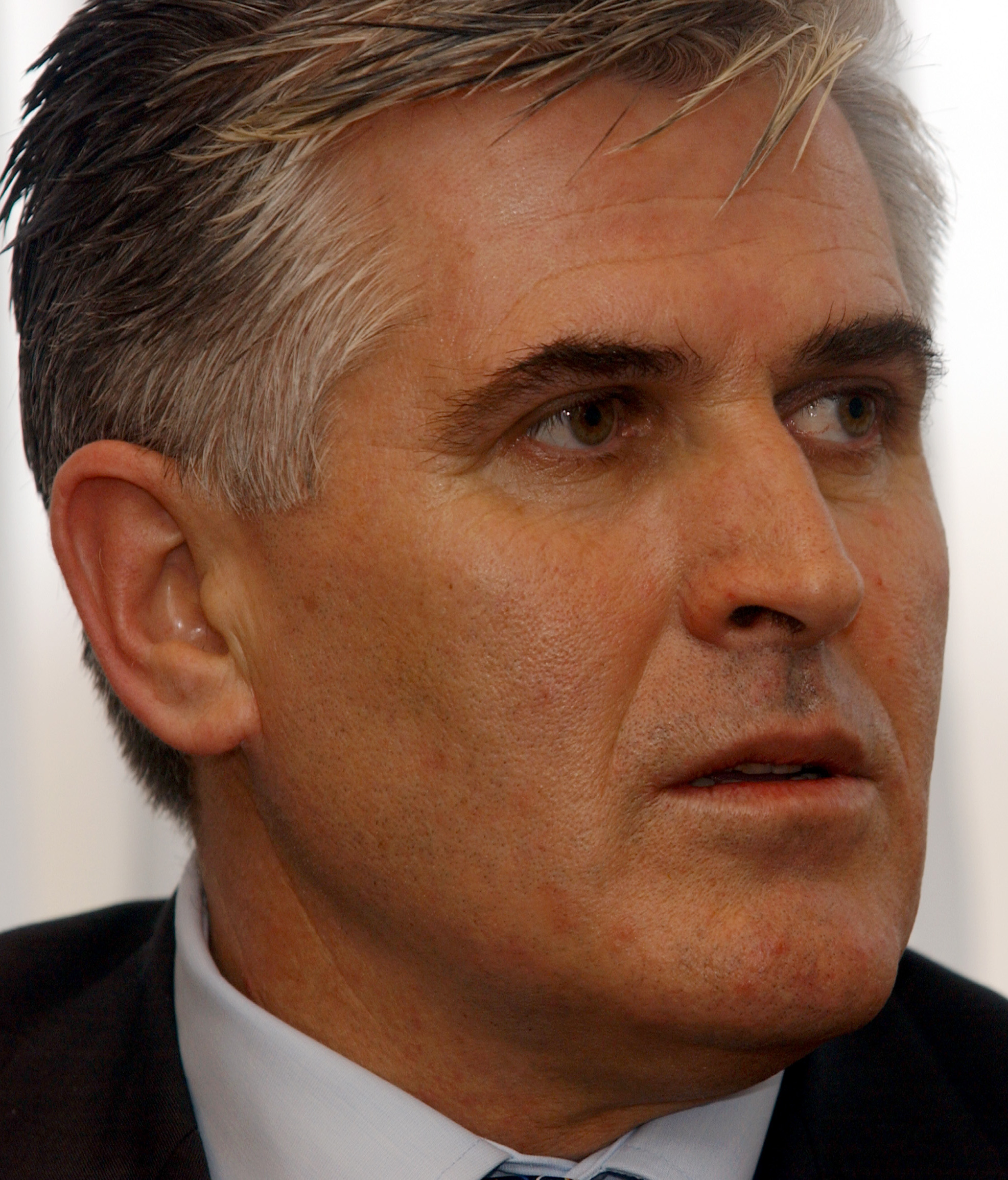
- Rexhepi in 2004

Prime Minister of Kosovo
- In office 4 March 2002 – 3 December 2004
- Preceded by: Bujar Bukoshi
- Succeeded by: Ramush Haradinaj

Minister of Internal Affairs of Kosovo
- In office 1 April 2010 – 12 December 2014
- Preceded by: Zenun Pajaziti
- Succeeded by: Skënder Hyseni

Personal details
- Born: 3 June 1954 Mitrovica, PR Serbia, FPR Yugoslavia (now Kosovo)
- Died: 21 August 2017 (aged 63) Istanbul, Turkey
- Party: Democratic Party of Kosovo (2001–2014)

Bajram Rexhepi (3 June 1954 – 21 August 2017), was a Kosovar politician who served as the first elected post-war Prime Minister of Kosovo, and later as interior minister and as a member of the Kosovo Assembly. He was a member of the second largest political party in Kosovo, the Democratic Party of Kosovo (PDK).

== Early life and education ==
Rexhepi was born in Mitrovica, Kosovo on 3 June 1954. He graduated from the University of Prishtina and completed his postgraduate studies at the University of Zagreb in 1985.

== Early career ==
Rexhepi spent most of his career working as a surgeon and achieved fame as the best surgeon for circumcisions in the Mitrovica region. During the 1999 Kosovo War, Rexhepi joined the Kosovo Liberation Army (KLA) and spent three months serving as a field doctor. He served as mayor of the Albanian section of Mitrovica, working with United Nations and NATO peacekeepers to implement ideas to diminish the civil unrest.

== Prime minister ==
In the general elections of November 2001 in Kosovo, Rexhepi's party won 25.7 percent of the votes, second only to Ibrahim Rugova's Democratic League of Kosovo (LDK), and Rexhepi was appointed prime minister by the Assembly of Kosovo on 4 March 2002.

Bajram Rexhepi was a compromise candidate to lead the broad-coalition government with the support of all parties represented in parliament. LDK declined to support Rexhepi's party leader, Hashim Thaçi, as a potential prime minister; other parties declined to enter into a smaller coalition with LDK. Ultimately, parties reached a political agreement whereby Rugova was elected president and Rexhepi appointed the first post-war prime minister.

With key powers reserved for the UN administration, Rexhepi's cabinet included nine ministers as follows:

- Ali Sadria (LDK), Economy and Finance
- Ali Jakupi (PDK), Trade and Industry
- Rexhep Osmani (LDK), Education, Science and Technology
- Behxhet Brajshori (LDK), Culture, Youth, Sports and Non-Resident Affairs
- Zef Morina (PShDK), Transport and Communications
- Ahmet Jusufi (AAK), Labor and Social Welfare
- Et'hem Çeku (AAK), Spatial Planning
- Jakup Krasniqi (PDK), Public Services
- Numan Balić (SDA), Health

In the following general elections, held on 24 October 2004, the Democratic Party of Kosovo came second and won 30 seats in the parliament.

== Minister of Interior ==
On 1 April 2010, Rexhepi was appointed Minister of Internal Affairs of the Republic of Kosovo, replacing Zenun Pajaziti. On 22 February 2011 the Assembly confirmed Rexhepi in his post within the new Cabinet led by Prime Minister Hashim Thaçi.

== Post-politics, illness, and death ==
Rexhepi left politics in 2014 to resume his career as a surgeon. In April 2017, Rexhepi suffered multiple strokes, which left him in a coma. After several days of treatment in Kosovo, Rexhepi was sent for further treatment in Turkey. On 21 August 2017, Rexhepi died at a hospital in Istanbul at the age of 63.

Political offices
Preceded by Bujar Bukoshi	Prime Minister of Kosovo; 2002–2004	Succeeded by Ramush Haradinaj
