= Skënder Hyseni =

Kosovar Albanian politician

Skender Hyseni
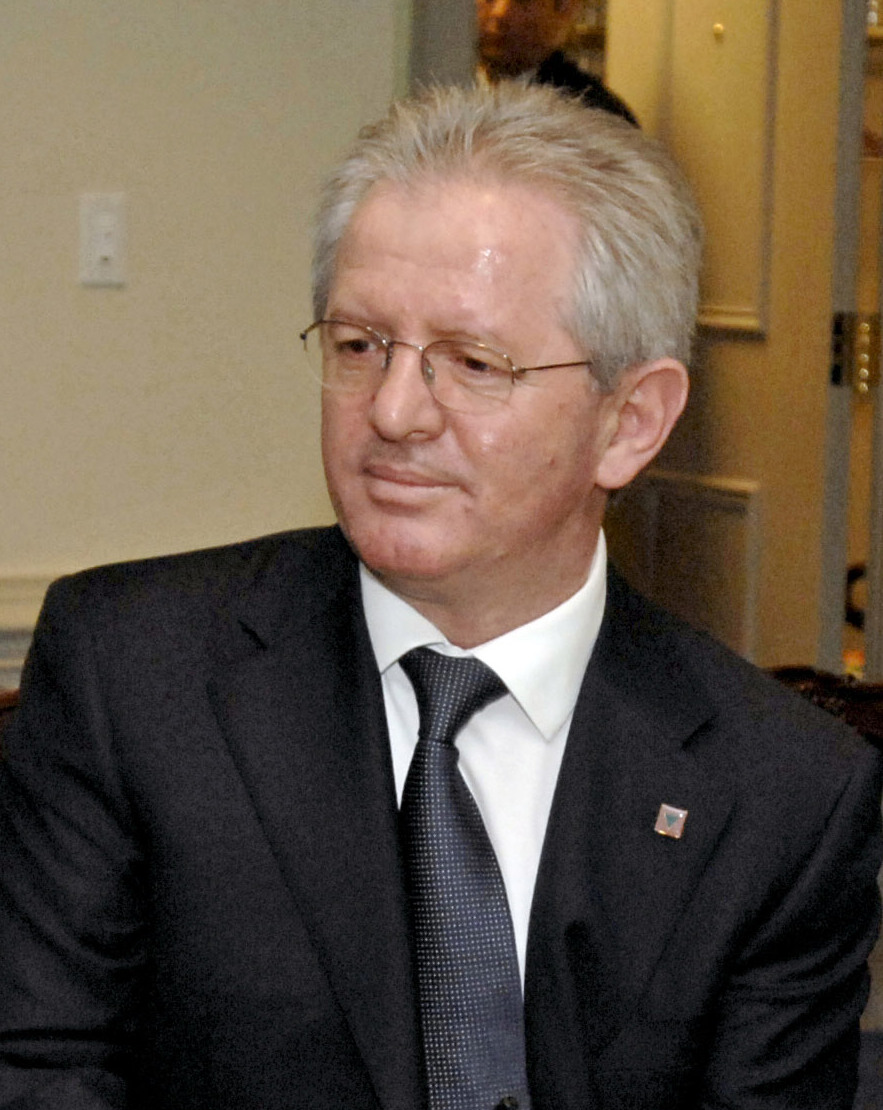

1st Minister of Foreign Affairs
- In office 3 March 2008 – 18 October 2010
- President: Fatmir Sejdiu
- Prime Minister: Hashim Thaçi
- Preceded by: Position Created
- Succeeded by: Vlora Çitaku (Acting); Enver Hoxhaj

Minister of Internal Affairs for Kosovo
- In office 12 December 2014 – 9 September 2017
- President: Atifete Jahjaga; Hashim Thaçi
- Prime Minister: Isa Mustafa
- Preceded by: Bajram Rexhepi
- Succeeded by: Flamur Sefaj

Personal details
- Born: 17 February 1955 (age 71) Podujevo, Kosovo, Yugoslavia
- Party: Democratic League of Kosovo
- Education: University of Pristina; Bloomsburg State College; Aberdeen University

Skënder Hyseni (Serbo-Croatian: Skender Hiseni) (born 17 February 1955 in Podujevo) is a Kosovar Albanian politician who is a former Minister of Internal Affairs and a former foreign minister of Kosovo. Hyseni graduated at the University of Pristina, branch of English Language and Literature in 1979. Hyseni stayed for a short period of time for study purposes in Bloomsburg State College-USA (1978) and in Aberdeen University-Scotland (1986).

He was nominated as a Foreign Minister on 3 March 2008. He held the position until 18 October 2010, when he was replaced by Vlora Çitaku. Before holding this position he was the Minister of Culture, Youth, Sport and Non-Residential Affairs in the same government. Hysen had also served as a spokesman for the government and for Kosovan negotiators before the 2008 Kosovo declaration of independence.

== Party Affiliation ==
He is member of the Democratic League of Kosovo (LDK) party.

== Portfolio ==
Past and Present Activities and Functions

- Principal Political Adviser of President Ibrahim Rugova and President Fatmir Sejdiu
- Member of Presidency of LDK party and Secretary for International Relationship
- Spokesman of Unity Team
- Member of Constituent Committee of Kosovo
