= Ministry of Internal Affairs (Kosovo) =

The Ministry of Internal Affairs is a department of the Government of the Republic of Kosovo. Its stated purpose is to "build, preserve and increase the security for all citizens" in cooperation with them.

The ministry was established by the United Nations Interim Administration Mission in Kosovo (UNMIK) in December 2005, at the same time as Kosovo's justice ministry, and the first minister was appointed in 2006. Following Kosovo's unilateral declaration of independence in February 2008, it was incorporated into the administration of the Republic of Kosovo.

The internal affairs ministry oversees several agencies, including the Kosovo Police, the Kosovo Academy for Public Safety, the Kosovo Forensic Agency, the Kosovo Police Inspectorate, the Emergency Management Agency, the Civil Registration Agency, the Cyber Security Agency, and the Information Society Agency.

The current minister is Xhelal Sveçla, who has served in the role since 22 March 2021.

== List of Ministers ==
Name	Party	Term of Office		Prime Minister
Minister of Internal Affairs
Fatmir Rexhepi (born 6 July 1956)	LDK	10 March 2006	12 February 2007	Çeku
Blerim Kuqi (born 3 April 1963)	LDK	12 February 2007	9 January 2008	Çeku
Zenun Pajaziti (born 12 September 1966)	PDK	9 January 2008	1 April 2010	Thaçi
Bajram Rexhepi (3 June 1954 – 21 August 2017)	PDK	1 April 2010	9 December 2014	Thaçi
Skënder Hyseni (born 17 February 1955)	LDK	9 December 2014	9 September 2017	Mustafa
Flamur Sefaj (born 8 October 1972)	AKR	9 September 2017	3 April 2018	Haradinaj
Bejtush Gashi (born 17 July 1957)	AKR	13 April 2018	15 October 2018	Haradinaj
Ekrem Mustafa (born 10 November 1962)	AKR	15 October 2018	3 February 2020	Haradinaj
Minister of Internal Affairs and Public Administration
Agim Veliu (born 15 July 1960)	LDK	3 February 2020	18 March 2020	Kurti
Xhelal Sveçla (acting) (born 15 July 1960)	VV	18 March 2020	3 June 2020	Kurti
Agim Veliu (born 15 July 1960)	LDK	3 June 2020	22 March 2021	Hoti
Minister of Internal Affairs
Xhelal Sveçla (born 15 July 1960)	VV	22 March 2021	3 June 2020	Kurti
