= Zenun Pajaziti =

Kosovar politician (born 1966)

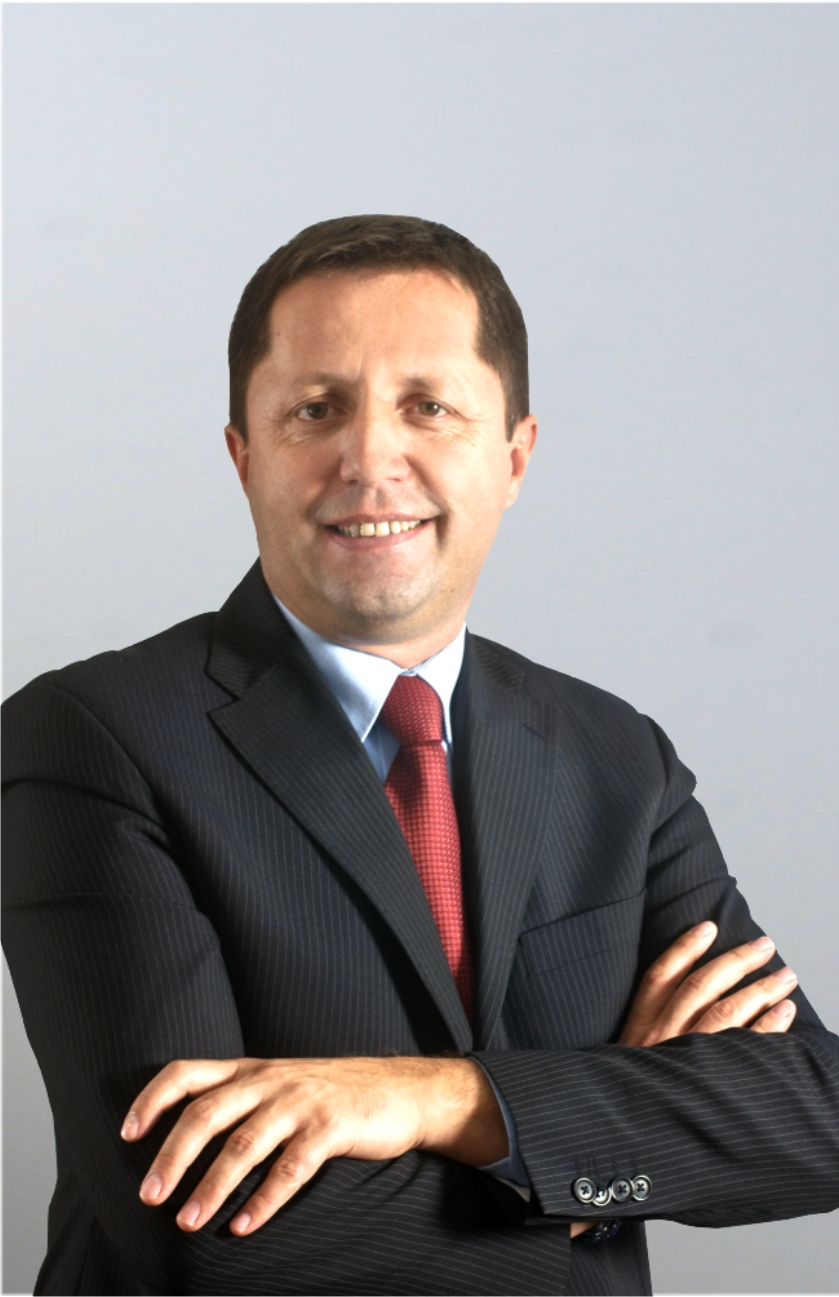
- Born: September 12, 1966 (age 59); Gjilan, SR Serbia, SFR Yugoslavia (modern Kosovo)
- Citizenship: Kosovan
- Occupation: Politician
- Political party: Democratic Party of Kosovo - DPK
- Children: 3
- Website: www.zenunpajaziti.com

Zenun Pajaziti (born September 12, 1966 in Gjilan, Kosovo) is Deputy Minister of Labour and Social Welfare in the Government of the Republic of Kosovo.

== Career ==
Pajaziti was Minister of Internal Affairs of Republic of Kosovo from January 2008 to reshape of the Government of Kosovo in September 2010. He's the leading member of the Democratic Party of Kosovo (PDK).

He studied at the Technical Faculty of the University of Pristina where he specialized in construction. He later studied at the Prishtina Institute for Political Studies and finished the course from the program for an International Visitor Leadership for Accountability and Ethics in Government and Business, sponsored by the State Department of American Office in Pristina.

During the Kosovo war, Mr. Pajaziti served the Emergency Committee of Kosovo in Pristina where he was responsible for Internally Displaced Persons (IDPs). From November 1999 until March 2000 he worked as Programme Development Coordinator to the NGO International Medical Corps. From 2000 he was a member of the Advisory Board for Kosovo Action Together, an NGO that monitored the activities of youth centers operating in Kosovo.

In March 2000, he became co-head of Department of Sports in the structure of the joint interim administration that was the highest advisory body to UNMIK. In this role he established the new organizational structure for sport in Kosovo, becoming head of the department in November 2000.

In 2004 he joined the government, serving in the Office of the Prime Minister as leader of the government Liaison Office with UNMIK, the Special Representative of the Secretary-General and Coordinator for Standards. In 2005 he returned to the NGO Kosovo Action Together as executive director.

From 2005 until 2007 he was a consultant with Public Administration International (PAI), a public sector management consultancy group, engaged in support for European Integration processes and standards, a project funded by the Department for International Development UK (DFID).

The work of Pajaziti has focused on European integration and standards issues in humanitarian assistance for displaced persons, sport and promoting activities for young people. Zenun Pajaziti is Chairman of the Board of the Volleyball Federation of Kosovo and vice president of Olympic Committee of Kosovo.

In 2008, after Kosovo's declaration of independence, he became Kosovo's Interior Minister. During his work as Minister of Internal Affairs, Pajaziti has prioritized key issues such as law and order, and launched campaigns to combat organized crime and trafficking in human beings. Minister Pajaziti has given priority to international cooperation on policing and security, and close relations with regional states.

Under his leadership, the Ministry of Internal Affairs was responsible for planning and implementation issues for civil documents, including Kosovo passports, identity cards and driving licenses.

Pajaziti has overseen a major reform of the police in Kosovo, including the preparation and implementation of the Police Law of 2008 which transferred Kosovo Police responsibilities from International Supervision to the Ministry of Internal Affairs.

From 2012 he has been elected three times as a member of Republic of Kosovo parliament, where he served as chief of PDK members of parliament group.

== Personal life ==
Pajaziti is married and has two sons and a daughter.
