= Xhelal Sveçla =

Kosovar politician; Minister of Interior

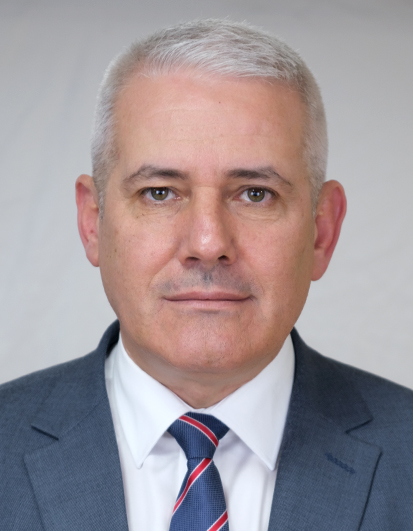
- Official portrait as member of parliament

Minister of Internal Affairs
- Incumbent
- Assumed office 22 March 2021
- President: Glauk Konjufca (acting); Vjosa Osmani; Albulena Haxhiu (acting)
- Prime Minister: Albin Kurti
- Preceded by: Agim Veliu

Personal details
- Born: 21 April 1970 (age 56) Pristina, SFR Yugoslavia
- Party: Vetëvendosje

Xhelal Sveçla (born 21 April 1970) is a Kosovar dentist and politician, currently serving as the Minister of Internal Affairs and Public Administration in the Second Kurti cabinet. He was formerly a Member of Parliament, then First Deputy Minister of Internal Affairs, and acting Minister.

Sveçla began his studies at the dentistry school of the University of Pristina in 1990, but transferred to the University of Tirana, where he obtained his degree. As a student leader, he was among the organisers of protests against the Serbian regime in Kosovo in the 1990s and served as an executive officer in the Independent Student Union of the University of Pristina. In 1998, he joined the Kosovo Liberation Army.

Sveçla worked with various organisations in Pristina and Tirana, as coordinator for International Medical Corps Tirana and national director of SOS Kinderdorf International, which focused on helping disadvantaged children. In 2003, Sveçla became part of the Kosova Action Network (KAN), a civil society organisation that sought social change through citizen activism. KAN was a predecessor of the Vetëvendosje Movement, which was formed in 2005.

In 2013, Sveçla was appointed director of the inspectorate the Municipality of Pristina, where he helped institute rule of law and improve oversight. He was a member of the Kosovo parliament with the Vetëvendosje caucus in the 6th legislature, serving as deputy chairman and later chairman of the committee on communities. He was also a member of the internal affairs committee and chairman of the investigative committee on the kidnapping of six Turkish citizens.

He became first deputy minister of internal affairs in the first Kurti government in February 2020. He was then acting minister from 19 March to 3 June, when a new government was voted in. He returned to government with the second Kurti cabinet as minister of internal affairs on 22 March 2021.
