= ASH-78 =

Albanian assault rifle

ASh-78
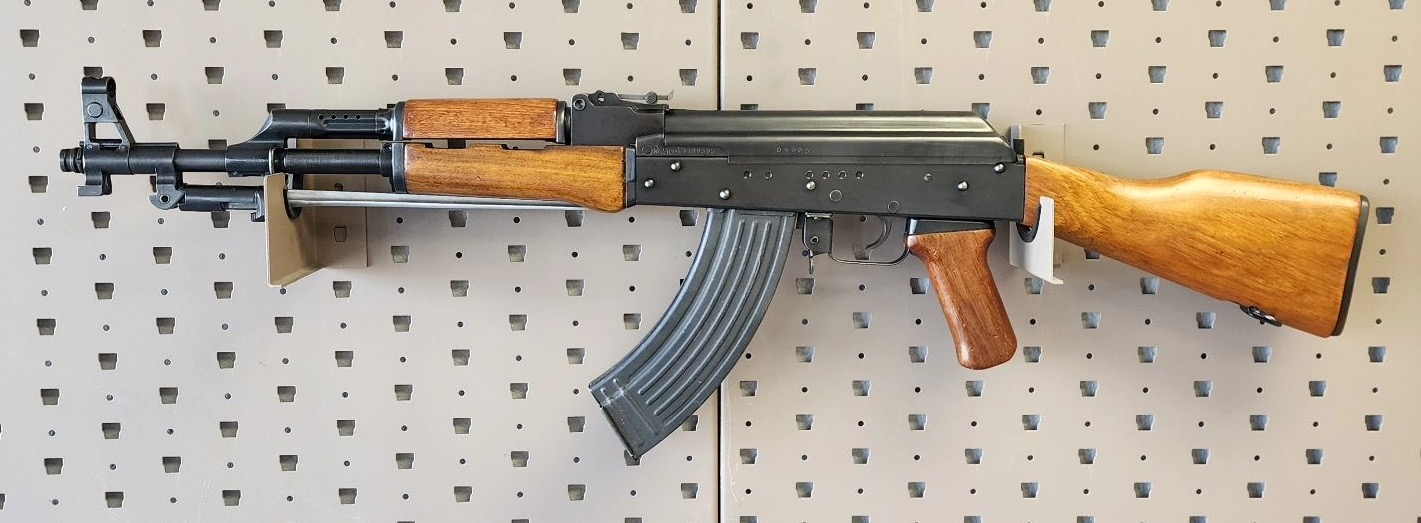
- A Tip-1 rifle with bayonet folded
- Type: Assault rifle
- Place of origin: Albania

Service history
- In service: 1978−present
- Used by: See users
- Wars: Yugoslav Wars; Bosnian War; Kosovo Insurgency; Kosovo War; Presevo Valley Insurgency; Macedonia Insurgency; 1997 Albanian civil unrest

Production history
- Manufacturer: Gramsh state arsenal
- Produced: 1978−1997
- Variants: See variants

Specifications (ASh-78 Tip-1)
- Mass: 4.2 kg (9.3 lb)
- Length: 880 mm (35 in)
- Barrel length: 414 mm (16.3 in)
- Cartridge: 7.62×39mm
- Action: Gas, select fire
- Feed system: 30-round box magazine

The ASh-78 (Albanian: Automatiku Shqiptar 78) is an Albanian assault rifle developed in the 1970s. It is a licensed derivative of the Type 56 assault rifle.

== History ==
Albania started a domestic small arms production program in 1962, by starting the construction of a state arsenal at the town of Gramsh. This was done with Chinese assistance. Prior to this, the country relied entirely on imported weapons (mostly from the Soviet Union before the Albanian–Soviet split). The Albanians first produced copies of the Type 56 carbine in 1966, and in 1974 the Um Gramsh arsenal obtained a license from Norinco to produce a copy of the Type 56 assault rifle, which was accepted into service in 1978 as the Automatiku Shqiptar 78 (ASh-78).

According to Albanian sources, as many as 26,000 rifles were produced annually, but by mid-1990s only a few weapons were produced; In 2004, the United Nations Department for Disarmament Affairs stated that there was no longer any effective state-run military production facilities in Albania. According to Jones and Ness, the Um Gramsh arsenal kept production of these rifles running until 1997.

== Design ==
Chambered in 7.62×39mm, the Albanian ASH-78 is a variant of the AK family of rifles, specifically modeled after the Type 56 assault rifle. The design was heavily influenced by the Chinese AK models due to Albania's close ties with China during the Cold War, particularly after its split from the Soviet Union.

The ASH-78 does not have a magazine guide depression on either side of the stamped receiver. There are markings for “Auto” (A) and “Single” (1) select-fire capabilities.

The ASH-78 is considered to have moderate accuracy, in line with similar AK-pattern rifles. It is capable of effective fire at ranges of 300 to 400 meters.

== Variants ==
- ASh-78 Tip-1 − A direct copy of the Type 56 assault rifle, complete with folding bayonet. The rear sight is calibrated to 800 m (870 yd)
- ASh-78 Tip-2 − A rifle grenade launcher variant fitted with a longer barrel, a spigot-type grenade launcher, and a gas cut-off lever on the right side of the gas port. The rear sight is calibrated to 1,000 m (1,100 yd). It also lacks a bayonet
- ASh-78 Tip-3 − A modified Tip-2 rifle, it has a provision for gas cut-off during grenade firing and can be fitted with a bipod. According to Jones and Ness, it was possibly intended to be deployed as a squad automatic weapon

== Users ==
=== Current ===
- Afghanistan − A total of 30,600 rifles were exported in 2002 and 2010.
- Albania

=== Former ===
- Bosnia and Herzegovina: Bosnian Muslims received weapons from Sali Berisha during the Bosnian war

=== Non-state actors ===
- Kosovo Liberation Army

== Gallery ==
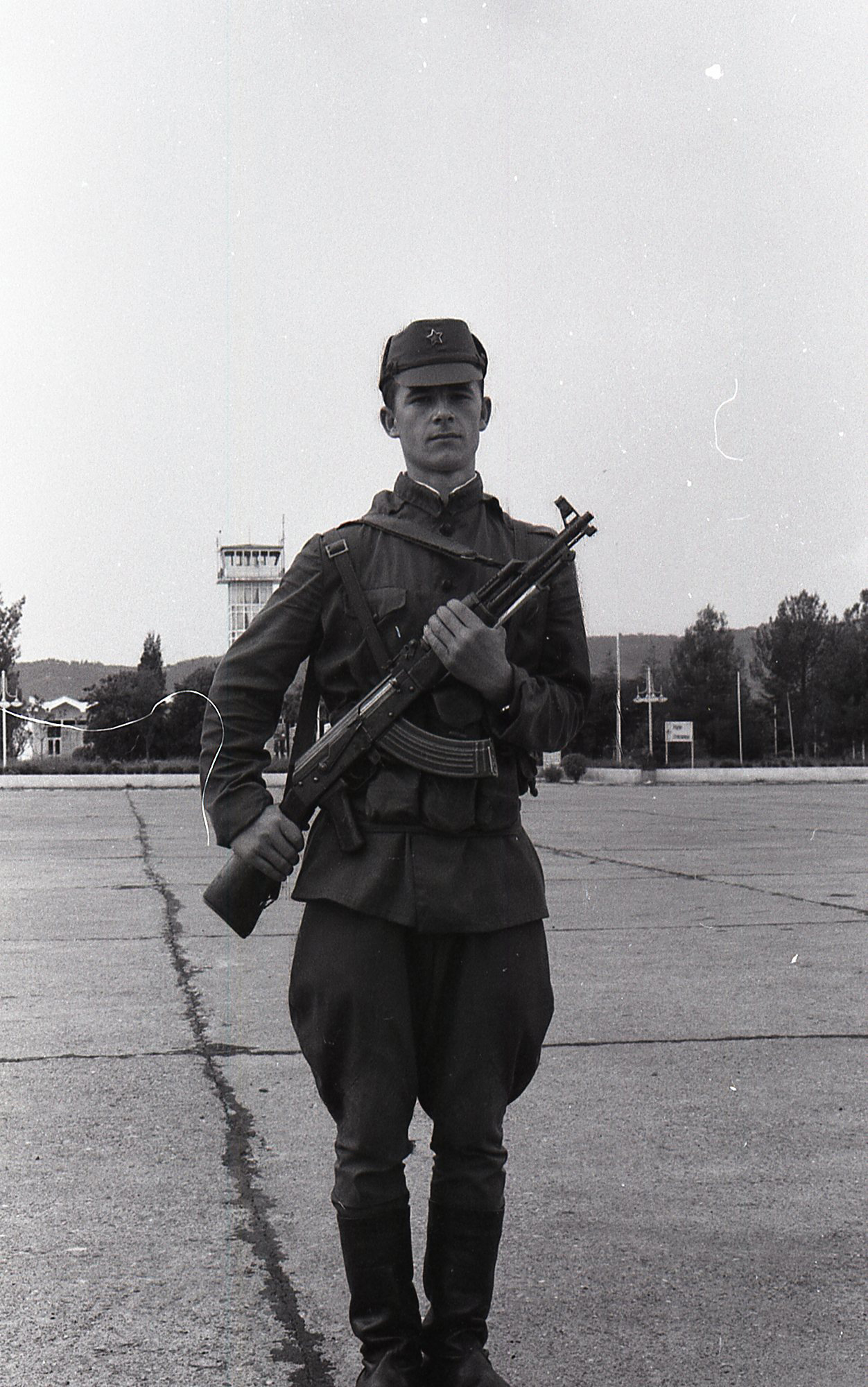
Albanian People's Army soldier holding ASH-78.

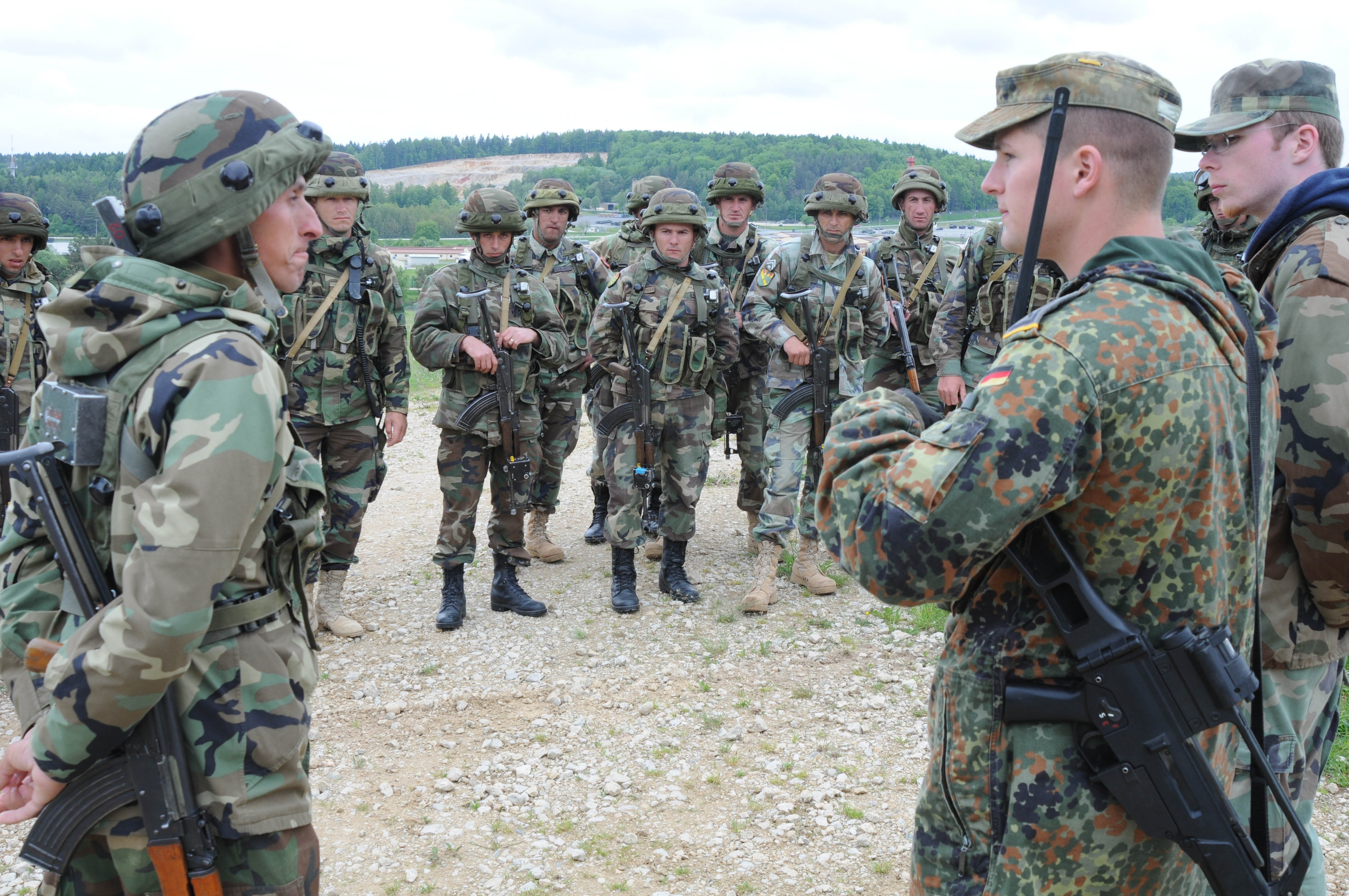
Albanian soldiers in 2012, carrying a mix of ASH rifles and Chinese Type 56-1s.

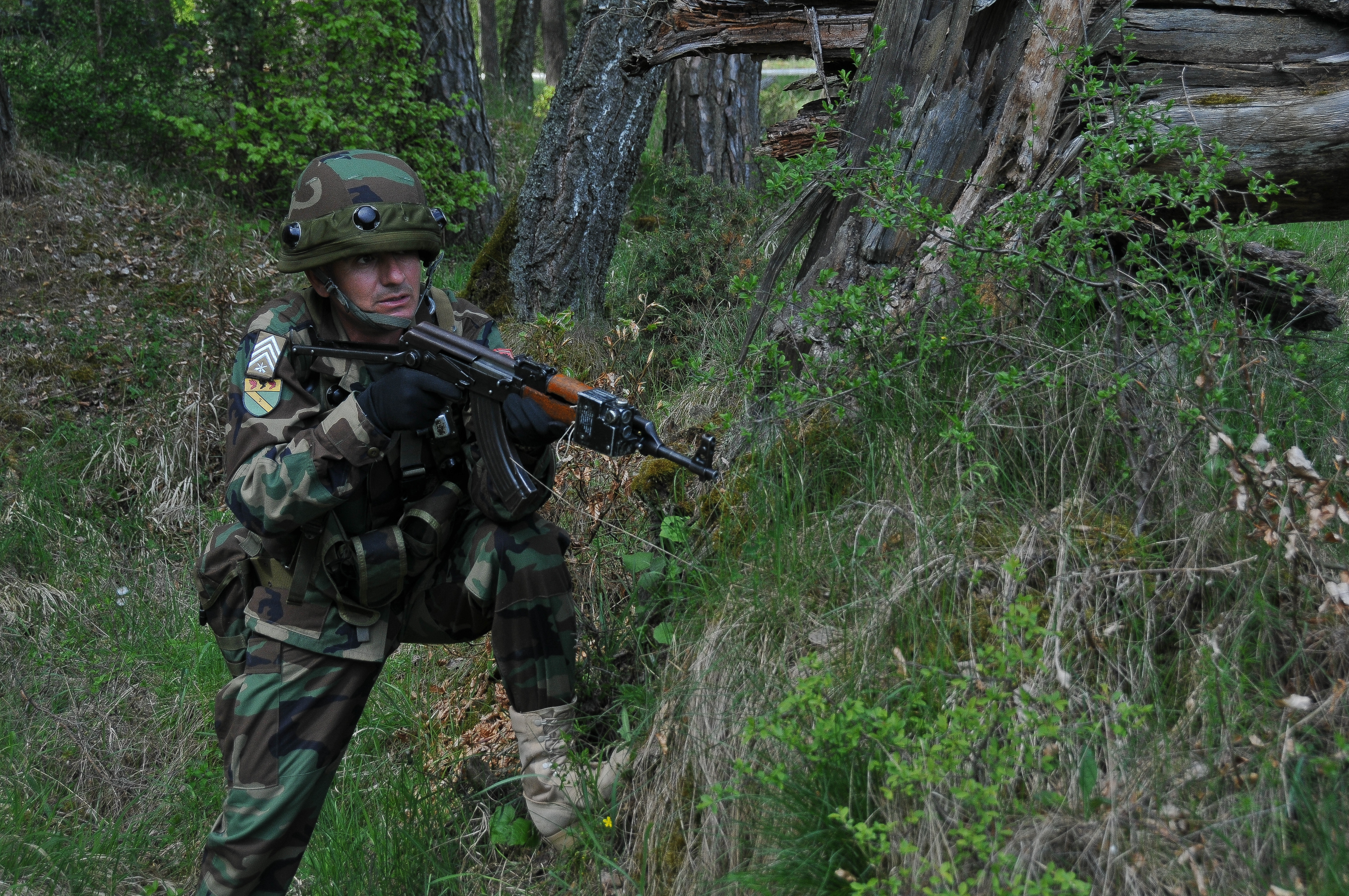
