= Bomb Squad (IED/EOD) Kosovo =

Bomb Squad (IED/EOD) Kosovo Police

Agency overview
- Formed: 2006
- Employees: 15 employees

Jurisdictional structure
- Operations jurisdiction: Kosovo
- Governing body: Ministry of Interior
- General nature: Local civilian police

Operational structure
- Headquarters: Camp Vrello, Pristina, Kosovo

Website
- Official Website

The Kosovo Police's Bomb Squad (IED/EOD) was established in March 2006, prompted by the necessity to protect citizens' lives and property, and to assist in investigation of crime-related cases.

Bomb Squad is established at the KP Main Headquarters Level and is responsible to respond to the calls of all 8 Kosovo regions. The bomb squad closely cooperates with investigation units and prosecutor's office in the course of post-blast investigations, after bomb threats and during arrest of persons who are in an illegal possession of explosive devices.

== Current capabilities ==
- Responding to cases of bomb threats
- Responding to CBRN
- Disposing and neutralizing all bombs
- Investigating post-blast incident scenes and providing assistance in reconstruction of explosive device following the blast, and preserving evidences
- Compiling experts report for the court
- Conducting searches in facilities involving High Risk
- Providing technical support to special operations, for example; SIU, V.I.P. and/or other Special searches.

== Gallery ==
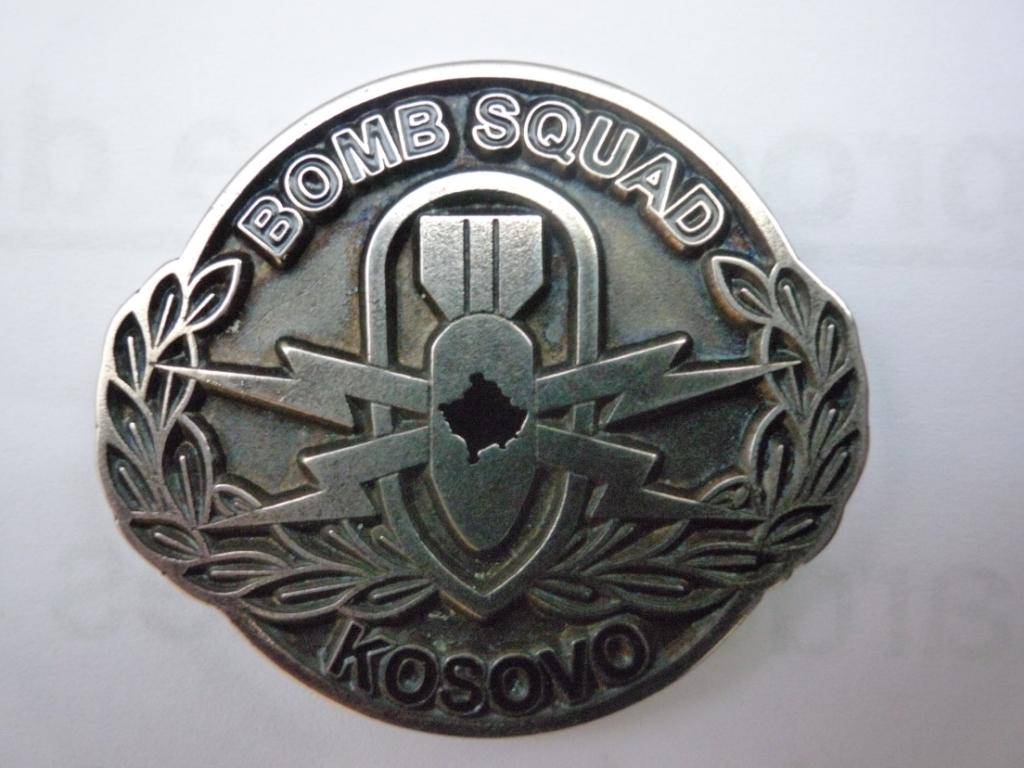

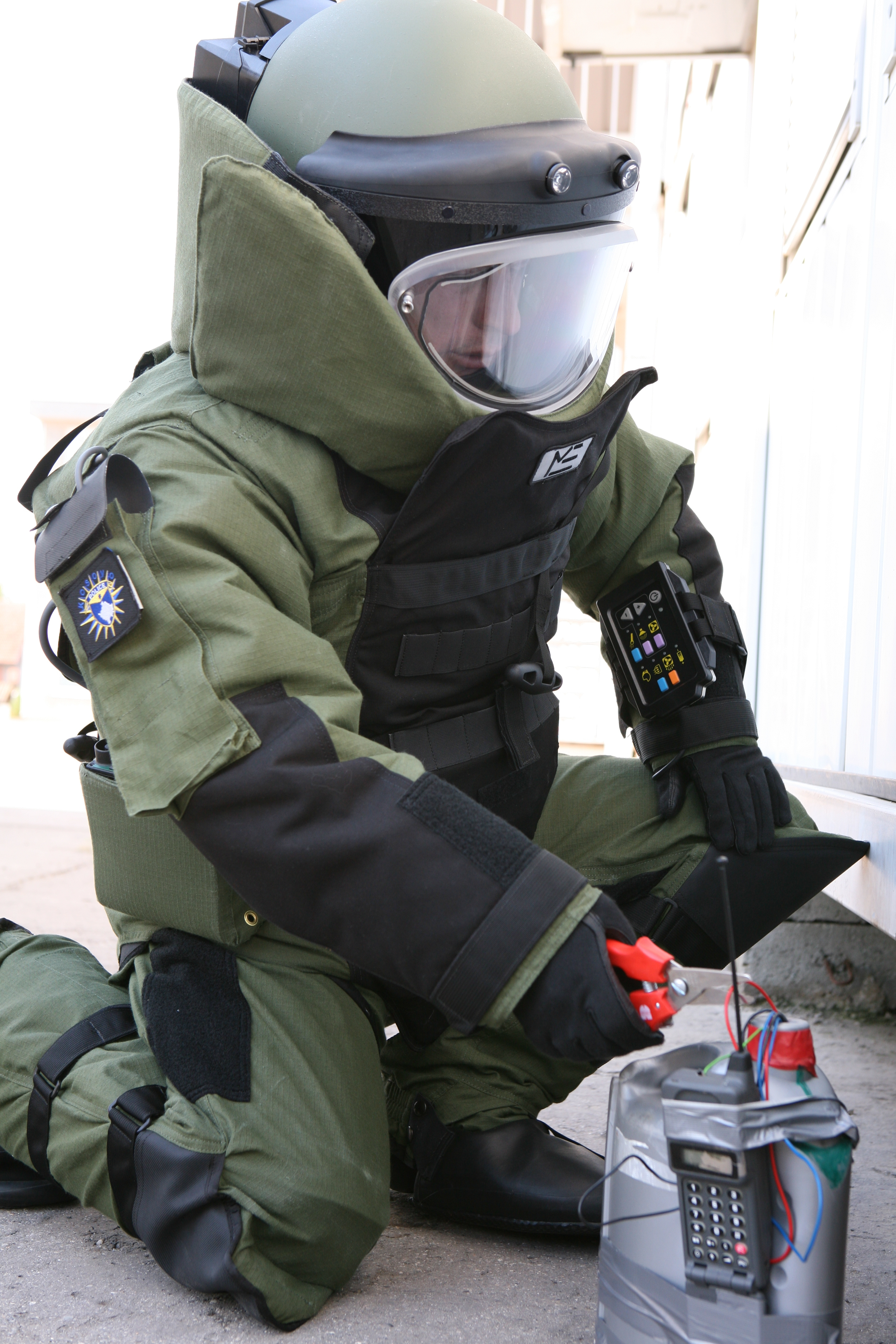

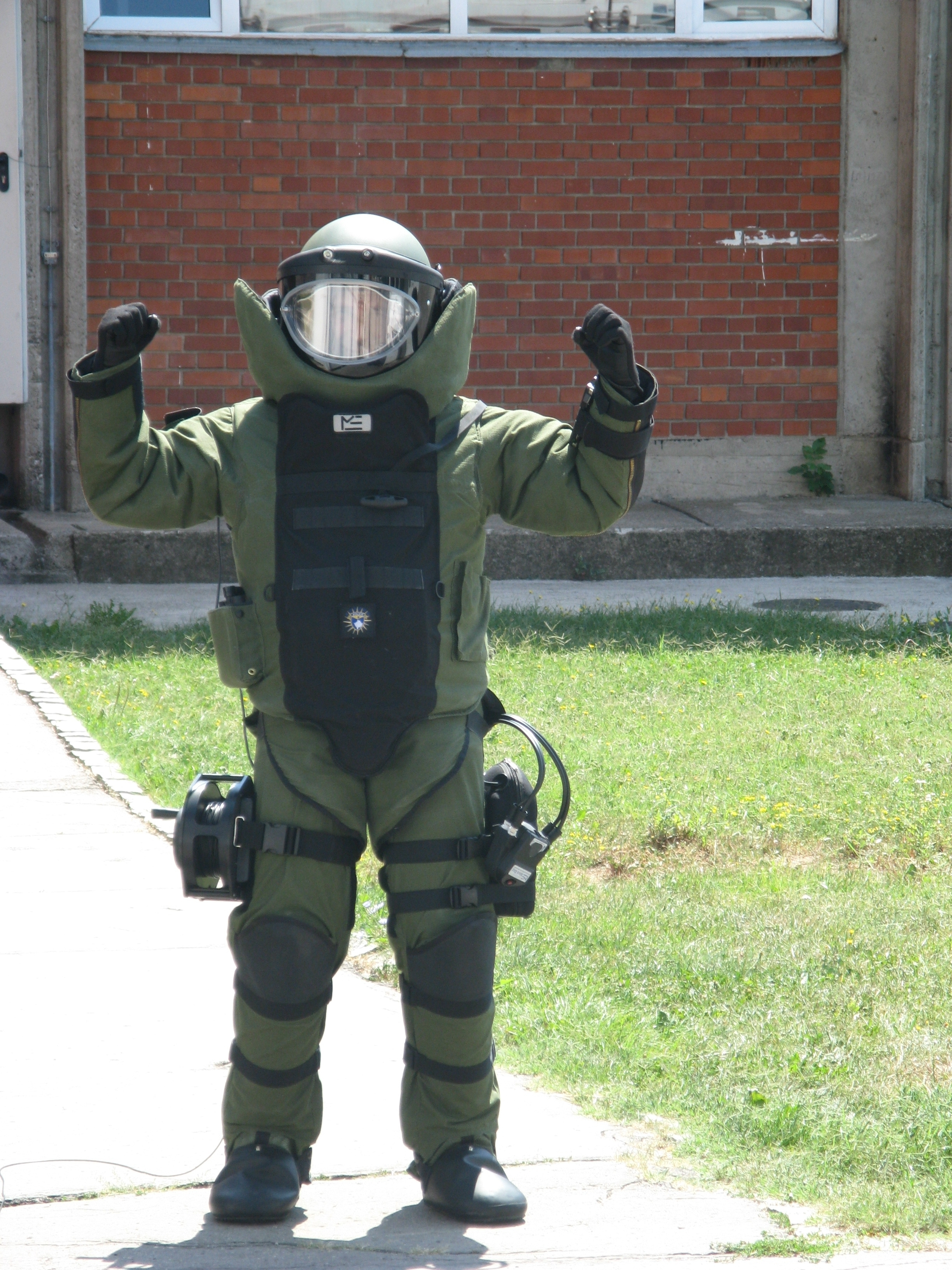

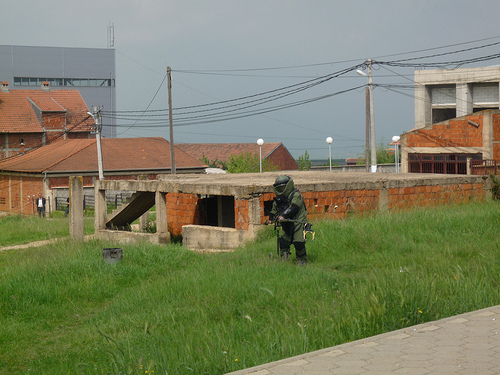

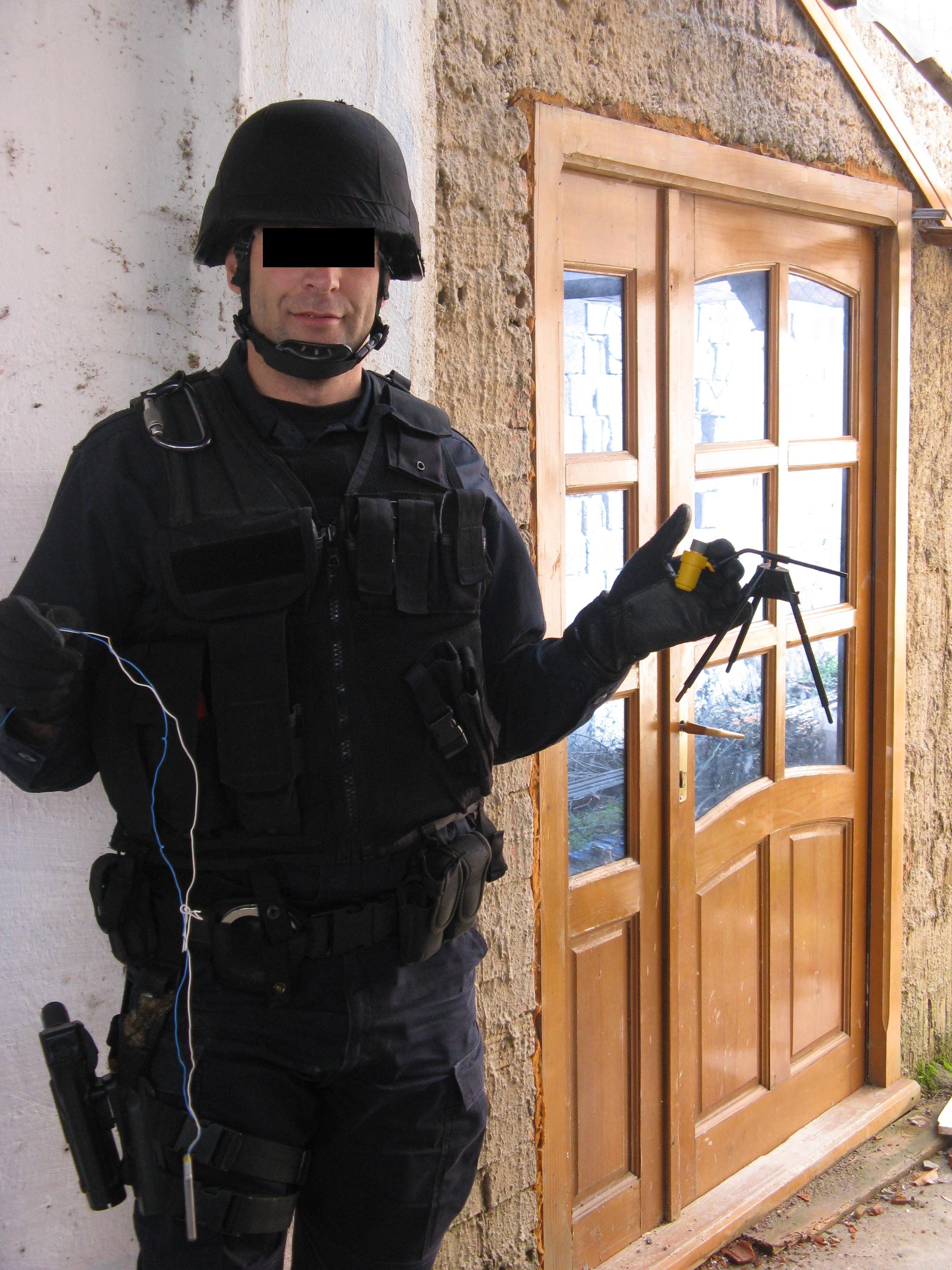

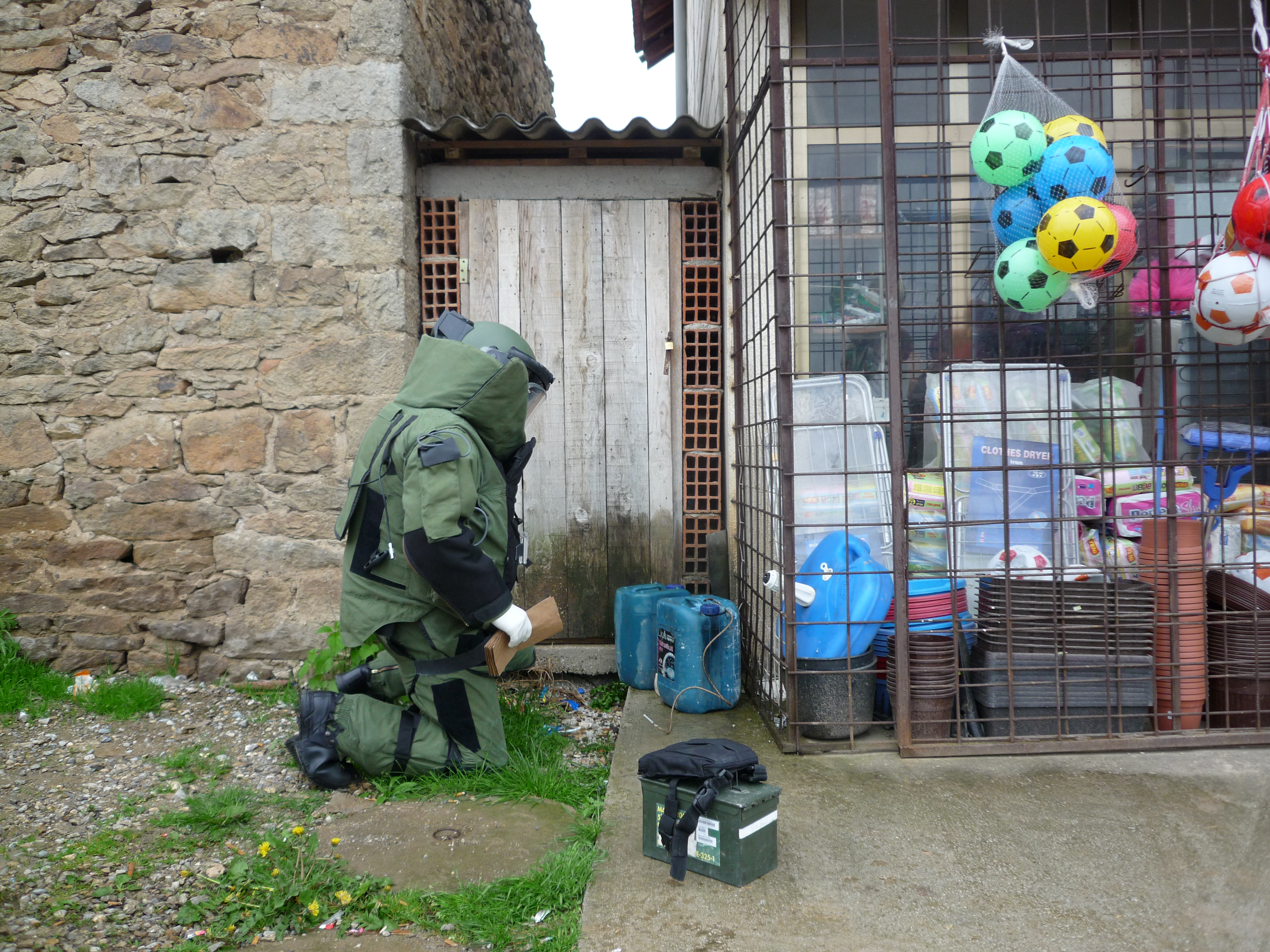

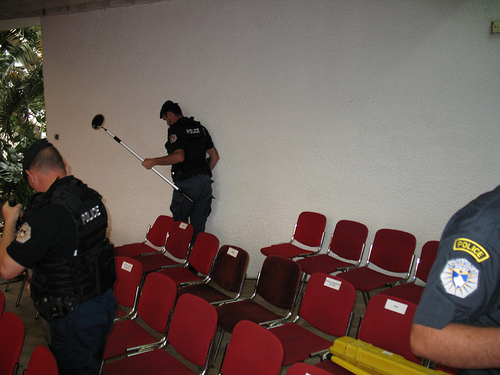

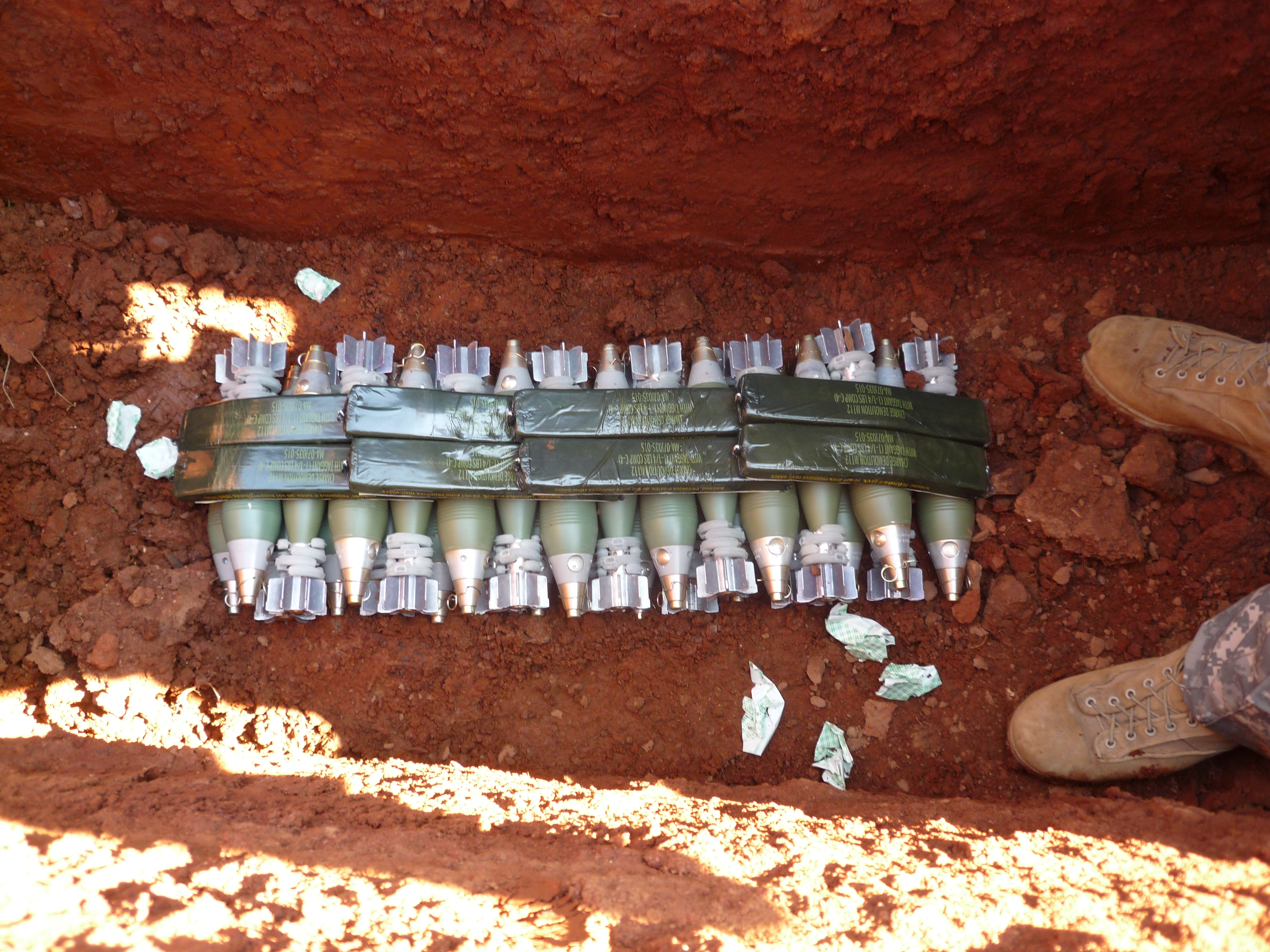
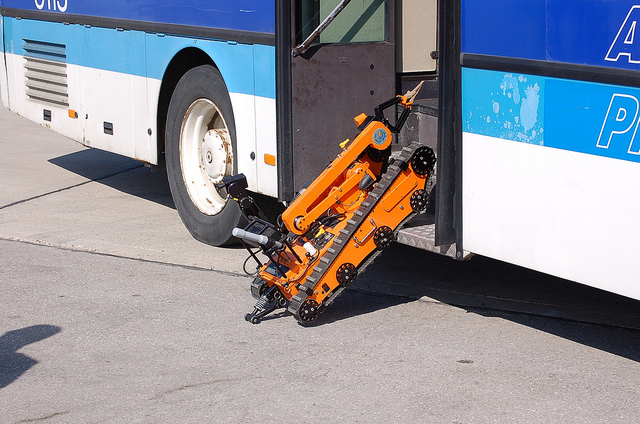

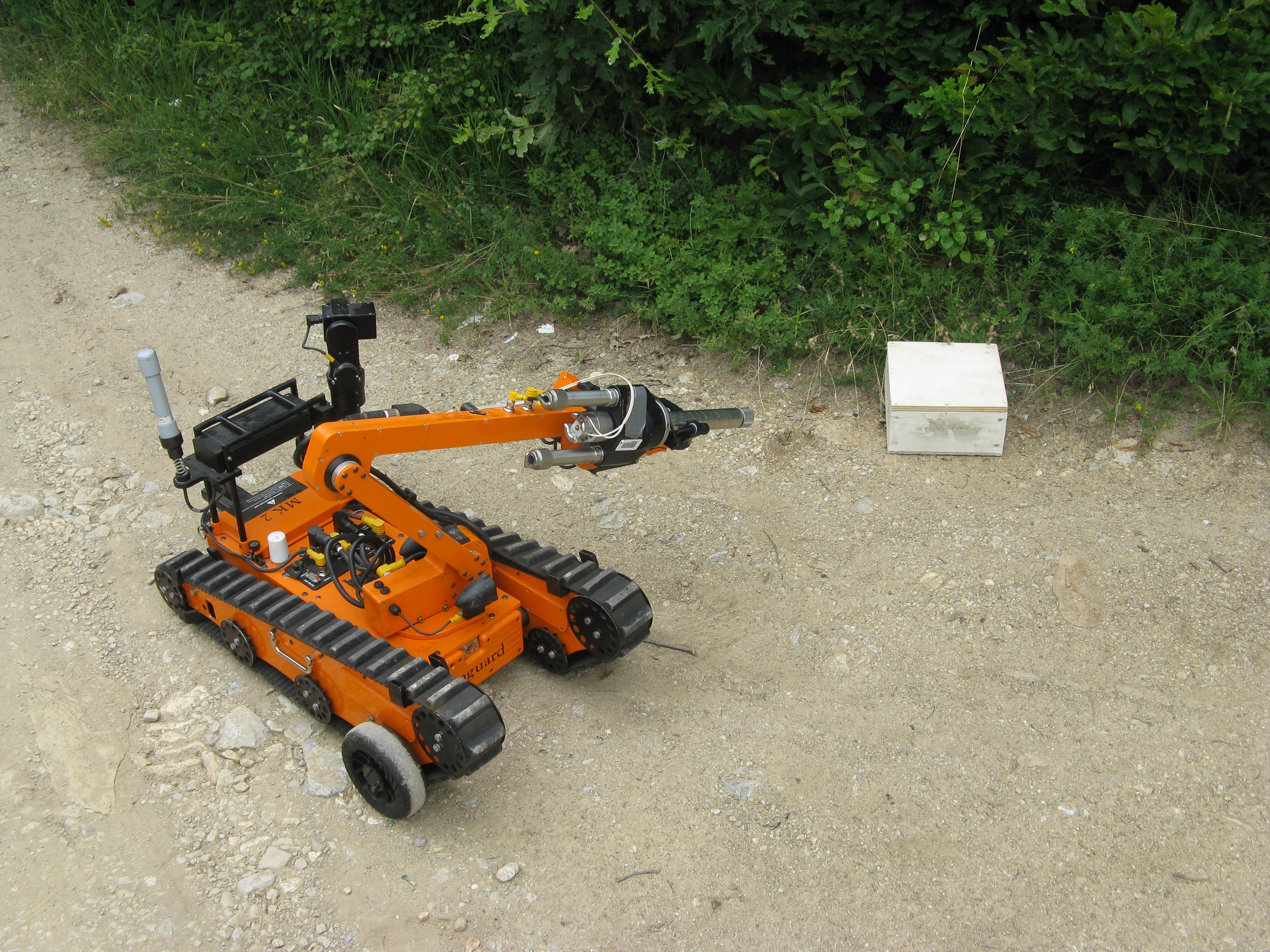

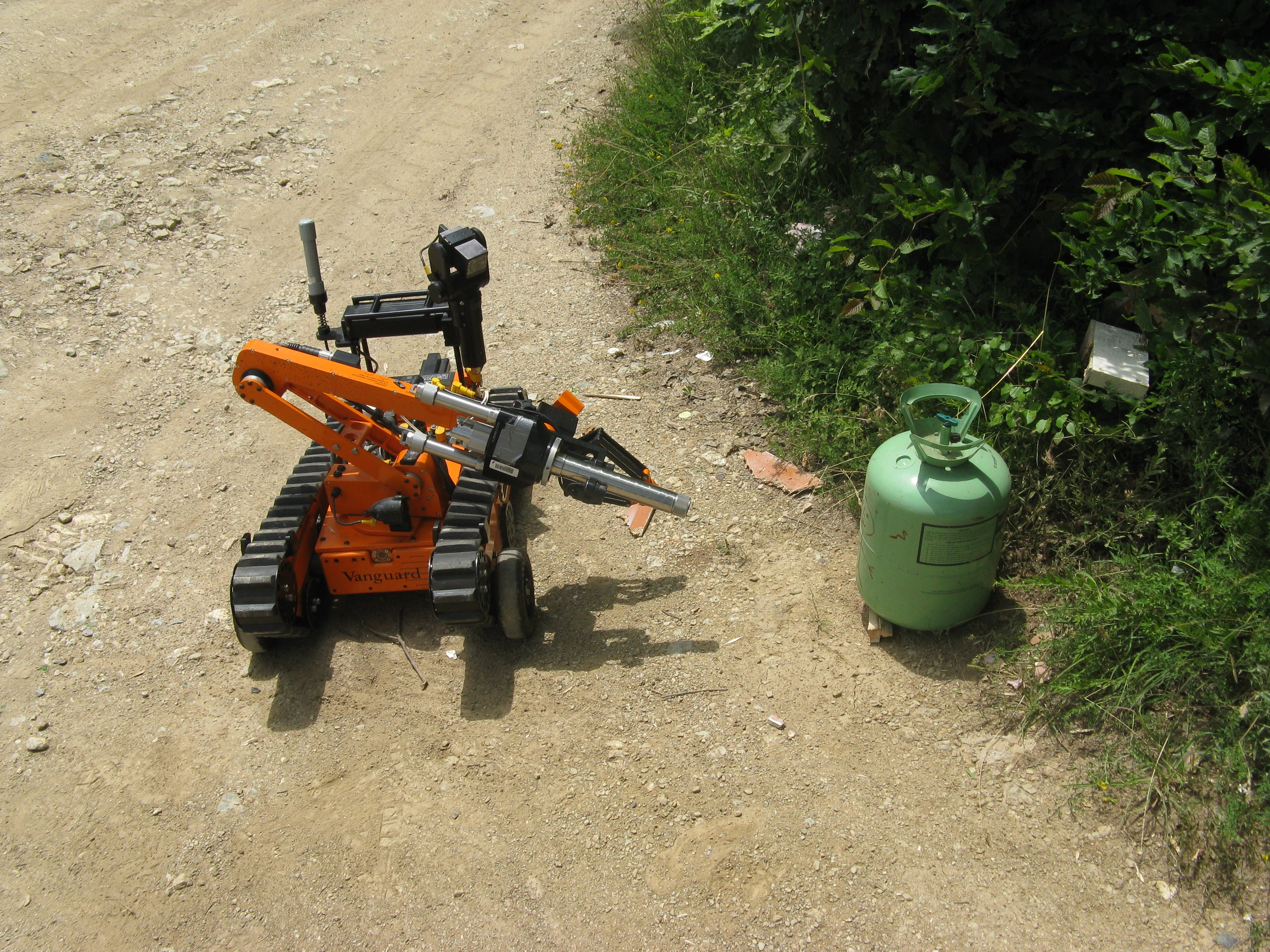

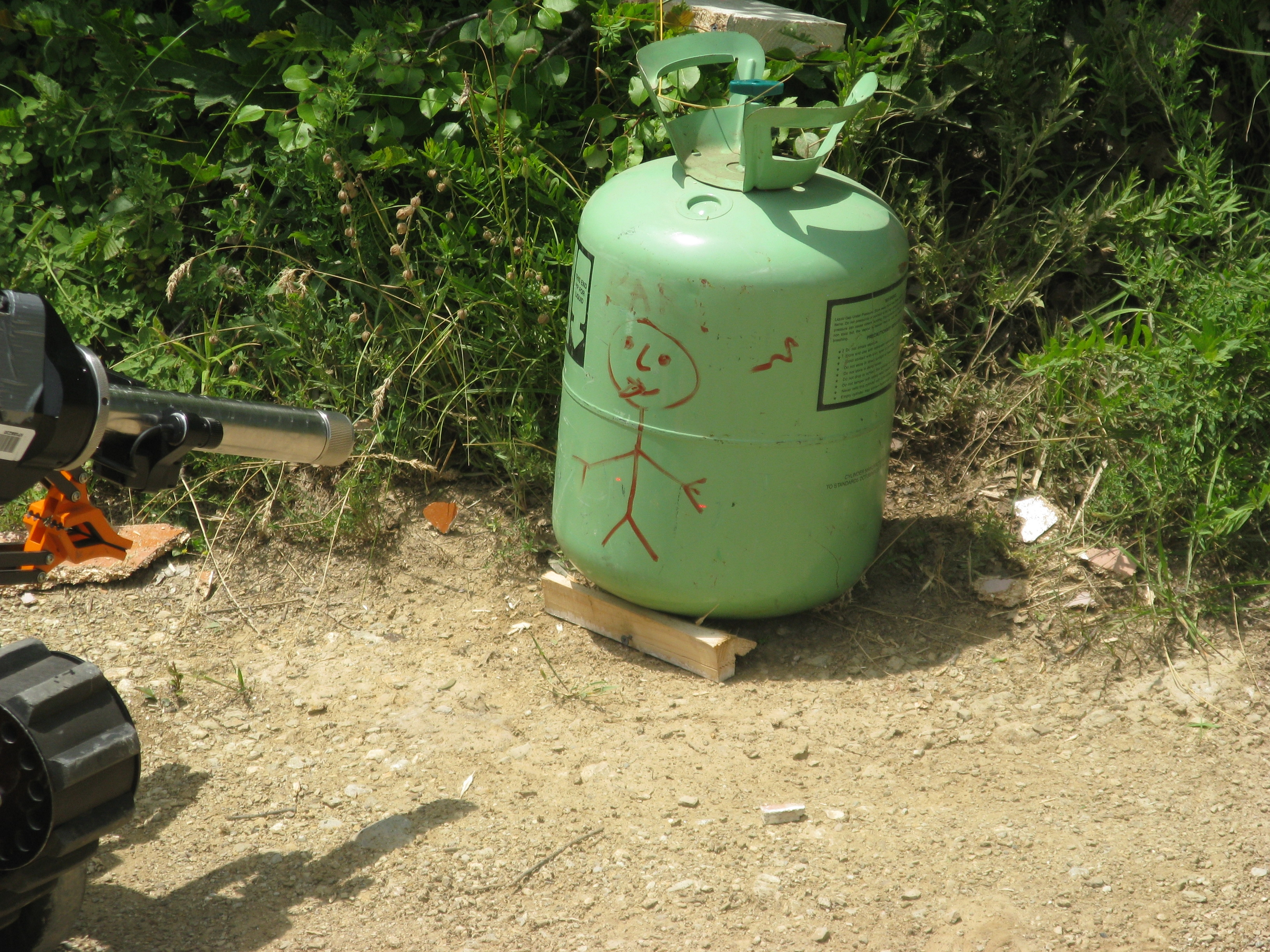

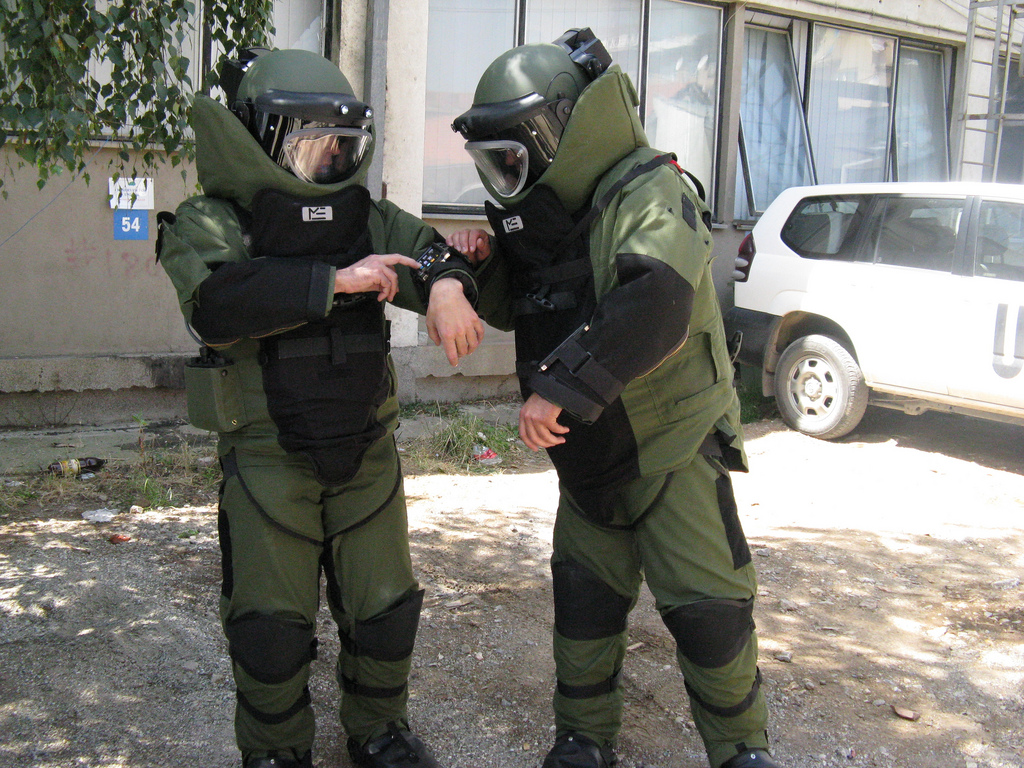

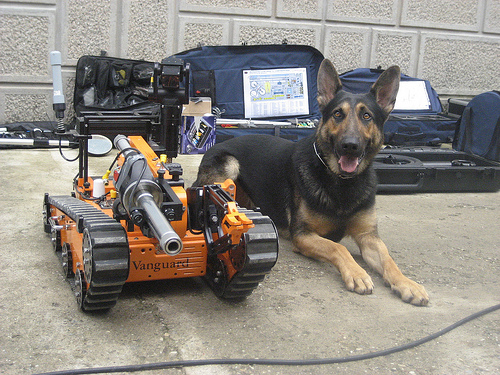

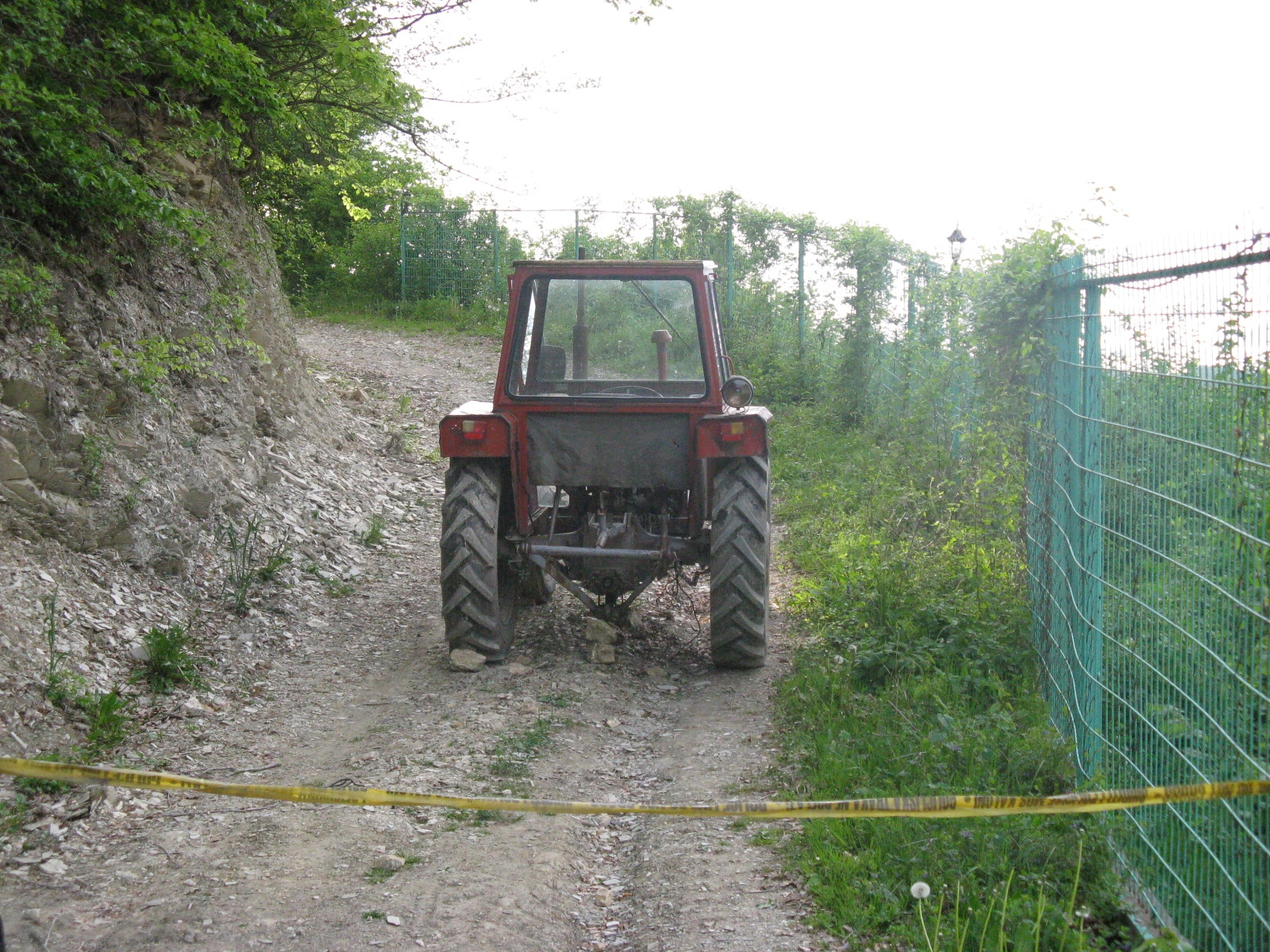

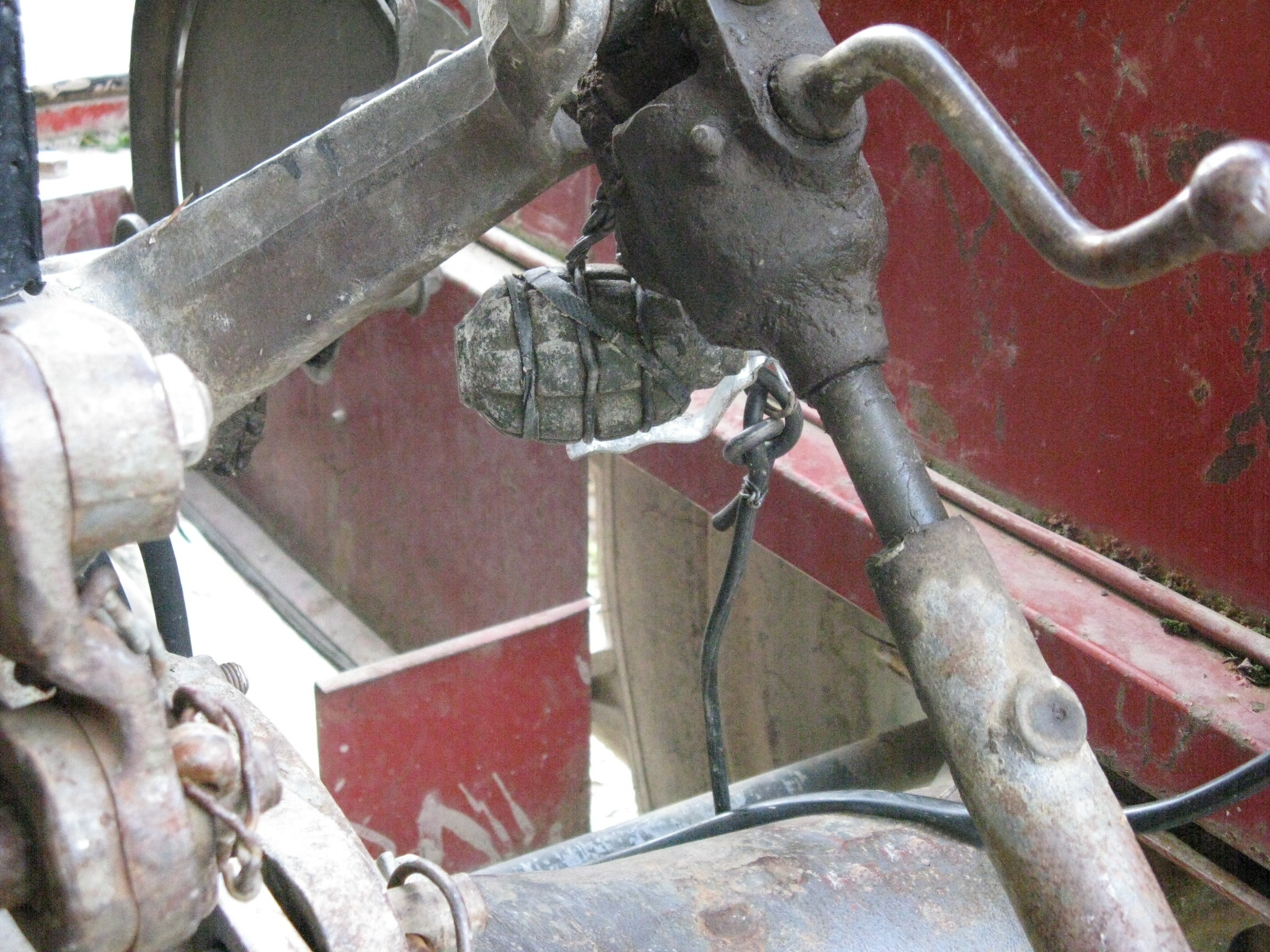

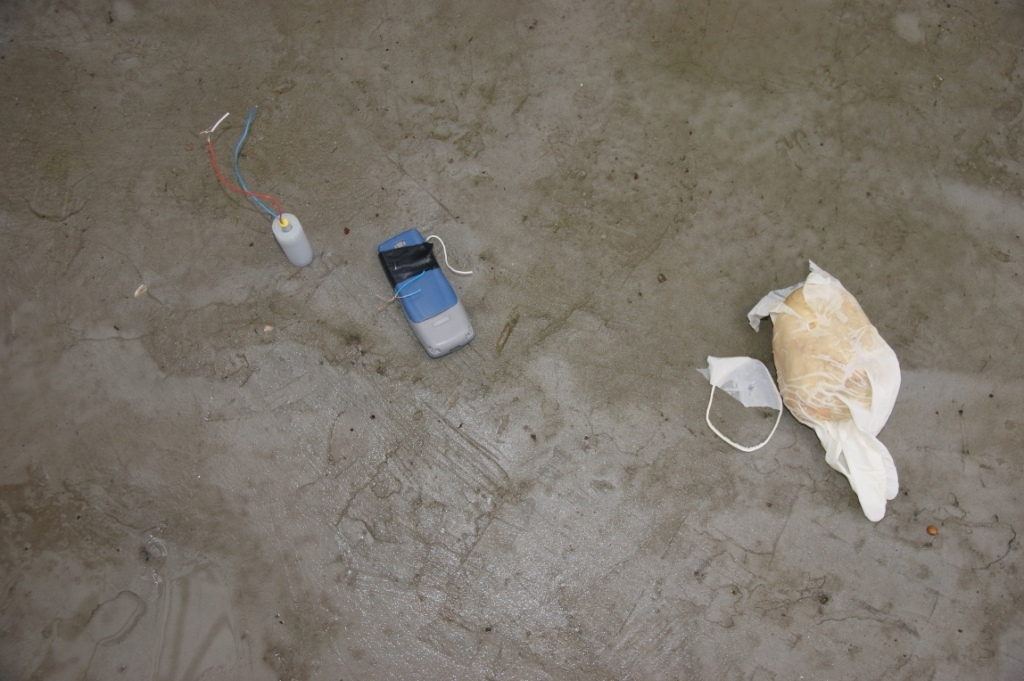

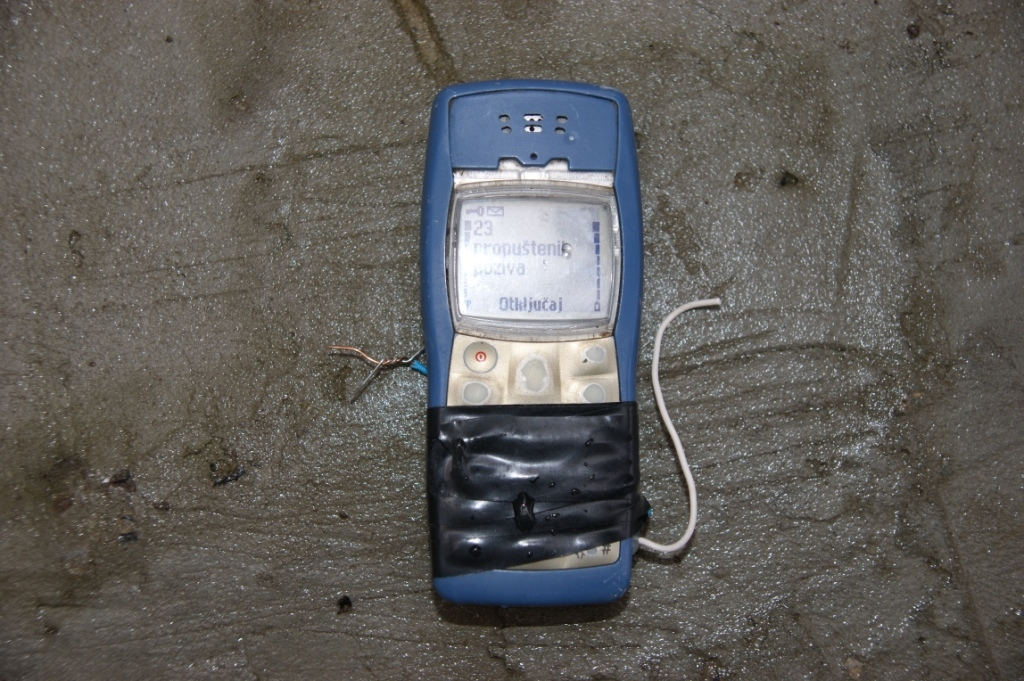

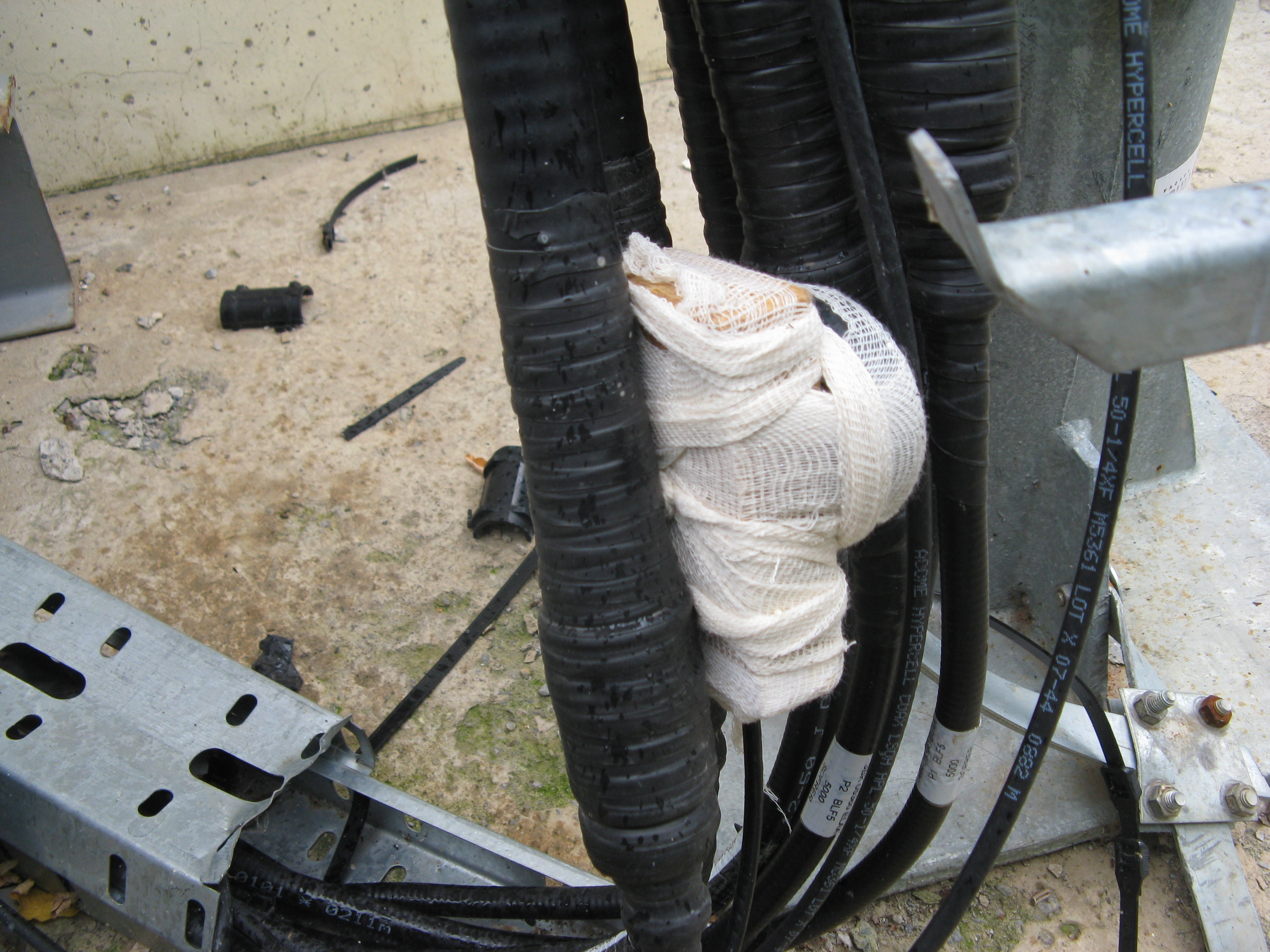

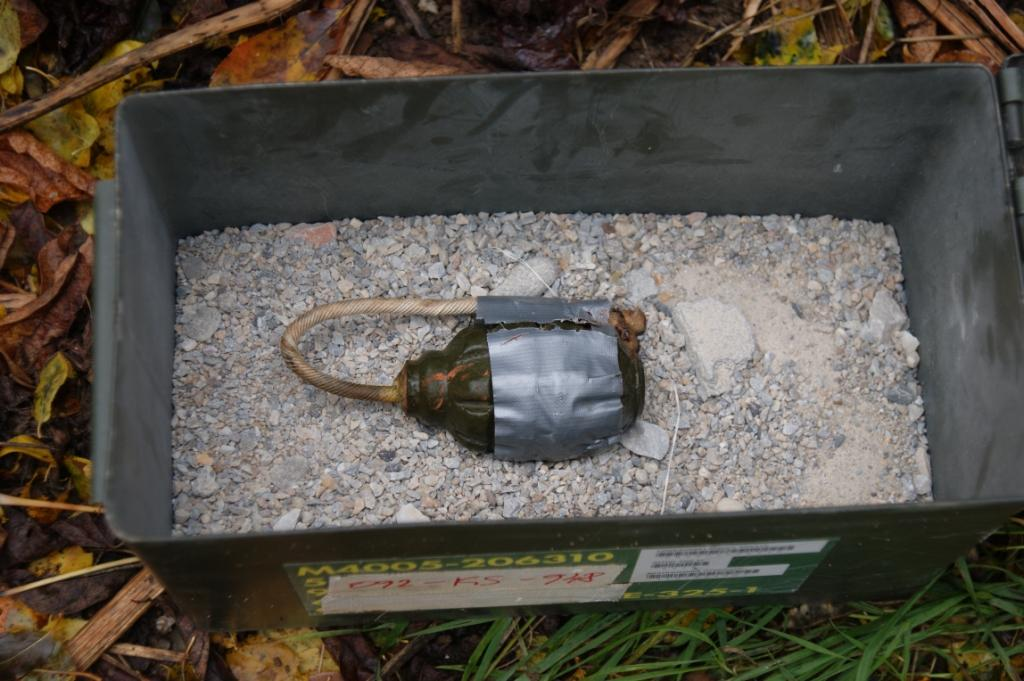

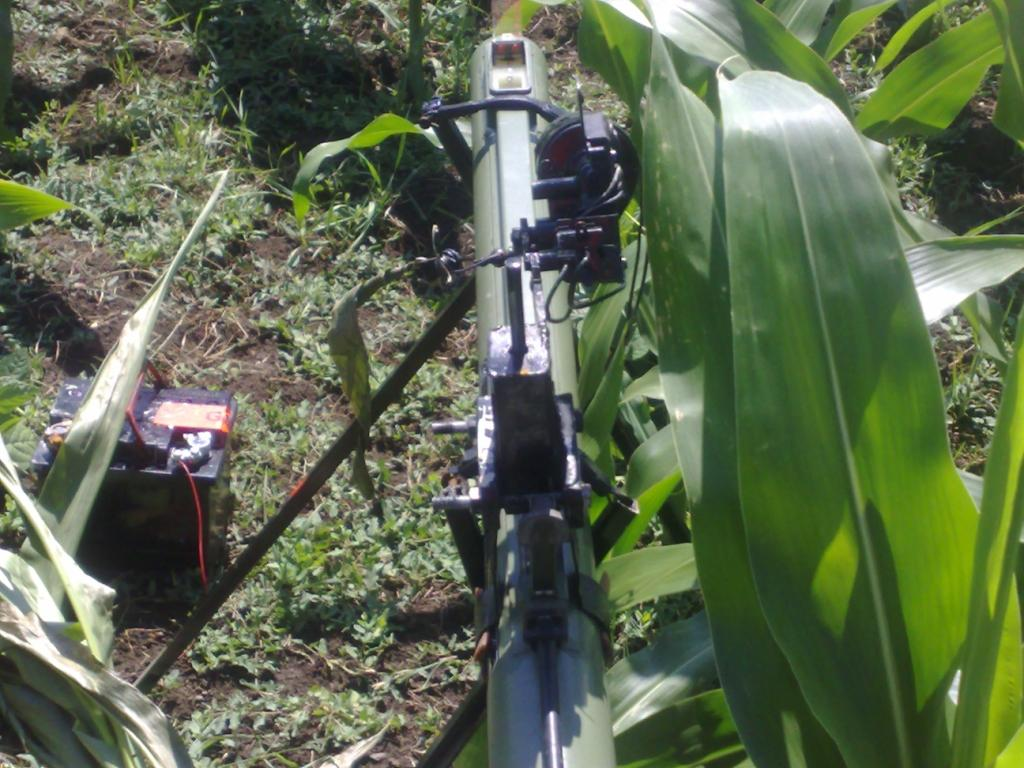

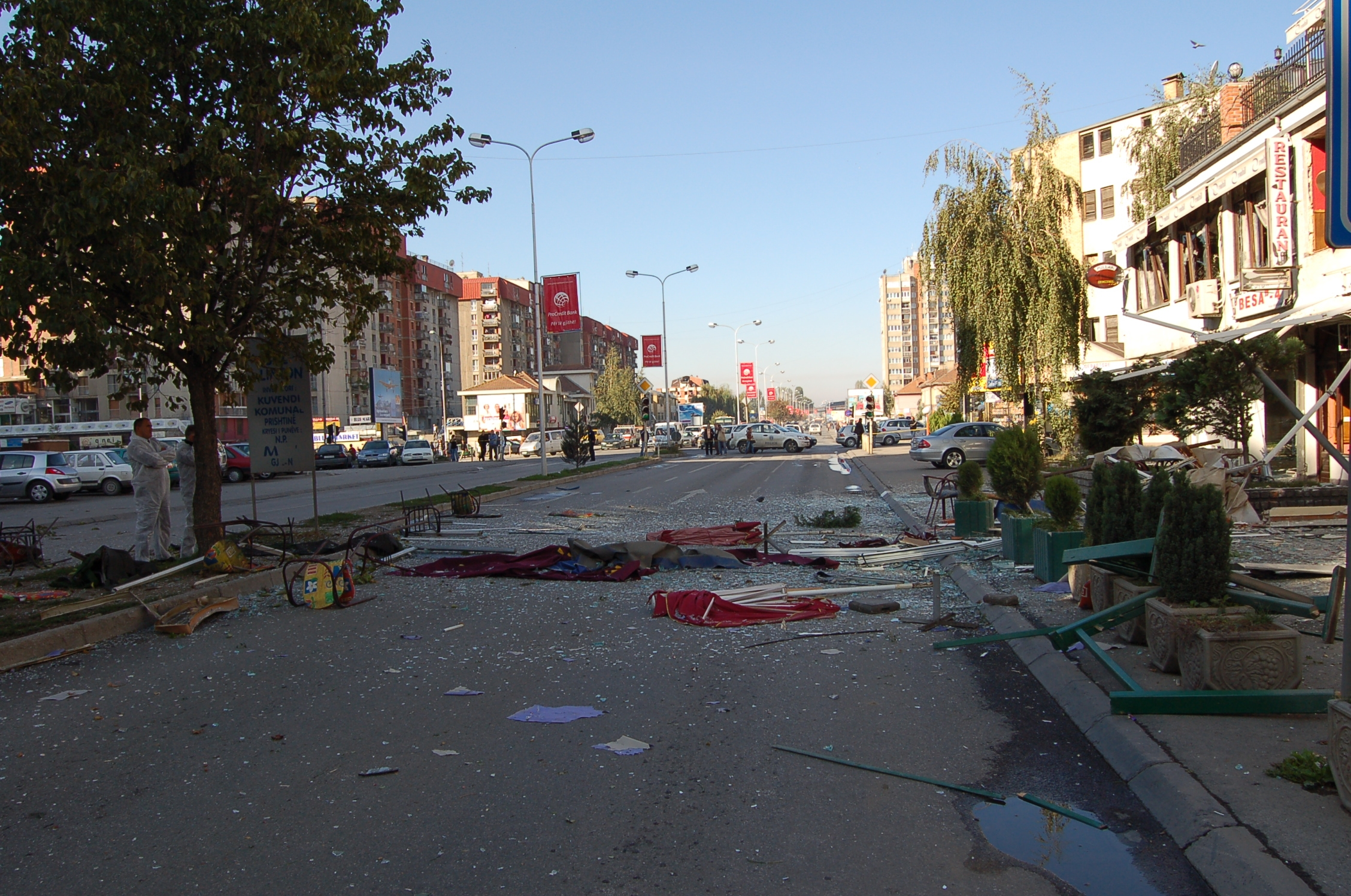

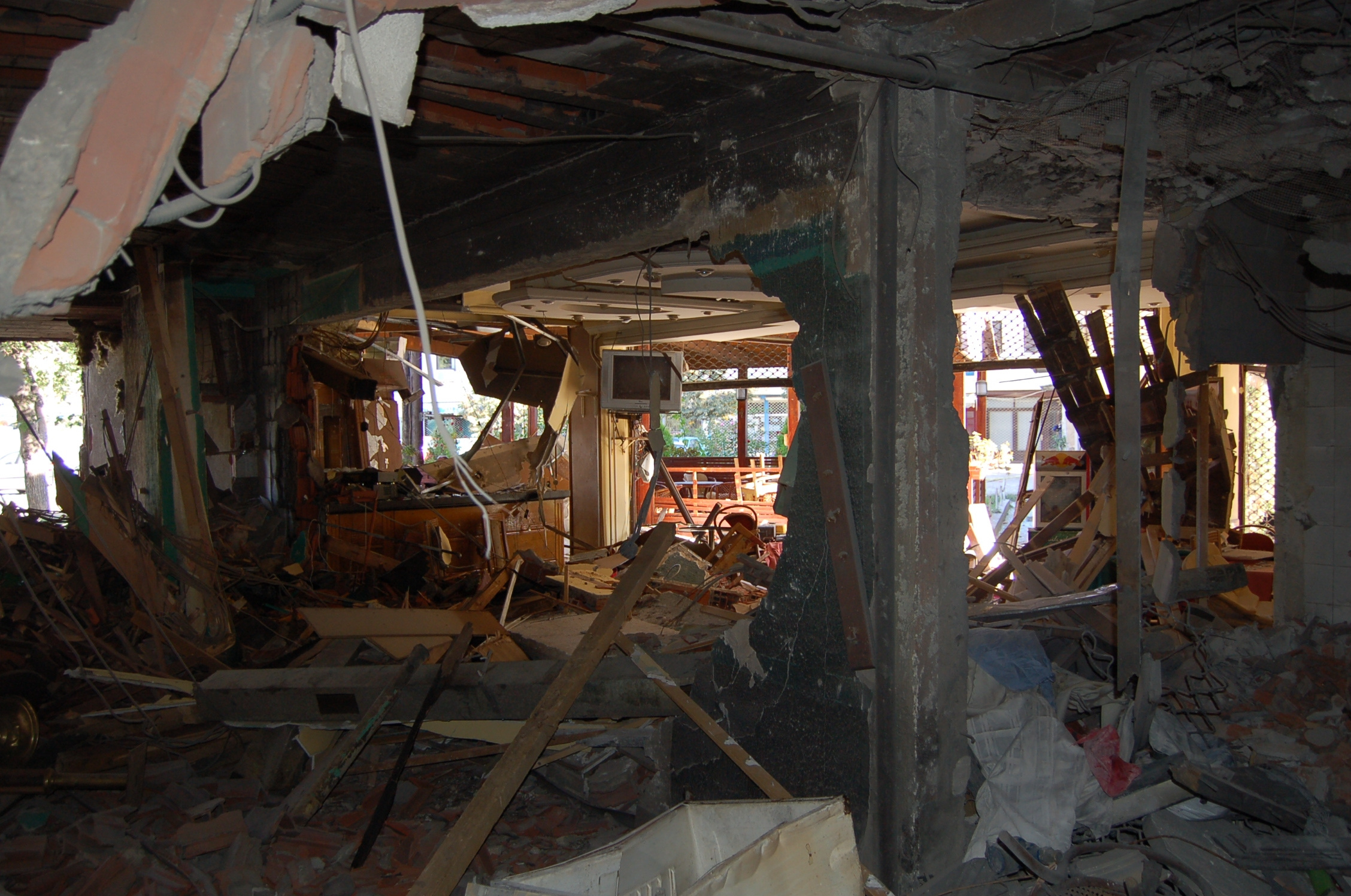

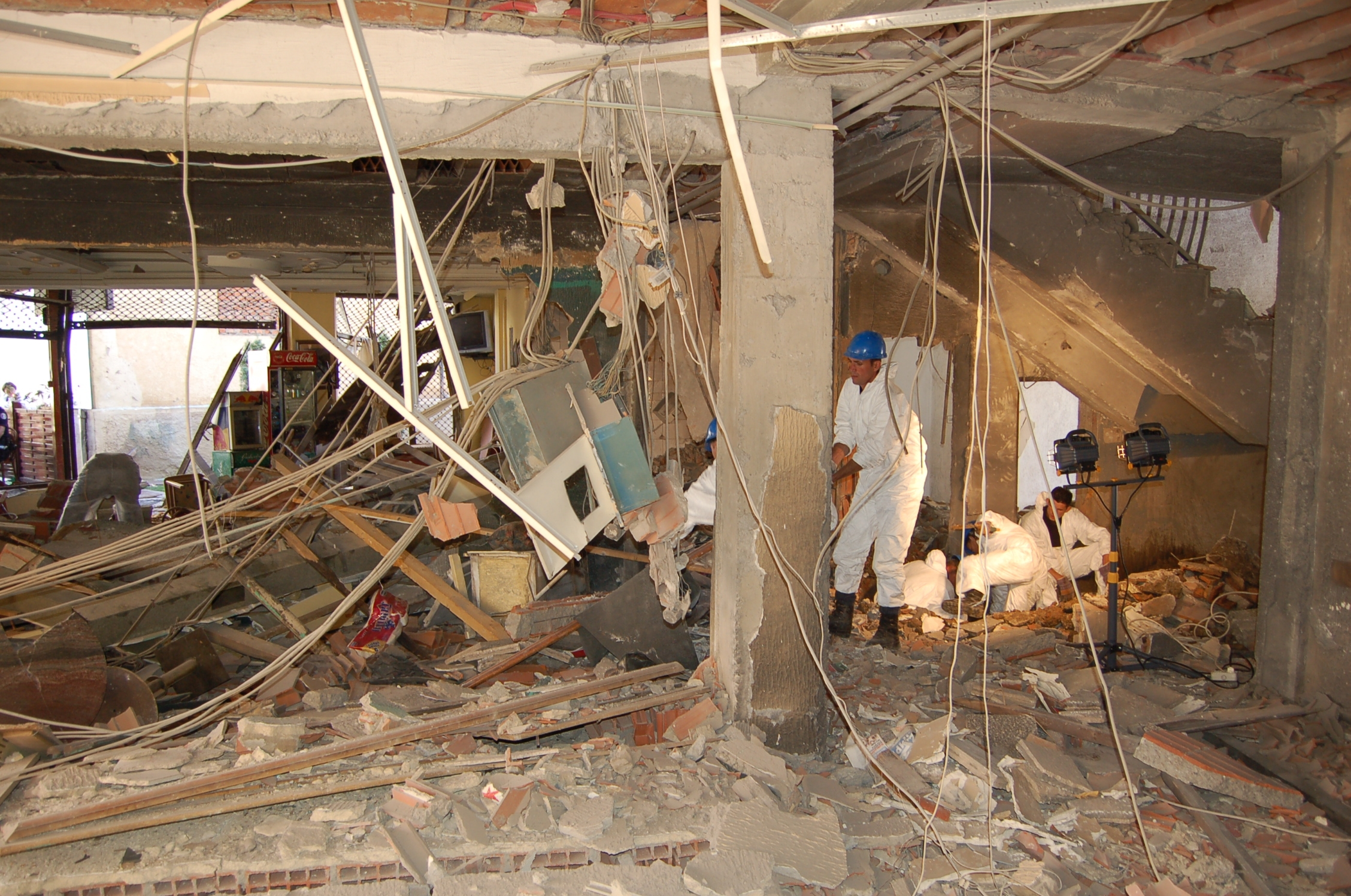

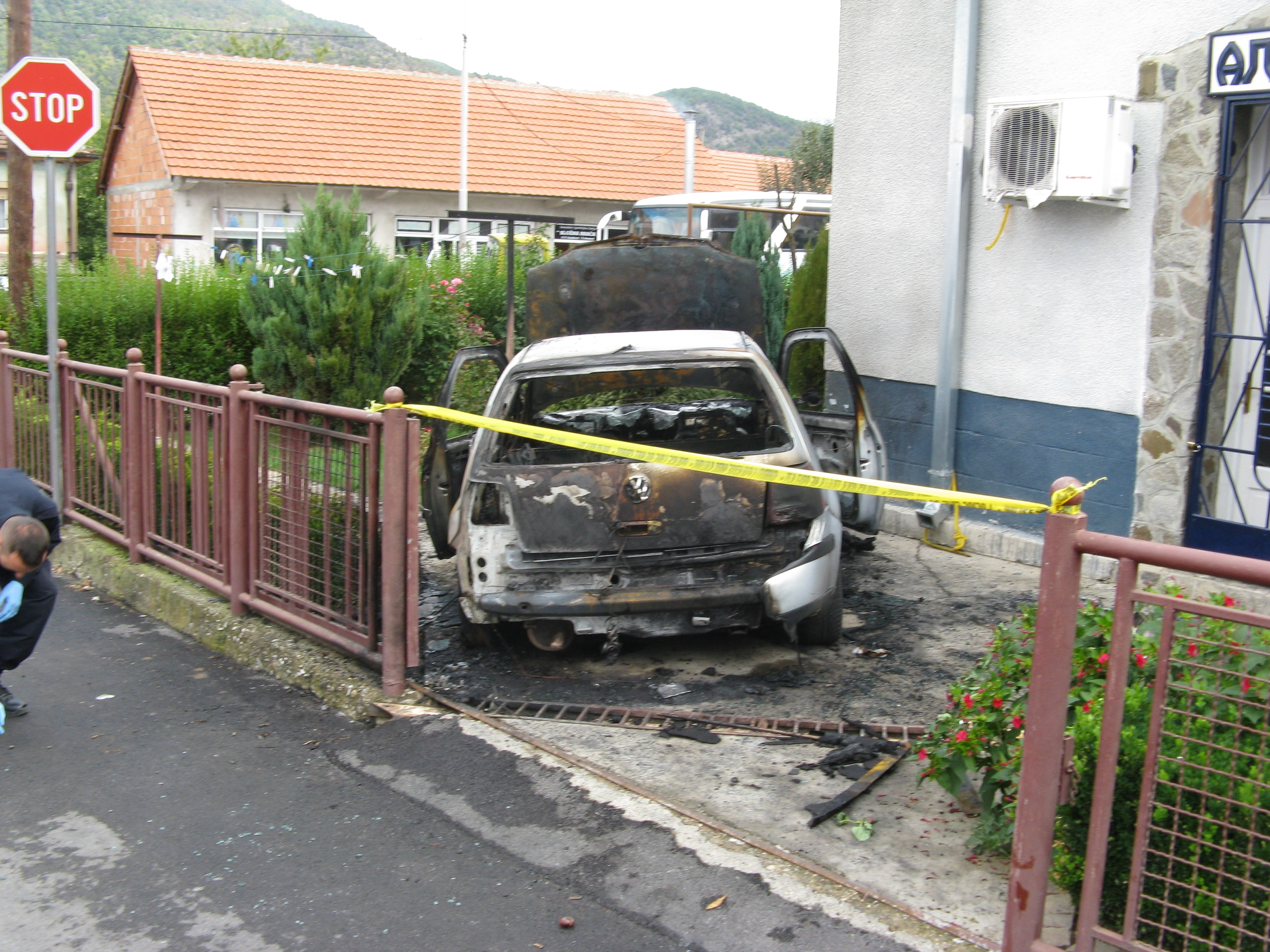

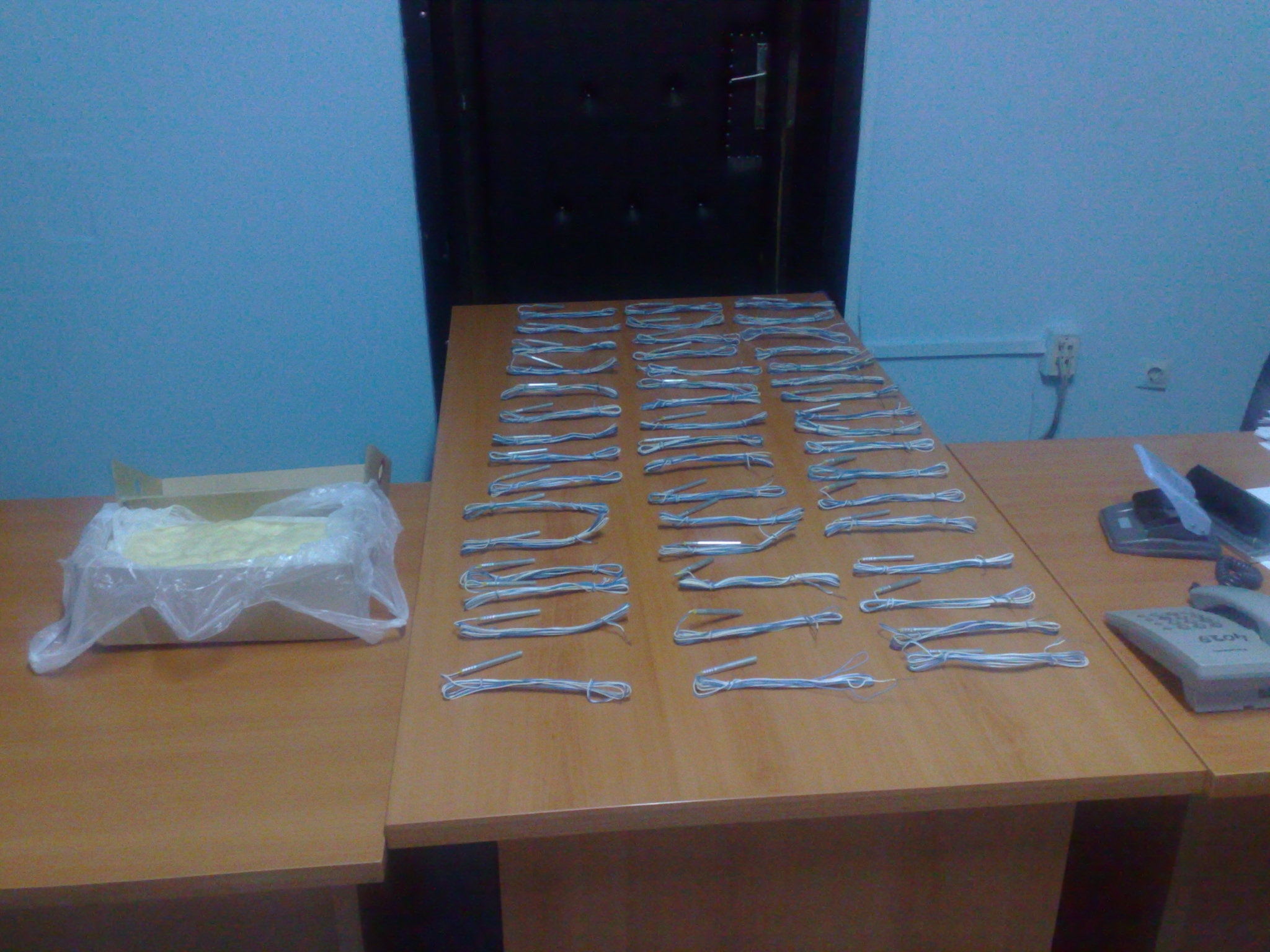
