= Badovc Lake =

Lake in Kosovo

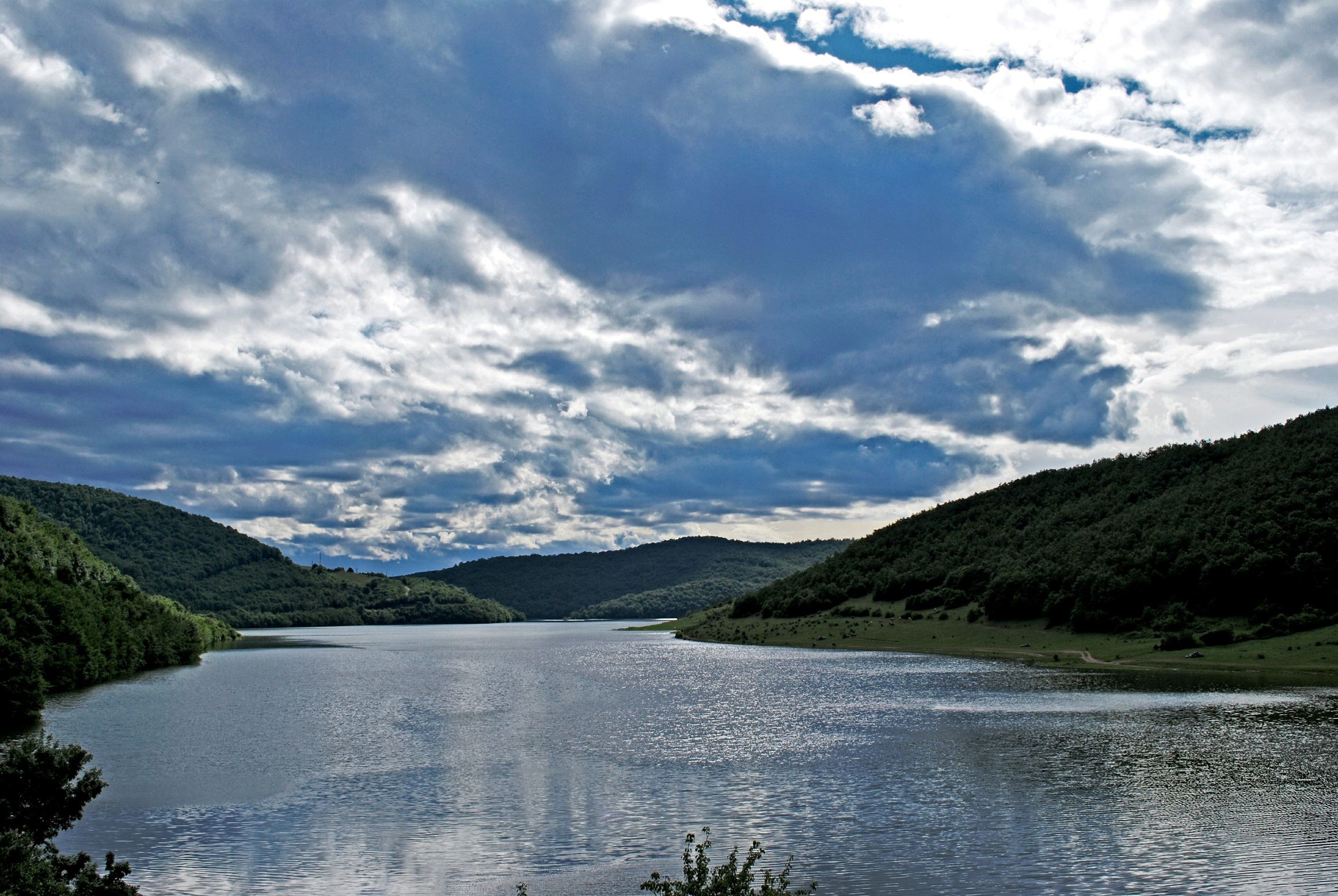

- Location within Kosovo Location within Europe
- Interactive map of Badovc Lake
- Coordinates: 42.6234°N 21.2412°E
- Primary inflows: Gračanka river
- Catchment area: 109 km^{2} (42 sq mi)
- Basin countries: Kosovo
- Max. length: 4.6 km (2.9 mi)
- Max. width: 0.8 km (0.50 mi)
- Surface area: 2.57 km^{2} (0.99 sq mi)
- Max. depth: 29 m (95 ft)
- Surface elevation: 655 m (2,149 ft)
- Islands: 0

Badovc Lake is an artificial reservoir on the river Gračanka, two kilometers above Gračanica, built between 1963 and 1966 to supply the city of Pristina with water. The dam, with a height of 52 m and a width of 246 m, was built in Badovc ravine below Gollak mountains, near the "Rainwater" mine.

When full, the lake is 3.5 kilometres (2.2 mi) long and up to 500 metres (1,600 ft) wide, with a maximum depth of 30 m and a total volume of 26 million cubic meters of water. The lake has a catchment area of 109 km^{2} (42 sq mi). In February 2014, water levels were threatened, due to a very dry winter.

== Gallery ==
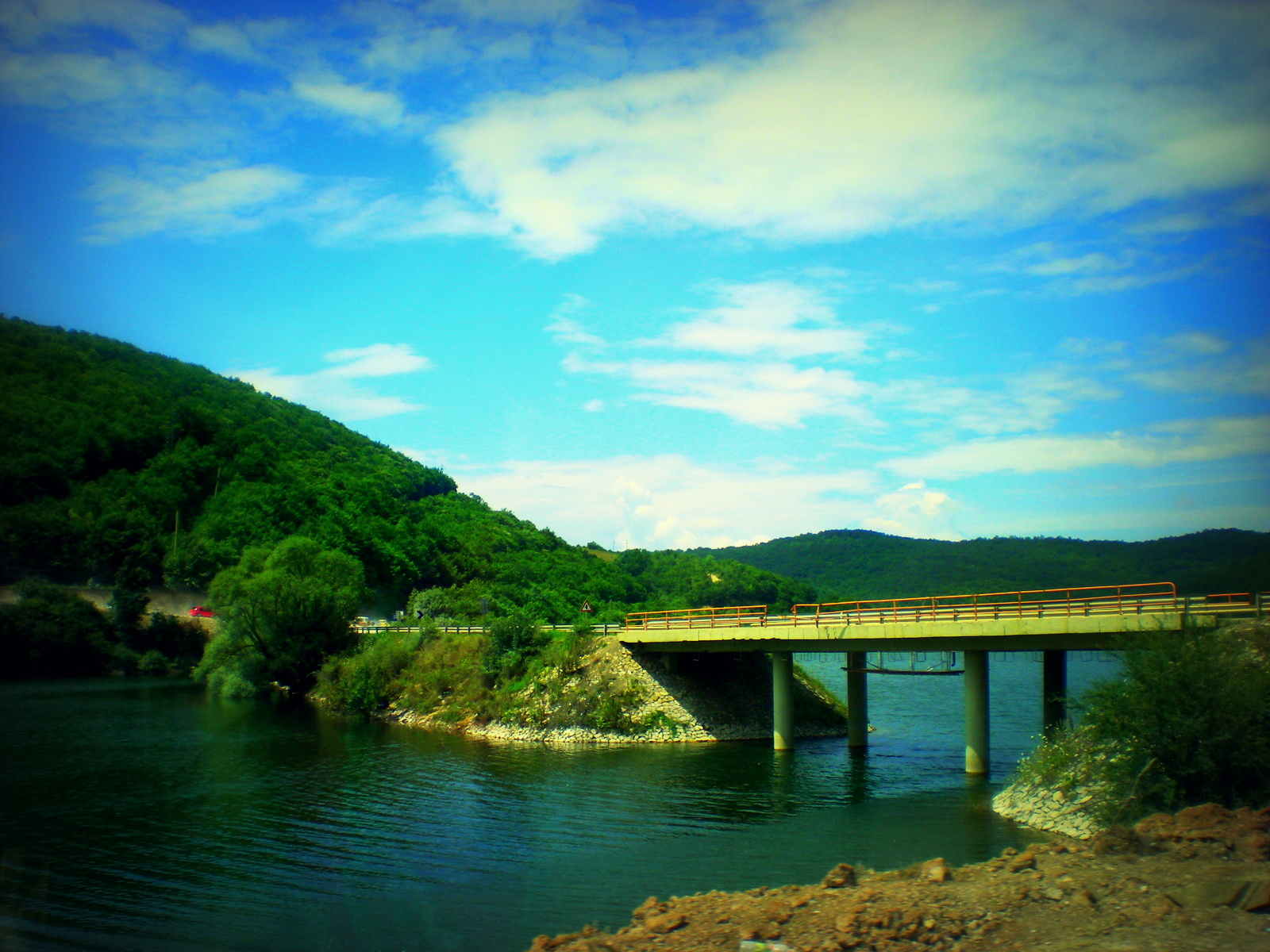
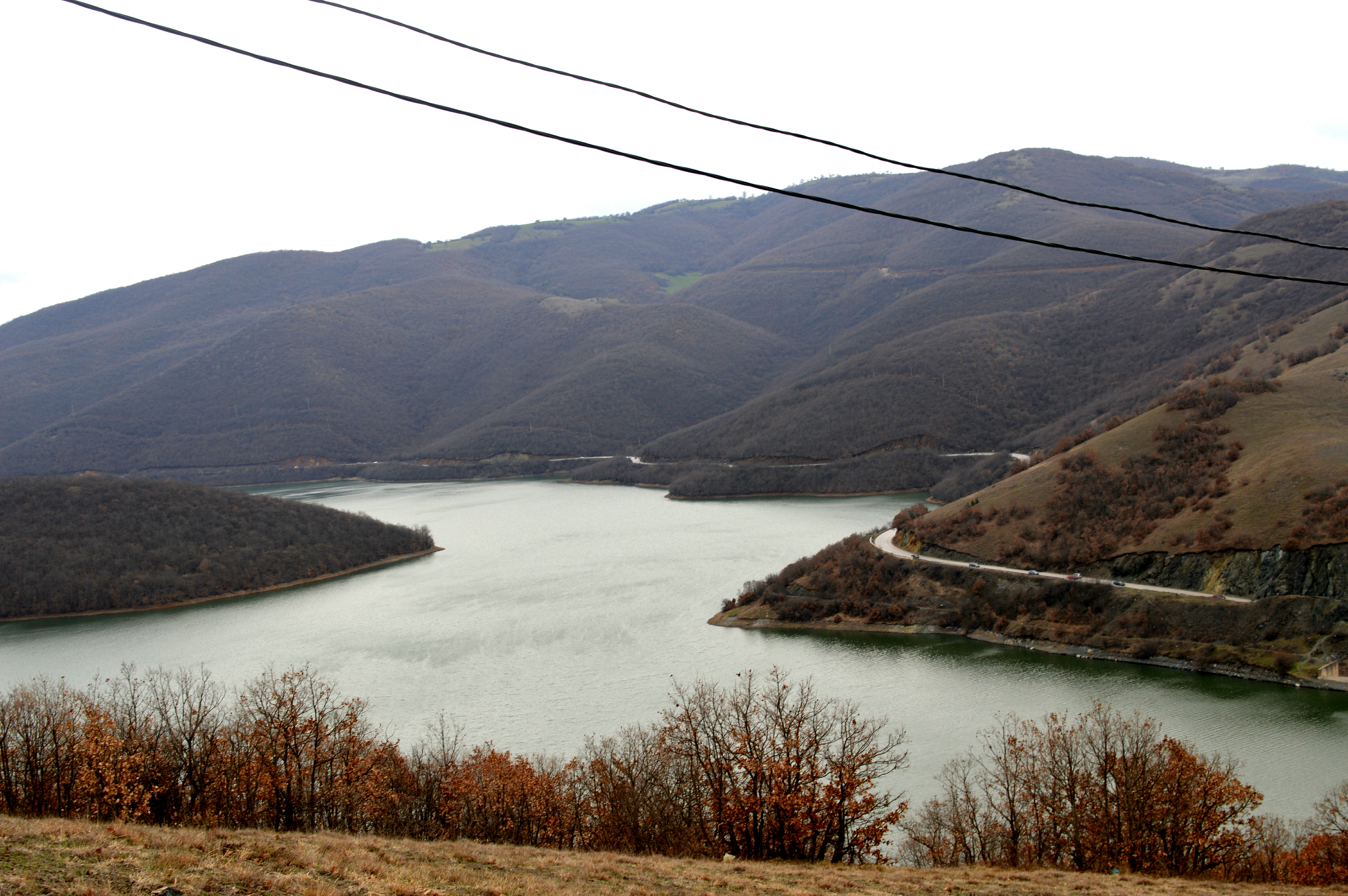
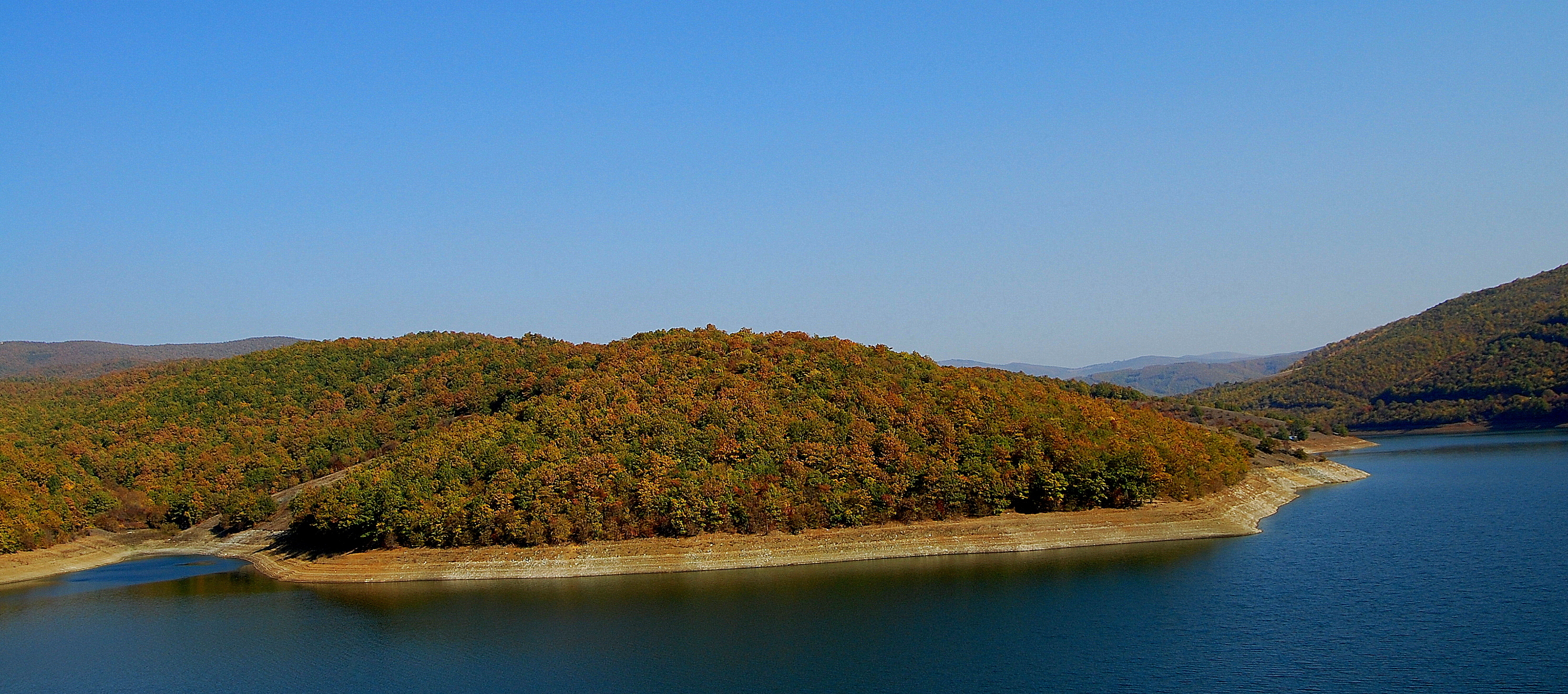

== See also ==
- List of lakes of Kosovo
- Lake Batllava
- Water in Pristina
