= Boscë =

Boscë Босце
- Village
- Interactive map of Boscë
- Country: Kosovo
- District: Gjilan
- Municipality: Kamenica

Population (2024)
  - Total: 105
- Time zone: UTC+1
  - Summer (DST): UTC+2

Boscë (Serbian Cyrillic: Босце) is a village in Kamenica municipality, Kosovo. It is located in the Gollak mountains.

== Demographics ==
As of 2024, the village has 105 inhabitants.
