= Gogolloc =

Gogolloc Гоголовце
- Village
- Country: Kosovo
- District: Gjilan
- Municipality: Kamenica

Population (2024)
  - Total: 11
- Time zone: UTC+1
  - Summer (DST): UTC+2

Gogolloc (Serbian Cyrillic: Гоголовце ) is a village in Kamenica municipality, Kosovo. It is located in the Gollak mountains. It has 11 inhabitants.
