= Gmicë =

Gmicë Гминце
- Village
- Country: Kosovo
- District: Gjilan
- Municipality: Kamenica

Population (2024)
  - Total: 12
- Time zone: UTC+1
  - Summer (DST): UTC+2

Gmicë (Serbian Cyrillic: Гминце) is a village in Kamenica municipality, Kosovo. It is located in the Gollak mountains.

== History ==
The village of Gmicë is documented with the written form Dminzi in Hogoste since the first half of the 15th century (1437). However, in 1455 it appears with the Dimçe form and the Diminica variant as a village of the Topolnica Vilayet. In the census of 1566-74 it appears in the form Dimnofc as a village of the Leskofc Vilayet. In the Vilayet of Kosovo of 1896 it appears as Gamençe.

== Demographics ==
As of 2011 it has 85 inhabitants, all of whom are Albanian.
