= Bratilloc =

Bratilloc Братиловце
- Village
- Interactive map of Bratilloc
- Country: Kosovo
- District: Gjilan
- Municipality: Kamenica

Population (2024)
  - Total: 10
- Time zone: UTC+1
  - Summer (DST): UTC+2

Bratilloc (Serbian Cyrillic: Братиловце) is a village in Kamenica municipality, Kosovo. It is located in the Gollak mountains.

== Demographics ==
As of 2024, the village has 10 inhabitants.
