= Feriqevë =

Feriqevë Firićeja
- Village
- Interactive map of Feriqevë
- Country: Kosovo
- District: Gjilan
- Municipality: Kamenica

Population (2024)
  - Total: 14
- Time zone: UTC+1
  - Summer (DST): UTC+2

Feriqevë (Albanian definite form: Feriqeva) or Firićeja (Serbian Cyrillic: Фирићеја), is a village in Kamenica municipality, Kosovo. It is located in the Gollak mountains. It has 14 inhabitants, all of whom are Albanian.
