= Gragjenik =

Gragjenik Грађеник
- Village
- Interactive map of Gragjenik
- Country: Kosovo
- District: Gjilan
- Municipality: Kamenica

Population (2024)
  - Total: 0
- Time zone: UTC+1
  - Summer (DST): UTC+2

Gragjenik (Serbian Cyrillic: Грађеник) is a village in Kamenica municipality, Kosovo. It is located in the Gollak mountains. As of 2011 it has two inhabitants, both of whom are Albanian.

== Etymology ==
In all likelihood, it seems that the name of this village comes from the widespread aristocratic surname Gradenigo / Gradeniko with an expected metaphony of / a / followed by / e / and with a re-treatment based on the folk etymology by the Slavic population.

== History ==
It is documented in the form Ogragjenik since the first census of 1455 as a village of the Topolnica Vilayet with Serbian population. On the map of 1530 it appears in the form Okraknik as the village of Nahija Kremenat. However, it seems that in Topolnica in the census of 1555-64 it is encountered in the form Kragjia.
