= Gjyrishec =

Gjyrishec Ђуришевце
- Village
- Country: Kosovo
- District: Gjilan
- Municipality: Kamenica

Population (2024)
  - Total: 14
- Time zone: UTC+1
  - Summer (DST): UTC+2

Gjyrishec (Serbian Cyrillic: Ђуришевце) is a village in Kamenica municipality, Kosovo. It is located in the Gollak mountains.

== Etymology ==
The earliest forms of evidence of this settlement push us to obtain it from the Albanian appellation ‘stone’, which in the form of Gurash is frequent in Albanian anthroponymy and patronage.

== History ==
It is mentioned for the first time in 1437 in the book of sailors by Mikel Lukarevič in the form Guraseuzi, and a year later, in addition to this form, it also appears in the forms Gurauseuzi and Gurauxeuzi. In the map of 1530 it appears in the form Gurashofça, while in the census of 1566-74 it is mentioned as Gjurashofc. In both of these documents it appears as a village of the Nahije of Leskofça.

== Demographics ==
As of 2011 it has 58 inhabitants, all of whom are Albanian.
