= Dashnicë =

Dashnicë Даздинце
- Village
- Country: Kosovo
- District: Gjilan
- Municipality: Kamenica

Population (2024)
  - Total: 19
- Time zone: UTC+1
  - Summer (DST): UTC+2

Dashnicë (Serbian Cyrillic: Даздинце) is a village in Kamenica municipality, Kosovo. It is located in the Gollak mountains.

== Etymology ==
The form Dashnica or Dazhnica came from the prefix Dashtn-icë, which also explains its documented form Dazhdaniça or Dazhdince with an anaptotic sound / a / or / i / in the Ottoman or Slavic form.

== History ==
For the first time the name of this village is mentioned with the registration of the years 1566-74 in the form Dazhdaniça as a village of the region of Topolonica.

== Demographics ==
The village, as of 2011, has 80 inhabitants. 77 of them are Albanians, 1 is a Bosniak and 2 others.
