= Gjilan bus station =

Bus station in Gjilan, Kosovo

The bus station is located in the city of Gjilan, Kosovo. The bus station offers services for Pristina, Kamenice and Ferizaj.

Transportation is also organized for travellers outside the state of Kosovo.

As of 2025, the bus station building is under construction. The value of the project is estimated at 1 million euros.
