= Veli Dedi =

Albanian general

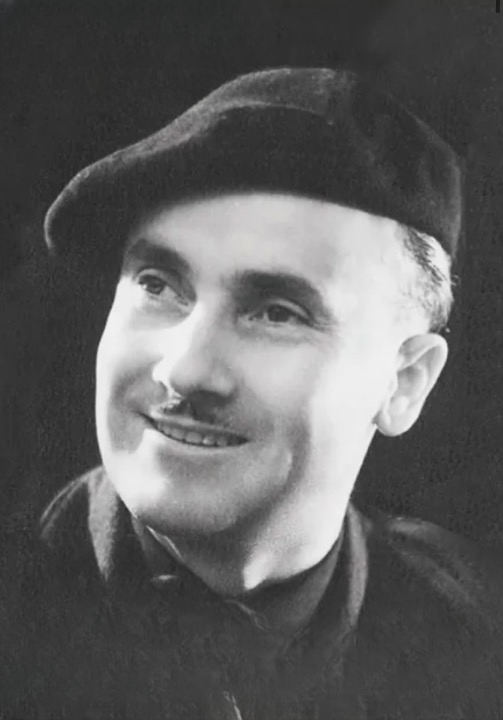
- Born: Veli Musa Dedi; 5 April 1912; Medveđa, Kingdom of Serbia
- Died: 3 February 1995 (aged 82); Tirana, Albania
- Military career
- Allegiance: Albania; Spanish Republic
- Branch: LANÇ; International Brigades; Albanian People's Army
- Rank: General, Commander
- Conflicts: Spanish Civil War; World War II in France; Battle of Marseille; Cold War; Greek Civil War
- Awards: Hero of the People

Veli Musa Dedi (5 April 1912 – 3 February 1995) was an Albanian general, notable for serving as the Technical Director of the Albanian People's Army and commanding the garrison of Tirana. He played a significant role in the Spanish Civil War and served in France during World War II, notably participating in the Battle of Marseille in 1944.

== Life ==
Veli Dedi was an ethnic Albanian, born in the village Dediq which belongs to the district of Medveđa that is located in the region of Gollak. He attended primary school in Medveđa and Gazdare, secondary school in Leskoc and Faculty of Engineering in Belgrade. In 1932, at the age of 20, he came to Albania and graduated from the Royal Military School in Tirana.

== Participation in the Spanish and French War ==
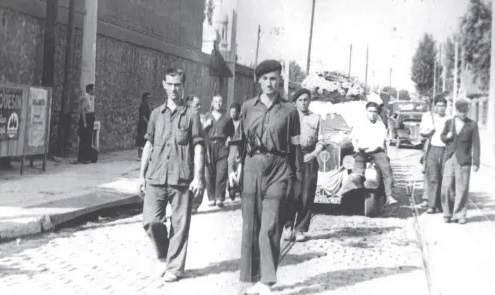
Veli Dedi in the Spanish Civil War

During the Spanish Civil War he carried out the duty of operational chief of pioneers of Brigade XV. Later on he fled to France where he joined the French resistance forces by fighting in the Battle of Marseille, and in August 1944, he was promoted to Major and Veli Dedi, thanks to his ability, surrendered to 37 thousand fascists, who were fighting to destroy the whole of Marseilles. He managed to persuade them to surrender thanks to the recognition of all international conventions in a professional and detailed manner and with the security guaranteed by the French units. Veli Dedi was also a member of the French Communist Party.

== Death ==
On February 3, 1995, Major General Veli Dedi died in Tirana. Dedi was awarded a state funeral, as an experienced combatant of Spain and as commander of the liberation operations of the Department of Marseille, as a loyal soldier of the Albanian nation, and as a long-time deputy of the Bajram Curri district. The telegrams from the President, the Ministry of Defense and Albania's veterans were read at the funeral service. Veli Dedi also received an award as Hero of the People
