= Hodonoc =

Hodonoc: Hodonoc (Albanian); Одановце/Odanovce (Serbian)
- Village
- Location within Kosovo
- Coordinates: 42.538090°N 21.678884°E
- Location: Kosovo
- District: Gjilan
- Municipality: Kamenicë

Population (2024)
  - Total: 1,258
- Time zone: UTC+1 (Central European Time)
  - Summer (DST): UTC+2 (CEST)

Hodonoc is a village in the Kamenicë municipality, eastern Kosovo.
