= Vrućevce Mosque =

Mosque in Vrućevce, Kamenica, Kosovo

- Xhamia në Vryqec (Albanian)
- Location: Vrućevce, Kamenica, Kosovo

History
- Built: 1826

The Vrućevce Mosque (Albanian: Xhamia në Vryqec) is a cultural heritage monument built in 1826 in Vrućevce, Kamenica, Kosovo. Built of clay-mortared stone, the mosque lies halfway between Vrućevce and Marovce, and the two villages share it as a place of worship. There is no minaret.

== Description ==
The mosque is unusual in that the prayer hall is dual, with two rooms on either side of a narrow central corridor. One side room is for the imam to preach, the other serves as lodgings for imams from another village. the 70-cm-thick stone wall and the low height of the building speaks to its unusually recent construction, though the hall's interior is relatively standard.
