= Zenel =

Zenel is a given name. Notable people with the given name include:

- Zenel Bastari (c. 1767–c. 1837), Albanian poet
- Zenel Gjoleka (1805–1852), Albanian revolutionary fighter
- Zenel Hajdini (1910–1942), Albanian partisan
