= Zuzaku =

- Village
- Location in Kosovo
- Location: Kosovo
- District: Gjilan
- Municipality: Kamenicë
- Time zone: UTC+1 (CET)
  - Summer (DST): UTC+2 (CEST)

Zuzaku is a populated place in the Kamenicë municipality, Kosovo.
