= Koretin =

Koretin: Koretin (Albanian); Коретин/Koretin (Serbian)
- Village
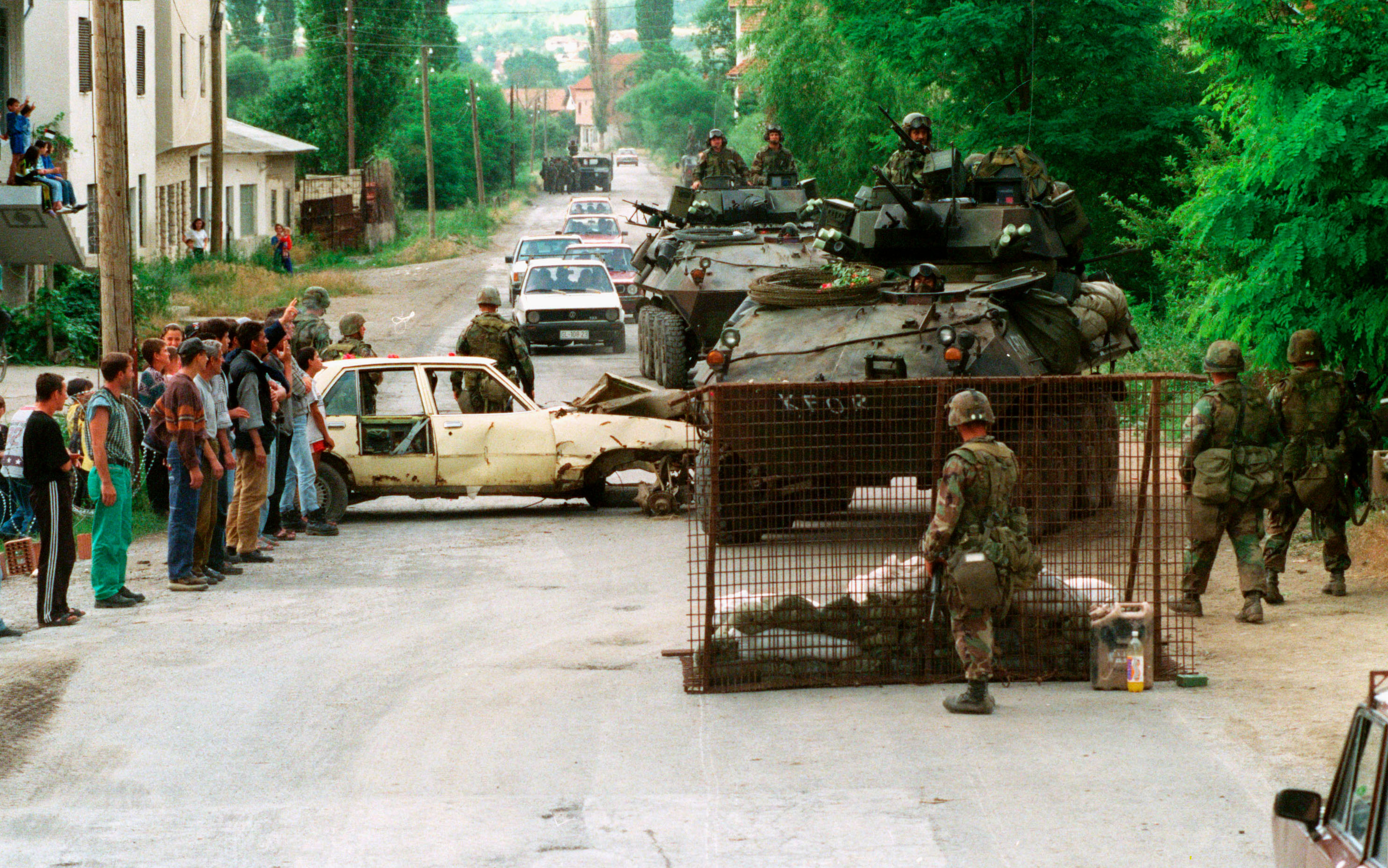
- U.S. Marines from the 2nd Light Armored Reconnaissance Battalion set up a road block to check for weapons near the village of Koretin, Kosovo, on June 16, 1999

- Location within Kosovo
- Coordinates: 42.550019°N 21.597209°E
- Location: Kosovo
- District: Gjilan
- Municipality: Kamenicë

Population (2024)
  - Total: 2,266
- Time zone: UTC+1 (Central European Time)
  - Summer (DST): UTC+2 (CEST)

Koretin is a village in the Kamenicë municipality, eastern Kosovo.
