= Dardana Fortress =

Archaeological site Kosovo

- Kalaja e Dardanës
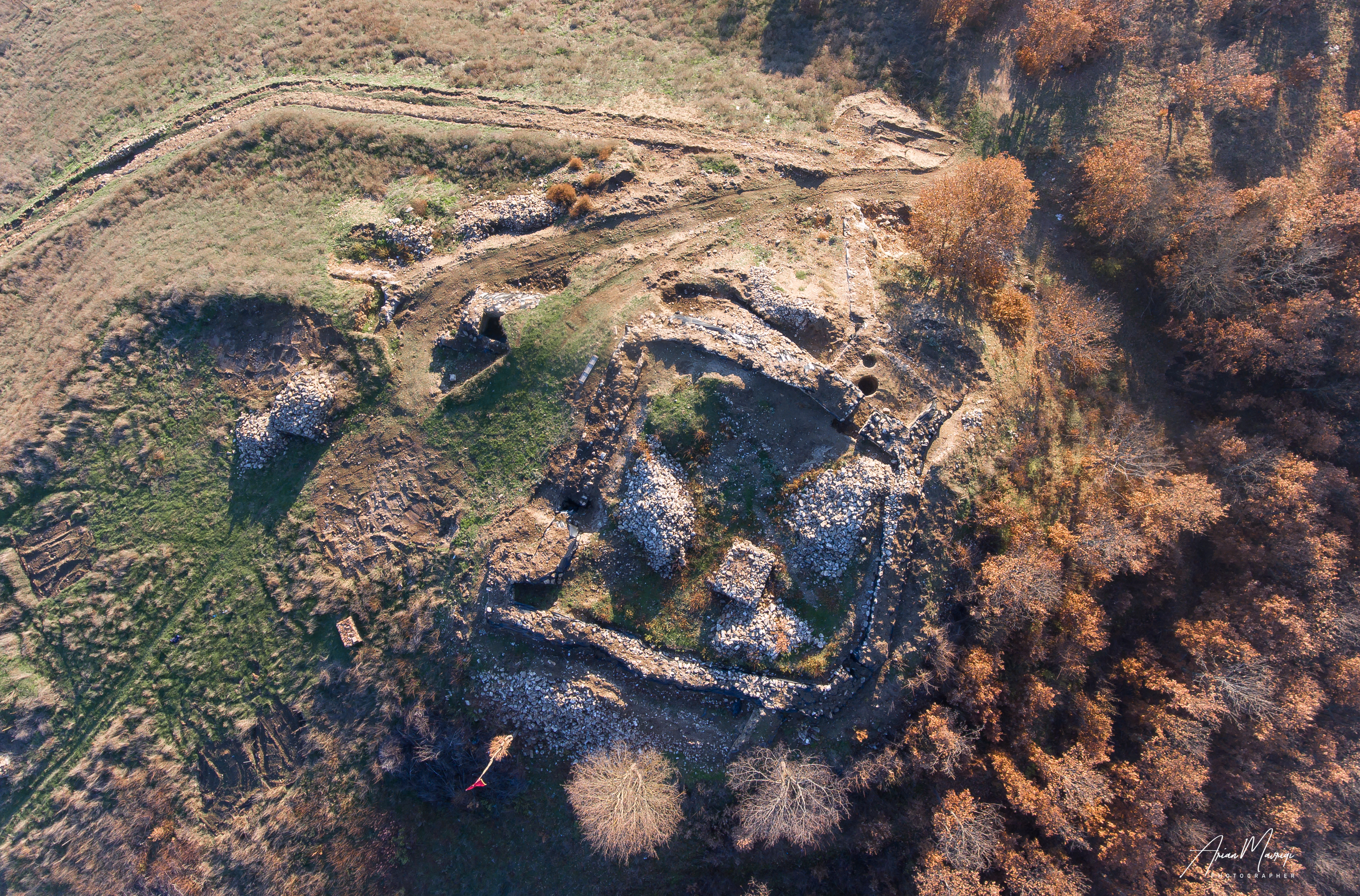
- Dardana Fortress - aerial view

- Location within Kosovo
- Interactive map of Dardana Fortress
- 42°35′36″N 21°33′38″E
- Periods: Late Bronze; Iron Age (8th-7th centuries BCE); Classical-Hellenistic antiquity (5th-4th centuries BCE); Late Antiquity (4th-6th centuries CE)
- Location: Kosovo

Site notes
- Elevation: 560 m (1,840 ft)
- Area: 3 ha (7.4 acres)
- Excavation dates: 2012-present day
- Archaeologists: Shafi Gashi, Klodian Velo
- Discovered: 1970s
- Management: Archaeological Institute of Kosovo

The Dardana Fortress (Albanian: Kalaja e Dardanës) is an archaeological site of the Bronze Age, Iron Age and late antiquity in eastern Kosovo. It is located on a hill to the northwest of Kamenica. It was a hilltop settlement and fortress of the Dardani in classical antiquity. It was rebuilt in the late Roman period as part of the fortification system in the Roman province of Dardania. The site was discovered in the 1970s, but excavations did not start in earnest until 2012. One of the very earliest finds at the site is a funerary stele found accidentally at the foot of the hill in 1992. Its interpretation has helped shed light on Illyrian burial customs, and excavations at the site have contributed to knowledge about the trade patterns between Dardania and the Mediterranean region. Similar sites have been discovered in recent years in the Kamenica region.

== History ==
=== Bronze age ===
The earliest finds in the site date to the late Neolithic. They consist of two stones axes, fragments from a flint knife and a pierced stone hammer. These materials are considered to have brought to the site from another location. The first finds which are considered to have been originally in the site date to the Bronze age and are mainly fragments of pottery.

=== Late antiquity ===
The phase of late antiquity represents the last phase of habitation and use of the site. Most excavated architectural structures including the walls, the towers and the dwellings, date to this era. The fortification system has two lines of ramparts. The ground plan of the walls follows an irregular pattern as it follows the natural formation of the hill. They were built in a core-and-veneer and their width varies between 140 cm (55 in) to 210 cm (83 in). Stones used to build the wall are of local sandstone origin and of medium size.

=== Modern ===
The site has been declared an archaeological monument of the cultural heritage of Kosovo under designation number 1198 since 2015.

== See also ==
- Archaeology of Kosovo
- List of fortifications in Kosovo

== Bibliography ==
- Alaj, Premtim (2019). Les habitats de l'Age du fer sur le territoire de l'actuel Kosovo (Thesis). Université de Lyon.
- Berisha, Milot (2012). "Archaeological Guide of Kosovo" (PDF). Ministry of Culture of Kosovo.
