= Battle of Marseille =

1944 liberation of Marseille by Free French Forces

- Part of Mediterranean and Middle East Theatre and the European Theatre of World War II
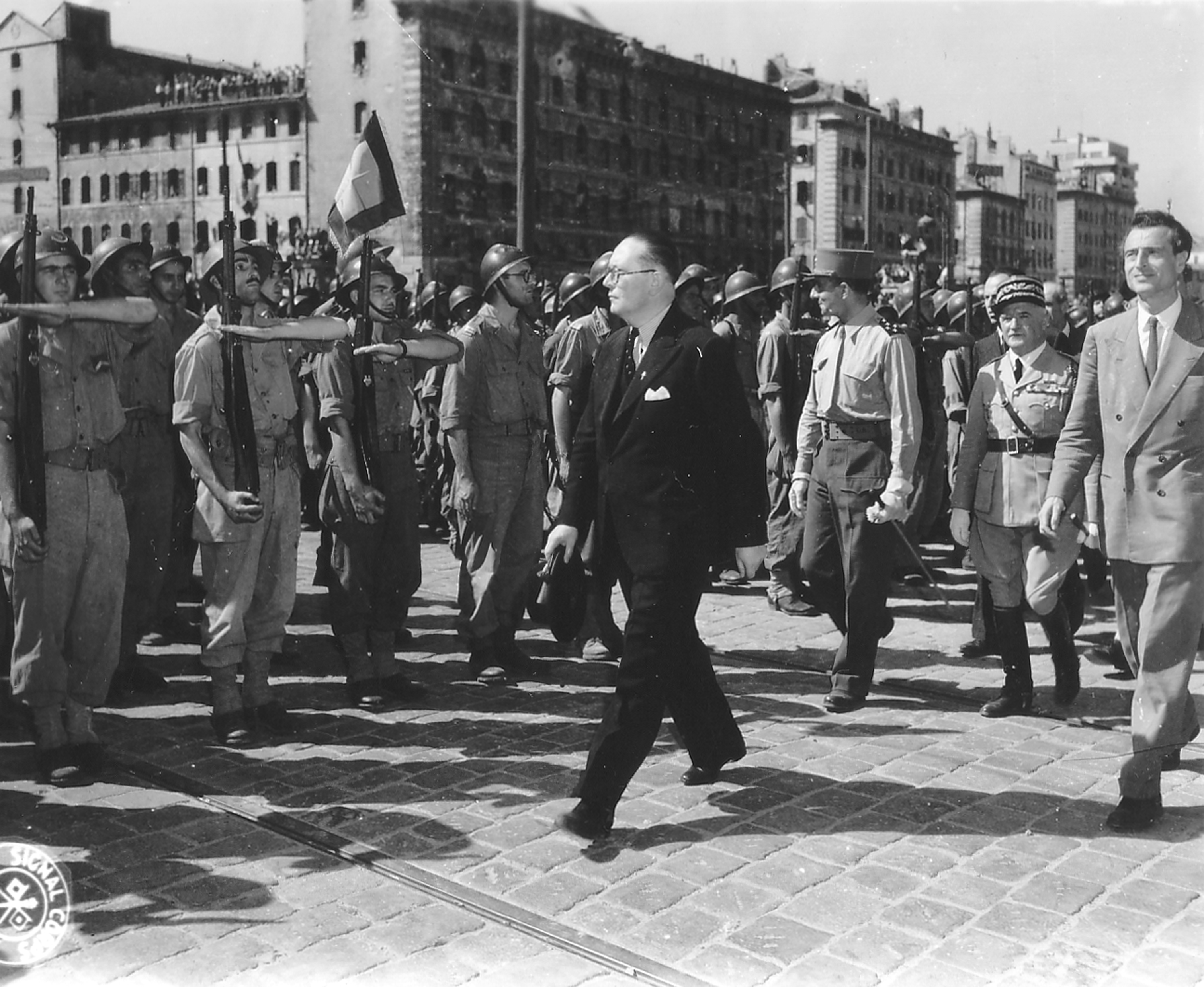
- (From left to right) André Diethelm, Jean de Lattre de Tassigny, Joseph de Goislard de Monsabert and Emmanuel d'Astier de La Vigerie reviewing the 7th Algerian Tirailleurs Regiment in liberated Marseille, 29 August 1944
Date	21–28 August 1944
Location	Marseille, southern France 43.33°N 5.38°E
Result	Allied victory

Belligerents
(Provisional Government of the French Republic) France	(Nazi Germany) Germany

Commanders and leaders
Joseph de Goislard de Monsabert; Veli Dedi	(Nazi Germany) Hans Schäfer

Units involved
II Corps	244th Division

Strength
French Army: 12,000	13,000

Casualties and losses
1,400	2,000 killed and wounded 11,000 captured

The Battle of Marseille was an urban battle of World War II that took place August 21–28, 1944, and led to the liberation of Marseille by Free French forces under the command of General Jean de Lattre de Tassigny. The groundwork was laid by the Allied invasion of southern France in Operation Dragoon on 15 August 1944 by the United States Seventh Army, with major support from the French First Army.

== Background ==
Along with Toulon, the main port for the French Navy (French: Marine nationale), the Port of Marseille was a vital objective. The port, its facilities, and the rail and road links up the Rhone valley, being essential to the liberation of southern France and the ultimate defeat of German forces. After the successful execution of Operation Overlord (the Normandy landings), attention shifted to the south. Most ports in the north were unusable, or too heavily fortified (e.g. Cherbourg, Brest, Lorient, Saint Nazaire), which made seizure and control of the French ports at Marseille and Toulon increasingly attractive. In addition, the French leaders pressed for an invasion in southern France. Finally, after many delays, on 14 July, Operation Dragoon was authorized by the Allied Combined Chiefs of Staff. The groundwork was laid by the Allied invasion of southern France in Operation Dragoon on 15 August by the United States Seventh Army under General Patch, with support from the French First Army who began landing on 16 August and would within days amount to two thirds of the Dragoon troops on the ground. Patch gave the order to General Jean de Lattre de Tassigny to take the cities of Toulon and Marseille, which were to be attacked simultaneously with de Larminat in charge of attacking Toulon.

== Defences ==
German defences centred on almost static infantry units guarding the coastal areas, with 11th Panzer Division providing a mobile reserve.

At Marseille the 244th Infantry Division (Wehrmacht) provided the main defence, comprising three Grenadier regiments, the 932nd, 933rd and 934th together with an artillery regiment.

Existing French Army defensive points, including large artillery batteries, provided a reasonable seaward defence. The landward side defence was augmented with mines and the digging of weapons pits, trenches and tank obstacles.

On 20 August the Germans scuttled the ships that were in the harbour: one tanker, one cable laying ship, three passenger ships, and 20 cargo ships.

== Resistance ==
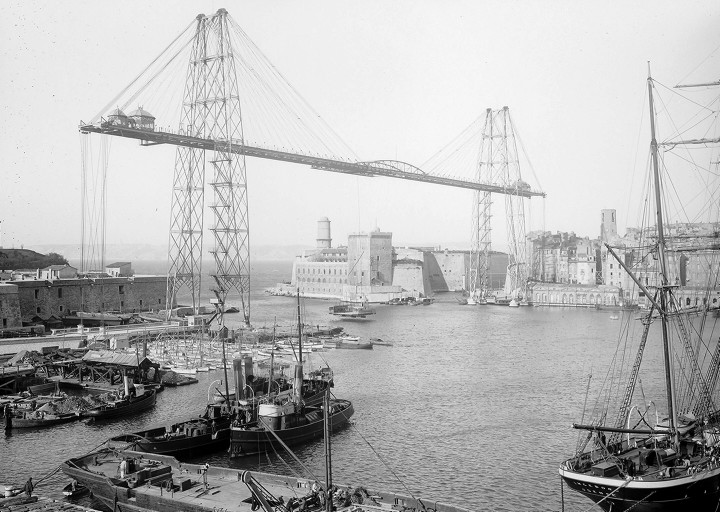
The Marseille transporter bridge

Marseille played host to two major resistance movements, the non communist coalition known as Mouvements Unis de la Résistance (MUR) with 800 men and the French Communist Party Francs-Tireurs et Partisans (FTP) with 2,000 men. Gaston Defferre was a leading figure in MUR as well as heading the Allied intelligence network. Both MUR and the Allies had operated a policy of non arming of communist groups. In February 1944 the creation of French Forces of the Interior (FFI) in theory merged the two groups, however they stayed opposed to each other until the FFI was absorbed into the regular French Army.

On 23 August, with French Army troops approaching the city suburbs, the Resistance took over the city's Prefecture. The German garrison could easily have destroyed this opposition, but seemed distracted by the regular French Army.

== 15–29 August ==
Softening up using heavy bombers to attack gun positions around Marseille began on 12 August, the city had few anti aircraft defences. The 23/24 attacks scored some direct hits on gun positions in the Marseille area and roaming fighter bombers took on targets of opportunity.

On 21 August the approaches to Marseille were cut, isolating the Marseille garrison. Units closed in on the suburbs. The Germans blew up the Marseille Transporter Bridge to try to block the port.

Ordered to clear the suburbs of Marseille, on 24 August 3rd Algerian Infantry Division occupied the centre of Marseille. General Joseph de Goislard de Monsabert decided that with the Resistance rising up and 1st Combat Command moving on the Old Port, he would call upon the Germans to surrender, but was refused.

Pockets of resistance were mopped up on 26 August. A German explosive-controlled boat attack on minesweepers sweeping channels to the port was broken up, and eight were sunk.

The main German resistance centred on the old fort of St Nicolas. French artillery opened up on the fort and after two days it was clear that resistance was futile and the Marseille garrison surrendered on 27 August. On 29 August marines from the cruisers USS Augusta and USS Philadelphia accepted the surrender of Germans on the fortified harbour islands.

French casualties were over 1,800 and they took 11,000 prisoners.

== Port ==
The ports of Toulon and Marseille were captured in 14 days, when the plan of attack had estimated D+40.

The Old Port of Marseille appeared to be in complete ruins. According to eye-witness accounts, in January 1943, the Germans, aided by the French police, dynamited much of the historic old town and demolished the gigantic aerial ferry or "transbordeur", an engineering tour de force that had become a major landmark of Marseille, comparable to the Eiffel Tower in Paris. However, the harbour was still functional. In August 1944 Hitler ordered his troops under the command of General Hans Schäfer to hold Marseille "to the last man and last cartridge" and destroy the harbour beyond repair if defeat was inevitable. But Schäfer refused to let the majority of his men become casualties and allowed only partial demolition. He and his 11,000 surviving troops surrendered on August 28.

The main Marseille-Fos Port facilities suffered damage from 2,000 mines that were used to destroy quays, bridges, moles, cranes and sheds, however with hard work, two weeks later, the first ship entered the port to begin unloading supplies.

The landing of supplies increased rapidly, with 57,000 tonnes (63,000 short tons) of rail freight moving from the port in September, plus 200,000 tonnes (220,000 short tons) by truck.

A fuel pipe line was built, it started at Martigues and utilising storage tanks in the La Mede refinery. The harbour was mined and it was 9 September when the first tanker docked. A tug assisting it dock hit a mine. Pipe laying started the same day. Six teams, each laying over three kilometres (two miles) of 100-millimetre (4 in) pipe a day. Interim storage and dispensing points were built. When completed it was capable of moving 450 tonnes (500 short tons) of petrol a day, which reduced the problems caused by a shortage of jerrycans and trucks. A second 150 mm (6 in) pipeline would be laid and it eventually reached the Sarrebourg, 850 km away. By Spring 1945, 4,500,000 litres (1,200,000 US gal) were being pumped every day, meeting the requirements of both the Seventh United States Army and the First Army (France).

By mid October, with the repairs to the railway lines, especially bridges, freight increased. The southern route would become a significant source of supplies to help the Allied advance into Germany, moving over 91,000 tonnes (100,000 short tons) a week and providing about one third of the total Allied requirement.

== Aftermath ==
The left wing French resistance took over the city administration and the American forces did not have an easy time of getting their requirements met, using the city as a rest and relaxation centre was not appreciated.

General Charles de Gaulle took a dim view of FTP and the part it played in the liberation. He ensured that these paramilitary units were absorbed into the regular army, so eliminating any threat against him. The French Army presence in southern France combined with the Leclerc's 2nd Armoured Liberation of Paris elevated De Gaulle to the leader of the Provisional Government of the French Republic in the eyes of the Allied Politicians.

The port of Marseille had been the prime route for the shipping of Red Cross parcels from Lisbon to the International Committee of the Red Cross in Geneva, for onward transport to PoW camps. Operation Dragoon put a stop to that, although a few parcels did start arriving again through Toulon in November.

== Bibliography ==
- Yeide, Harry (2007). First to the Rhine: The 6th Army Group In World War II. Zenith Press. ISBN 978-0-7603-3146-0.
- Zaloga, Steven J. (2009). Operation Dragoon 1944: France's other D-Day. Osprey Publishing Ltd. ISBN 978-1-84603-367-4.
- Gaujac, Paul (1985). L'Armée de la victoire [The Army of Victory]. Les Grandes batailles de France (in French). Vol. 3 De la Provence à l'Alsace. Paris: Charles-Lavauzelle. pp. 124–137. ISBN 978-2-702-50126-9. OCLC 461876740..
- Jean de Lattre de Tassigny (1949). Histoire de la première armée française [History of the First French Army] (in French). Plon. ISBN 978-2258007055.
- François de Linares (2005). Par les portes du Nord : la libération de Toulon et Marseille en 1944 [By the Northern Ports: the Liberation of Toulon and Marseille in 1944] (in French). Paris: Nouvelles éditions latines. ISBN 978-2-723-32056-6. OCLC 62176140.
