= Water in Pristina =

Pristina, the capital city of Kosovo, is one of the municipalities with the most severe water shortages in the country. Citizens of Pristina have to cope with daily water curbs due to the lack of rainfall and snowfall which has left the city's water supplies in a dreadful condition. The current water resources do not fulfill the needs of the overgrowing population of Pristina. The water supply comes from the two main reservoirs of Batllava and Badovci. However, there are many problems with the water supply that comes from these two reservoirs which supply 92% of the population in Pristina. As such, the authorities have increased their efforts to remedy the situation and to make sure that such crises do not hit the city again.

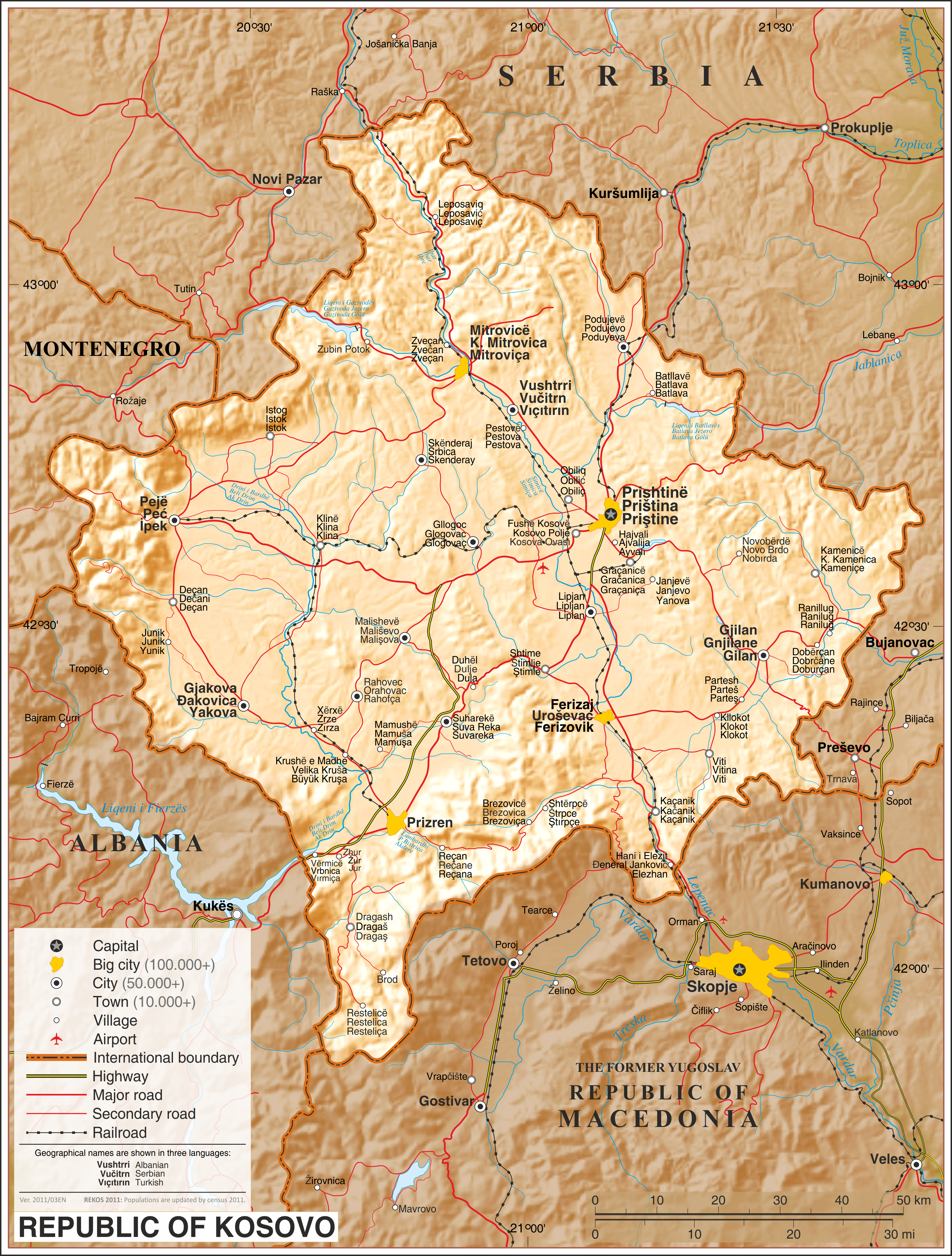
Topographic map of Kosovo - Bodies of water

== Natural water resources ==
=== Rivers ===
There is no river flowing within the city of Pristina. Some time ago the rivers of Veluša and Prištevka used to flow through Pristina. However, none of these rivers are visible anymore since they were covered. This was done because people were throwing garbage in the river and the smell resulting from this garbage was so bad which prompted the local authorities to cover both rivers. Currently, Pristina acquires its water from rivers which are located in nearby areas but not in Pristina itself.

=== Underground water ===
The current mayor of Pristina, Shpend Ahmeti, is actively searching for alternative water resources. He has stated that there are many sources of underground water which can be exploited in order to improve the situation of the water supply for Pristina. The main underground water resources in Pristina are the wells which have been identified in “Pajtimi” valley, the “Llukar” village, and “Germia” park

The wells in Pajtimi Valley are out of functioning because the valley was used as a construction material waste deposit, which has covered up the wells. Prior to being used for this purpose, the wells used to supply some neighborhoods with water. Hydrogeologists have confirmed that the valley is rich in underground water resources. According to hydro geologists the valley could be a subject of study for recognizing and utilizing new water resources.

Two wells have been identified in the Llukar village; however, they have been out of functioning since 1983. Underground water resources exist in the Germia park as well. Currently, the water that comes from the springs flows to Germia swimming pool.

== Water supply and distribution ==
=== Overview and history of the water supply ===
Pristina started to be supplied with water, which was mainly coming from Germia and Kolevica resources (wells), at a very early period of time.

In 1961, the Regional Water Company began to supply Pristina with water coming from the Badovc Lake, which supplied water for a population of 38.593 citizens. In 1979, Pristina began to grow in terms of population and construction. Therefore, the need for more water grew. As a result, the Regional Water Company started to provide larger quantities of water to respond to the growing water demand. The water was mainly coming from the reservoir of Batllava and underground resources of Kosovo Polje and Obilić.

Since the end of the Kosovo War (1998–99), the “Regional Water Company Batllava” underwent some changes. However, in 2007, it became a joint stock company called the “Regional Water Company Pristina”. Currently the “Regional Water Company Pristina” provides water supplies and other services for 40% of the population of Kosovo, making it the largest water company in Kosova. Presently, it supplies Pristina, Gračanica, Kosovo Polje, Obiliq, Lipjan, Shtime, Drenas, and Podujevë municipalities with water.

=== Water quality ===
National Institute of Public Health (NIPH), which is within the Ministry of Health, is the responsible organ for monitoring the quality of water. In general, Kosovo is considered to have good tap water quality which also includes Pristina as one of its most developed cities. Moreover, the water coming from kitchen taps is drinkable.

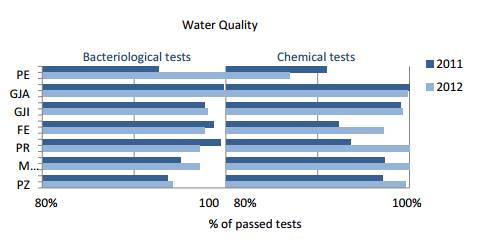
Water quality in the main municipalities of Kosovo - 'PR' refers to Pristina

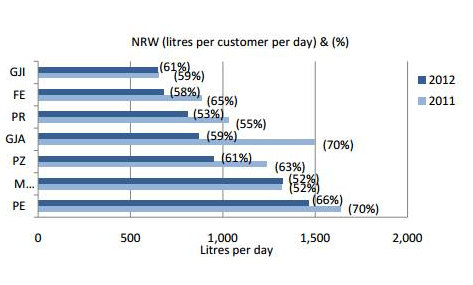
Liters per customer per day in % - 'PR' refers to Pristina

Regional Water Company	Number of municipalities covered with services	Number of customers	Number of population covered	Reference
Pristina	1500	500,443	700,432	

=== Water usage ===
- Industrial purposes
- Personal purposes
- Domestic purposes
- Irrigation purposes
- Car washing
- Gardening
- Fishing

There is a poor quality of data on water resources in Kosovo, including Pristina. A high portion of the data and information is unreliable, including the data and information on the growth of population, demand for water, usage of water, quality of water, pollution of water and climate change.

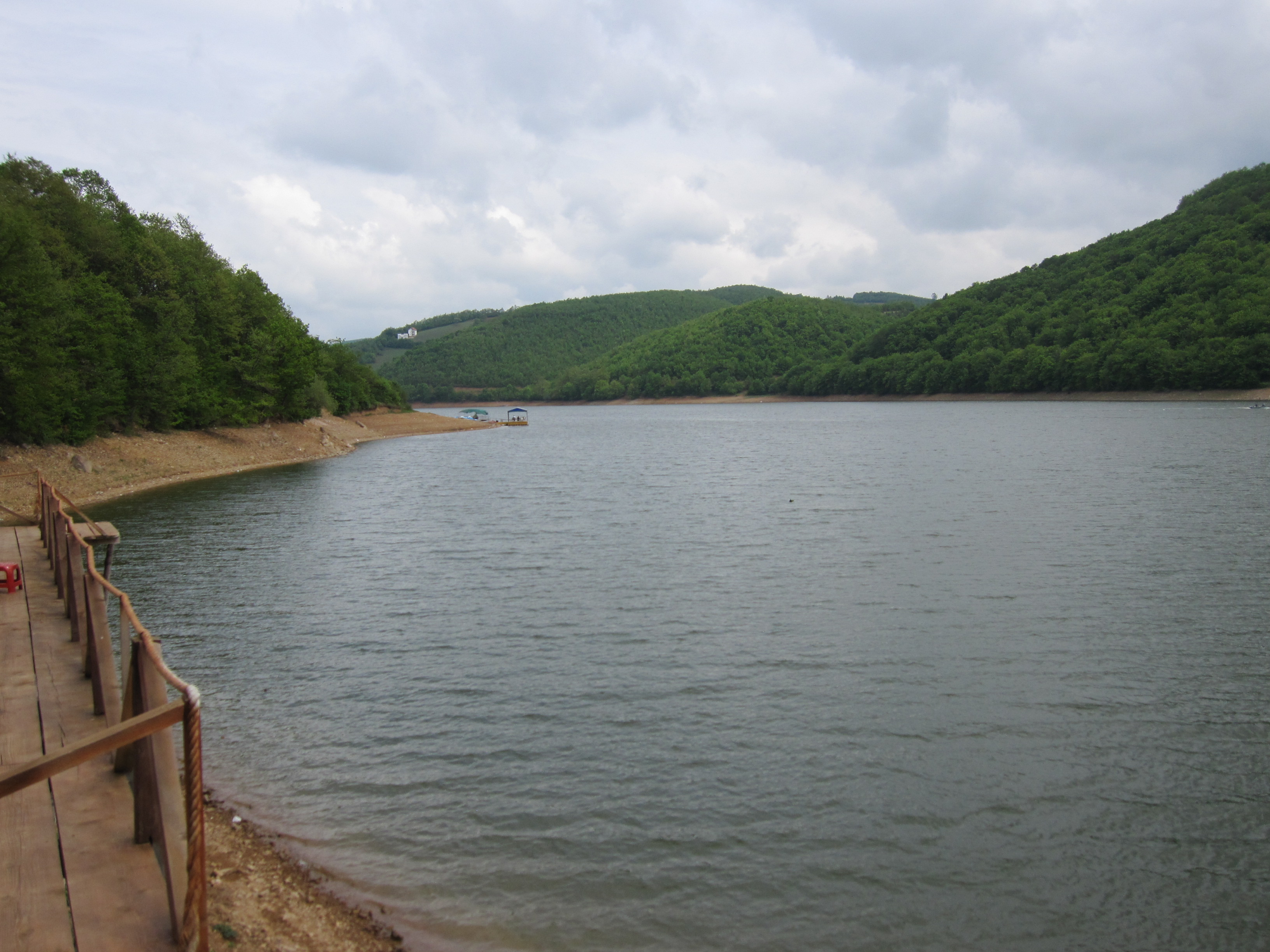
The artificial Lake Batllava

=== Batllava reservoir ===
Coordinates: 42.820°N 21.311°E

Lake Batllava is an artificial lake located in the region which entails the municipalities of Podujevë, Pristina, Gjilan, and Mitrovica. It is filled with water from Batllava river which is a sub-branch of the Llapi River. Its basin encompasses an area of 225 km² while the total surface area of the lake stands at 2.25 km².

The average flow in the lake of Batllava is 1.06 m³ per second. The total storage volume of Batllava reservoir is estimated to be 30 million m³ of which 25.1 million m³ is exploitable. It has five main sub-basins, which are further divided into smaller ones. Currently, 64% of the population of Pristina is supplied with drinking water from Batllava reservoir. The basin of Lake Batllava has just recently been cleaned up in order to have clean water when the basin is refilled again. This action took place on 22 February 2014

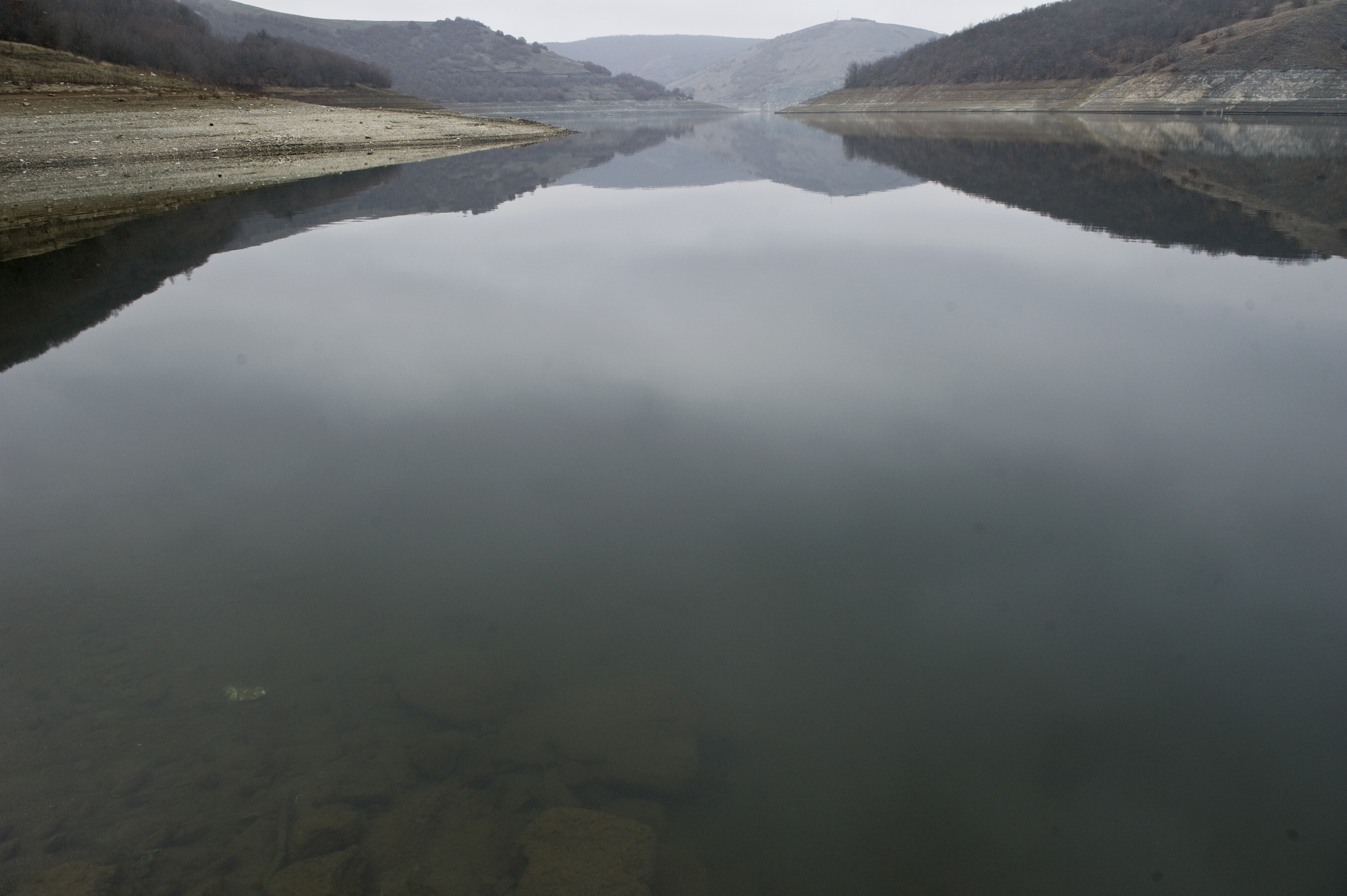
The decreased level of water in Badovc Lake

=== Badovc reservoir ===
Coordinates: 42.623°N 21.241°E

Badovc Lake is an artificial lake located in the region which entails the municipalities of Pristina, Lipjan, and Novo Brdo. It is filled with water from the Gračanica river. Its basin encompasses an area of 104 km² while the total surface area of the lake stands at 0.89 km². The average flow in the lake Badovc is 1.08 m³ per second. The total storage volume of Badovc reservoir is 26.4 million m³ of which 20 million m³ is exploitable. Currently, 28% of the population of Pristina is supplied with drinking water from Badovc reservoir. Badovc Lake was cleaned as well in light of the plans to transfer water from other lakes.

== Problems with the water supply ==
=== Climate ===
Kosovo has a continental climate, which is characterized by warm summers and relatively cold and snowy winters. Since Pristina is located in the region of “Rrafshi i Kosovës”, the climate is very dry. The climate in Pristina is characterized by very hot summers with a temperature ranging from 20 °C to 37 °C and cold winters with a temperature ranging from -10 °C to - 26 °C. In the winter of 2012, there were blizzards and snow throughout Kosovo, including Pristina. In the winter of 2013, there were heavy rains and floods.

Currently, in the winter of 2014, Pristina is facing a drought. It is the driest winter in the past 20 years. There is a severe lack of both rain and snow. This draught has caused the water levels to decrease in both the Batllava and Badovc basins. If the weather continues the same pattern, the reservoirs may be emptied soon. As a result, the people of Pristina and nearby areas risk being left with no water supply.

=== Leakages in the system ===
Leakages or water technical losses are one of the main concerns for the water supply network in Pristina. The percentage of water not being distributed to the end consumer, but instead being lost through the distribution network is high, mainly due to the old infrastructure and the lack of investments. However, the exact amount of water which is leaked throughout the distribution system cannot be measured; instead, it can be approximated through non-revenue water. The downside of using this measurement method to approximate the technical losses of water stands in the fact that the non-revenue water, apart from leakages that happen throughout the system, also takes into account the illegal connections on the system which represent commercial losses. The amount of non-revenue water in Pristina has slightly decreased from 2011 to 2012. Nonetheless, it still remains high. This difference between the water produced and the amount of water billed in Pristina on 2011 was slightly more than 25 million m³, whereas on 2012 it decreased to around 24 million m³.

=== Illegal connections to the water system ===
In 2012, The Council for Defense of Human Rights and Freedoms considered water shortages on the behalf of the Regional Water Supply Pristina as an abuse towards human rights. The company's response for not supplying Pristina neighborhoods with water was the commercial losses (illegal connections) and redundant water wasted for home irrigation, car washes, and others in substantial quantities. Accordingly, it is unfeasible and abusers should be reprimanded.

== Planning and Management ==
=== Water plant in Shkabaj ===
The Regional Water Company Pristina with the support of Germany’s KfW, the European Union, and other donors initiated the project "Water Plant in the Village Shkabaj". The project encompasses three phases. Phase one aimed to build a new reservoir and upgrade pipe infrastructure. It was completed in May 2012 with a cost of €8 million. Phase two aims to continue upgrading pipe infrastructure to inhibit water loss in five Pristina neighborhoods. It will cost approximately €17 million. Phase three aims to build a new waste-water treatment plant that will have 700 liters per second capacity, with a further possible addition of 500 liters per second in order for the secure and reliable provision of water supply for 24 hours. It will serve three municipalities: Pristina, Fushë Kosovë and Kastrioti. A study that costs approximately €150,000 was initially conducted in order to test the viability of this phase.

=== Other projects ===
Due to the water crisis that has hit Pristina, both municipal and central authorities are making efforts to improve the situation. Currently, efforts are being made in transferring water from Ujman Lake to Badovc Lake. The transferring of the water is being done through the channel of Ibar-Lepenac which is being cleaned and tested.

There are active efforts being done in finding additional water resources, mainly from the underground resources in Pristina. Recently, three new wells were dug successfully in the Germia Park which are expected to improve the situation. The local authorities have also recognized nine wells in the Pajtimi Valley which according to the local authorities are going to be functionalized and utilized soon. These wells have a capacity of sixty liters per second. The municipality of Pristina has planned to clean up these wells in conjunction with the regional water company.

The wells in village Llukar are being functionalized and are expected to increase the water level in Lake Batllava. These two wells can produce up to fifty litres per second each. In addition, in order to combat this situation of severe water shortages, the regional municipalities have made efforts in improving the inspection of rational water usage. These efforts are expected to improve the situation in the short term.
