= Nuhi Berisha =

Albanian revolutionary

- Born: October 3, 1961; Svirca, Kamenica, Kosovo
- Died: January 11, 1984 (aged 22); Vranjevc, Kosovo
- Known for: People's Movement of Kosovo

Nuhi Berisha (October 3, 1961 – January 19, 1984) was a Kosovo Albanian revolutionary and founder of the People's Movement of Kosovo.

== Early life ==
He was born in Kamenica, the son of Rexhep (Sylë) Berisha and Fahrije, in a traditional family. He finished primary and eight-year school in his hometown, in Hogosht, while the family moved to Gjilan, when he enrolled in the Zenel Hajdini". He attended primary school in his hometown, secondary school in Gjilan, and the Faculty of Law and Physical Culture in Pristina. With the initiative of Rexhep Mala and other collaborators, he participated in the formation of the Student Committee within the Revolutionary Group, which served the Albanian Liberation Movement as the core of the Student Movement of 1981.

== Revolution ==
In 1973 they began Berisha and his friend Rexhep Mala publishing the Voice of Kosovo newspaper. In 1981, they formed a revolutionary group called Movement for an Albanian republic in Yugoslavia to Serve the Albanian Liberation Movement. Berisha attempted to lay the foundations for a liberation movement that would operate continuously.

== Death ==
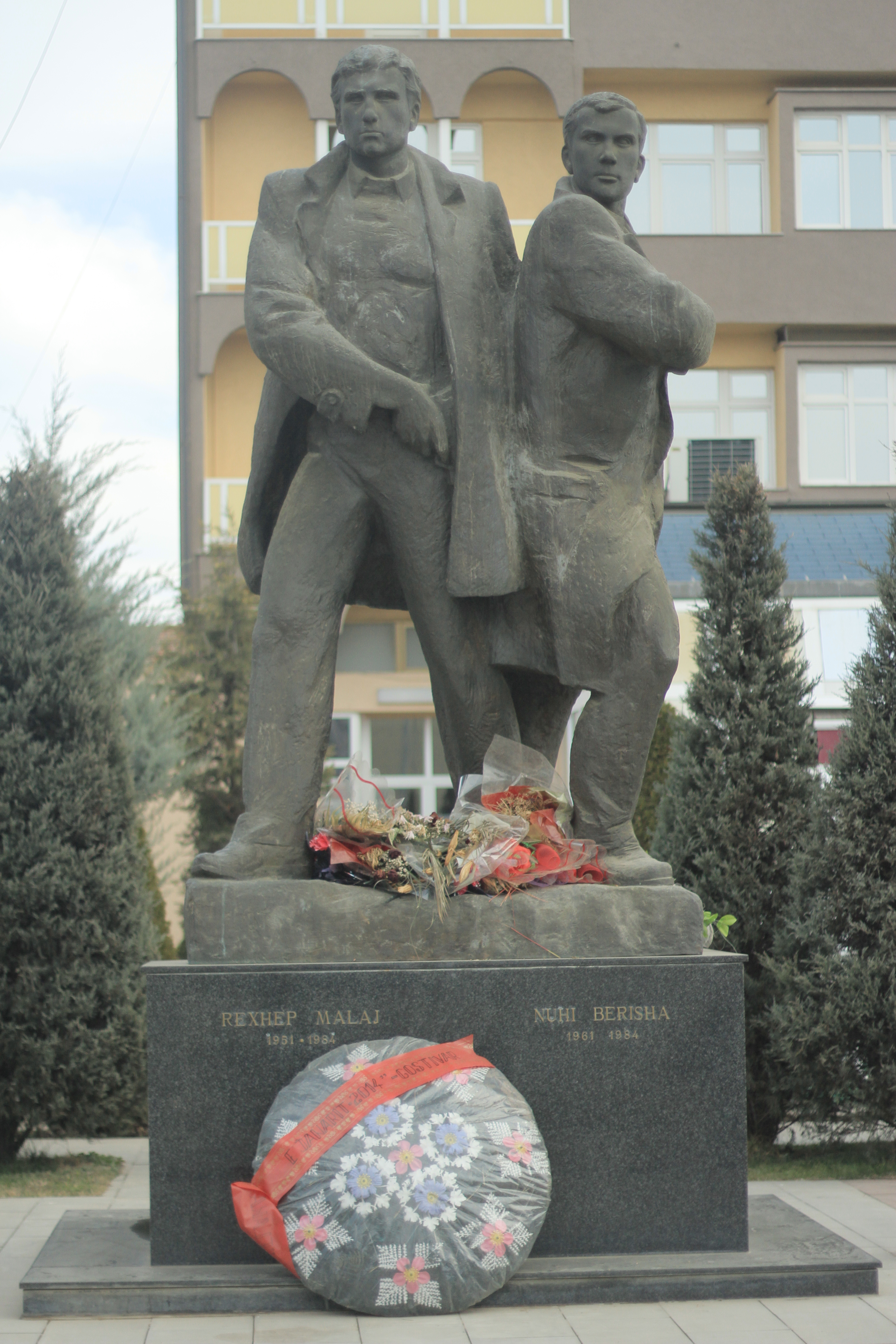
Statue of Nuhi Berisha and Rexhep Mala

In January 1984 Berisha and Mala were killed in Vranjevc by the Serbian police. Berisha and Mala are valued as two of the central figures of the resistance and the efforts of the Albanian people of Kosovo for freedom and independence.

After they were killed, the group managed to wound a man from the secret police and plant a few small bombs.

Within the LPRK we were the radicals, the military wing of that party.' The bombs did not kill anyone, according to Shala: 'they were just to say we existed'.
