= Gjimnazi Zenel Hajdini =

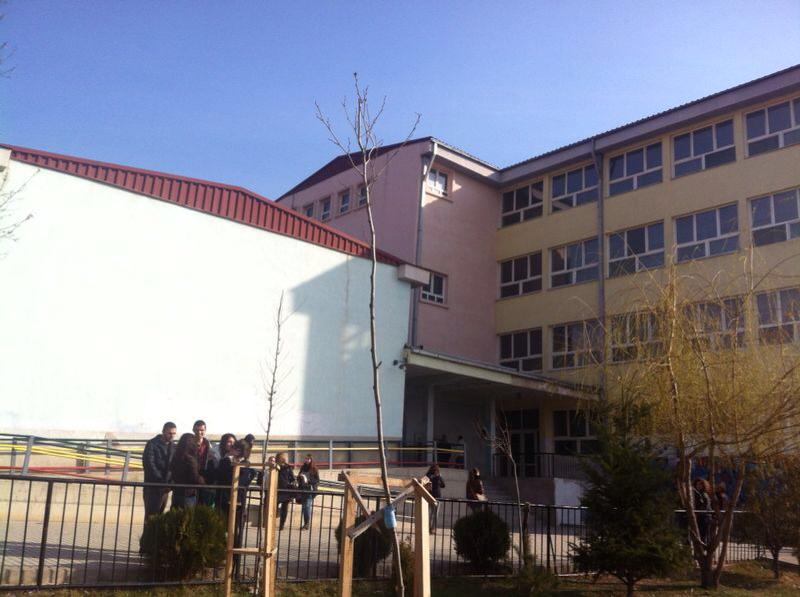

Location
- Gjilan; Kosovo
- Coordinates: 42.468055°N 21.465533°E

Information
- Type: High School
- Established: 1945
- Director: Jeton Rexhepi
- Grades: 10-12
- Gender: Middle School, Gymnasium
- Age: 15 and to 19
- Language: Albanian
- Campus size: 1200km2
- Campus type: Campus
- Colors: Blue and White
- Newspaper: Gjimnazisti
- Yearbook: Libri i Gjenerates

Gjimnazi Zenel Hajdini is a high school in Gjilan, Kosovo.

== History ==
The original building was built as an Ottoman military hospital in 1896. Until 1945 it operated as a civic school. In 1964 it took the name of People's Hero Zenel Hajdini.

In the 1960s, Turkish language started to be taught along with the Albanian language and Serbian languages. A new building hosted the school in 1973.

Today the school hosts around 2,300 students.

== Organization ==
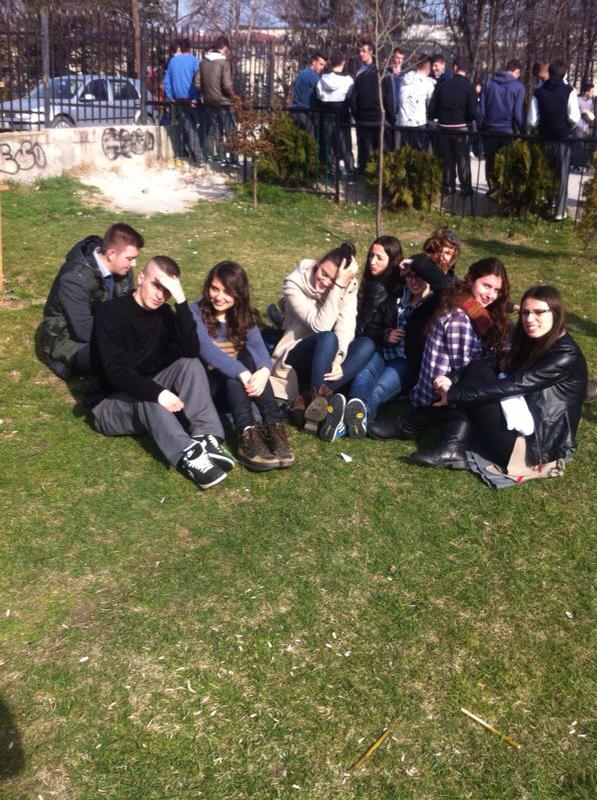
Students in their free lessons

The "Zenel Hajdini" Gymnasium works under the frameworks and curriculum of the MEST of the Republic of Kosovo. Teaching is offered in Albanian and Turkish, with Albanian being the main teaching language.
