= Demir Krasniqi =

Musician and journalist from Kosovo

Demir Krasniqi (born 10 June 1950) is from the village of Tugjec near Kamenica, Kosovo. He went to school locally but studied music in secondary school and university in Pristina. His main mentor from early on in his schooling was the teacher Rexhep Bunjaku. In sixth grade, he took first place at a regional music competition known as “Mikrofoni është i Juaji” ("The Microphone Is Yours").

He worked as a music teacher in Kosovo schools, as he still does today.

He has written, composed, and recorded 1,500 original songs and dances on vinyl, cassettes, video, CD, and DVD. He collects folk songs as well, including over 4,000 in his repertoire, many of them collected by Lorenc Antoni in volumes IV-VII of his collection Bleni muzikor shqiptar.

Krasniqi is also a journalist, and currently lives and works in Gjilan.

== Publications ==
1. Mallëngjima e ushtima ("Wishes and Rumors"), Pristina, 1993
2. Qamili i vogël-zë që nuk shuhet ("The Little Family Voice That Never Goes Away," monograph), Pristina, 1995
3. Gjakon Kosova ("Kosovo Lives"), Gjilan, 1998
4. Bejtë Pireva ("Bejtë Ali Pireva"), Gjilan, 2002
5. Zeqir Maroca ("Zeqir Marocës"), Gjilan, 2002
6. Këngë krismash lirie I ("Songs Crying Freedom"), Gjilan, 2003
7. Këngë krismash lirie II, Pristina, 2003
8. Familja Kurti nga Tygjeci ("The Kurti Family of Tugjec," monograph), Pristina, 2004
9. Shtojzovallet e Gollakut ("The Shtojzovalle of Gollak), Kosovo ETMM, Pristina, 2005
10. Kushtrim lirie ("To Freedom"), Kurora Elementary School, Gjilan, 2005
11. Liman Shahiqi-trimi i Gollakut ("Liman Shahiqi: Hero of Gollak"), Pristina, 2005
12. Kroi i këngës ("The Source of Songs"), Gjilan, 2006
13. Qamili i Vogël: Këngë përjetësie ("Qamili i Vogël: Eternal Songs," collected, edited, and interpreted by Demir Krasniqi), Gjilan, November 2006
14. Krenaria e Gollakut ("Pride of Gollak, a 40-year career retrospective), Gjilan, 2008
15. Diell Lirie ("Freedom Sun"), Gjilan, 2008
