= Marseille Transporter Bridge =

Destroyed french bridge

Coordinates: 43°17′39″N 5°21′49″E

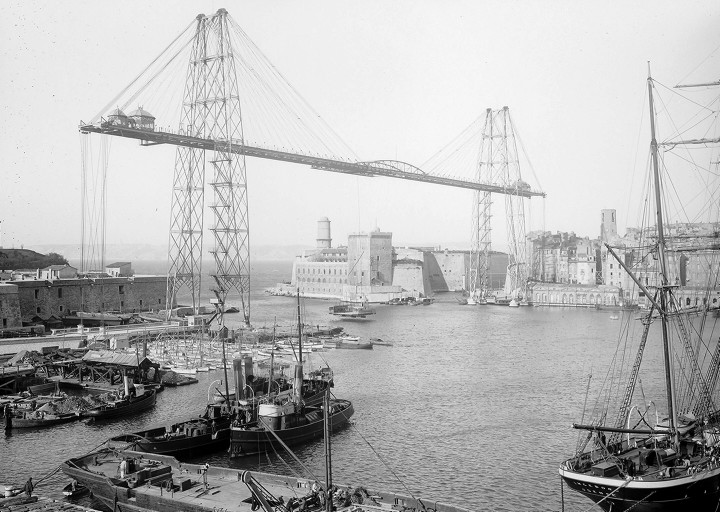
The Marseille transporter bridge

The Marseille transporter bridge, inaugurated in 1905 and destroyed in 1944, was a crossing of the Old Port of Marseille, designed by engineer Ferdinand Arnodin.

== History ==
The transporter bridge of Marseille was built in nineteen months to connect the quays of the Rive Neuve. It was inaugurated on 15 December 1905. In the 1930s, it served only as a decoration, due to the lack of means to maintain it.

On 22 August 1944, the German military blew up the bridge to block the port during the Liberation of Marseille, but only the north tower fell into the water. The rest collapsed on 1 September 1945, following the firing of 400 kg of explosives.

== See also ==
- Battle of Marseilles
- Operation Dragoon
