= Fort Saint-Nicolas (Marseille) =

Military fort in Marseille, France

Coordinates: 43.2911°N 5.3625°E

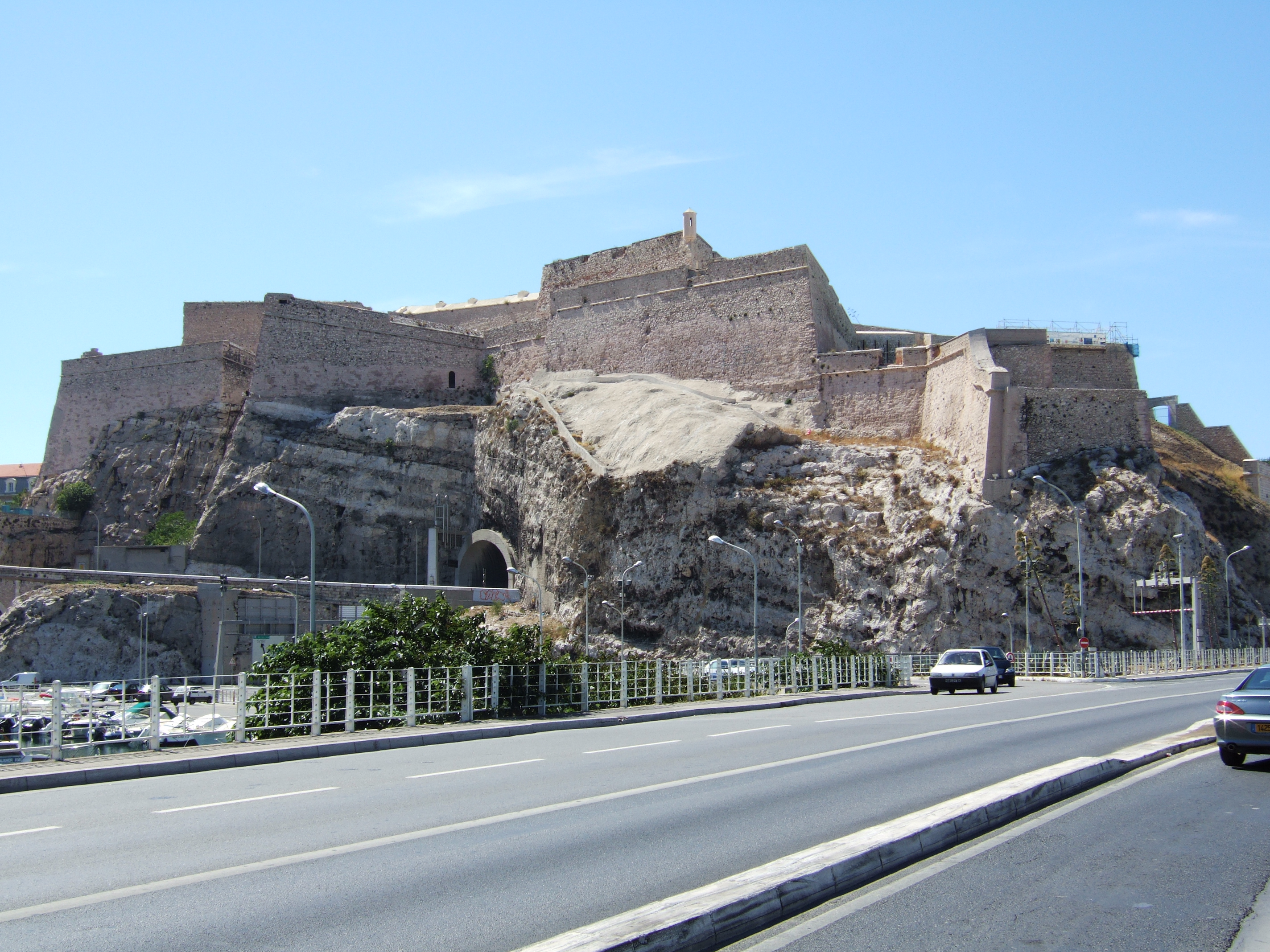

Fort Saint-Nicolas is a former military fort in Marseille. It's the sister fort to Fort Saint-Jean which was constructed at the same time.

After an uprising in 1630–31 and the Fronde in 1648–1652, the young King Louis XIV had two large forts, fort St. Jean and Fort St. Nicholas, built at the harbour entrance to control the city's unruly population. It was constructed at the same time as Fort Saint-Jean on the opposite side of the harbour. Commenting on their construction, Louis XIV said, "We noticed that the inhabitants of Marseille were extremely fond of nice fortresses. We wanted to have our own at the entrance to this great port." In fact, the two new forts had cannons pointed inwards towards the town, not outwards towards the sea.

It was besieged On 30 April 1790, and many of the soldiers inside were massacred.

During the Battle of Marseille, it was the main center of German resistance. French artillery opened up on the fort and after two days it was clear that resistance was futile and the Marseille garrison surrendered on 27 August. On 29 August marines from the cruisers USS Augusta and USS Philadelphia accepted the surrender of Germans on the fortified harbour islands.
