= Batllava Lake =

Lake in Kosovo

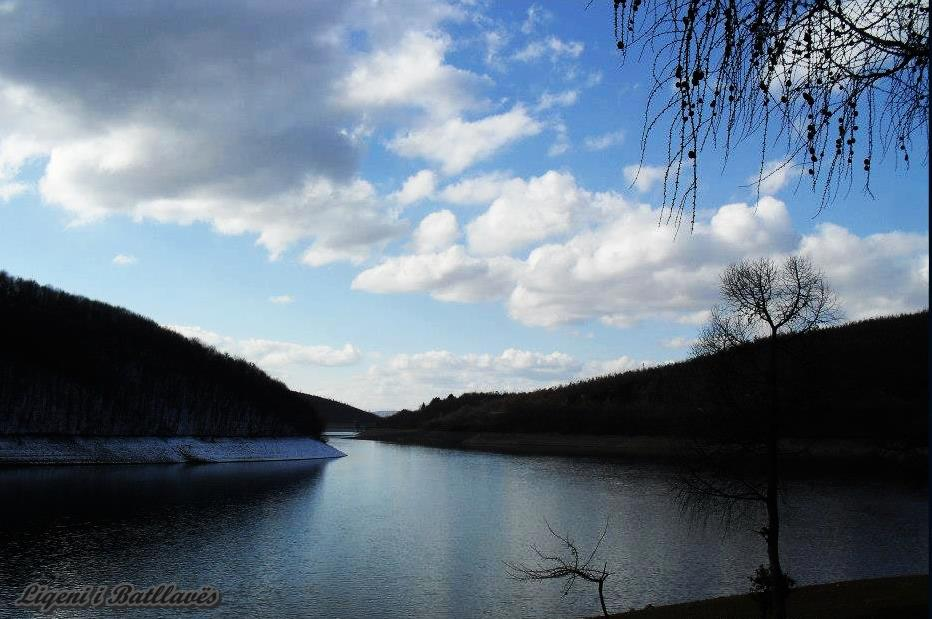
- View of the lake

- Location within Kosovo Location within Europe
- Interactive map of Batllava Lake
- Location: Podujevë, Kosovo
- Coordinates: 42°49′16″N 21°18′28″E
- Primary inflows: Batllava River
- Basin countries: Kosovo
- Max. length: 6 km (3.7 mi)
- Max. width: 700 m (2,300 ft)
- Surface area: 3.27 km^{2} (1.26 sq mi)
- Average depth: 35 m (115 ft)
- Surface elevation: 640 m (2,100 ft)
- Islands: 0

The Batllava Lake (Albanian: Liqeni i Batllavës; Serbian: Batlavsko jezero) is a lake in northeastern Kosovo. It is one of the largest bodies of water in Kosovo and it has an area of 3.29 km^{2} (1.27 sq mi). The bathing lake is a main tourist destination in summer.

== History ==
Construction of the Batllava Lake dam began in 1961 and was completed by 1965. Initially, the dam was constructed to provide water for the coal-fired power plants in Obiliq. However, the power plants now receive their water supply from Ujman Lake, which was developed later.

The lake now supplies water to the largest water supply company, the regional water supply company "Prishtina", and the cities and villages of the municipalities of Podujevë, Pristina, and Obiliq.

== Geography ==
Batllava Lake is located in the region of Llapi in northeastern Kosovo, within the municipality of Podujevë. The lake is approximately 13 km (8.1 mi) away from Podujevë and about 30 km (19 mi) from Pristina.

The Batllava Lake is fed by the river with the same name, Batllava River. The lake extends west to east, with its dam located on the western end. The lake is about 6 km (3.7 mi) long and it has a width up to 700 m (2,300 ft). The depth of the lake fluctuates by the seasons but it can have a depth up to 48 m (157 ft). As an artificial lake, Batllava Lake has a dam with a height of 40.5 m (133 ft).

== Tourism ==
As one of the main tourist destinations in Kosovo, Batllava Lake is surrounded by mountains and high forests rich in various plants. The natural landscape is amazing all year round, especially in summer. Apart from its main function, the drinking water supply for some cities, the lake is also a suitable place for other sports activities; swimming, fishing and boating. Bathing takes place in the eastern end of the lake.

== Fishing ==
Because the lake is rich in fish, especially carp and northern pike, fishing is quite developed and attractive to many regular visitors. Fishing competitions are also organized every year. On the shores of the lake there are several restaurants with fish menu and traditional food. Around the lake, in certain places, many mountain houses and holiday lodges have been built for tourists. The landscape of the lake and the forests around it attract many visitors at any time of the year.

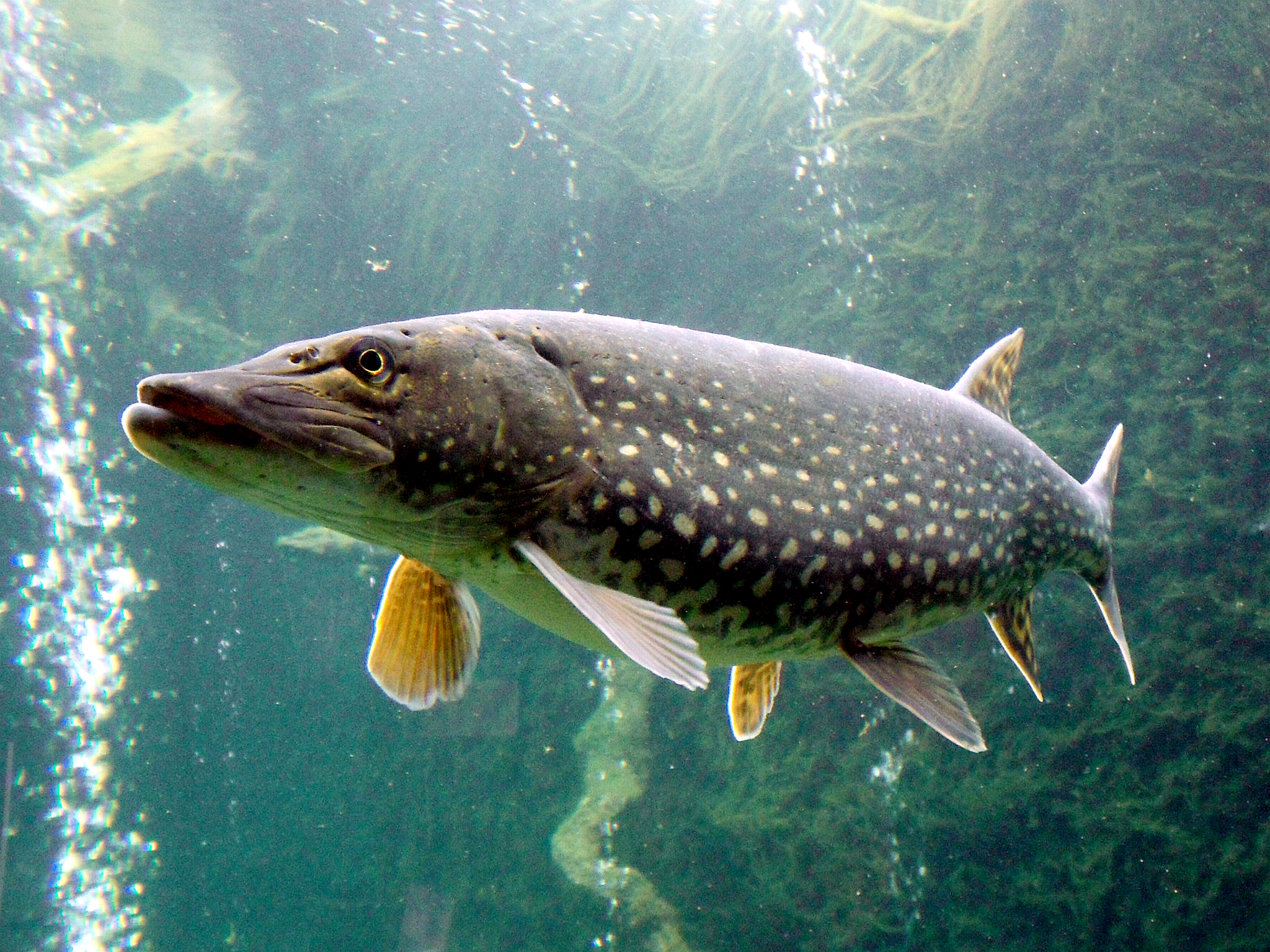
The Northern pike fish is one of the fish that are found in Batllava Lake.

== Water sports ==
Swimming is also an activity during the summer months. Swimming competitions are held in the lake from time to time. Organized by the Kosovo Swimming Federation, the International Swimming Marathon is held every year in Batllava Lake.

The "Kosova 2021" marathon was held, when 27 swimmers from Kosovo, Albania and North Macedonia competed on a 4.2 km (2.6 mi) path.

On the surface of the lake, apart from swimming, other water sports and activities can be practiced, such as boating, diving, kayaking, water skiing, etc.

== Gallery ==
Lake Batllava
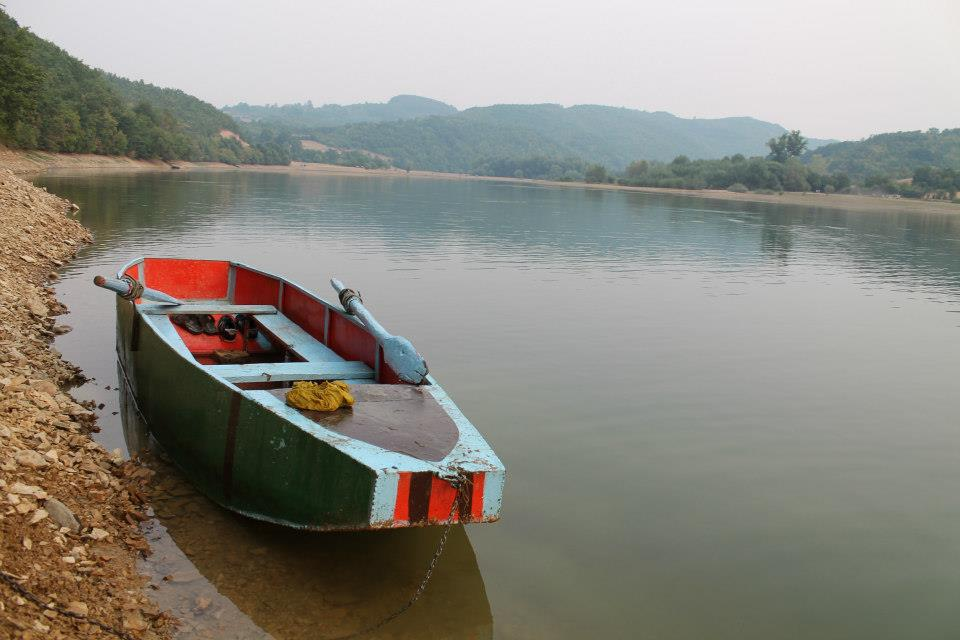
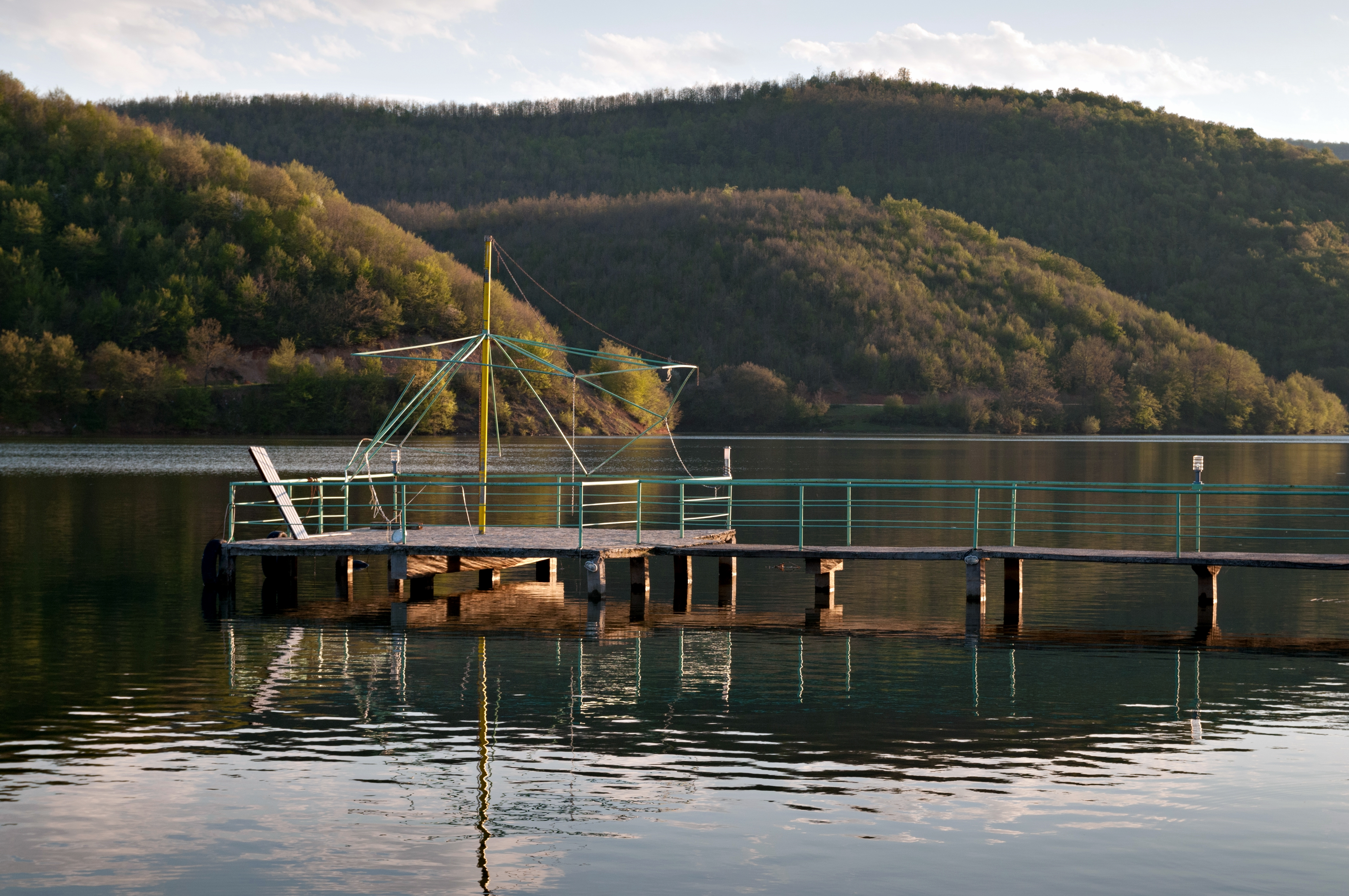
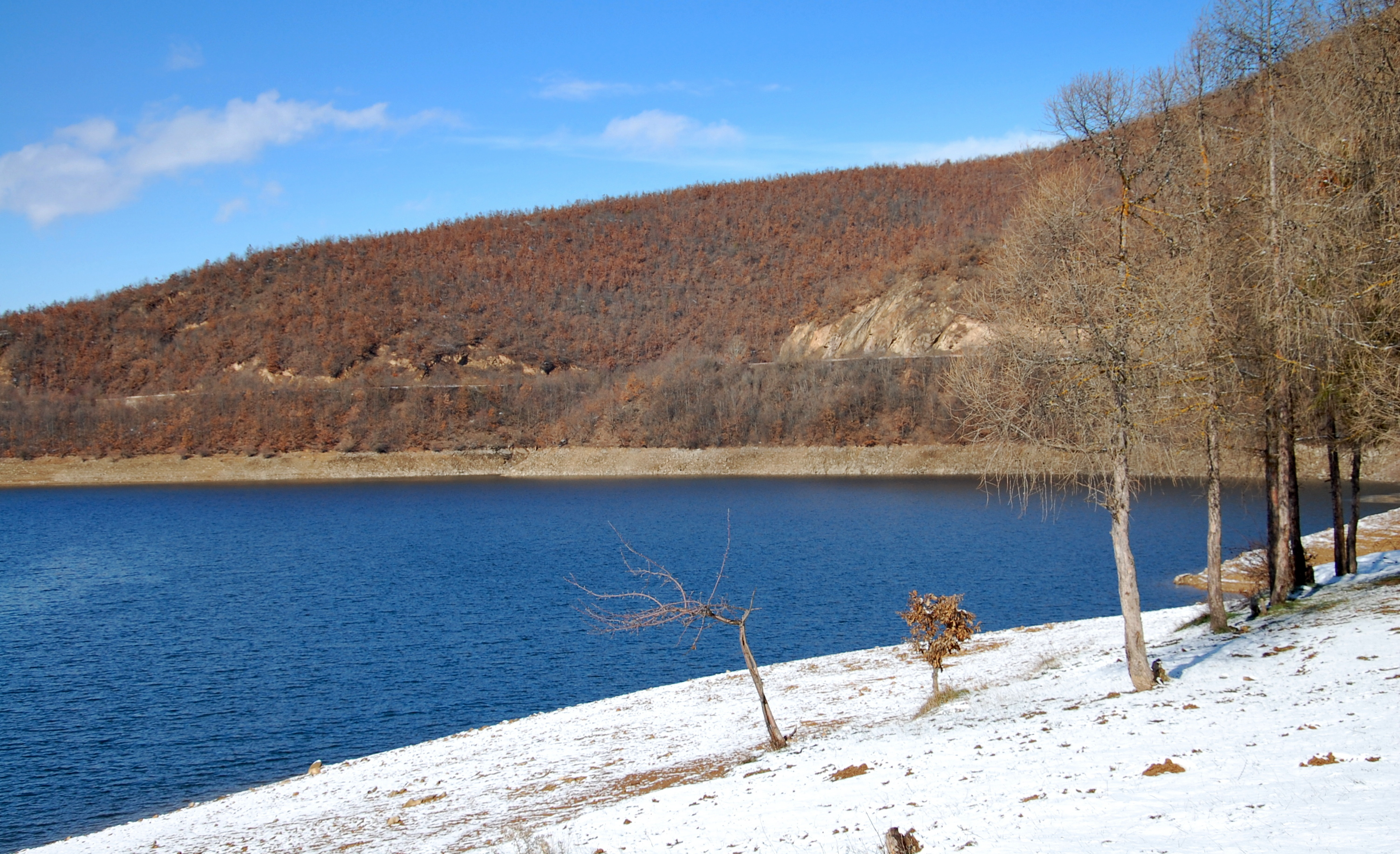
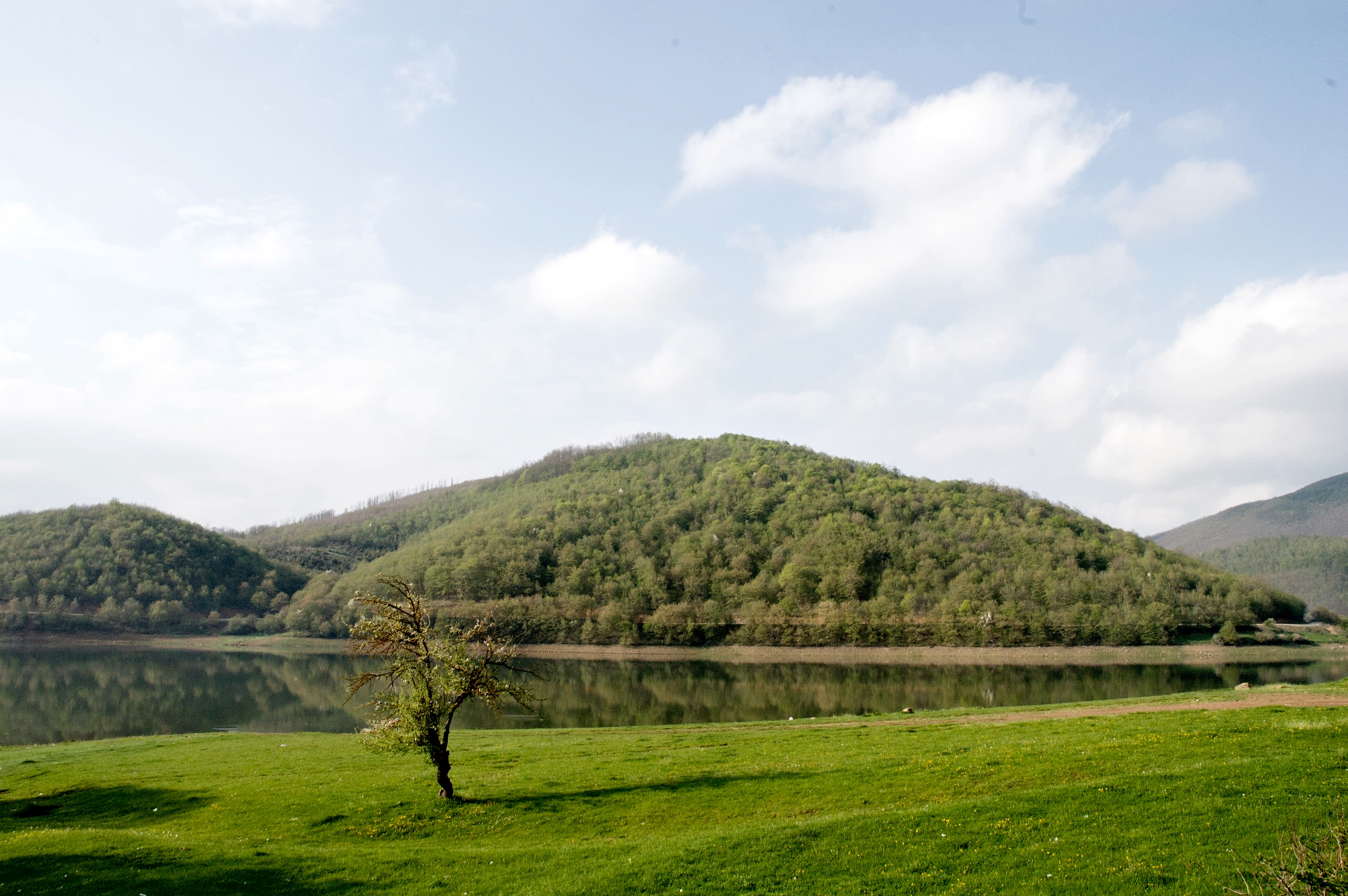

== See also ==
- List of lakes of Kosovo
- Tourism in Kosovo
- Water in Pristina
