= Gračanka =

Location
- Country: Kosovo

Physical characteristics
- Mouth
  - location: Sitnica
  - coordinates: 42°36′49″N 21°04′02″E

Basin features
- Progression: Sitnica→ Ibar→ West Morava→ Great Morava→ Danube→ Black Sea

Gračanka (Serbian: Грачанка) or Graçanka (Albanian: Graçankë) (also known as Gračanica/Graçanicë, Грачаница) is a river in Kosovo. Its name is derived from Gradac, a toponym of fortified cities. It flows into the Sitnica near the settlement of Vragoli.

== See also ==
- Rivers in Kosovo
