= Zenel Hajdini =

Albanian partisan

- Born: May 24, 1910; Medveđa, Yugoslavia
- Died: March 7, 1942 (aged 31); Medveđa, Gazdare, Yugoslavia
- Military career
- Allegiance: LANÇ
- Rank: Partisan
- Conflicts: World War II in Yugoslavia: Battle of Kukavica

Zenel Hajdini was an Albanian partisan. He was born on May 24, 1910, in Medvegjë, Medveđa.

== Early life and career ==
Zenel Hajdini, was born in Medveđa, on 24 May 1910 and was killed in Gazdare, near Medveđa, on March 7, 1942. He was participant in the National Liberation War and was one of National Heroes of World War II. He was raised in the village Tupalla, near Medveđa. He attended first two grades of primary school in the Bay of Sijarines and the other two in Medveđa. Due to his poor financial status, he could not continue his education, so he worked in the municipality of Medveđa as a municipal registration office. Although he managed to find a job, his desire for further education did not go away. After two years, he went to Skopje and entered the Madrasa which had a religious character but in which several foreign languages were taught and where empirical subjects occupied a very important place. He received his first lessons at the so-called school "at the Mosque of Siarina". There he completed eight years of high school. After graduating from the Madrasa, he enrolled at the Faculty of Mathematical and Natural Sciences in Belgrade and then enrolled at the Faculty of Philosophy in Skopje, where he remained until the beginning of the war. During the continuation of the second year of studies in Belgrade, the well-known demonstrations of March broke out, where Hajdini took an active part.

As a student, he participated in the work of the National Antifascist Student Liberation Movement. He became a member of the Communist Party in 1941. After the April war and the invasion of the Kingdom of Yugoslavia, Hajdini stopped his studies and came to the village of Tupalla. He started with the clandestine work in preparing the uprising. In August 1941, he joined the partisans and joined the "Kukavica" partisan unit. In the autumn of the same year, a group of fighters from "Kukavica" was assigned to go to Jablanica and form a new detachment there. He took part in the battle of Kukavica, in the battle of Upper Jablania, in the fighting of Kremen, during the capture of Leskovac, Vucja, Labana and other battles in this part of the Southeast in the triangle of Toplica. After the start of the war, Hajdini had returned to his homeland to continue his activity as a member of the staff for the Medvedja region. He was also a member of the Jablanica Party Headquarters. He was killed on March 7, 1942, in Gazdinski Rid, near Medvedja, fighting the Chetnik and the Bulgarians.

== Later years ==
Zenel Hajdini did not agree that Albanians should remain uneducated and thus be dominated intellectually by their Serb compatriots. He had preferred his way of schooling to other compatriots such as Idriz Ajeti (a well-known academic who made an extraordinary contribution in the field of Albanian language), Zeqir Bajrami (university professor and one of the first authors of the book of geography in the Albanian language) etc., who attended classes at the Madrasa of Skopje several generations later. Zenel Hajdini several times had meetings with intellectuals from Kosovo such as Rashid Deda (martyr) from Prizren and others, from whom he had asked to supply him with some primers that they would receive in Albania. This desire, like many others, remained unfulfilled.

== Family ==
Zenel left behind many family members and grandchildren who today live in Priština and abroad (France, the Netherlands, Germany, the US and England). One significant descendant is Hashim Hajdini (son of Zeneli-Hajvaz's brother) who stood out in the Kosovo war. Hashim fought in Kosovo Polje against Serbian police and paramilitary forces who had attacked his home with combat machinery. According to witnesses, more than ten Serbian police and paramilitaries were killed here, while besides Hashim, his two parents Hajvazi and Gjyla also died here. The monument of Hashim Hajdini is located in front of the municipal assembly of Kosovo Polje. Zenel Hajdini was buried in his native Albanian land, where even today his work is commemorated by the locals and the students of the various schools that bear his name.

== Honors ==
A series of monuments in Kosovo and in his birthplace preserve his memory. In Gilan, a gymnasium is named after him. For a while as he worked as a clerk in Medveđa, and was distinguished by his calligraphy. That same year, the first Albanian detachment was established in Kosovo, which was named "Zenel Hajdini" detachment in honor of his name and work. His name was given to twelve primary and secondary schools (in Kosovo, Jablanica and in Macedonia), streets and squares. Some of these schools and streets no longer bear his name because the Serbs changed them after the Kosovo war, but they were later changed by Albanians themselves.
