= Gazdare =

Gazdare Газдаре (Serbian)
- Village
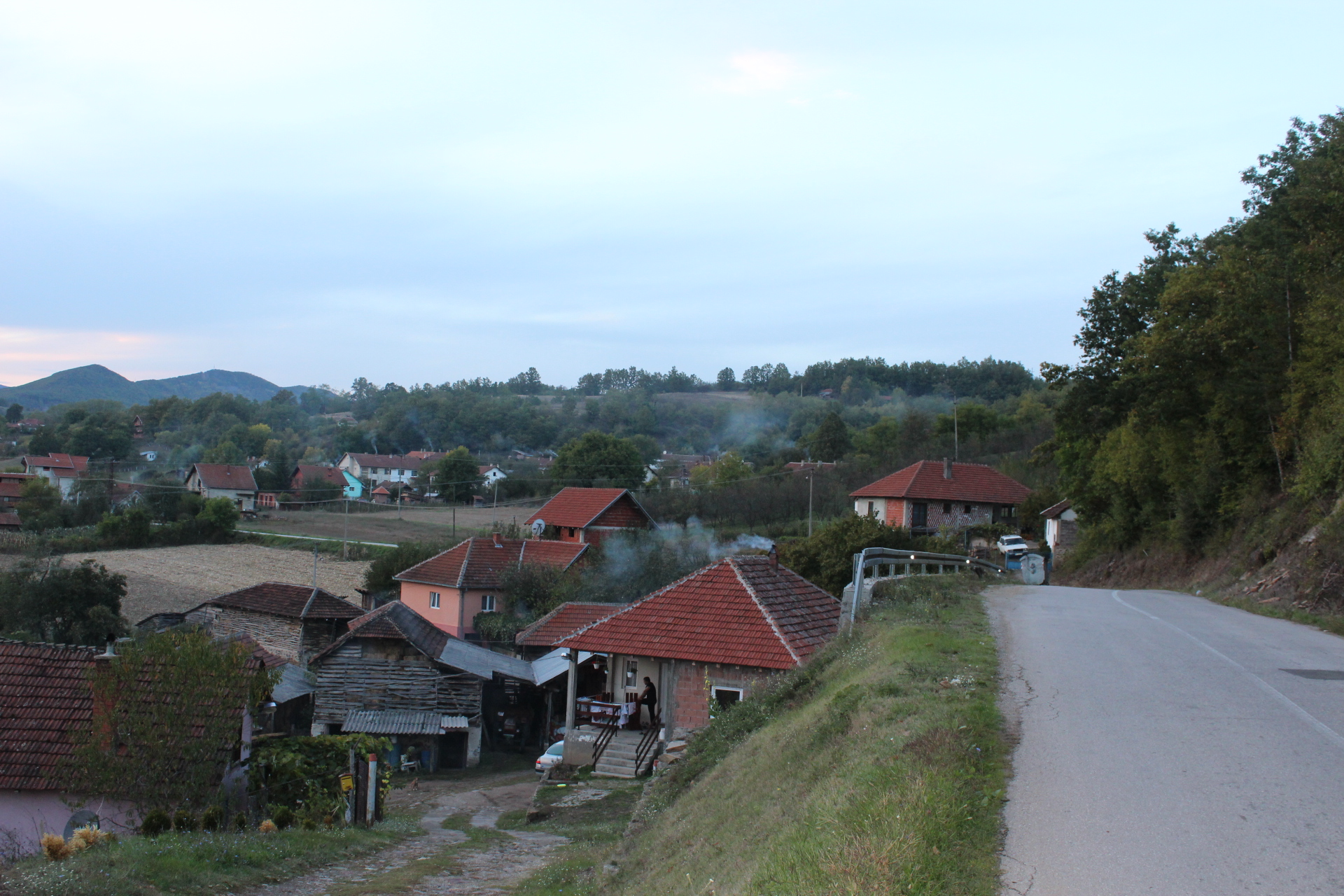

- Location within Serbia
- Coordinates: 42°53′03″N 21°34′17″E
- Country: Serbia
- District: Jablanica District
- Municipality: Medveđa

Population (2002)
  - Total: 571
- Time zone: UTC+1 (CET)
  - Summer (DST): UTC+2 (CEST)

Gazdare is a village in the municipality of Medveđa, Serbia. According to the 2022 census, the village has a population of 362.
