= Gollak =

Historical and geographical region of Kosovo

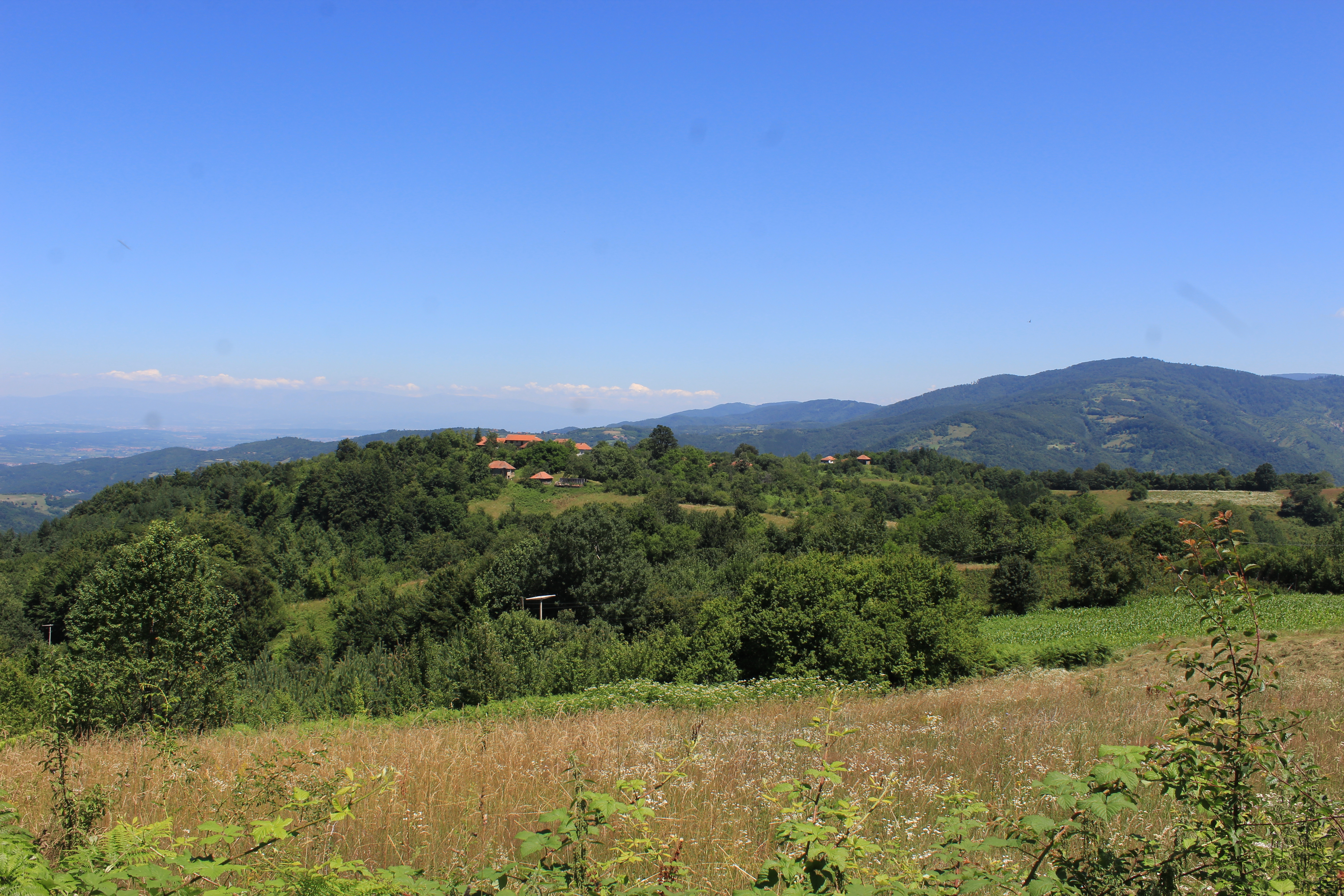

Highest point
- Elevation: 1,260 m (4,130 ft)
- Coordinates: 42°41′30″N 21°41′21″E

Geography
- Country: Kosovo

Climbing
- First ascent: The peak was most likely first ascended by local people (the Galabri tribe)

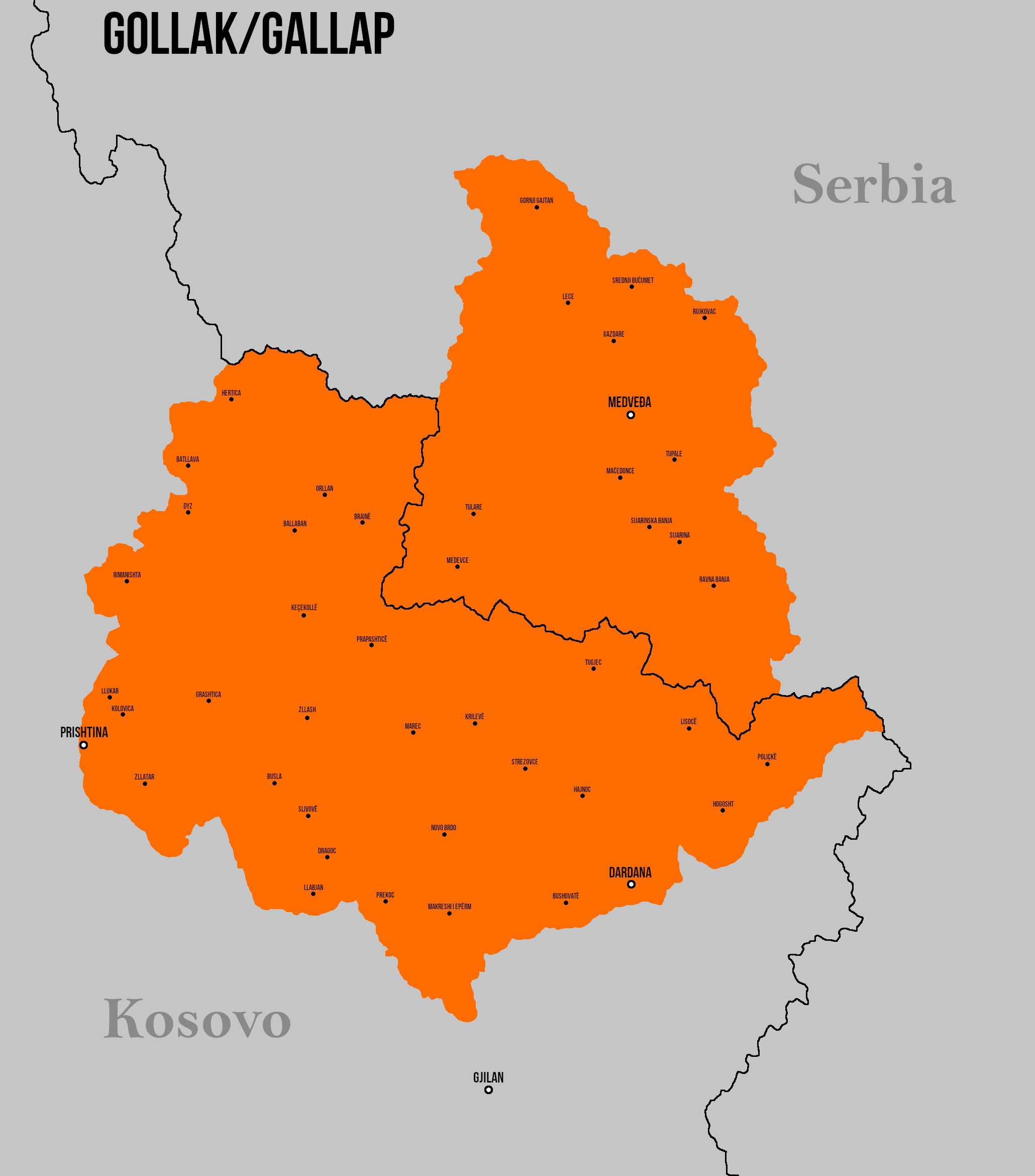
Gollak region location

Gollak (Albanian definite form: Gollaku; Serbian: Гољак, romanized: Goljak) or Gallap (Albanian definite form: Gallapi) is a mountainous and ethnographic region in the eastern part of Kosovo and partially in Serbia, bordering the Llap region to the North, the Kosovo field to the west, the Anamorava valley to the south and straddling along the border with Serbia. The cities of Pristina and Gjilan in Kosovo are located by the mountains. The highest peak, Bjeshka e Artanës, has an elevation of 1260 meters 1,260 m (4,134 ft) above sea level. Gollak itself is split into Upper Gollak and Lower Gollak.

== Etymology ==
The toponym Gallapi is connected to the ancient Dardanian tribe Galabri.

== Environment ==
The Gollak region consists mainly of forests and pastures, and the altitudes vary between 800m-1260m above sea level. The climate of the region is influenced by continental air masses, and so Gollak has cold winters and hot summers. The temperature averages at 12.6 degrees Celsius, and the average sub-zero temperature stands at -5.8 degrees Celsius. Gollak's total annual precipitation is 667mm/year. There is a diverse range of flora and vegetation due to the diversity present within the climate, the mountainous environment and the compositions of both soil and geology in the region - the variance between altitudes and the variation of other ecological factors have culminated in different vegetation zones upon Gollak's vertical profile, which is characterised by forest and herbaceous plant communities.

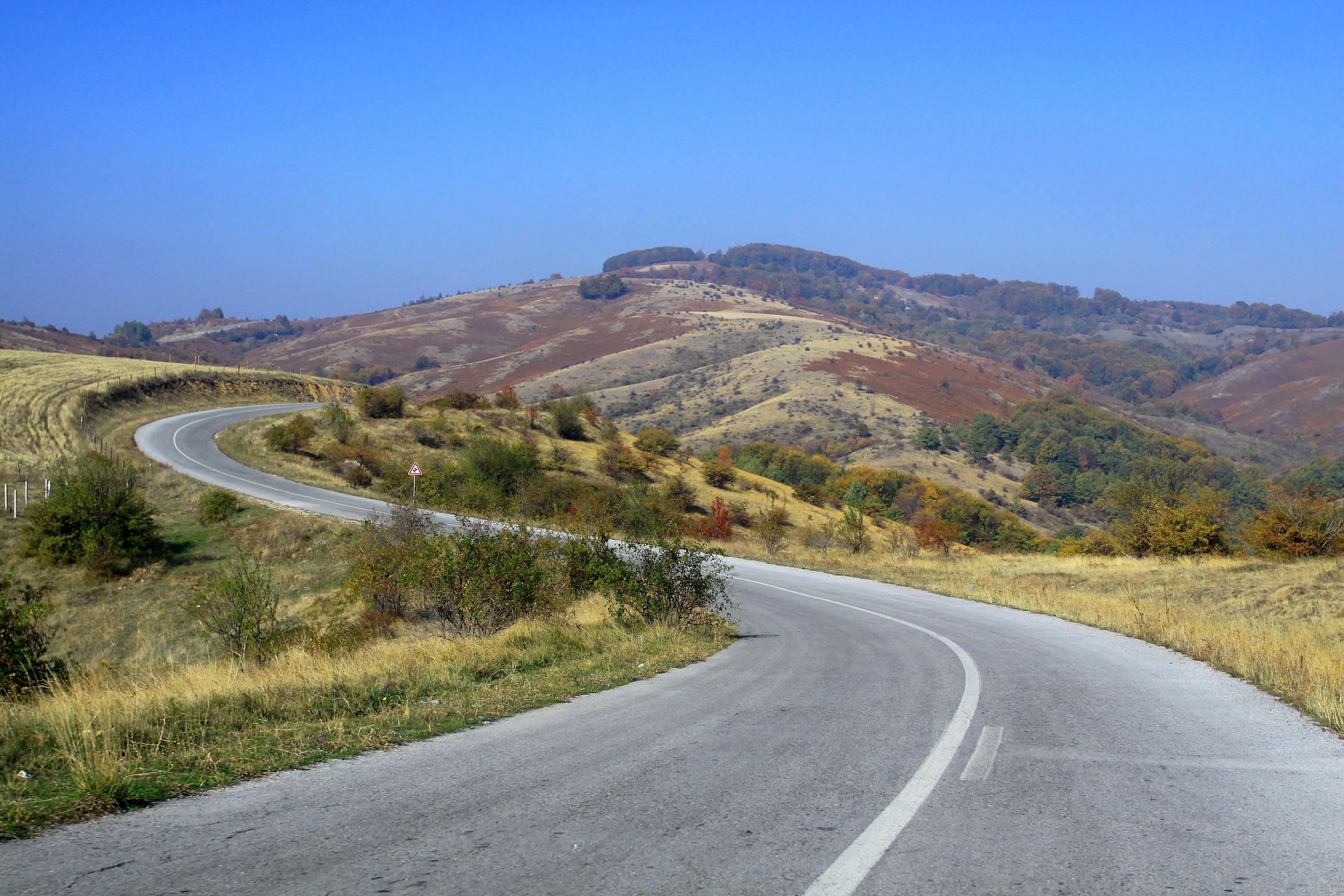
The landscape within Gollak region

There was an ethnobotanical field study conducted in 37 villages of the Gollak region that focused on the traditional uses of medicinal plants, wild food plants and mushrooms. In total, 66 elderly members of these villages were interviewed - from this information, it was discovered that 98 taxa (belonging to 47 different families) are utilized in the traditional medicines and foods of the region. These taxa included 92 angiosperms (of which 76 are dicotyledonous and 6 monocotyledons), 6 mushroom species and 3 gymnosperms, with the predominant families being rosaceae, asteraceae, lamiaceae and alliaceae. Approximately two thirds of the medicinal species recorded were wild. The majority of the wild plants collected within the Gollak region are used for medicinal purposes, whilst 16% were used for food and some other taxa were gathered to be sold at local markets. The most frequent medical problems targeted by these medicinal plants were respiratory system illnesses, skin inflammations and gastrointestinal troubles.

== History ==
=== Ottoman Period ===
In the 15th century the Albanian toponym Guribard was recorded in the region, which indicates an Albanian presence. Gollak at the time was located in the Sanjak of Viçitrina. In the may of 1834 there was an Albanian revolt in Gollak. In the 1877-1878 expulsion of the Albanians from the Sanjak of Niš, many muhaxhirs settled in Gollak. During the League of Prizren there were revolts in Gollak, notably the Battle of Slivova occurred at the time. It was one of the regions that had a strong role in the theme of Albanian independence and was a vital part of its foundation. Gollak and Llap rebelled against the Ottomans in the Albanian revolt of 1910 with 10,000 men. In the Albanian revolt of 1912, 12,000 Albanian rebels gathered outside of Pristina in order to occupy the town. Within this group were Albanians from the district of Pristina, led by Isa Boletini, Xhemal bey Pristina and Beqir aga Vushtrria, and they had previously defeated the Ottoman Turks in Llap and Gollak. Idriz Seferi saw much action in the Gollak region.

=== Yugoslav period ===
In 1920 and 1921 there were Albanian revolts in the region of Gollak.

=== World War ===
During the German occupation of Kosovo in World War II, three Albanian villages were burnt down by German forces on 3 May 1941.

== Demographics ==
There are around 70 villages in Gollak. It mainly consists of small rural settlements. Albanians form the dominant ethnic group in the region. Both Upper and Lower Gollak contain the main villages of the Albanian Krasniqi tribe within the vicinity of Pristina, and they form the dominant tribe in the region.

== Culture ==
As any ethnographic region, Gollak has unique aspects in both culture and language. Certain words - such as Lavesh-i (the extreme ends of the tirq), Mashali-a (an old type of gun) and Toja e opangës (laces made of wool to tie up opinga) - are found only within the Gollak region.

== Notable people ==
- Isa Mustafa, Kosovo Albanian politician
- Behgjet Pacolli, Kosovo Albanian politician and businessman
- Ismet Asllani, KLA commander
- Ajet Sopi Bllata, Albanian rebel
- Zenel Hajdini, Albanian partisan
- Demir Krasniqi, Albanian musician
- Idriz Ajeti, Albanologist
- Nuhi Berisha, Albanian revolutionary of the LRSHJ
- Veli Dedi, Albanian War Commander of LANÇ and the XV International Brigade
- Selim Pacolli, Albanian politician and KLA war soldier
- Haki Demolli, an Albanian politician, lawyer and professor and was the Minister of the Kosovo Security Force
- Salih Mustafa, KLA War Commander
- Isa Kastrati, KLA War Commander
- Bilall Syla, KLA War Commander
- Georgius Pelino, Albanian Catholic priest and diplomat of Skanderbeg
- Kadri Zeka, Albanian revolutionary and activist
