= Kamenica, Kosovo =

Kamenica: Kamenica or Kamenicë (Albanian) Kosovska Kamenica or Косовска Каменица (Serbian)
- Town and municipality
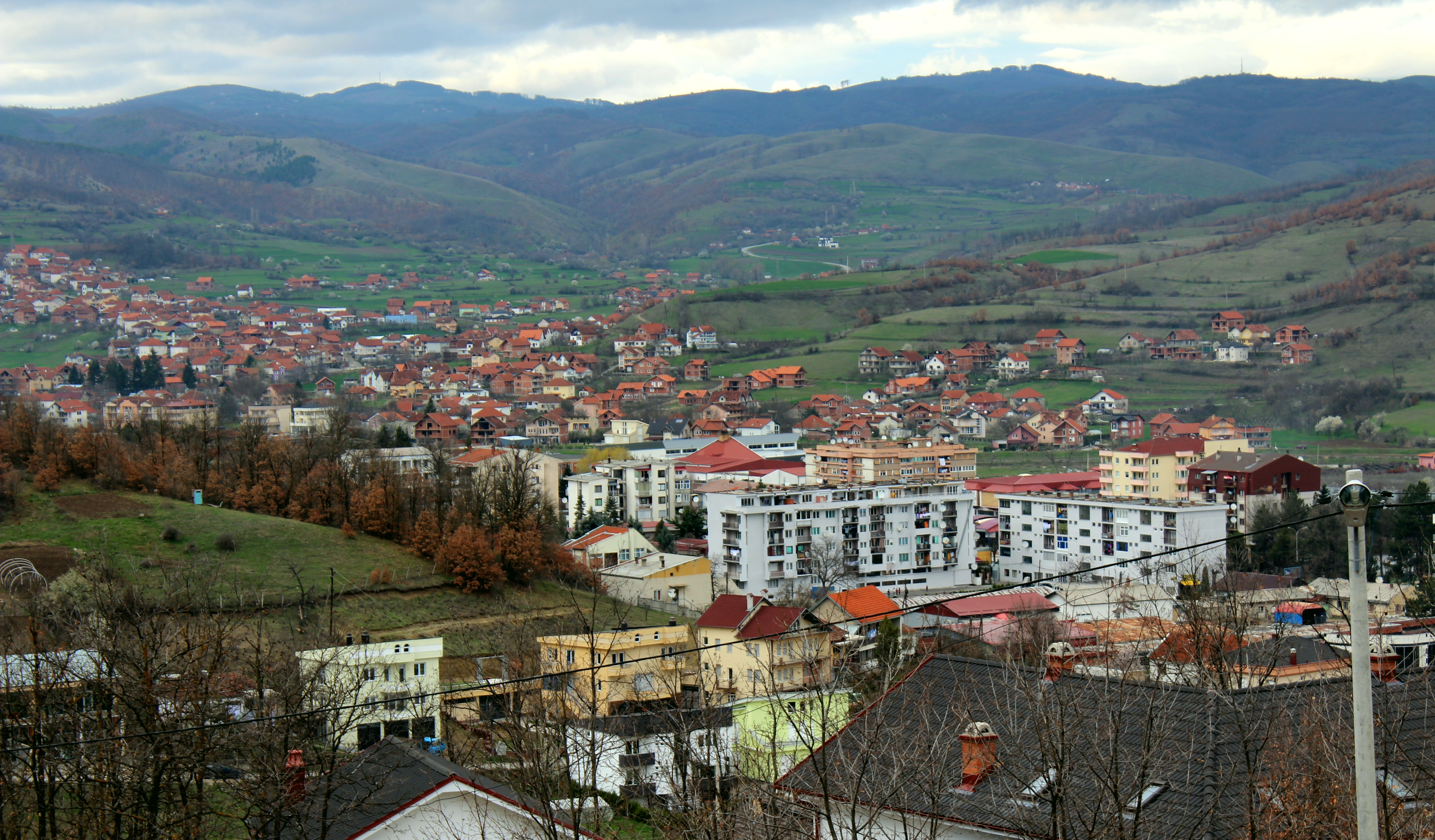
- Panorama of the town of Kamenica

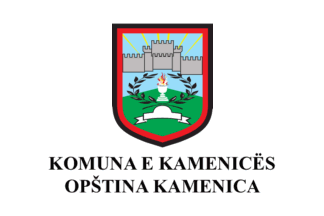
- Flag Emblem
- Interactive map of Kamenica
- Location within Kosovo
- Coordinates: 42°35′02″N 21°34′30″E
- Country: Kosovo
- District: Gjilan

Government
  - Mayor: Kadri Rahimaj (LVV)

Area
  - Municipality: 424 km^{2} (164 sq mi)
  - Rank: 9th in Kosovo
- Elevation: 470 m (1,540 ft)

Population (2024)
  - Municipality: 22,868
  - Density: 53.9/km^{2} (140/sq mi)
  - Urban: 5,206
  - Ethnicity: 89.9% Albanians; 8.2% Serbs; 1.9% Other
- Time zone: UTC+1 (CET)
  - Summer (DST): UTC+2 (CEST)
- Postal code: 62000
- Area code: +383 280
- Vehicle registration: 06
- Website: kk.rks-gov.net/kamenice

Kamenica or Dardana (Albanian indefinite form: Kamenicë or Dardanë), or Kosovska Kamenica (Serbian Cyrillic: Косовска Каменица), is a town and municipality located in the Gjilan District of Kosovo. According to the 2024 census, the municipality of Kamenica has 22,868 inhabitants, while the town has 5,206 inhabitants.

== History ==
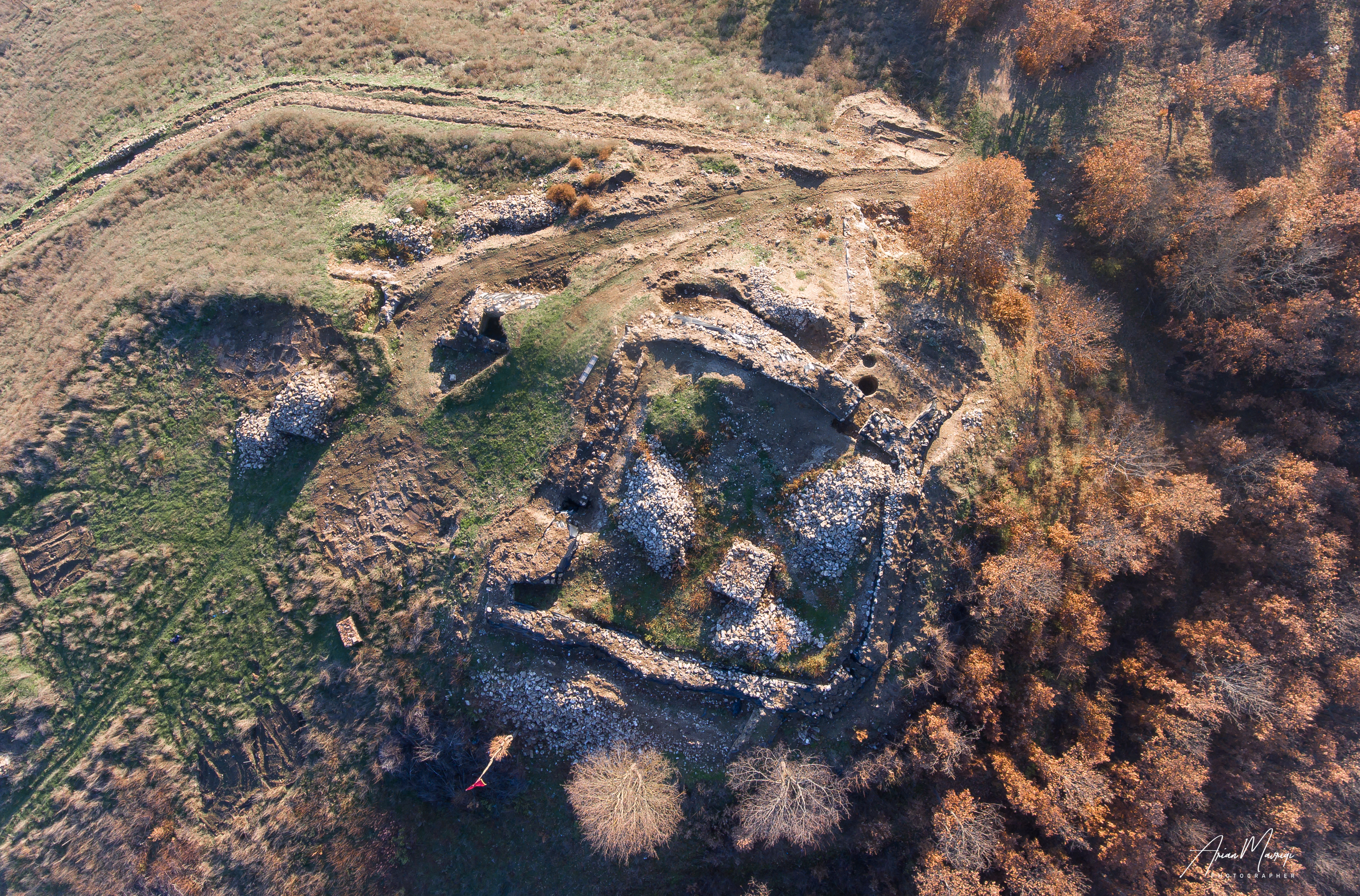
The Dardana Fortress

The Kamenica area, like the rest of Kosovo, was historically inhabited by the Dardani tribe, an Illyrian people. Archaeological evidence of their presence has been found at the Dardana Fortress site, which was later reconstructed during the late Roman period.

During the Yugoslav era, Kamenica was known for maintaining relatively strong inter-ethnic relations. Today, tensions remain low, largely because the area experienced less violence than many other regions during the Kosovo War.

== Geography ==
The municipality of Kamenica is situated in eastern Kosovo, characterised by hilly and mountainous terrain. It forms part of the geographical and ethnographic region of Gollak and shares borders with Ranillug to the southwest, Novobërda to the west, Pristina to the northwest, and Serbia to the north and east. Gjilan is located 30 km (19 mi) away, while Pristina is around 75 km (47 mi) away from Kamenica.

== Demographics ==
Municipal historical population
| Year | Pop. | ±% p.a. |
|---|---|---|
| 1948 | 37,677 | — |
| 1953 | 39,977 | +1.19% |
| 1961 | 43,058 | +0.93% |
| 1971 | 46,505 | +0.77% |
| 1981 | 48,320 | +0.38% |
| 1991 | 52,152 | +0.77% |
| 2011 | 36,085 | −1.82% |
| 2024 | 22,868 | −3.45% |
Source: Division of Kosovo

According to the 2024 census conducted by the Kosovo Agency of Statistics, the municipality of Kamenica has a population of 22,868. The ethnic composition is predominantly Albanian, accounting for 89.9% of residents, followed by Serbs at 8.2%, with other ethnic groups making up the remaining 1.9%.

== Politics ==
Elections for the Mayor and the Municipal Assembly are held every four years. Voters receive two separate ballots: one to select a candidate for Mayor from various political parties, and another to choose a representative for the Municipal Assembly from a specific party or independent list.

== Notable people ==
- Azem Vllasi, politician and lawyer
- Donat Rrudhani, footballer at FC Luzern
- Demir Krasniqi, musician
- Ermir Lenjani, footballer at FC Schaffhausen
- Leotrim Kryeziu, footballer at FC Prishtina
- Musa Hajdari, athlete
- Nuhi Berisha, revolutionary and founder of the People's Movement of Kosovo
- Qëndrim Ismajli, footballer at KF Tirana
- Rexhep Malaj, patriot and a symbol of Albanian national resistance
- Rrahim Beqiri, as known as Komandant Roki, KLA military officer
- Tina Ivanović, singer of Turbo-folk

== See also ==
- Municipalities of Kosovo
