= Second cabinet of Ramush Haradinaj =

Second Haradinaj Cabinet
- Twelfth cabinet of Kosovo
- 9 September 2017 – 3 February 2020
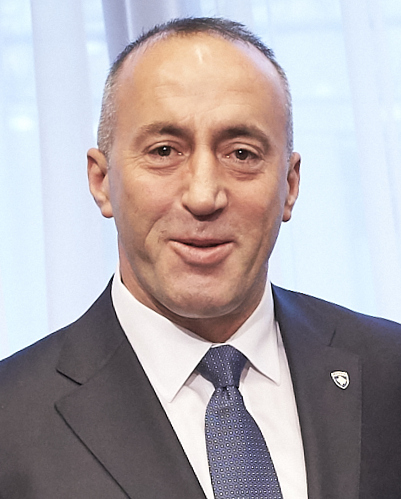
- Date formed: 9 November 2017
- Date dissolved: 3 February 2020

People and organisations
- Head of state: Hashim Thaçi
- Head of government: Ramush Haradinaj
- Deputy head of government: Behgjet Pacolli
- Member parties: PDK AAK NISMA AKR
- Opposition parties: LDK LV PSD SL

History
- Outgoing formation: 19 July 2019
- Election: 2017
- Legislature term: 6th legislature of the Assembly
- Predecessor: First Cabinet of Isa Mustafa
- Successor: First Cabinet of Albin Kurti

The second Haradinaj cabinet was formed the government of Kosovo from 9 September 2017 upon the defeat of Isa Mustafa and the LA Coalition in the 2017 elections to 3 February 2020 following its defeat in the 2019 parliamentary election. The cabinet was made up of members of the PANA Coalition and some members of the opposition.

== Composition ==
The cabinet comprised the following ministers:

Portfolio	Minister	Took office	Left office	Party
Prime Minister of Kosovo	Ramush Haradinaj	9 September 2017	3 February 2020	AAK
First Deputy Prime Minister	Behgjet Pacolli	9 September 2017	3 February 2020	AKR
Deputy Prime Minister	Fatmir Limaj	9 September 2017	3 February 2020	NISMA
Deputy Prime Minister	Enver Hoxhaj	9 September 2017	3 February 2020	PDK
Deputy Prime Minister	Dalibor Jevtić	9 September 2017	3 February 2020	SL
Deputy Prime Minister	Dardan Gashi	9 September 2017	3 February 2020	AKR
Minister of Foreign Affairs	Behgjet Pacolli	9 September 2017	3 February 2020	AKR
Minister of Communities and Returns	Dalibor Jevtić	9 September 2017	3 February 2020	SL
Minister of Diaspora	Dardan Gashi	9 September 2017	3 February 2020	AKR
Ministry of Defence	Rrustem Berisha	9 September 2017	3 February 2020	AAK
Minister of Infrastructure	Pal Lekaj	10 September 2017	3 February 2020	AAK
Minister of Finance	Bedri Hamza	9 September 2017	26 November 2019	PDK
Minister of Health	Uran Ismaili	9 September 2017	3 February 2020	PDK
Minister of Culture, Youth and Sports	Kujtim Gashi	9 September 2017	3 February 2020	PDK
Minister of European Integration	Dhurata Hoxha	9 September 2017	3 February 2020	PDK
Minister of Justice	Abelard Tahiri	9 September 2017	3 February 2020	PDK
Minister of Innovation and Entrepreneurship	Besim Beqaj	9 September 2017	3 February 2020	PDK
Minister of Labour and Social Welfare	Skender Reçica	9 September 2017	3 February 2020	NISMA
Minister of Education, Science and Technology	Shyqiri Bytyqi	9 September 2017	3 February 2020	NISMA
Minister of Trade and Industry	Bajram Hasani	9 September 2017	5 September 2018	NISMA
Minister of Trade and Industry	Endrit Shala	1 October 2018	3 February 2020	NISMA
Minister of Internal Affairs	Flamur Sefaj	9 September 2017	30 March 2018	AKR
Minister of Internal Affairs	Bejtush Gashi	13 April 2018	30 September 2018	AKR
Minister of Internal Affairs	Ekrem Mustafa	1 October 2018	3 February 2020	AKR
Minister of Economic Development	Valdrin Lluka	9 September 2017	3 February 2020	AKR
Minister of Environment and Spatial Planning	Fatmir Matoshi	9 September 2017	3 February 2020	AKR
Minister of Administration and Local Government	Ivan Todosijević	9 September 2017	8 April 2019	SL
Minister of Administration and Local Government	Adrijana Hodžić	12 April 2019	3 February 2020	Independent
Minister of Agriculture	Nenad Rikalo	9 September 2017	2 February 2019	SL
Minister of Public Administration	Mahir Yağcılar	9 September 2017	3 February 2020	KDTP
Minister of Rural Development	Rasim Demiri	9 September 2017	3 February 2020	Vakat

== Timeline ==
- 9 September 2017: Ramush Haradinaj and the majority of his cabinet take office.
- 10 September 2017: Pal Lekaj, the Minister of Infrastructure, takes office.
- 26 January 2018: An attempt to dismiss Dardan Gashi failed with only 36 of 88 MPs voting in favor.
- 30 May 2018: Flamur Sefaj, the Minister of Internal Affairs, is dismissed after deporting several Turkish nationals.
- 12 April 2018: The Special Prosecution of Kosovo filed an indictment against Pal Lekaj for corruption.
- 13 April 2018: Bejtush Gashi, the Minister of Internal Affairs, takes office.
- 5 September 2018: Bajram Hasani, the Minister of Trade and Industry, is dismissed.
- 30 September 2018: Bejtush Gashi, the Minister of Internal Affairs, is dismissed.
- 1 October 2018: Endrit Shala, the Minister of Trade and Industry, takes office. Ekrem Mustafa, the Minister of Internal Affairs, takes office.
- 21 November 2018: Kosovo increases tariffs on Serbia and Bosnia by 100%.
