= Driton Çaushi =

Former Kosovar politician

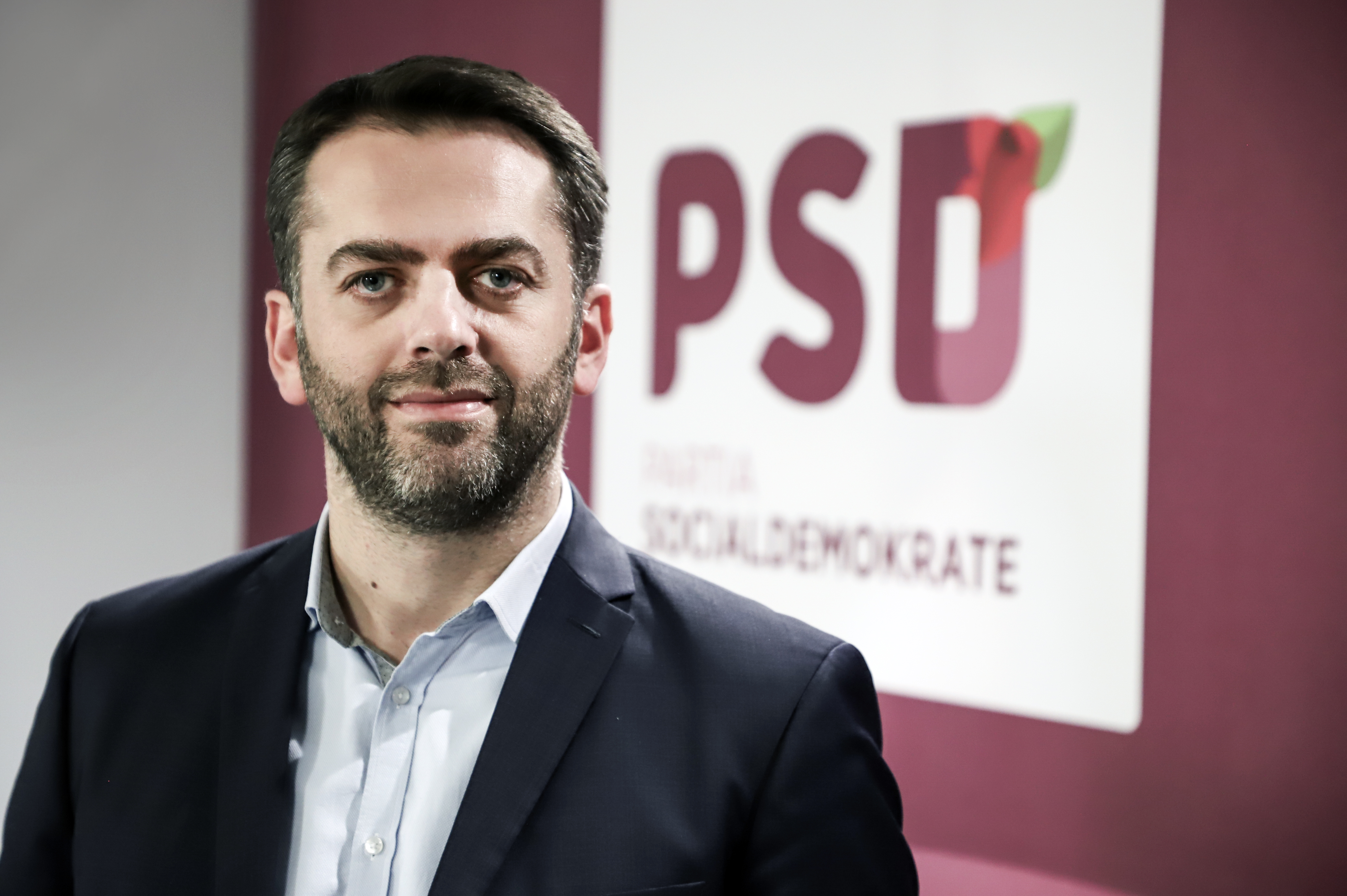
Driton Çaushi

Driton Çaushi (born 11 October 1978) is a politician in Kosovo. He served in the Assembly of the Republic of Kosovo from 2016 to 2019, initially as a member of Vetëvendosje (VV) and later with the Social Democratic Party of Kosovo (PSD).

== Early life and private career ==
Çaushi was born to a Kosovo Albanian family in Gjakova, in what was then the Socialist Autonomous Province of Kosovo in the Socialist Republic of Serbia, Socialist Federal Republic of Yugoslavia. He has taken post-graduate studies at the Free University of Berlin and the Faculty of Veterinary Medicine in Tirana, Albania, and has worked at the University of Pristina's faculty of agriculture and veterinary medicine.

== Politician ==
=== Early years (2013–16) ===
Çaushi appeared in the second position on Vetëvendosje's list for the Gjakova city assembly in the 2013 Kosovan local elections. Assembly elections in Kosovo are held under open list proportional representation; Çaushi finished third among the party's candidates and was not elected when the list won two mandates. Online sources do not clarify if he later entered the assembly as a replacement member.

He was given the seventeenth position on VV's list in the 2014 Kosovan parliamentary election, finished in seventeenth place, and once again missed election as the list won sixteen seats. He was a deputy chair of the party following the election. In November 2015, he called for a proposed border agreement between the Republic of Kosovo and Montenegro to be annulled given a lack of transparency in the process.

=== Parliamentarian ===
==== Vetëvendosje (2016–18) ====
Çaushi received a parliamentary mandate in May 2016 as a replacement for Besnik Bislimi, who had resigned. Vetëvendosje served in opposition in this period. In August 2016, Çaushi disrupted a parliamentary commission on the border with Montenegro by opening a tear gas canister.

He again appeared in the seventeenth position on VV's list in the 2017 parliamentary election, finished sixteenth, and was re-elected when the list won thirty-two seats. VV remained in opposition in the new parliament.

Çaushi was VV's candidate for mayor of Gjakova in the 2017 local elections, which was held four months after the parliamentary election. He finished third and endorsed incumbent mayor Mimoza Kusari Lila of The Alternative in the second round of balloting. Kusari Lila was defeated by Ardian Gjini of the Alliance for the Future of Kosovo (AAK).

==== Social Democratic Party (2018–19) ====
Vetëvendosje experienced a significant split after the 2017 local elections. In March 2018, Çaushi was one of twelve parliamentarians to leave the party and form the Group of the Independent Deputies (GDP). Two months later, the GDP merged into the Social Democratic Party, which had not won any seats in the 2017 assembly election. In this period, Çaushi was a member of the assembly committee on education, science, technology, culture, youth, sports, innovation, and entrepreneurship.

The PSD contested the 2019 parliamentary election in a partnership with the Alliance for the Future of Kosovo. Çaushi was given the hundredth position on their combined list, finished sixty-first, and was not elected when the list won only thirteen seats.

=== Since 2019 ===
In 2021, Çaushi was given a one-year and two months suspended sentence for having opened a tear gas canister five years earlier at a committee meeting that was considering the border demarcation issue with Montenegro.

== Electoral record ==
=== Local (Gjakova) ===
2017 Kosovan local elections: Mayor of Gjakova
Candidate	Party	First round		Second round	
Candidate	Party	Votes	%	Votes	%
Ardian Gjini	Alliance for the Future of Kosovo	17,219	39.88	21,999	53.46
Mimoza Kusari Lila (incumbent)	The Alternative	13,860	32.10	19,152	46.54
Driton Çaushi	Levizja Vetëvendosje!	5,557	12.87		
Ramadan Hoti	Democratic Party of Kosovo	3,506	8.12		
Bekim Ermeni	Democratic League of Kosovo	1,582	3.66		
Fazli Hoxha	Initiative for Kosovo	986	2.28		
Edmond Dushi	New Kosovo Alliance	463	1.07		
Total		43,173	100.00	41,151	100.00
