= LA Coalition =

LA Coalition Koalicioni LA
- Abbreviation: LA
- Spokesperson: Avdullah Hoti
- Founder: Democratic League of Kosovo; The Alternative; New Kosovo Alliance (withdrew)
- Founded: May 2017; 8 years ago
- Dissolved: 22 August 2019; 6 years ago
- Headquarters: Pristina, Kosovo

The LA coalition (Albanian: Koalicioni LA) was a political alliance in Kosovo, between the Democratic League of Kosovo and The Alternative which stood in the 2017 elections along with the New Kosovo Alliance, who left the coalition after the elections. It was founded originally as LAA coalition (Albanian: Koalicioni LAA).

The Democratic League of Kosovo member Avdullah Hoti was the leader of the parliamentary group, and the coalition's candidate for prime minister. The coalition was in opposition and had a total of 27 seats.

== History ==
No single party or pre-election coalition would be able to govern alone in Kosovo, according to the results of the snap elections, held on 11 June 2017. The LAA Coalition came third in the elections behind the PAN Coalition and Vetëvendosje, winning 29 seats, with 32 more seats needed for a majority. Many meetings were held with Vetëvendosje officials to form a coalition so the 61 seats minimum for a majority could be met, but no agreement was ever made.

On 4 September 2017, the New Kosovo Alliance leader Behgjet Pacolli informed the Democratic League of Kosovo leader Isa Mustafa that they were leaving the coalition. A few hours later the New Kosovo Alliance formed the government on 9 September 2017 with the PAN Coalition, which left the LA Coalition in opposition.

The coalition ended in August 2019, when the Kosovo assembly triggered early elections in a vote of no-confidence.
