= 2015 Kosovo protests =

- Date: 6 January 2015 – 3 February 2015 (4 weeks)
- Location: Kosovo
- Goals: Resignation of Aleksandar Jablanović; Return of Trepča Mines as a public institution of the Republic of Kosovo
- Methods: Demonstrations
- Result: Aleksandar Jablanović resigns

Parties
Kosovan opposition: Vetëvendosje!; AAK; NISMA; Anti-government protesters Thirrjet e nënave: Mothers of Kosovo War victims	Government of Kosovo: Kosovo Police; Democratic League

Lead figures
Vetëvendosje!: Albin Kurti; Shpend Ahmeti; AAK: Ramush Haradinaj; NISMA: Fatmir Limaj; Jakup Krasniqi	Government of Kosovo: Isa Mustafa (Prime Minister); Hashim Thaçi (Minister of Foreign Affairs)

Number
7,000–40,000	

Casualties and losses
180 arrested; 20 injured	92 policemen injured

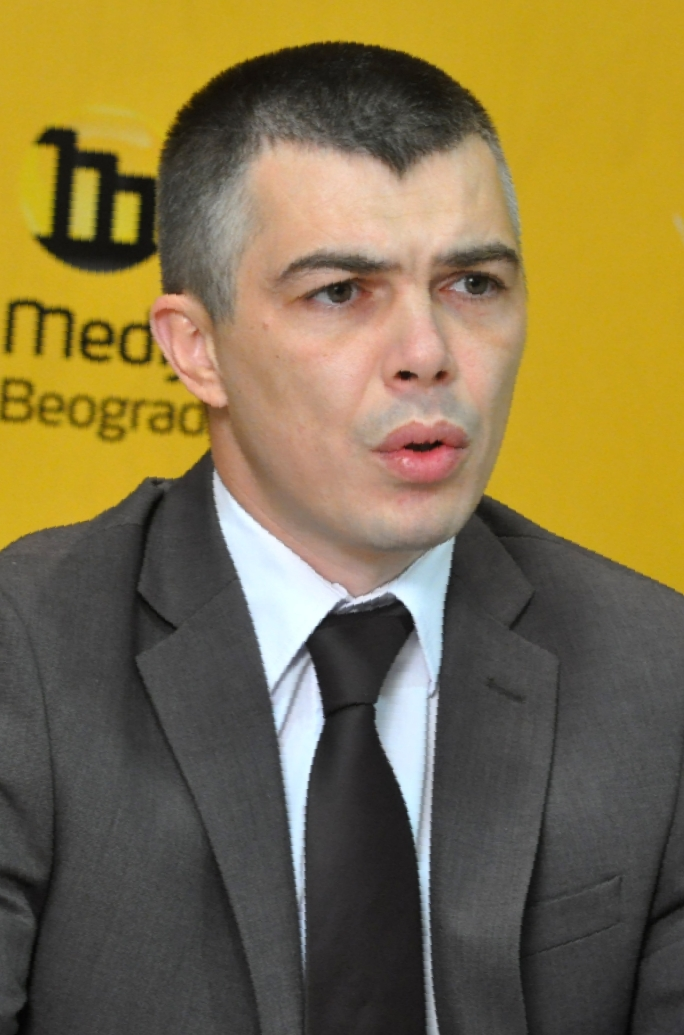
Aleksandar Jablanovic, ethnic Serb Member of the Kosovar Parliament

In early January 2015, a series of anti-governmental protests began in Kosovo, as a result of the statements by Aleksandar Jablanović, a Kosovo Serb politician, Member of Parliament and Minister of Communities and Returns in the Republic of Kosovo.

On 6 January 2015, a group known as Thirrjet e nënave (The call of mothers), whose members are mostly mothers of victims from the Kosovo War, protested in front of the Orthodox Church in Gjakova before Christmas, to block adherents to enter, due to Serbia's ongoing refusal to apologise for the victims. Later that day, Aleksandar Jablanović, Minister of Communities and Returns and member of the Parliament of Kosovo branded as "savages" and "freaks" a group who stoned and blocked the way for buses driving displaced Serbs to Christmas mass in Gjakova. Most of Kosovo citizens were overwhelmingly offended, including the opposition who immediately asked for Jablanović's resignation. The protests after his statements began in Gjakova and continued until 17 January, where around 10,000 people turned to the city center. The demonstrations shortly expanded to Peja, Deçan, Gjilan, and the whole territory of Kosovo. On 19 January, Jablanović formally apologised for his statements.

On 24 and 27 January 2015, national-level protests took place in Kosovo's capital, Pristina, where roughly 50,000 people turned to streets to demand Jablanović's resignation and the return of Trepča as a public institution of the Republic of Kosovo. However, the protests turned violent due to the clash with the police. It was internationally proclaimed as the worst unrest since 2008.

On 3 February 2015, Prime Minister Isa Mustafa announced that Aleksandar Jablanović would no longer be part of the cabinet, and therefore his resignation was confirmed. His resignation was welcomed by the opposition and other citizens, but criticized by the Government of Serbia.

== Background ==
Prior to the local and national protests and the formation of the new government on 9 December 2014, disapproval and anti-governmental actions had already started. At least 20,000 people from Kosovo, whose vast majority were youth, were instantly trying to illegally emigrate to the European Union, through Serbia and Hungary, due to the high unemployment rate.

=== Unemployment and illegal emigration ===
According to a 2014 report by the Kosovo Agency of Statistics, the unemployment rate in the country is 30%, of whom, the unemployment from the age of 15–24 is at 55.9%. Due to the high number of unemployment and the current poverty, roughly 50% of the emigrants were youth between the age of 15–24, who were seeking a better life in the European Union through illegal emigration. Most of them, would enter Serbia and then illegally move to Hungary. The situation gained national attention, and most citizens would blame the government, due to its failure to prevent the emigration and to shrink the unemployment rate. President Atifete Jahjaga and other government official expressed their concern.

=== Trepča status ===
On 14 January 2015, the Government of Kosovo passed a bill to the parliament to return the Trepča Mines, as a public institution of the Republic of Kosovo. The decision was revoked, due to the Serbian government threats; although the government had denied Serbia's intervention, by justifying the decision, saying that a similar move would leave thousands of people unemployed, and announced they would shortly return the mines as an institution of Kosovo.

The move to revoke the bill was widely opposed by Kosovo's citizens and the Kosovan opposition, saying that it was damaging the sovereignty of Kosovo. At the following parliament sessions, opposition's reaction was extremely negative, with most of them, either leaving the assembly, or constantly threatening the position.

United Kingdom's ambassador to the Republic of Kosovo, Ian Cliff said that "Trepça is a property of Kosovo", because it's located in the territory of Kosovo and should therefore be a public institution of the Republic. He was also against putting Trepča as a topic in the Belgrade–Pristina negotiations because it was a matter for Kosovo.

=== January protests ===
Kosovan opposition Vetëvendosje!, Alliance for the Future of Kosovo, Initiative for Kosovo, New Kosovo Alliance and others demanded Jablanović's resignation and the return of the Trepča Mines as a public institution of the Republic of Kosovo. They called for the first national-level protest on 24 January 2015, where thousands of protesters turned to streets, with the motto Jabllanoviq jashtë! Trepça është e jona! (Jablanovic out! Trepça is ours!). The building of the government was damaged. The vandalism was condemned by President Atifete Jahjaga.

The second national-level protest was held at the Mother Teresa square in Pristina on 27 January, supported by Vetëvendosje, AAK, NISMA, Thirrjet e nënave, and most Kosovo Albanian citizens. It began as a quiet and peaceful demonstration with the same requests and motto as the first protest. However, it became very violent when protesters clashed with Kosovo Police. Shpend Ahmeti, Mayor of Pristina was arrested, although he was immediately freed, and other politicians as well. Prime Minister Isa Mustafa and Minister of Foreign Affairs and Deputy PM Hashim Thaçi condemned the protests and the violence. Dozens of protesters were injured, and it was later confirmed that the Kosovo Police had used tear gas.
