= February 2025 Kosovan parliamentary election =

- 9 February 2025
- All 120 seats in the Assembly; 61 seats needed for a majority
- Turnout: 46.55% (▼2.23pp)
Party	Leader	Vote %	Seats	+/–
LVV (Note: Running with GUXO and Alternativa)	Albin Kurti	42.30	48	−10
PDK	Bedri Hamza (Note: Although Memli Krasniqi is leader of the PDK, Bedri Hamza is its candidate for Prime Minister.)	20.95	24	+5
LDK	Lumir Abdixhiku	18.27	20	+5
AAK–NISMA	Ramush Haradinaj	7.06	8	0
Minority seats
SL	Zlatan Elek	4.26	9	−1
KDTP	Fikrim Damka	0.51	2	0
IRDK	Elbert Krasniqi	0.50	1	0
NDS	Emilija Redžepi	0.44	1	0
ZSPO	Nenad Rašić	0.44	1	New
Vakat	Bahrim Šabani	0.37	1	0
PLE	Veton Berisha	0.35	1	+1
SDU	Duda Balje	0.32	1	0
PAI	Etem Arifi	0.23	1	0
JGP	Adem Hodža	0.18	1	0
PREBK	Albert Kinoli	0.14	1	+1
This lists parties that won seats. See the complete results below.
Most voted-for party by municipality & diaspora
Prime Minister before	Prime Minister after
Albin Kurti; LVV	Albin Kurti (acting); LVV

Parliamentary elections were held in Kosovo on 9 February 2025 to elect the 120 members of the Assembly. Following the February election, Vetëvendosje of Prime Minister Albin Kurti remained the largest party, but without an overall majority and no party was able to form the government in what was described as a constitutional crisis. Kurti, who was elected Prime Minister in 2021, remained in office in a caretaker capacity throughout the year until new elections were held in December.

== Background ==
In the 2021 elections, Lëvizja Vetëvendosje (LVV) won 58 seats. They created a coalition with minority parties to form a government. The government was the first since Kosovo's independence in 2008 to complete a full four-year mandate.

=== Electoral system ===
The 120 members of the Assembly were elected by open list proportional representation for a four-year term, with 20 reserved for national minorities. Seats were allocated using the Sainte-Laguë method with an electoral threshold of 5%.

=== Election date ===
According to the constitution, parliamentary elections must be held no later than 30 days and no earlier than 45 days prior to the expiration of the outgoing parliament's mandate. On 31 July 2024, President Vjosa Osmani formally invited the leaders of political parties to a consultative meeting regarding the scheduling of the upcoming elections. In her invitation, Osmani underscored that, in accordance with the constitution and the electoral code, the elections must take place between 26 January and 16 February 2025.

Opposition figures, including Lumir Abdixhiku of the Democratic League of Kosovo (LDK), Ramush Haradinaj of the Alliance for the Future of Kosovo (AAK) and Memli Krasniqi of the Democratic Party of Kosovo (PDK), advocated for elections on 26 January, while Mimoza Kusari-Lila of the Alternativa proposed delaying the elections to 9 or 16 February, citing logistical concerns related to the post-holiday period. Prime Minister and leader of Vetëvendosje (LVV) Albin Kurti did not attend the consultation due to a prior commitment. Concluding, on 16 August, Osmani announced that the elections would be scheduled for 9 February 2025.

== Parties and coalitions ==
The application period for political parties seeking certification and submission of candidate lists for the 2025 elections spanned from 1 September to 11 December 2024. A total of 28 political entities submitted applications, including 20 political parties, five coalitions, two civil initiatives, and one independent candidate, with 1,280 candidates nominated.

On 23 December 2024 the KQZ disqualified the Serb List from the elections. The decision was based on remarks made by the party's leader Zlatan Elek during the presentation of the electoral list, which the KQZ deemed to be nationalistic in nature. The party appealed the decision, calling it "institutional and political violence" against the Serb minority. On 25 December 2024, the Election Complaints and Appeals Panel (ECAP) accepted the appeal, overturning the decision to deny their certification for participation in the upcoming parliamentary elections in Kosovo. The ECAP instructed the KQZ to certify the Serb List for the election.

28 parties and coalitions participated in the election:

General parties and coalitions (100 seats)
No.	Party or coalition	Candidate for prime minister
117	Ballist Party (PB)	Nikoll Perkaj
118	Vetëvendosje (VV); Guxo and Alternativa (candidates run inside VV list)	Albin Kurti
124	Democratic League of Kosovo (LDK); PSHDK (candidates run inside LDK list)	Lumir Abdixhiku
128	Independent	Fatmir Bytyqi
129	Coalition for Family (AKR, PD, LF)	Eman Rrahmani
131	Democratic Party of Kosovo (PDK)	Bedri Hamza
137	Alliance for the Future of Kosovo (AAK), Social Democratic Initiative (NISMA); Conservative List, Intellectual Forum E-30 and Ideal (candidates run inside AAK – NISMA list)	Ramush Haradinaj
138	Fjala	Gëzim Kelmendi

Serbian parties and coalitions (10 seats)
No.	Party or coalition	List carrier
112	Serb List (SL)	Zlatan Elek
116	Serb Democracy (SD)	Aleksandar Arsenijević
120	Party of Kosovo Serbs (PKS)	Aleksandar Jablanović
126	Građanska Inicijativa Narodna Pravda (GI - Narodna Pravda)	Nebojša Milić
132	For Freedom, Justice and Survival (SPO)	Nenad Rašić
133	Srpski Narodni Pokret	Branimir Stojanović

Other minority parties and coalitions (10 seats)
Minority	No.	Party or coalition	List carrier
Ashkali, Egyptian and Romani (4 seats)	111	New Democratic Initiative of Kosovo (IRDK)	Elbert Krasniqi
Ashkali, Egyptian and Romani (4 seats)	114	United Roma Party of Kosovo (PREBK) — LPRK	Albert Kinolli
Ashkali, Egyptian and Romani (4 seats)	115	Egyptian Liberal Party (PLE)	Veton Berisha
Ashkali, Egyptian and Romani (4 seats)	123	Ashkali Party for Integration (PAI)	Etem Arifi
Ashkali, Egyptian and Romani (4 seats)	125	PDAK - Movement for Integration (LpB)	Qazim Rrahmani
Ashkali, Egyptian and Romani (4 seats)	136	Opre Roma Kosova	Sebastijan Šerifović
Bosniak (3 seats)	119	New Democratic Party (NDS)	Emilija Redžepi
Bosniak (3 seats)	121	Our Initiative (NAŠA)	Mirzet Džogović
Bosniak (3 seats)	127	Social Democratic Union (SDU)	Duda Balje
Bosniak (3 seats)	135	Vakat Coalition	Rasim Demiri
Turk (2 seats)	122	Kosova Adalet Türk Partisi (KATP)	Badem Taçi
Turk (2 seats)	130	Innovative Turkish Movement Party (YTHP)	Ertan Si̇mi̇tçi̇
Turk (2 seats)	134	Turkish Democratic Party of Kosovo (KDTP)	Fikrim Damka
Gorani (1 seat)	113	Unique Gorani Party (JGP)	Adem Hodža

== Campaign ==
Election campaigns in Kosovo are regulated to start 30 days before the scheduled election date and must conclude on the day before the election.

=== Governmental parties ===
In August 2024 the governing parties of Vetëvendosje, Guxo and Alternativa announced that they would once again run inside the same electoral list, with incumbent Prime Minister Albin Kurti leading the list. Although initial reports suggested that Guxo and Alternativa preferred a formal coalition.

There has been some infighting within Guxo against their leaders Donika Gërvalla-Schwarz and Faton Peci, both of whom are ministers within the government. On 9 December 2024, the Ferizaj branch announced it would close itself that day, citing discontent with its leaders. On 12 December, the Peja branch called for voters to boycott the election following the publication of the deputy list, which according to them, broke party rules by not including the party name on the list.

=== Opposition parties ===
On 27 March 2024 the Democratic Party of Kosovo (PDK) nominated Bedri Hamza, South Mitrovica mayor and former Minister of Finance, for Prime Minister. This move is allegedly an attempt to focus the campaign on the Economy, which has stagnated under the new government. On November 3 during the convention of PDK, Hamza announced their slogan would be "Kosovo can do better" (Albanian: Kosova mundet ma mirë). Hamza also announced his platform, with the economy being the top priority.

In December 2023, the Democratic League of Kosovo (LDK) published its platform dubbed "Rruga e re" ("The New Road", "The New Path" or "The New Way"). In July 2024, the LDK and Christian minority party PSHDK announced that they would run together in the same electoral list. Lumir Abdixhiku is its candidate for prime minister, serving as LDK leader since 2021.

In January 2024, opposition parties Alliance for the Future of Kosovo (AAK), Social Democratic Initiative (NISMA) and Conservative List of Kosovo (LKK) announced they would run together in a coalition led by Ramush Haradinaj, AAK leader and former Prime Minister. According to the Social Democratic Party of Kosovo (PSD), it too was offered to join this coalition but rejected it due to ideological differences. The coalition was formalized in August 2024 and soon after, the coalition published their platform emphasizing foreign relations and a goal of joining NATO and the EU.

The New Kosovo Alliance (AKR), the Justice Party (PD) and assembly members of the ruling LVV announced the creation of the "Family List" Coalition. The coalition was formed as opposition to the ruling party's attempt to increase LGBTQ rights in Kosovo, specifically the proposed Civil Code which would legalize same-sex civil unions.

=== Campaign issues ===
==== Economy ====
Economic conditions were a major theme of the 2025 campaign. Although Kosovo recorded moderate growth in 2023 and 2024, inflation remained high, reducing household purchasing power. Rising energy prices and increased costs for food and housing contributed to a perception of declining living standards. Unemployment, particularly among young people, continued to be one of the highest in the region, with official estimates ranging between 25 and 30 percent. The combination of limited domestic job creation and higher wages abroad sustained high levels of emigration, especially among skilled workers. Remittances from the diaspora, which represent a significant share of Kosovo’s GDP, remained a key source of household income.

During the campaign, all major parties proposed economic measures. Vetëvendosje promoted policies focused on public investment, industrial support, and the development of domestic energy capacity. Opposition parties, including the Democratic Party of Kosovo (PDK) and the Democratic League of Kosovo (LDK), emphasized private-sector growth, foreign investment, and public-sector reform as paths to job creation. Economic dissatisfaction was widely considered a key factor behind Vetëvendosje’s reduced support compared to 2021.

==== Corruption and governance ====
Governance and corruption were among the defining themes of the 2025 campaign. While the Kurti administration had initially come to power on an anti-corruption platform, by 2025 many citizens expressed dissatisfaction with the pace of institutional reform. Opposition parties, including the Democratic Party of Kosovo (PDK) and the Democratic League of Kosovo (LDK), accused the government of political favoritism in public appointments, insufficient judicial independence, and selective enforcement of anti-graft measures. They argued that Vetëvendosje had replaced previous patterns of party patronage with a new form of political centralization under Prime Minister Kurti’s leadership.

Independent watchdog organizations, including the Kosovo Democratic Institute (KDI) and Transparency International Kosovo, reported some improvement in procurement transparency but highlighted continuing concerns about informal political influence in state-owned enterprises and municipal administrations. Public surveys conducted in late 2024 indicated declining trust in the judiciary and mixed perceptions of the government’s commitment to systemic reform.

Vetëvendosje defended its record, citing an increase in prosecutions for misuse of public funds, the digitalization of procurement systems, and efforts to professionalize the civil service. Opposition parties, however, maintained that these measures were insufficient and accused the government of using anti-corruption initiatives selectively against political rivals.

The debate over corruption and governance became one of the most visible divides of the 2025 election

==== Dialogue with Serbia ====
Following the formation of the government, Prime Minister Kurti declared that dialogue with Serbia would be his 6th or 7th priority, choosing to focus more on domestic issues. On 20 September 2021, Kosovo announced a ban on Serbian license plates being used by Serbian citizens in Kosovo. The government justified this action as retaliation to Serbia not recognizing Kosovan license plates. This however sparked protests in the Serb-majority north Kosovo as well as condemnation from Serbia which threatened military action. On 30 September 2021, the EU had announced they brokered a temporary deal between Serbia and Kosovo, halting the issue for six months.

In July 2022, the Kosovan government announced that Serbian citizens who enter Kosovo will receive entry and exit documents, sparking barricades by local Serbs in Kosovo. This would also cause Serbian politicians and policemen to leave Kosovan institutions. These incidents, alongside continuing tensions over local elections in Serb-majority areas, kept the Serbia-Kosovo dialogue at the center of international diplomatic attention throughout the pre-election period.

==== LGBTQ rights ====
The issue of regulating marriage and civil partnerships for same-sex couples has sparked a clash of viewpoints in the Kosovo Assembly. In March 2022, the Civil Code Draft did not pass its first reading due to strong opposition, particularly regarding the potential legalization of civil partnerships between same-sex individuals. The proposed law would allow for the creation of a separate legal framework to register "civil partnerships" for same-sex couples, but it faced significant opposition from lawmakers and religious leaders, who view it as a redefinition of marriage and family. LGBT community supporters have called for equal recognition of marriage rights, emphasizing that Kosovo's Constitution guarantees the right to marry for all citizens.

In April 2024, Prime Minister Albin Kurti announced plans to pass a new Civil Code in May, which included provisions for civil partnerships between same-sex couples. This would have made Kosovo the third country in the Western Balkans, after Croatia and Montenegro, to legally recognize such unions. However, the vote did not take place in May, and the process has been delayed indefinitely. The proposal faced opposition from some members of Kurti's party and religious leaders in Kosovo, who argued it would redefine marriage and family. The draft defines marriage as a legally recognized union between a man and a woman but allows for civil partnerships between same-sex couples. Despite the delay, Kurti has stated that the legislation will eventually pass.

== Observers ==
The European Union established a team of 100 observers led by French MEP Nathalie Loiseau to monitor the election. They were also joined by observers from other institutions including the Council of Europe. In a statement released following the election on 11 February, the EU monitors praised the election as "peaceful and competitive" while criticising several aspects including the presence of "harsh rhetoric reflecting deep political divisions", the Serb List pressuring voters "who are largely dependent on Serbian social assistance or employment in Serbia-managed institutions in the Kosovo-Serb municipalities", Vetëvendosje trying to prevent the Serb List from competing in the election and engaging in harsh rhetoric against them, and US special envoy Richard Grenell involving himself in the campaign by calling Albin Kurti an unreliable partner of the United States.

== Opinion polls ==
=== National polls ===
Polling firm	Date	LVV			PDK	LDK	Kosovo Winner			For the Family		SL	Others	Abstention	Lead
Polling firm	Date	LVV	A	Guxo	PDK	LDK	AAK	NISMA	CLK	AKR	PD	SL	Others	Abstention	Lead
UBO	9 February 2025	40.3	–	–	21.4	19.3	7.2			1.8		–	–	–	18.9
PIPOS	9 February 2025	38.2	–	–	22.4	20.1	7.6			1		–	10.5	–	15.8
Albanian Post	9 February 2025	37	–	–	23	20	8			1		–	–	–	14
KOHA	9 February 2025	42.3	–	–	21.3	20.4	6.3			2.1		–	4.2	–	21
Alternativa	5 February 2025	52.7	–	–	16.8	14.2	7.6			3.5		–	5.2	–	36.2
UBO	17 December 2024	47.1	–	–	19.5	17.7	6.5			–	–	–	9.1	–	27.6
UBO	3–15 June 2024	49.6	–	0.7	17.0	15.5	8.6			–	–	3.0	7.4	2.6	32.6
Albanian Post	1–10 June 2024	41.1	–	–	19.6	19.2	5.8			–	–	–	5.1	9.2	21.5
ISRN	6 May 2024	38	–	1.5	17.2	18.2	12.4			1.7	–	–	3.7	2.2	19.8
UBO	5 April 2024	49.5	–	0.6	17.1	16	6.9			–	–	5.6	4.3	–	32.4
PIPOS	22 February 2024	40.9	0.1	0.4	20.4	21.5	9.0			–	–	–	0.4	4.6	19.4
UBO	16–23 December 2023	48.5	0.1	0.8	18.2	17.9	6.8	1.5	–	–	–	3.2	3.0	–	30.3
UBO	23 December 2022	42.6	0.2	1.3	19	19.8	7.3	2	–	0.2	–	4.3	3.4	–	22.8
PIPOS	December 2022	35.5	–	1	21.5	22.2	6	2.4	–	0.4	–	–	0.2	–	13.3
UBO	September 2022	37.3	0.3	1.5	21.7	22.3	7.7	1.2	–	0.3	–	5.1	2.1	–	15
PIPOS	August 2022	33.2	0.2	0.9	18.3	21.6	10.1	1.5	–	0.2	–	–	–	–	11.6
PIPOS	7 July 2022	38.1	–	1.2	21.3	25.1	11.9	2.1	–	–	–	–	–	–	13
UBO	18 June 2022	39.6	–	1.3	21.9	20.3	6.7	1.9	–	–	–	4.2	3.5	–	17.7
UBO	May 2022	38.3	–	–	19.7	17.7	6.5	–	–	–	–	–	–	–	18.6
UBO	7–15 March 2022	41.9	–	1.1	21.6	19.4	7.2	1	–	0.4	–	4.2	2.8	–	20.3
PIPOS	12 February 2022	34.7	–	–	21.3	24.1	7.7	0.4	–	–	–	–	0.5	–	10.6
2021 election	14 February	50.3	–	–	17.01	12.73	7.2	2.52	–	with LDK	–	5.09	5.15	–	33.29

=== Seat projections ===
The projections below are calculated according to the opinion polls from above.

Date	LVV	PDK	LDK	AAK	SL	Other	Lead
February 2025	46	24	22	8 (Note: AAK-NISMA-CL coalition)	10	10	22
December 2024	52	21	20	7	10	10	31
June 2024	55	19	17	9	10	10	36
June 2024	49	23	22	6	10	10	26
May 2024	45	20	21	14	10	10	24
April 2024	56	19	18	7	10	10	37
February 2024	45	22	23	10	10	10	22
December 2023	53	20	20	7	10	10	33
January 2023	48	22	22	8	10	10	26
December 2022	42	25	26	7	10	10	16
September 2022	42	24	25	9	10	10	17
August 2022	40	22	26	12	10	10	14
July 2022	40	22	26	12	10	10	14
June 2022	44	25	23	8	10	10	19
May 2022	47	24	21	8	10	10	23
March 2022	46	24	22	8	10	10	22
February 2022	40	24	27	9	10	10	13

=== Leadership approval ===
Dates conducted	Pollster	Sample size	Vjosa Osmani			Albin Kurti			Lumir Abdixhiku			Memli Krasniqi			Ramush Haradinaj		
Dates conducted	Pollster	Sample size	Pos.	Neg.	Net	Pos.	Neg.	Net	Pos.	Neg.	Net	Pos.	Neg.	Net	Pos.	Neg.	Net
6–27 May 2024	UBO	1,200	64%	30%	+34%	59%	35%	+24%	35%	54%	-19%	28%	63%	-35%	21%	66%	-45%

Pollster	Date	Kurti	Abdixhiku	Krasniqi	Hamza	Haradinaj	Limaj	Osmani	Pacolli	Kusari-Lila	Lead
Albanian Post	June 2024	56.4	40.5	28.9	43.7	25.4	–	67.8	–	–	– (Note: Poll asked for the positive opinion and isn't a comparison of leaders.)
Albanian Post	June 2024	45.6	18.6	–	20.5	6.2	–	–	–	–	25.1
PIPOS	February 2024	30.7	21.3	20.5	–	1.89	1.65	30.6	–	–	0.01
PIPOS	December 2022	26.7	20	17	–	7.2	2.9	11.8	0.4	0.4	6.7
PIPOS	August 2022	29.8	29.2	26	–	2.38	2.13	33.7	2.33	2.31	0.39
PIPOS	February 2022	28.9	18.6	13.3	–	6.2	1.5	7.3	0.5	–	10.3

==== Albin Kurti ====
The polls below asked voters for their opinion of Albin Kurti, prime minister of Kosovo since March 2021.

Pollster	Date	Approve	Disapprove	Lead
UNDP	25 July 2024	58.3	41.7	16.6
UNDP	28 February 2024	48.9	51.1	-2.6
UNDP	25 April 2023	51.5	48.5	3.0

==== Glauk Konjufca ====
The polls below asked voters for their opinion of Glauk Konjufca, chairman of Assembly of the Republic of Kosovo since March 2021.

Pollster	Date	Approve	Disapprove	Lead
UNDP	25 July 2024	64.4	35.6	28.8
UNDP	28 February 2024	52.2	47.8	4.7
UNDP	25 April 2023	58.3	41.7	16.6

== Results ==
No party won a majority in the Assembly of Kosovo, with Albin Kurti's Vetëvendosje party receiving around 42,3% of the vote. Turnout was estimated at 41%. The release of official results was delayed by a failure in the election commission's website that was attributed to an increase in user traffic. These were finally released on 15 March.

Party	Votes	%	Seats	+/–
Vetëvendosje (Note: Running with GUXO and Alternativa)	396,787	42.30	48	–10
Democratic Party of Kosovo	196,474	20.95	24	+5
Democratic League of Kosovo	171,357	18.27	20	+5
AAK–NISMA (Note: Running with Conservative List, Intellectual Forum E-30 and Ideal)	66,256	7.06	8	0
Serb List	39,915	4.26	9	–1
Coalition for Family (AKR, PD, LF)	20,023	2.13	0	New
Turkish Democratic Party of Kosovo	4,824	0.51	2	0
New Democratic Initiative of Kosovo	4,688	0.50	1	0
New Democratic Party	4,158	0.44	1	0
For Freedom, Justice and Survival	4,139	0.44	1	New
Vakat Coalition	3,471	0.37	1	0
Serb Democracy	3,271	0.35	0	New
Egyptian Liberal Party	3,251	0.35	1	+1
Social Democratic Union	3,042	0.32	1	0
Ashkali Party for Integration	2,196	0.23	1	+1
PDAK–LpB	2,056	0.22	0	0
Serb National Movement	1,846	0.20	0	New
Innovative Turkish Movement Party	1,800	0.19	0	0
Unique Gorani Party	1,734	0.18	1	0
Our Initiative	1,553	0.17	0	0
United Roma Party of Kosovo	1,350	0.14	1	0
Fjala	899	0.10	0	0
Kosova Adalet Türk Partisi	642	0.07	0	New
Albanian Democratic National Front Party	621	0.07	0	New
Građanska Inicijativa Narodna Pravda	620	0.07	0	New
Party of Kosovo Serbs	462	0.05	0	0
Opre Roma Kosova	384	0.04	0	New
Independents	191	0.02	0	New
Total	938,010	100.00	120	0
Valid votes	938,010	97.07		
Invalid/blank votes	28,273	2.93		
Total votes	966,283	100.00		
Registered voters/turnout	2,075,868	46.55		
Source: KQZ, KQZ

=== Results by municipality or voting provision ===
Municipality	LVV		PDK		LDK		AAK – NISMA		SL		Others	
Municipality	Votes	%	Votes	%	Votes	%	Votes	%	Votes	%	Votes	%
Deçan	4,133	24.96	654	3.95	3,811	23.01	7,656	46.23	4	0.02	302	1.83
Gjakova	21,544	47.92	4,249	9.45	8,035	17.87	8,181	18.20	26	0.06	2,926	6.50
Drenas	4,749	17.66	19,614	72.95	1,147	4.27	744	2.77	5	0.02	626	2.33
Gjilan	24,020	53.12	7,886	16.09	10,362	21.95	1,249	2.42	1,153	2.23	2,169	4.19
Dragash	3,586	26.20	2,732	19.96	3,034	22.17	246	1.80	133	0.97	3,383	28.90
Istog	7,302	36.37	2,454	12.22	6,978	34.75	1,639	8.16	219	1.09	1,486	7.41
Kaçanik	9,153	53.06	5,613	32.64	1,616	9.37	526	3.05	1	0.01	341	1.87
Klina	4,836	26.79	4,800	26.59	3,386	18.76	4,084	22.63	161	0.89	783	4.34
Kosovo Polje	11,996	46.33	5,097	19.69	4,985	19.25	692	2.67	323	1.25	2,797	10.81
Kamenica	8,769	54.41	2,507	15.55	2,198	13.64	1,012	6.28	976	6.06	656	4.06
Mitrovica	21,297	56.71	10,897	29.02	2,924	7.79	505	1.34	35	0.09	1,896	5.05
Leposavić	152	2.21	30	0.44	25	0.36	5	0.07	4,716	68.50	1,957	28.42
Lipjan	12,546	38.97	7,892	24.51	9,089	28.23	771	2.39	371	1.15	1,531	4.75
Novo Brdo	927	17.88	299	5.77	554	10.68	89	1.72	3,073	59.26	244	4.69
Obiliq	6,764	49.03	1,670	12.11	3,257	23.61	213	1.54	1,147	8.31	720	5.54
Rahovec	9,456	40.48	4,600	19.69	3,766	16.12	3,863	16.54	284	1.22	1,389	5.95
Peja	20,282	41.06	4,879	9.88	14,173	28.69	5,883	11.91	489	0.99	3,691	7.47
Podujeva	22,532	50.09	6,344	14.10	13,459	29.92	796	1.77	24	0.05	1,779	4.07
Pristina	60,591	47.78	22,860	18.03	32,164	25.36	4,133	3.26	254	0.20	6,804	5.37
Prizren	30,366	41.39	16,323	22.25	8,644	11.78	3,643	4.97	42	0.06	14,353	19.55
Skenderaj	2,950	12.52	17,730	75.27	937	3.98	1,247	5.29	118	0.50	574	2.44
Shtime	6,905	47.34	4,524	31.02	2,127	14.58	388	2.66	1	0.01	640	4.39
Štrpce	899	13.55	498	7.51	235	3.54	76	1.15	3,980	59.98	947	14.27
Suva Reka	10,585	35.77	5,096	17.22	8,352	28.25	4,916	16.61	4	0.01	630	2.14
Ferizaj	32,047	52.70	15,421	26.36	8,431	13.86	1,833	3.01	1	0.00	3,077	4.07
Viti	11,151	50.88	3,813	17.40	5,372	24.51	966	4.41	65	0.30	551	2.50
Vushtrri	19,673	53.04	9,115	24.57	4,690	12.64	1,004	2.71	788	2.12	1,824	4.92
Zubin Potok	215	5.65	138	3.62	85	2.23	19	0.50	2,535	66.59	815	21.41
Zvečan	147	3.69	89	2.24	18	0.45	4	0.10	2,971	74.65	751	18.87
Malisheva	6,432	27.71	4,724	19.98	3,556	15.04	8,516	36.03	7	0.03	404	1.21
Junik	650	27.02	165	6.86	821	34.12	728	30.26	2	0.08	40	1.66
Mamusha	185	9.02	70	3.41	41	2.00	20	0.98	3	0.15	1,732	84.44
Hani i Elezit	2,171	50.31	1,314	30.45	450	10.43	183	4.24	0	0.00	197	4.57
Gračanica	575	5.83	281	2.85	301	3.05	47	0.48	6,726	68.23	1,928	19.56
Ranilug	22	0.81	9	0.33	12	0.44	3	0.11	2,255	83.27	410	15.04
Parteš	39	1.92	4	0.20	5	0.25	0	0.00	1,768	87.27	210	10.36
Klokot	397	21.28	124	6.65	151	8.09	49	2.63	875	46.89	270	14.46
North Mitrovica	1,032	13.20	350	4.48	61	0.78	28	0.36	4,382	56.05	1,965	25.13
Embassy & Consulate Votes	12,261	80.71	1,175	7.73	1,109	7.30	299	1.97	1	0.01	346	2.27
Total	396,787	42.30	196,474	20.95	171,357	18.27	66,256	7.06	39,915	4.26	67,221	7.16
Including inside of municipalities: Persons with special needs, Conditional and Postal Votes
Source: KQZ

== Aftermath ==
The election resulted in the largest party, LVV, winning 48 seats, short of the 61 needed for a majority. As such, the party was required to seek the support of other parties if it wished to form a coalition. Following the election, both PDK and AAK indicated that they would not form a government with LVV. The LDK later announced that it would not support joining a coalition with LVV, instead proposing a transitional government composing all ethnic Albanian parties, though LVV rejected this.

On 25 March, Turkish Democratic Party of Kosovo leader and concurrent minister of regional development Fikrim Damka was charged with assaulting two supporters of a rival Turkish minority rights party on election day.

=== Speakership election ===
Under Kosovo's constitution, the inaugural session of Parliament must elect a speaker before it can proceed with any other business nor nominate a government. If it fails to do so, the Parliament is reconvened every 48 hours until a speaker has been chosen by an absolute majority, with no set deadline. As LVV received a plurality of the votes, it had the right to propose a candidate for speaker, and it nominated Albulena Haxhiu, outgoing justice minister. Haxhiu, considered a divisive choice by the opposition, was supported by the LVV and some minority deputies, but they fell short of a majority. Little has changed since and, by 27 July, there were 54 votes in total before the deadline set by the Constitutional Court.

To overcome the impasse, there was a proposal to form a commission to oversee a secret ballot, but this was repeatedly rejected by the deputies. Haxhiu has said that if a secret ballot goes ahead and she does not receive the required 61 votes, she would withdraw.

On 26 June, the Constitutional Court ruled that the deadlock must be ended within 30 days (by 26 July). Following the court's decision, President Vjosa Osmani began to meet with party leaders to find an agreement. On 26 July, the last day possible to hold a vote before the deadline, Parliament held two sessions, one at 14:00 (the 53rd) and one at 22:00 (the 54th). Both failed, and as such, MPs were prohibited from taking any action until 8 August.

On 8 August, the Court gave MPs another 30 days to elect a speaker. It however stipulated that no candidate could be proposed more than three times, and that MPs must be present to vote during the sessions. The Court also found that the acting speaker had violated the constitution by continuing to call for a commission to establish a secret ballot.

Through 22–26 August, the Assembly voted 7 times for 5 different candidates (4 from VV, 1 from Guxo!). On 26 August, 73 members (including PDK members) successfully voted for Dimal Basha to become speaker.

Later that week, 5 deputy speakers were to be elected; 4 successfully were, however the Serbian minority deputy failed to secure enough votes, which drew questions over whether the Assembly had been fully constituted. In early September, the Serb List submitted a request to the Constitutional Court to look at the case, and the party refused to recognise the Assembly of Kosovo. The court announced all parliamentary activity would be frozen until 30 September while it debated the case. On 30 September, it ruled that the inaugural session was not properly adjourned due to the refusal to elect a Serbian minority deputy leader. By 7 October, there was no indication that a Serb List candidate would be elected, as parties said they were waiting for the publication of the full decision by the court.

==== Reactions and protest ====
On 5 July, when the 42nd attempt was scheduled to take place, the Parliament was notified of a potential bomb threat. The threat turned out to be false, and the session was held in the evening instead.

There has been much protest surrounding the events. A lawyer, Arianit Koci, has received much press attention for his protests outside the Parliament. On 3 July, he brought four donkeys to the Parliament in protest of how stubborn he claimed the politicians were being, and prior to the 50th failed attempt on 21 July, Koci had his hair shaved in front of the Parliament.

In October 2025, the European Union Ambassador to Kosovo, Aivo Orav, urged political parties to constitute the Assembly and form a government.

=== Government formation ===
Following the election of Basha as speaker, Kurti as leader of the largest party was given two weeks to form a government. On 5 November, President Vjosa Osmani gave Glauk Konjufca two weeks time to form a government after Kurti failed to do so. Konjufca also failed forming a new government and new elections were called for December.
