= 2017 Kosovan parliamentary election =

← 2014	11 June 2017	2019 →
- All 120 seats in the Assembly; 61 seats needed for a majority
- Turnout: 41.16% (▼1.46pp)
Party	Leader	Vote %	Seats	+/–
PAN Coalition	Ramush Haradinaj	33.74	39	−15
LVV	Albin Kurti (Note: Although Visar Ymeri was leader of the LVV, Albin Kurti was its candidate for Prime Minister)	27.49	32	+16
LAA Coalition	Avdullah Hoti (Note: Although Isa Mustafa was leader of the LDK, Avdullah Hoti was its candidate for Prime Minister)	25.53	29	−1
Minority seats
Serb List	Goran Rakić	6.12	9	0
KDTP	Mahir Yagcilar	1.08	2	0
Vakat	Rasim Demiri	0.89	2	0
NDS	Emilija Redžepi	0.49	1	0
SLS	Slobodan Petrović	0.49	1	+1
PDAK	Danush Ademi	0.33	1	0
PLE	Isuf Berisha	0.33	1	0
JGP	Adem Hodža	0.33	1	New
PAI	Etem Arifi	0.29	1	0
PREBK	Albert Kinolli	0.13	1	+1
This lists parties that won seats. See the complete results below.
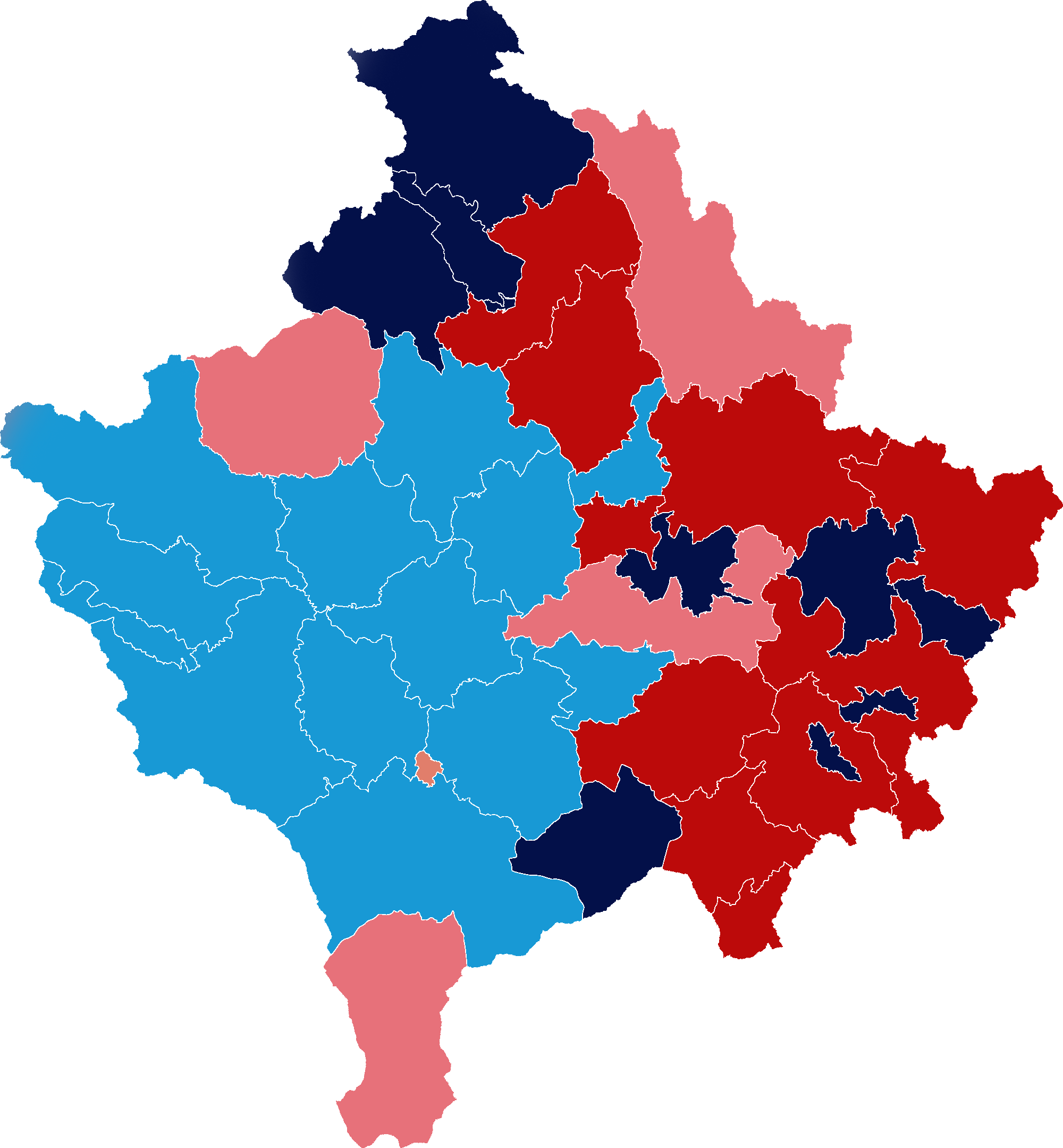
Most voted-for party by municipality
PANA LVV LAA SL KDTP
Prime Minister before	Appointed Prime Minister
Isa Mustafa; LDK	Ramush Haradinaj; AAK

Parliamentary elections were held in Kosovo on 11 June 2017.

== Background ==
The elections were triggered by a motion of no confidence in the government of Prime Minister Isa Mustafa on 10 May 2017 by a vote of 78–34. The motion had been proposed by the Social Democratic Initiative over government failures to meet their campaign promises. The constitution requires fresh elections to be held by 18 June 2017.

== Electoral system ==
The 120 members of the Assembly are elected by open list proportional representation, with 20 seats reserved for national minorities.

== Parties and coalitions ==
Party	Candidate for Prime Minister
PAN Coalition: Democratic Party of Kosovo (PDK); Alliance for the Future of Kosovo (AAK); NISMA; Justice Party; Movement for Unification; Albanian Christian Democratic Party; Conservative Party of Kosovo; Democratic Alternative of Kosovo; Republicans of Kosovo; Party of the Front; Social Democratic Party of Kosovo; Albanian National Front Party	Ramush Haradinaj
Lëvizja Vetëvendosje	Albin Kurti
LAA Coalition: Democratic League of Kosovo (LDK); New Kosovo Alliance (AKR); Alternativa	Avdullah Hoti
Serbian parties (10 seats reserved)
Serb List	
Independent Liberal Party (SLS)	
Progressive Democratic Party (PDS)	
PSK-AGI coalition	
Other minority parties (10 seats reserved)
VAKAT coalition	
SDA-BSDAK coalition	
Unique Gorani Party (JGP)	
Partia e Ashkalinjëve për Integrim (PAI)	
Partia Demokratike e Ashkanlive të Kosovës (PDAK)	
Kosovaki Nevi Romani Partia (KNRP)	
Pokret za Gora (PG)	

== Opinion polls ==
Pollster	Date	PDK coalition	LDK coalition	Vetëvendosje	Fjala Party	Serbian parties	Other parties	Undecided	Abstention	Lead
SDR	7 June 2017	34.2%	40.4%	25.4%	–	–	–	–	–	6.2%
Beta	6 June 2017	33.8%	32.5%	27.8%	–	–	5.9%	–	–	1.3%
Hulumtime “Alternativa”	2 June 2017	46%	27%	21%	–	–	6%	–	–	19%
Kantar TNS Index Kosova	31 May 2017	43%	27%	29%	–	–	1%	–	–	16%
Armend Muja	29 May 2017	41.8%	30.9%	16.9%	–	5.1%	5.3%	–	–	10.9%
Instituti për Hulumtime dhe Analiza Sociale	28 May 2017	40.8%	30.2%	19.5%	2.7%	–	6.8%	–	–	10.6%
Indeksonline	25 May 2017	40.3%	22.1%	16.3%	–	–	3.9%	14.1%	–	18.2%

== Results ==
Party	Votes	%	Seats	+/–
PAN Coalition	245,646	33.74	39	–15
Vetëvendosje	200,138	27.49	32	+16
LAA Coalition	185,892	25.53	29	–1
Serb List	44,578	6.12	9	0
Fjala	7,991	1.10	0	New
Turkish Democratic Party of Kosovo	7,852	1.08	2	0
Vakat Coalition	6,444	0.89	2	0
New Democratic Party	3,561	0.49	1	0
Independent Liberal Party	3,539	0.49	1	+1
Democratic Ashkali Party of Kosovo	2,424	0.33	1	0
Egyptian Liberal Party	2,415	0.33	1	0
Unique Gorani Party	2,369	0.33	1	New
Party of Kosovo Serbs–Active	2,123	0.29	0	New
Ashkali Party for Integration	2,107	0.29	1	0
Progressive Democratic Party	1,697	0.23	0	–1
New Democratic Initiative of Kosovo	1,520	0.21	0	0
Turkish Justice Party of Kosovo	1,438	0.20	0	0
SDA Coalition	1,355	0.19	0	0
Movement for Gora	1,020	0.14	0	0
United Roma Party of Kosovo	955	0.13	1	+1
Kosovar New Romani Party	950	0.13	0	–1
Coalition for Gora	813	0.11	0	–1
Partia Demokratike e Unitetit	478	0.07	0	New
For a Prosperous Kosovo	312	0.04	0	New
Eromendje Alternativa	244	0.03	0	New
Napredna Snaga Kosova	226	0.03	0	New
Total	728,087	100.00	120	0
Valid votes	728,087	93.69		
Invalid/blank votes	49,006	6.31		
Total votes	777,093	100.00		
Registered voters/turnout	1,888,059	41.16		
Source: KQZ, KQZ, KQZ

== Aftermath ==
No party obtained enough seats to form government alone. However, PDK coalition leader Ramush Haradinaj stated that he has the necessary votes to form a government, counting on the 39 seats of his coalition, the 20 seats of the ethnic minorities and some members of the LDK coalition.

After several unsuccessful attempts to elect a new Chairman of the Assembly and a new Prime Minister, on 4 August Behgjet Pacolli announced the AKR's withdrawal from the coalition with the LDK and the formation of a government pact with the PAN Coalition. As a result, the AKR was promised several ministries in the new government, including the Ministry of Foreign Affairs, the Ministry of Interior, the Ministry of Land Management, the Ministry of Agriculture and the Ministry of Economic Development. The PAN Coalition announced that two LDK deputies, Ukë Rugova and Dardan Gashi, would also join the government.

Finally on September 9 the new government was voted, and Ramush Haradinaj was elected new prime minister with 61 votes in favor. This votes include Ramush Haradinaj pre-election coalition PAN Coalition, AKR, the national minorities and the Serb List. The new government included 21 ministers with ethnic Albanians, Bosniaks, Turks and Serbs.
