= Im Dienst des Diktators =

2010 book by Ingrid Steiner-Gashi and Dardan Gashi

Im Dienst des Diktators: Leben und Flucht eines nordkoreanischen Agenten
- Author: Ingrid Steiner-Gashi, Dardan Gashi
- Language: German
- Genre: Biography
- Publisher: Ueberreuter
- Publication date: March 2010
- Publication place: Austria
- Media type: Print
- Pages: 206
- ISBN: 3800074508

Im Dienst des Diktators: Leben und Flucht eines nordkoreanischen Agenten (en: In the Dictator's Service: the Life and Flight of a North Korean Agent) is a biography of North Korean defector Kim Jong Ryul that reveals information on the luxurious lifestyle of North Korea's Eternal President Kim Il Sung and his son Kim Jong Il. Austrian journalists Ingrid Steiner-Gashi and Dardan Gashi authored the book, and Ueberreuter published it in March 2010.

In 2010, Kim Jong Ryul came out to share his experiences as a "shopper" for the North Korean elite after sixteen years of hiding in Austria. Although criticizing Kim Jong Il might endanger his life and his family, Kim Jong Ryul told the Associated Press, "Without this book, I didn't want to die. Now I can die with a clear conscience."

== Content ==
Kim Jong Ryul spent around 20 years fulfilling the wishlists of North Korea's nomenklatura by purchasing and smuggling expensive goods into North Korea. Such items included silk wallpaper, gold-plated handguns, and luxury vehicles. He spent much time operating out of Vienna, Austria. Kim Jong Ryul served as a translator for a group of North Korean chefs instructed to "learn everything" about Austrian cuisine. Kim Jong Ryul and a group of engineers were also assigned to duplicate a Mercedes-Benz.
