= Group of the Independent Deputies =

Group of the Independent Deputies Grupi i Deputetëve të Pavarur
- Leader: Dardan Sejdiu
- Founded: 14 March 2018
- Dissolved: 4 May 2018
- Split from: Vetëvendosje
- Merged into: Social Democratic Party of Kosovo
- Ideology: Social democracy
- Assembly: 12 / 120

The Group of the Independent Deputies (Albanian: Grupi i Deputetëve të Pavarur), also known as GDP, were a parliamentary group in the Assembly of the Republic of Kosovo made up of former members of the Vetëvendosje movement (LV). Dardan Sejdiu was the head of the parliamentary group.

On 4 May 2018, GDP dissolved into the Social Democratic Party of Kosovo.

== Members of Parliament ==
GDP was represented in the Assembly of the Republic of Kosovo by 12 MP's:

- Dardan Sejdiu
- Aida Dërguti
- Visar Ymeri
- Faton Topalli
- Fisnik Ismaili
- Dukagjin Gorani
- Driton Çaushi
- Frashër Krasniqi
- Dardan Molliqaj
- Besa Baftiu
- Salih Salihu
- Shqipe Pantina
