= Endrit Shala =

Minister of Trade and Industry
- In office 1 October 2018 – present
- Prime Minister: Ramush Haradinaj
- Preceded by: Bajram Hasani
- Succeeded by: Rozeta Hajdari

Personal details
- Born: 2 December 1981 (age 44) Pristina, SR Serbia, SFR Yugoslavia
- Party: NISMA

Endrit Shala (born 2 December 1981 in Pristina, Kosovo) is a Kosovar politician. He is a member of the NISMA. Shala is considered to be Fatmir Limaj's right hand and close political partner.

After the Kosovo War of 1999, Shala became a member of the Democratic Party of Kosovo. Shala currently serves as the Minister of Trade and Industry in the government of the Relublic of Kosova.
