= Alternativa (Kosovo) =

Kosovar political party

The Alternative Alternativa
- President: Mimoza Kusari-Lila
- Deputy president: Ilir Deda
- Founders: Mimoza Kusari-Lila; Ilir Deda
- Founded: February 8, 2017
- Registered: July 24, 2017
- Split from: New Kosovo Alliance; Vetëvendosje
- Headquarters: Pristina, Kosovo
- Ideology: Liberalism
- Political position: Centre
- Colours: Dark blue, Gold
- Assembly: 1 / 120
- Mayors: 0 / 38
- Municipal councils: 0 / 994

Website
- alternativaekosoves.org

The Alternative (Albanian: Alternativa) is a liberal political party in Kosovo.

== History ==
Ilir Deda was elected MP for Vetëvendosje in the parliamentary election of 2014. However, during the anti-governmental protests in Kosovo in 2015–16, Deda became a loud critic of his party's support for the acts of violence towards government officials and therefore left the party on 2 April 2016. Similarly, Mimoza Kusari-Lila, former Minister of Trade and Industry and Deputy Prime Minister for the New Kosovo Alliance and current mayor of Gjakova left her party in May 2016 due to the conflicts within the party and ideological differences and decided to join Deda's "new initiative".

Officially launched on 8 February 2017 by MP Ilir Deda and Mayor of Gjakova Mimoza Kusari-Lila in Mitrovica, and on 13 May 2017, General Council of Alternativa decided that Mimoza Kusari-Lila would be president of the party and Ilir Deda would be deputy president of the party.

== Presidents (2017–present) ==
#	President	Born–Died	Term start	Term end
1	Vacant		8 February 2017	13 May 2017
2	Mimoza Kusari-Lila	1975–	13 May 2017	Incumbent

== Ideology ==
In an interview, Kusari-Lila mentioned that human rights are the main importance and priority of the party, thus individual rights.

== Election results ==
Year	Leader	Votes	%	Seats won	+/–	Government
2017	Mimoza Kusari-Lila	Part of the LAA Coalition		2 / 120	New	Opposition
2019	Mimoza Kusari-Lila	Part of Vetëvendosje		1 / 120	▼1	Opposition
2021	Mimoza Kusari-Lila	Part of Vetëvendosje		1 / 120	0	Coalition
Feb 2025	Mimoza Kusari-Lila	Part of Vetëvendosje		1 / 120	0	Snap election
Dec 2025	Mimoza Kusari-Lila	Part of Vetëvendosje Coalition		1 / 120	0	Coalition
2026	Mimoza Kusari-Lila	Part of Vetëvendosje Coalition		1 / 120	0	Coalition
