= Kosovo–Montenegro border demarcation =

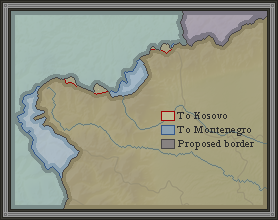
The black line details the new border and the blue/red line shows the transferred territories according to the alleged 1975 border.

The Kosovo–Montenegro border demarcation was a diplomatic agreement between the Republic of Kosovo and Montenegro which was finalized in 2015 about the eventual borders between them. Montenegro acquired its independence in 2006 and Kosovo unilaterally declared independence from Serbia in 2008. As such, there was no border agreement between them. The diplomatic negotiations between the governments of Kosovo and Montenegro came under heavy criticism from both sides.

Around 8,000 hectares (20,000 acres) of land stretching 60 kilometres (37 mi) had remained disputed. An article by Saudi Gazette stated it was roughly 18,900 acres. Montenegro's then-Prime Minister Milo Đukanović stated that "Montenegro does not even need one meter from the territory of Kosovo". The border demarcation deal with Montenegro was one of the explicit requirements by the European Parliament for the visa liberalization process for Kosovo. In 2015, Ramush Haradinaj insisted that the 1974 Yugoslav borders were necessary in order to continue the good relations with Montenegro. The agreement was ratified by both governments in 2015 and was enforced March 2018 leading to Čakor being handed over to Montenegro. The president of Kosovo Hashim Thaçi and Montenegro's prime minister signed the agreement on February 17, 2018. It was ratified in the Kosovar parliament a month later. The agreement has been criticized, as the prohibition to travel within the Schengen area had been lifted for more severe border issues amongst Georgia and Ukraine but not for Kosovo with its less severe border issues.

== Debate ==
A villager named Hajdaraj stated that "they have taken away land that has been passed from father to son for generations; we have graves here, the graves of our forefathers who fought on the other side of the border". Villagers in the Rugova valley vowed to take up arms if the government continued to ignore them. In 2016, The Lëvizja Vetëvendosje accused the PDK party of for the agreement of the Border Demarcation with Montenegro. In 2016, Prime Minister Isa Mustafa met with the Rugova locals opposing the demarcation, but a local stated that he did not address the issue. Levizja Vetendesojes party leader Albin Kurti held a protest speech with 2000 activists leading to the postponement of the demarcation in the Kosovo parliament. In August 2015, Prime Minister Ramush Haradinaj criticized the demarcation. Four years later, in 2019, he met Mujë Rugova, to discuss the finalization of the demarcation. Ibrahim Rugova warned of the demarcation already in 2002.

== Attacks ==
On August 28, 2015, an RTK employee suffered a second attack in his home by a group that opposed the demarcation. An unknown individual tossed an explosive device inside, resulting in no one being hurt. A group called Rugovasit claimed both attacks, warning of more victims if the government continued to ignore the opposition. On August 30, police detained six opposition supporters on suspicion of being involved in a rocket-propelled grenade attack on the parliament. The European and International Federations of Journalists (EFJ/IFJ) condemned the attacks. Violent protests occurred in Pristina with riot police being attacked with Molotovs. An article by Kosova Press writes that the Rugova locals attacked RTK because it supported the demarcation.

== International reports ==
Independent Balkan News Agency published an article explaining that international experts, appointed by Atifete Jahjaga, stated that the demarcation did not breach any laws. The opposition criticized the commission for being too similar to previous commissions. Both Albanian and Montenegrin locals around the borders stated that the politicians should take into consideration the opinions of the public. A report from Saferworld titled Drawing boundaries in the Western Balkans: A people’s perspective, published in 2011, states that failure to resolve demarcation issues and raise border-control standards likewise ensures that parts of the region maintain a reputation for being vulnerable to transnational organised crime, smuggling and people trafficking.
