= PANA coalition =

PANA coalition Koalicioni PANA
- Abbreviation: PANA
- Spokesperson: Ramush Haradinaj
- Founder: Democratic Party of Kosovo; Alliance for the Future of Kosovo; Social Democratic Initiative
- Founded: May 2017; 8 years ago
- Dissolved: 22 August 2019; 6 years ago
- Headquarters: Pristina, Kosovo

The PANA coalition (Albanian: Koalicioni PANA) was a ruling post-electoral Kosovan political alliance between four major Albanian and six ethnic minority parties in Kosovo. Its formation ended three months of political uncertainty following the 2017 parliamentary election. It was founded originally as PAN coalition (Albanian: Koalicioni PAN).

== 2017 election ==
Ahead of the June 2017 election, the nationalist political parties Democratic Party of Kosovo (PDK), Alliance for the Future of Kosovo (AAK), and Social Democratic Initiative (NISMA) agreed to join forces, forming a pre-electoral coalition known as the "PAN coalition" or "War Faction coalition". They aimed to challenge the pre-electoral coalition of moderate parties Democratic League of Kosovo (LDK), The Alternative, and New Kosovo Alliance (AKR). AAK party leader and former Kosovo Liberation Army (KLA) commander Ramush Haradinaj was the coalition's figurehead and candidate for Prime Minister of Kosovo, marking the first time since the end of the Kosovo War that all former KLA commanders had joined political parties. Haradinaj had been accused by Serbia of committing war crimes.

No single party achieved a majority of seats in the election. The PAN coalition won nearly 34% of the vote; to secure the 61 votes (50%+1) needed to form a government, it needed to join with other coalitions. The PANA coalition was formed on September 4 when AKR left its pre-electoral coalition with LDK and The Alternative to join the PAN coalition, along with ethnic minority parties. The new coalition held 63 out of the 120 seats in parliament.

Albin Kurti, leader of the nationalist party Vetëvendosje, commented after the announcement of the new coalition that the formation of a new government was left to Aleksandar Vučić.

== 2019 election ==
Prime Minister Haradinaj resigned in July 2019 after being summoned for questioning by the Kosovan court in The Hague. With his resignation came the fall of his government.

On August 2, President Hashim Thaçi asked the PANA coalition to propose a new candidate for the office of Prime Minister. Other political parties opposed the move and the proposal was unsuccessful.

On August 22, the 6th legislature of the Kosovo's parliament came to an abrupt end as a majority of MPs voted to dissolve parliament before the expiration of its term. This brought a formal end to the PANA coalition due to internal disagreements on the matter.
