= Visar Ymeri =

Kosovar activist and politician

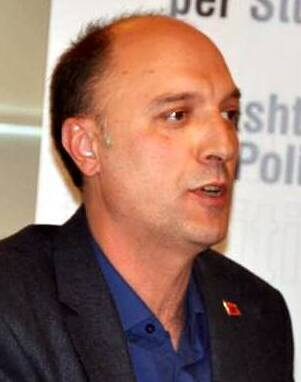

Vice-leader of the Social Democratic Party
- In office 9 May 2018 – 2019
- Preceded by: Kaqusha Jashari

Leader of Vetëvendosje
- In office 1 March 2015 – 2 January 2018
- Preceded by: Albin Kurti
- Succeeded by: Albin Kurti

Personal details
- Born: 11 October 1973 (age 52) Pristina, SFR Yugoslavia
- Party: Social Democratic Party of Kosovo (2018–2019); Group of the Independent Deputies (2018); Vetëvendosje (2005–2018)
- Education: University of Pristina
- Occupation: Sociologist

Visar Ymeri (born 11 October 1973) is a Kosovar activist, analyst and politician who served as the deputy leader of the Social Democratic Party of Kosovo. He led the Self-Determination movement in Kosovo between 2015 and 2018.

== Politics ==
Visar Ymeri was one of the leading members of Vetëvendosje, the largest party of Kosovo. In 2010 he was elected as a deputy of Vetëvendosje and was its chairman in the Assembly of Kosovo. He is also a member of the parliamentary committee for economic development, infrastructure, trade and industry.

Visar Ymeri was elected leader of Vetëvendosje on 1 March 2015, at the General Council meeting, winning 97.42% of the vote.

On 2 January 2018, Ymeri resigned as leader of Vetëvendosje, two months before the end of this mandate, following a crisis within the party.
