= Vetëvendosje =

Political party in Kosovo

Vetëvendosje Lëvizja Vetëvendosje
- Abbreviation: LVV, VV
- Chairman: Albin Kurti
- Parliamentary leader: Arbërie Nagavci
- Founded: 12 June 2005; 21 years ago
- Preceded by: Kosova Action Network
- Headquarters: Rr. Behije Dashi, nr. 31, Pristina, Kosovo
- Newspaper: Përballja
- Youth wing: Rinia e Vetëvendosjes (Kosovo); Forumi Rinor i Koalicionit VLEN (North Macedonia)
- Membership: ▲36,500 (2018 est.)
- Ideology: Social democracy; Democratic socialism; Albanian nationalism; Pro-Europeanism
- Political position: Centre-left to left-wing
- European affiliation: Party of European Socialists (associated member)
- International affiliation: Socialist International; Progressive Alliance
- Colours: Crimson; Black
- Slogan: With heart and mind, to self-determination!
- Assembly of Kosovo: 53 / 120 (44%)
- Mayors: 7 / 38 (18%)
- Municipal councils: 182 / 994 (18%)

Party flag

Website
- www.vetevendosje.org

Vetëvendosje (Albanian: Lëvizja Vetëvendosje, lit. 'Self-Determination Movement', LVV or VV) is a social democratic and democratic socialist political party in Kosovo. It is a member of the Progressive Alliance and the Socialist International, and an observer in the Party of European Socialists.

Vetëvendosje was founded in 2005 as a grassroots, anti-establishment, and pro-independence movement. It gained its initial prominence with protests against the United Nations Interim Administration Mission in Kosovo (UNMIK), and it later protested against the process of negotiations between the Kosovar Albanians delegations and Serbia over Kosovo's independence, claiming that the Kosovar Albanian right to self-determination was not subject to Serbia's approval. A major turning point for Vetëvendosje's position in Kosovo's politics took place in 2010, when the movement expanded its activity and registered as a citizen initiative at the Central Election Commission and ran for the 2010 Kosovan parliamentary election, where it established itself as the third-largest political party in Kosovo.

Owing to its left-wing stance, Vetëvendosje has been described as a populist anti-establishment movement that shows hostility towards Kosovo's politicians on one hand, and international actors that have executive power over Kosovo on the other. It promotes a socialist and welfare-oriented public order, political and civil freedoms, as well as internal and local self-governance and self-determination. On the other hand, Vetëvendosje supports policies to strengthen Kosovo's statehood, including the strengthening of the rule of law, police, and military, which from a traditional sense would be considered right-wing ideas. Despite its sovereignist stance, it still considers that Kosovo should eventually unify with Albania via a referendum, as an expression of the will of the people of Kosovo. They have also been described as an Albanian nationalist movement, with their views being mainly framed based on Albanian history and perceived injustices done by the Serbian state to the people of Kosovo. They see all citizens of Kosovo, including Kosovo Serbs, as victims of Serbia's aggression. The party has no relation to the former Kosovar branch of the SKJ.

Vetëvendosje had its best result ever winning 58 seats (with Vjosa Osmani's Guxo list) in the 2021 election and became the biggest party. In February 2025 it fell to 48 seats and could not form a government, causing a year-long Assembly deadlock with Albin Kurti as caretaker Prime Minister.

In the ensuing December 2025 snap election, Vetëvendosje won decisively with 57 seats. This enabled it to form a government, and in February 2026 the Assembly confirmed Kurti as Prime Minister for a third term (with minority-party support), ending the deadlock.

== History ==
=== Establishment and early actions ===
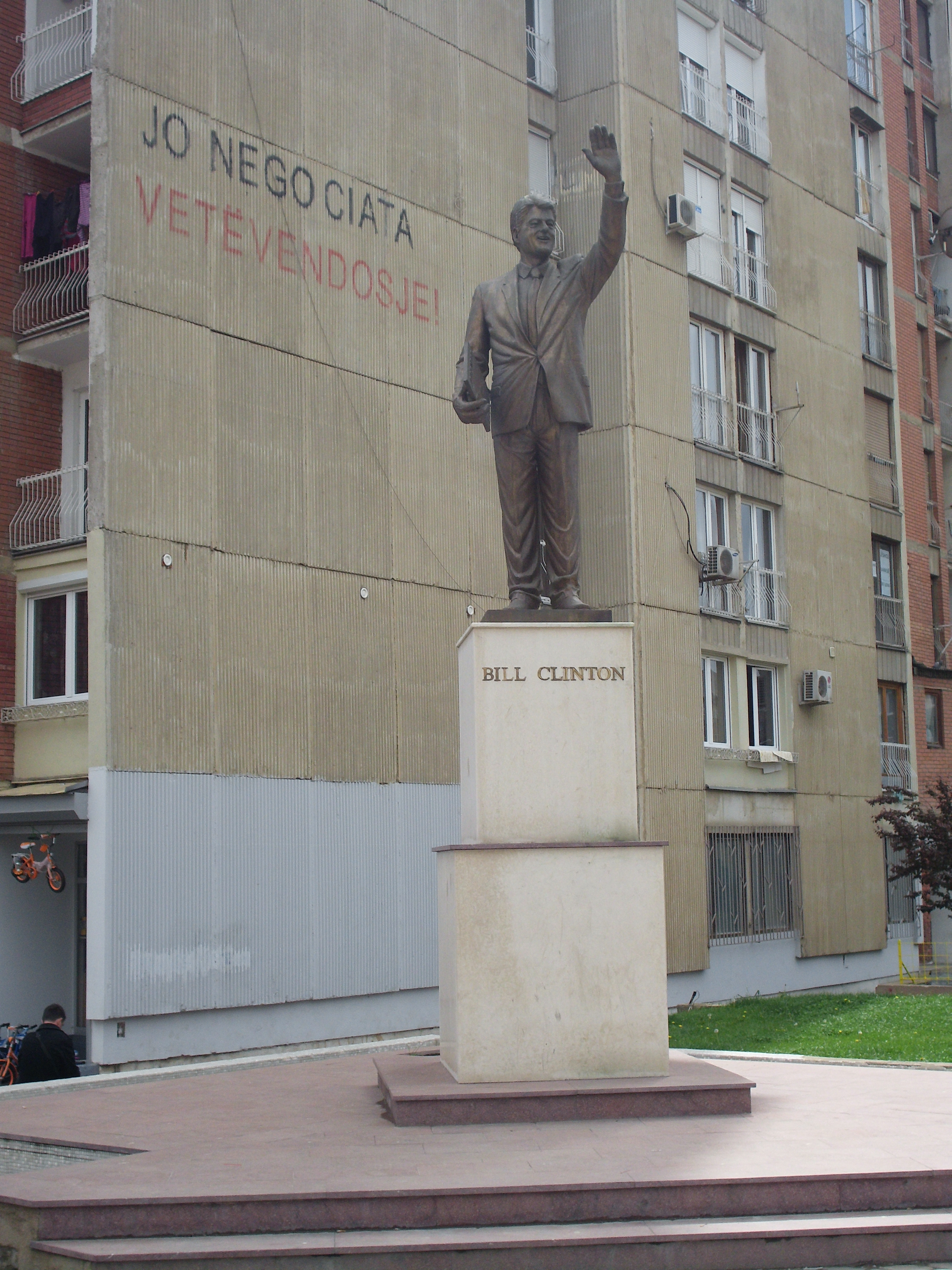
"No negotiations, self-determination" graffiti behind the statue of Bill Clinton in Pristina

Vetëvendosje has its roots in the 1997-founded Kosova Action Network (KAN), a grassroots group promoting active citizenry and direct political participation of the masses. KAN was founded in the United States by a group of international activists that supported the 1997 student protests in Kosovo against the occupation of the campus of the University of Pristina by the Yugoslav Police. During the Kosovo War, KAN participated in documenting war crimes and during 1999 and 2000 KAN campaigned for the release of Albanian prisoners of war held by Serbia. In 2003, KAN moved its headquarters to Kosovo. On 10 June 2004, KAN activists led by Albin Kurti protested against the United Nations Interim Administration Mission in Kosovo (UNMIK), fiercely criticizing its 'undemocratic' character, due to its lack of accountability to Kosovar citizens.

On 12 June 2005, KAN activists wrote the slogan "Jo Negociata – VETËVENDOSJE!" (Albanian for "No negotiations – SELF-DETERMINATION!") on the walls of UNMIK, marking the official transformation of KAN to Vetëvendosje. This was followed by the establishment of Vetëvendosje centers in most municipalities of Kosovo and in countries with a significant Albanian diaspora. On 25 July 2005, Vetëvendosje activists distributed copies of the UN Resolution 1514 in front of the UNMIK headquarters to "remind" it that Kosovo's right to independence was guaranteed by that resolution.

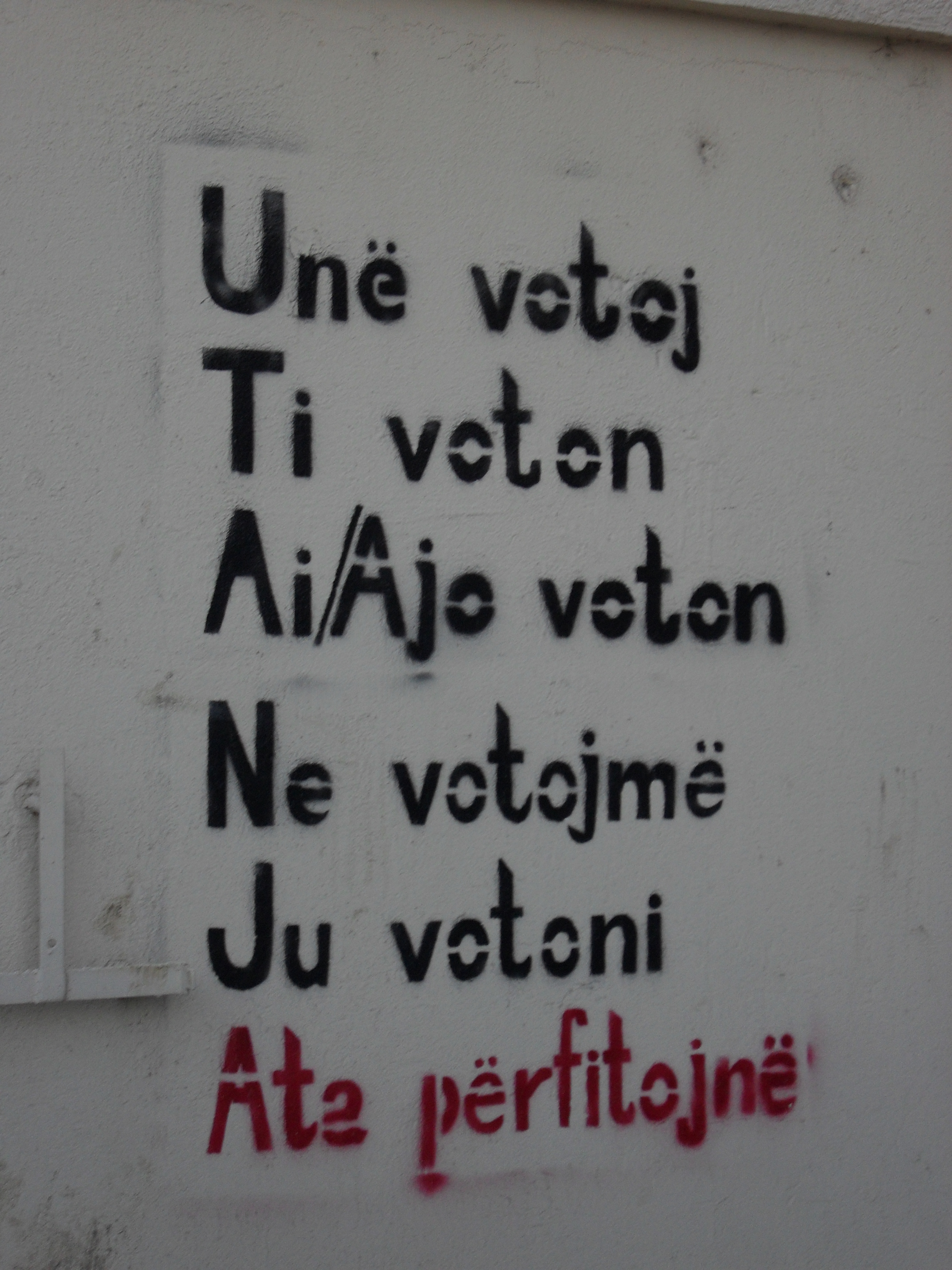
"I vote, you vote, he/she votes, we vote, you vote, they benefit" graffiti in Pristina in 2007, calling for citizens to boycott the upcoming elections

Criticizing UNMIK would become a central theme of Vetëvendosje's activities in the following years leading up to Kosovo's independence. They attempted to delegitimize UNMIK in front of the people of Kosovo by calling it an undemocratic neo-colonial regime whose employees were unelected but nevertheless took executive decisions. They blamed UNMIK for Kosovo's market being flooded by Serbian goods and for the unemployment that resulted from the public enterprises privatization process overseen by UNMIK. In other activities, Vetëvendosje activists opposed the decentralization of local government along ethnic lines and demanded the return of the bodies of missing persons from the Kosovo War, as well as an official apology from Serbia for its crimes committed during the Kosovo War.

Apart from criticizing UNMIK, Vetëvendosje also criticized local politicians, arguing that they did not represent the people but instead served UNMIK and could take no decisions without UNMIK's approval. In addition, it claimed that politicians in Kosovo could only be elected if they were approved by the international community. Therefore, the government was illegitimate. They boycotted the 2007 Kosovan parliamentary election and asked the people not to vote.

=== 2007 demonstration ===
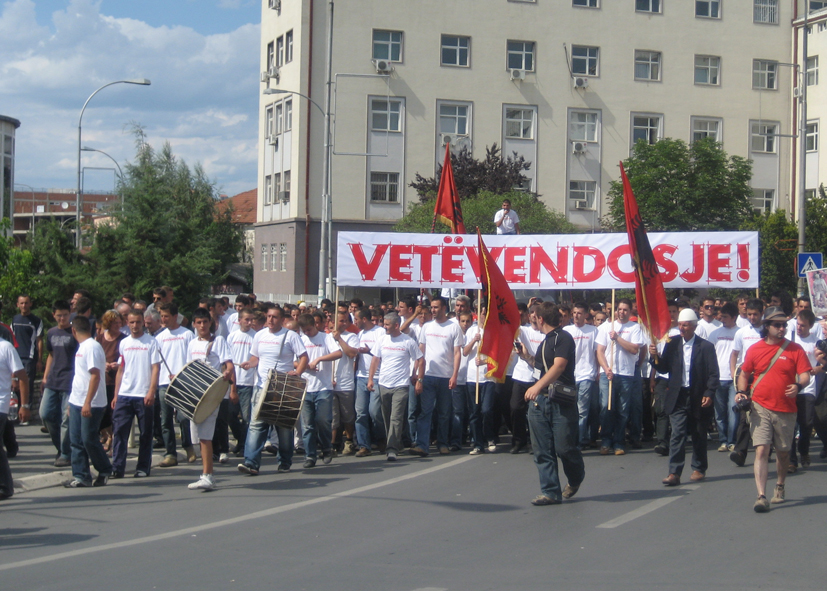
Vetëvendosje protest against the Ahtisaari Plan in 2007

On 10 February 2007 Vetëvendosje organized a large demonstration against the Ahtisaari Plan and against the process of decentralization. The demonstration was attended by more than 60,000 people and took place in the streets of Pristina. UNMIK Riot Police were deployed after the rioters allegedly planned to storm the government offices. The UNMIK police fired tear gas and rubber bullets at the crowd, which resulted in chaos. Two protesters were killed by the police. The first protester was killed while in the crowd, while the second protester was hiding from the tear gas inside Hotel Iliria when he got shot on the head. Apart from the two deaths, the protest resulted in an additional seven serious injuries and 73 minor injuries. One protester who was shot next to his heart survived after a long state of coma and had to live with the projectile inside his chest until his natural death in 2020.

A UNMIK internal investigation revealed that the protesters got killed by out-of-date rubber bullets that were fired from 10 of the Romanian members of the police force, but declined to file charges because it was unclear who of them had fired the fatal shots. On the other hand, the leader of Vetëvendosje, Albin Kurti, got arrested and charged with three offences: leading masses of people believed to have committed criminal offences, calls for resistance, and disruption of police measures. In 2010, an EULEX judge sentenced him to 9 months in prison, but given that he had already spent 5 months in custody and another 5 in house arrest, he got released.

=== Kosovo's independence and Vetëvendosje's entry into active politics ===
Kosovar leaders accepted the Ahtisaari Plan and Kosovo declared its independence in February 2008. The independence was initially supervised by the European Union via its International Civilian Representative for Kosovo (ICRK). Vetëvendosje argued that Kosovo had gone from UNMIK administration to EU administration and factually nothing had changed. It also opposed the idea of Kosovo being a multi-ethnic country, stressing that with Albanians constituting over 90% of the population, Kosovo was one of the most ethnically homogenous countries in Europe, and that minorities should be integrated via socio-economic development, not by dividing people along ethnic lines.

Parallel to this, Vetëvendosje started to slowly shift towards directly participating in the political scene of Kosovo. In 2010 it registered at the Central Election Commission as a 'citizen initiative', to distinguish itself from political parties and to reject accusations that it was becoming part of Kosovo's political establishment, which it had criticized until that point. It would later switch to the status of a political party in 2017 in order to be allowed to enter into pre-electoral coalitions.

Vetëvendosje participated in the 2010 Kosovan parliamentary election and earned 12.69% of the votes, establishing itself as the third-largest political group in the Republic's Assembly. The elections were won by the Democratic Party of Kosovo (PDK) and Hashim Thaçi remained Prime Minister of Kosovo until 2014. During this time, Vetëvendosje combined street protests with active participation in the parliament. In 2012, Vetëvendosje activists and MPs tried to storm the government building in order to stop the privatization of energy distribution. In 2013, Vetëvendosje MPs and activists attempted to physically block MPs of other parties from entering the Assembly building in order to stop the ratification of the Brussels Agreement signed by Kosovo's Prime-Minister Thaçi and Serbian Prime-Minister Ivica Dačić.

=== The establishment of the opposition block (2014–2017) ===
In the 2014 Kosovan parliamentary election, Vetëvendosje emerged as the third largest party having gained just 13.59% of the total votes. PDK came first, but this time it did not have the necessary number of MPs to form a government, giving an opportunity to the second-largest party, the Democratic League of Kosovo (LDK) to establish the government if PDK failed. LDK formed a coalition with the Alliance for the Future of Kosovo (AAK) and the Initiative (NISMA) and Vetëvendosje supported the coalition but refused to join it, because of the support that the coalition would have from the Serb List. Overall, the coalition and its supporters had more than 2/3 of seats in the Assembly and it seemed likely that they would establish the next government if PDK failed. Ramush Haradinaj of AAK was the coalition's candidate for Prime Minister.

The coalition elected Isa Mustafa as speaker of the Assembly, but the Constitutional Court of Kosovo ruled that the election of Mustafa was unconstitutional and that the speaker of parliament belonged to PDK, as the election winner. This led to a crisis and an inability of anyone to form the government, despite the opposition holding over 2/3 of the seats in parliament. In December 2014, LDK abandoned its coalition with the opposition and established a new government in coalition with PDK and the Serb List, with Isa Mustafa as the new Prime Minister. The PDK-LDK-Serb List coalition gave the new government a solid 2/3 majority of seats in parliament, but it also meant that Vetëvendosje now remained the largest opposition party and Albin Kurti became the leader of opposition. Since PDK was very unpopular among the voters of the opposition parties, LDK's move to enable PDK to remain in power was seen as betrayal by Vetëvendosje and it served as a catalyst for the upcoming 2015 Kosovo protests.

The protests started on 6 January 2015 and were led by Albin Kurti. The stated goals of the protests were the resignation of the Serb List minister Aleksandar Jablanović and the return of the Trepça Mines as a public institution of the Republic of Kosovo in order to prevent the privatization of the mines. The protests turned violent with dozens of protesters and Kosovo Police officers being injured.

In the following years, the Vetëvendosje-led opposition protested against the establishment of the Kosovo Specialist Chambers which had the goal of trying leaders of the Kosovo Liberation Army for war crimes. Vetëvendosje supported protests against the establishment of the court in June 2015. In order to prevent the passing of the Specialist Chambers constitutional amendment, as well as to prevent the ratification of a 2015 deal with Serbia for the establishment of the Community of Serb Municipalities, Vetëvendosje MPs set off tear gas within the chambers of the Assembly. This would become a general opposition strategy during this term, since Vetëvendosje did not have the necessary number of MPs to block the passing of legislation.

=== The rise to power ===
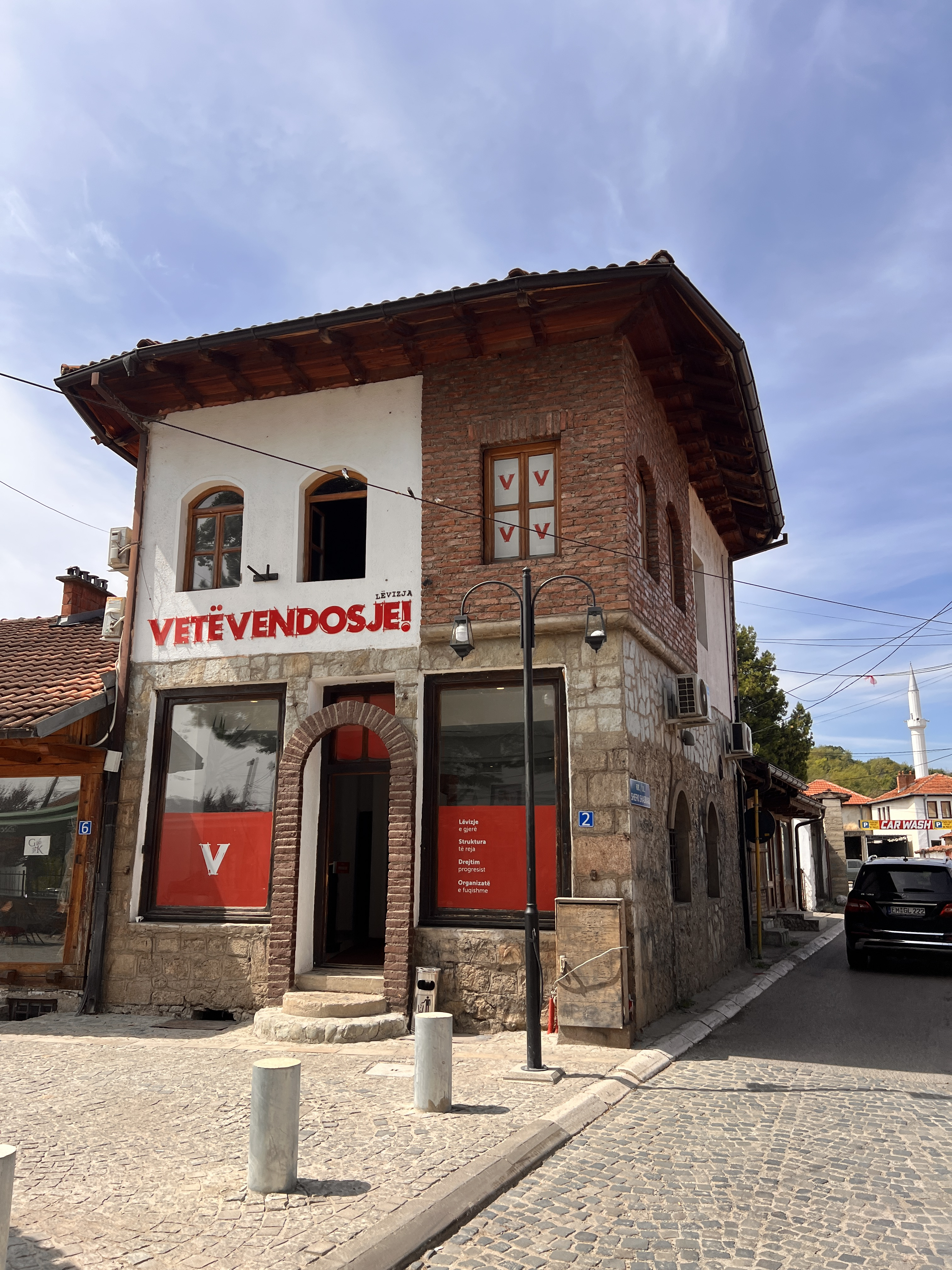
Vetëvendosje local office in Gjakova in 2025.

The 2017 Kosovan parliamentary election saw Vetëvendosje almost doubling in size and earning 27.49% of the votes, but trailing behind the newly-formed pre-electoral PDK-AAK-NISMA coalition. The winning coalition initially did not have the necessary number of MPs to establish the government, but it managed to get the necessary number after taking some MPs from LDK's coalition. The new government led by Ramush Haradinaj was weak and crumbled in 2019 after Haradinaj resigned. This paved the way for the new 2019 Kosovan parliamentary election, after which Vetëvendosje emerged as the first party after a very close race with LDK.

Vetëvendosje and LDK established a coalition shortly after the election and Vetëvendosje's Albin Kurti was elected as the Prime Minister of Kosovo on 3 February 2020. The coalition was short-lived and a couple of months later, LDK left the coalition after Kurti sacked the LDK minister Agim Veliu. This came among disagreements between Kurti and President Thaçi regarding the handling of the COVID-19 pandemic and Veliu siding with Thaçi on the need to declare a state of emergency, which Kurti disagreed with. The Kurti government was overthrown and replaced by a new short-lived government led by LDK, which ended after the Constitutional Court ruled that its election had been unconstitutional.

After the fall of the LDK-led government in late 2020, new elections were held in Kosovo in early 2021. Vetëvendosje won on a landslide, earning 50.28% of the vote and 58 out of 100 electable positions in the parliament. It then formed a coalition with the non-Serb MPs to create a stable government that ended up finishing its entire 4-year term, a first in Kosovo's political history. In the February 2025 Kosovan parliamentary election, Vetëvendosje came first again, but it is not yet clear if it will have the necessary majority to form a government without a coalition with the other major parties in Kosovo.

=== Mergers with other parties and the split of PSD ===
The New Spirit Party (Albanian: Partia Fryma e Re) merged into Vetëvendosje on 31 March 2011. The leader of New Spirit Party, Shpend Ahmeti became vice-chairman of Vetëvendosje and he won the local elections in Pristina in 2013. He would go on to get re-elected as mayor of Pristina in 2017, before leaving Vetëvendosje soon after elections to join the Social Democratic Party of Kosovo (PSD) in early 2018.

The Socialist Party of Kosovo, led by Ilaz Kadolli, joined Vetëvendosje on 26 April 2013. Kurti and Kadolli agreed that the merger would be in the interest of building a strong political and economical state. The party had no representatives in the Kosovo Parliament, but had several in local governments.

The People's Movement of Kosovo (LPK), with its structures in Kosovo and abroad joined Vetëvendosje on 23 July 2013, as stated from both leaders Kurti and Zekaj during the press conference in Vetevendosje headquarters in Pristina: "...with the only aim to change social flow on the benefit of Albanian people". Zekaj stated that LPK had a wide membership within Kosovo and abroad, though he didn't provide numbers. LPK started in 1982 as a Marxist nationalist grouping of Albanian diaspora organizations in Western Europe and is considered the origin of the KLA. Most of its leadership moved on with the newly created party Democratic Party of Kosovo of Hashim Thaçi after the war.

In 2017 and early 2018, a large number of MPs and mayors from Vetëvendosje resigned from the party and joined the already-extant PSD. Among the members who left Vetëvendosje were the former chairman of the New Spirit Party and mayor of Prishtina Shpend Ahmeti, former Vetëvendosje deputy Dardan Molliqaj, and former chairman of Vetëvendosje Visar Ymeri. They were unhappy with the idea of Albin Kurti returning as chairman and accused the party of authoritarianism. In response, Vetëvendosje members accused those leaving that they had misused the party's budget for private gain, and of having sabotaged Vetëvendosje in the 2017 Kosovan parliamentary election and the 2017 Kosovan local elections.

== Party platform ==
Vetëvendosje has been described as centre-left and left-wing that bases its program on three main axes: meritocracy, developmental state, and welfare state. Vetëvendosje supports the free market economy with an active role of the state through ownership of key industries, export promotion and import substitution. Meritocracy, alternatively called justice state by Vetëvendosje, consists of radical transparency, checks and balances, as well as separation of powers and no interference from the government in justice. Finally, the welfare state is supposed to ensure equality of outcomes, and not just opportunities, which is achieved through progressive taxation and protection of minorities and vulnerable groups. Furthermore, Vetëvendosje adheres to Albanian nationalism and populism in its policies regarding Kosovo's future, relations with Albania and ethnic Albanians in the Balkans and the wider diaspora. It is considered as the leading nationalist party in the contemporary Albanian world, and has advocated for the protection of the Albanians in Preševo Valley and North Macedonia as well as a referendum on potential unification of Kosovo with neighbouring Albania. On the European Union, the party has supported Kosovo's membership.

=== Justice state ===
The first pillar of Vetëvendosje's political program is the justice state, through which Vetëvendosje seeks to change legislation, combat corruption and increase citizens' trust on the state institutions. Vetëvendosje wants to amend Kosovo's constitution and to remove, among others, the parts that derive from the Ahtisaari Plan, UNMIK regulations, and Yugoslav legislation. It additionally strives to ensure clear independence for the judiciary and introduce more checks and balances.

Anti-corruption is one of the pillars of the justice state according to Vetëvendosje. In early 2023, the Kosovo parliament passed the Vetëvendosje-sponsored Law for the State Bureau for the Confiscation of Illegal Wealth. The law aims to give the state the means to confiscate wealth whose origin cannot be proven, thus allowing it to combat money laundering and corruption. The law had been part of the party's electoral platform. Vetëvendosje is also pushing for vetting in the justice system intending to remove judges and prosecutors who fail the process. In 2022, the Venice Commission advised in favor of the government's vetting plan.

=== Developmental state ===
The second pillar of Vetëvendosje's program is the developmental state model. Through the developmental state, Vetëvendosje seeks to develop the economy of Kosovo by providing fiscal support to certain sectors of the economy and protecting vital industries from foreign competition.

Vetëvendosje strives to implement progressive taxation on income and sales, as well as introduce changes of the taxes on profits. Its government has already increased property taxes by increasing the valuation of residential buildings in richer areas to increase the tax base. In addition, Vetëvendosje strives for Kosovo to have a common currency with Albania by abandoning the euro, and to establish a state-owned development bank.

In 2023, the Vetëvendosje government established a sovereign wealth fund and is in the process of abolishing the Kosovo Privatization Agency, whose assets are being taken over by the Sovereign Fund. Vetëvendosje constantly criticized the privatization process in Kosovo, calling it "a corruption model, that contributed to increasing unemployment, ruining the economy, and halting the economic development of the country". The newly-established Sovereign Wealth Fund will halt the process of privatization and it will manage Kosovo's public assets, collecting dividends from profitable state enterprises and subsidizing the ones that struggle.

When it comes to environmental issues, Vetëvendosje supports green alternatives to energy production despite Kosovo's endowment with large amounts of lignite. It has vocally opposed the construction of a new coal-powered plant, the Kosova C, and its government refused to connect Kosovo to the Trans Adriatic Gas Pipeline. In 2022, the Vetëvendosje-led government issued a project for the generation of central heating energy via solar energy.

The government of Vetëvendosje has increased agricultural subsidies in its first year in governance by over 200% compared to the budget of 2021. It has also provided large amounts of subsidies to the Trepča Mines, which are managed by a struggling state-owned company. Vetëvendosje considers agriculture and mining a vital strategic interest of Kosovo.

When it comes to education, Vetëvendosje aims to adopt the dual education system, which is mostly practiced in Germany, Austria and Switzerland, countries with significant Albanian diaspora. It sees the switch to the dual education system as necessary to increase the quality of education in general.

=== Welfare state ===
The welfare state is the third pillar of Vetëvendosje's political program. Vetëvendosje wants to combat income inequality, discrimination against women and against minorities. It wants to improve the provision of healthcare services by introducing health insurance based on the Bismarck Model.

Vetëvendosje wants to reform the labor law. It wants to allow fathers to take parental leave, which is allowed only for the mother by the current legislation. Vetëvendosje further seeks to limit working hours to 40 per week and to introduce severance payments for laid-off workers. It further wants to combat informal employment and to increase the power of workers' unions by changing the law on unions.

=== Other issues ===
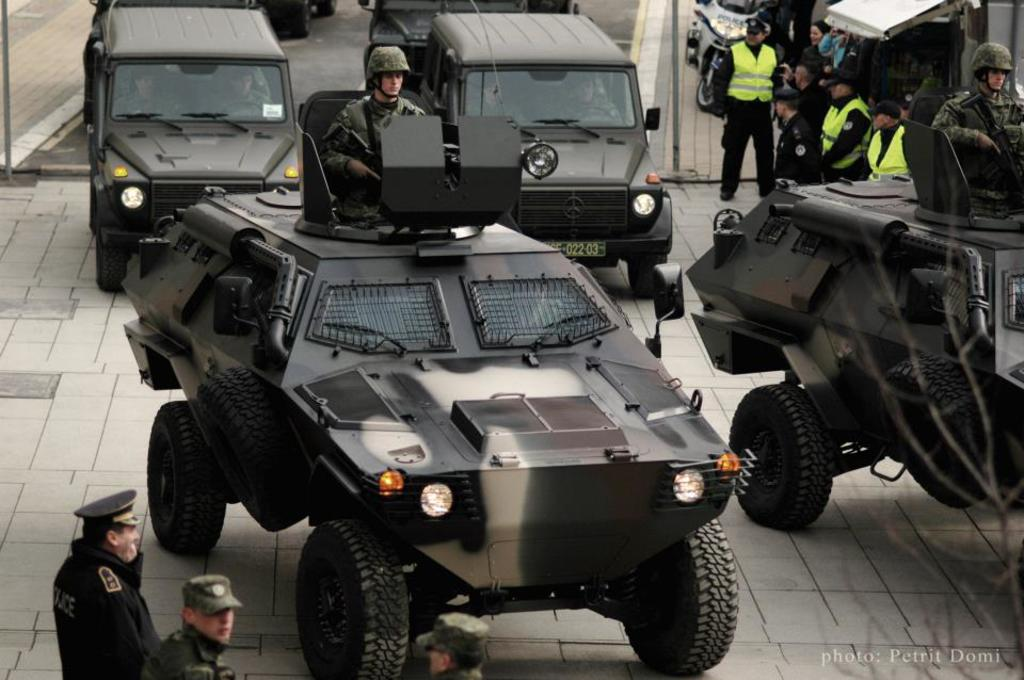
Vetëvendosje's government has significantly increased military spending. They consider Kosovo's ability to defend itself as vital to the country's interests

Vetëvendosje sees Kosovo's ability to defend itself as vital to the country's interests, despite the presence of international peacekeepers in the country. Its government quadrupled annual military spending in 2023, compared to the year in which the party took power. The party has entertained the idea of introducing mandatory military conscription in Kosovo, based on EU and NATO standards. The party seeks to join NATO's Partnership for Peace and eventually the alliance itself.

Vetëvendosje wants Kosovo to cooperate with all countries based on the principle of reciprocity. Vetëvendosje's government's insistence on reciprocity has even led to clashes in North Kosovo and to frictions with Kosovo's international partners, after its government decided to enforce the use of Kosovo's vehicle registration plates in the north of the country.

On the issue of ethnic minorities, Vetëvendosje supports the cooperation between all ethnic groups in Kosovo. Its government coalition contains almost all minority MPs, except the Serb List, which Vetëvendosje considers a tool of Serbia's president Aleksandar Vučić to destabilize Kosovo. Instead, the Vetëvendosje government wants to cooperate with Kosovo Serbs who recognize the independence of Kosovo. Following the mass resignation of members of the Kosovo Government by the Serb List, Vetëvendosje's Kurti appointed Nenad Rašić as Minister for Communities and Returns.

Vetëvendosje has been described as a nationalist party, and they want to amend Kosovo's constitution to remove the third article, which forbids the unification of Kosovo with other countries. According to the leader of Vetëvendosje, Albin Kurti, Kosovo should be allowed to unify with Albania if the people express this will through a referendum.

== Chairman of Vetëvendosje ==
#	Chairman	Born–Died	Term start	Term end	Time in office
1	Albin Kurti	1975–	12 June 2005	28 February 2015	9 years, 261 days
2	Visar Ymeri	1973–	1 March 2015	2 January 2018	2 years, 307 days
(1)	Albin Kurti	1975–	21 January 2018	Incumbent	8 years, 294 days

== Elections ==
=== Parliamentary elections ===
After five years of participating in Kosovo's political scene through protests and demonstrations, Vetëvendosje took the decision to participate in the 2010 Kosovan parliamentary election in its fifth anniversary as a political movement. After the decision was taken, Albin Kurti got arrested by EULEX in relation to the 10 February 2007 protest. Kurti would go on and get sentenced to 9 months in prison, but given that he had already spent 5 months in custody and another 5 in house arrest for the same case, he got released.

==== 2010 parliamentary elections ====
In December 2010, Vetëvendosje participated in the national elections of 2010 in coalition with LB and obtained 12.66% of the votes, which translated to 14 seats at the parliament. Local and international observers detected many irregularities, including a participation rate of 95% certain municipalities, which were strongholds of the PDK. Vetëvendosje and LDK contested the election results in three voting centers and the elections got repeated in three municipalities, leading to a slight increase in the vote share of Vetëvendosje. Vetëvendosje and LB ended their coalition on 20 September 2011, after disagreements on distribution of funds. The two MPs from LB left the Vetëvendosje parliamentary group, reducing it to 12 members.

==== 2014 parliamentary elections ====
In the 2014 elections, Vetëvendosje received 13.59% (99,397 votes), remaining the third strongest political force in the Kosovo Assembly with 16 seats. Despite PDK's electoral victory, Vetëvendosje, along with the LDK-AAK-Nisma coalition, tried to thwart PDK by attempting to form a new government together. A decision by the Constitutional Court of Kosovo that deemed Isa Mustafa's election as Chairman of the Assembly of Kosovo unconstitutional, led to the breakup of the LDK-AAK-Nisma coalition and LDK joining a coalition with PDK, in which Isa Mustafa assumed the position of prime minister. This led to Vetëvendosje taking the role of leader of the opposition, with AAK and NISMA being part of it. The Vetëvendosje-led opposition was very aggressive, opposing the border demarcation between Kosovo and Montenegro and the formation of the Association of Serb Municipalities. LDK was accused of betraying the opposition and keeping PDK in power. The opposition organized massive demonstrations on the streets, and it used tear-gas to block meetings of the parliament.

==== 2017 parliamentary elections ====
In the 2017 elections, Vetëvendosje received 27.49% (200,132 votes) making it the biggest political party in the Kosovo Assembly with 32 seats. In comparison to the 2014 elections, Vetëvendosje doubled in size. Despite being the biggest individual party and parliamentary group, Vetëvendosje remained behind the PANA coalition and remained in opposition. In 2018, 12 MPs left Vetëvendosje and created the Group of the Independent Deputies, which would later join the Social Democratic Party of Kosovo (PSD). In addition, Vetëvendosje MP Donika Kadaj-Bujupi rejoined AAK. This split reduced the Vetëvendosje parliamentary group to 19 seats.

==== 2019 parliamentary elections ====
In the early elections of 2019 which were called due to the resignation of Prime Minister at the time Ramush Haradinaj, Vetëvendosje received 26.27% (221,001 votes), remaining the biggest political party in the Kosovo Assembly with 29 seats, despite its split one year prior to the elections. Its total number of votes increased by over 10% relative to the previous election, but due to a higher participation rate, it received a smaller share of seats in the assembly. Vetëvendosje formed a coalition with LDK in February 2020 after months of negotiations, with Albin Kurti becoming prime minister of Kosovo. After a disagreement about the handling of the COVID-19 pandemic, Kurti sacked the LDK minister Agim Veliu. In retaliation, LDK initiated a motion of no confidence against the Kurti government, which passed at the parliament and the Kurti government was overthrown. Apart from Veliu's sacking, LDK blamed Vetëvendosje for ruining Kosovo's relations with the US, after Kurti exchanged skirmishes with the US envoy for the Kosovo-Serbia dialogue, Richard Grenell. Vetëvendosje remained in opposition and Kurti with the former government ministers from Vetëvendosje could not return to the parliament because they had resigned before taking executive roles, leaving them out of Kosovo's institutional life until the next election.

==== 2021 parliamentary elections ====
Results of the 2021 Kosovan parliamentary election

After the fall of the Kurti government, LDK, together with AAK, NISMA, the Serb List, and other minorities, formed a new government on 3 June 2020. The government was elected with 61 votes, which was the critical minimum required to form a government. In December 2020, the Constitutional Court deemed the LDK-led government illegal, because one of the 61 MPs that voted for it had been convicted for corruption, meaning that he had lost his valid mandate before voting for the government. This led to new elections, which were held on 14 February 2021. Vetëvendosje ran together with Guxo. Because of a conviction for setting off tear gas, Albin Kurti was not allowed to run for a seat at the parliament. Vetëvendosje won the elections and experienced a significant increase in its vote share, receiving 50.28% of the total votes. The common list of VV and Guxo gained 58 seats, with 51 for VV and 7 for Guxo. As two elected members of Guxo joined the government and Osmani was elected President, three of the Guxo seats went to the following names on the elected list, increasing VV number to 53. In April 2021, Adelina Grainca, former PDK deputy joined Vetëvendosje, increasing its number of MPs to 54.

==== Parliamentary election results ====
Year	Votes	%	Overall seats won	Albanian seats	Position	+/–	Government
2010	88,652	12.69%	14 / 120	14 / 100	▲3rd	▲14	Opposition
2014	99,397	13.59%	16 / 120	16 / 100	3rd	▲2	Opposition
2017	200,135	27.49%	32 / 120	32 / 100	▲2nd	▲16	Opposition
2019	221,001	26.27%	29 / 120	29 / 100	▲1st	▼3	Coalition (2019–2020)
2019	221,001	26.27%	29 / 120	29 / 100	▲1st	▼3	Opposition (2020–2021)
2021 (Note: Of the 58 seats won by the LVV-led coalition, 7 went to Guxo and 1 to Alternativa)	438,335	50.28%	58 / 120	58 / 100	1st	▲29	Coalition
Feb 2025 (Note: Of the 48 seats won by the LVV-led coalition, 6 went to Guxo and 1 to Alternativa)	396,787	42.30%	48 / 120	48 / 100	1st	▼10	Snap election
Dec 2025 (Note: Of the 57 seats won by the LVV-led coalition, 7 went to Guxo and 1 to Alternativa)	487,077	51.10%	57 / 120	57 / 100	1st	▲9	Coalition
2026 (Note: Of the 53 seats won by the LVV-led coalition, 3 went to Guxo and 1 to Alternativa)	382,869	47.13%	53 / 120	53 / 100	1st	▼4	Coalition

=== Local elections ===
==== 2013 local elections ====
Vetëvendosje participated in the 2013 local elections, which marked Vetëvendosje's first ever participation in local elections. Shpend Ahmeti from Vetëvendosje won the elections in the capital Pristina over LDK leader and former mayor Isa Mustafa. Until then, Pristina was considered a LDK stronghold. Vetëvendosje managed to gain local assembly seats in most of Kosovo's municipalities, but it did not win any other mayoral race. Vetëvendosje failed to win local assembly seats in the following municipalities: Dragash, Leposavić, Zvečan, Zubin Potok, Novo Brdo, Gračanica, Mamusha, Parteš, Klokot, and North Mitrovica. Overall, Vetëvendosje came fourth with a decrease in votes in comparison to the 2010 parliamentary election. A session of the party's General Council was called on December 15, 2013 which between other things discussed these results as well as necessary action in response to them. According to Shpend Ahmeti's words during an interview with Top Channel, there were also changes in the statute of Vetëvendosje, which came out of the General Council meeting.

==== 2017 local elections ====
In the 2017 local elections, Vetëvendosje won in three municipalities. Vetëvendosje won a second term in Pristina with Shpend Ahmeti and also won in Prizren with Mytaher Haskuka and in Kamenica with Qendron Kastrati. Prior to Vetëvendosje's victory, Prizren was ruled by PDK for 18 years and was called PDK's 'Jerusalem'. Shpend Ahmeti and Qendron Kastrati left Vetëvendosje in early 2018 after the split of the movement. In the summer of 2019, Agim Bahtiri, mayor of Mitrovica joined Vetëvendosje. After the resignation of mayor Agim Veliu, an extraordinary election was held in Podujevë on 29 November 2020. Vetëvendosje's Shpejtim Bulliqi won the election and is now the mayor of Podujeva until the regular 2021 election.

==== 2021 local elections ====
Vetëvendosje participated in the 2021 local elections and won 4 municipalities and 193 municipal council positions.

After the resignation of four mayors in the north of Kosovo and the subsequent boycott by the Serb local majority, Vetëvendoje won the 2023 elections in Leposavić and North Mitrovica, with a turnout of 1.06% and 4.62%, respectively. The election result was recognized by the US and other Western countries, but groups of local Serbs refused to allow the newly-elected mayors to enter their offices. Kosovo government's decision to deploy the Special Operations Unit of the Kosovo Police to the northern municipalities to enable the mayors to enter their offices led to international backlash and a clash between Kosovo and some of its Western partners. The EU introduced some measures against the government of Kosovo.

== Controversies ==
=== Controversial political activities ===
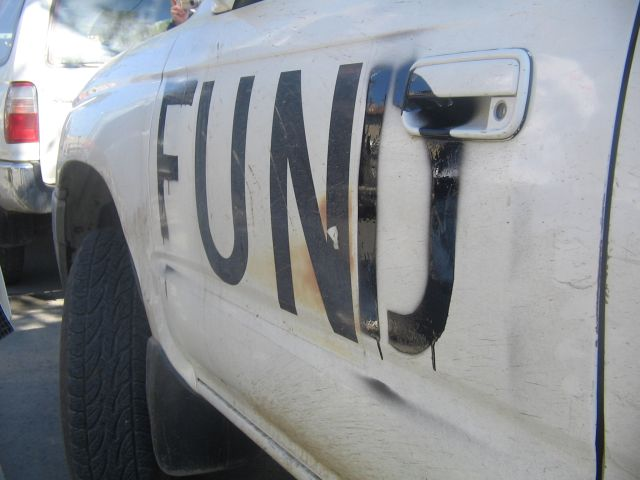
FUND – Albanian for 'End', written on a vehicle of UNMIK

Over time, Vetëvendosje has engaged in multiple controversial activities, such as "naming and shaming" of political leaders, damaging property belonging to UNMIK (and later EULEX), campaigning against the consumption of goods imported from Serbia and actively hijacking and demolishing trucks coming from Serbia, throwing paint at politicians, and other similar violent measures. In 2007, Vetëvendosje activists threw rotten eggs at Boris Tadić, the president of Serbia, when he visited Kosovo. They also poured red paint on the streets leading to the presidential residence of Kosovo when Martti Ahtisaari visited Kosovo, as a symbol for the blood spilled in the Kosovo war, which, according to Vetëvendosje, Ahtisaari was walking over with his plan for Kosovo's monitored independence.

In an August 2009 protest that turned violent, Vetëvendosje activists overturned and damaged 28 EULEX vehicles. In March 2016, activists of Vetëvendosje overturned two trucks carrying Serbian goods in a protest against the Serbian decision not to accept Kosovo Albanian schoolbooks in the Albanian-inhabited Preševo Valley in southern Serbia.

Similar activities continued to take place even within Kosovo's institutions, with Vetëvendosje members of parliament releasing tear gas inside the parliament chamber to prevent legislation from going through when the ruling parties had the required majority to pass the legislation. Parallel to this, Vetëvendosje, in cooperation with the Alliance for the Future of Kosovo and the Social Democratic Initiative had organized some of the largest protests in Kosovo's post-independence history in front of the parliament, to exert pressure on the governing parties' MPs and prevent them from passing the legislation.

When accused that their actions were extreme, Vetëvendosje leaders claimed that what they did was "radical," but not "extreme," and that throwing eggs at politicians only looked violent because the general situation in Kosovo was calm.

=== Madeleine Albright controversy ===
On 10 December 2012, US Ambassador Tracey Ann Jacobson accused Vetëvendosje of having sent a threatening letter to former State Secretary Madeleine Albright. Vetëvendosje officially replied four days later, stating that "they were amazed with the accusations, and Kurti never sent any letter to Mrs. Albright, but if someone had proof should make it available to the public". They explained that they had urged citizens of Kosovo to mail to companies which were racing for the privatization of PTK while explaining to them the harm that the privatization was causing the country's economy and the wrong practices applied during the process. Apparently, one of the runners was a consortium of Portugal Telecom with Albright Capital Management, which dropped out of the race in January 2013.

"We did not threaten anyone and we definitely did not, as you claim, try to deter Ms. Albright from visiting Kosovo. Indeed, after this letter of September 1, Ms. Albright visited Kosovo in November, without the slightest opposition from VETËVENDOSJE! During her visit, she even met our deputies."

=== 2013 protest controversy ===
On 27 June 2013, the movement organized a protest against the ratification of the agreement between Prime Minister of Kosovo Hashim Thaçi and Prime Minister of Serbia Ivica Dačić during the latest round of political negotiations between Pristina and Belgrade in Brussels hosted by Catherine Ashton. Vetëvendosje tried to block all entrances to the parliament building, in order to hinder the assembly members from entering, thus preventing the agreement for being ratified. The protest didn't succeed, and the agreement was voted from the majority of the assembly representatives. During the protest, U.S. ambassador Tracey Ann Jacobson resulted with an injury on her right arm while entering from a secondary entrance together with some assembly members. Although the video evidence showed no physical contact between protesters and ambassador, confirmed as well by LDK assemblyman Haki Demolli who entered the building together with the ambassador, the incident aggravated the already difficult relationship between the U.S. State Department and Vetëvendosje. The reaction was prompt, following the US embassy official statement, Vetëvendosje was criticized by Kosovo government instances, political factors, as well as public opinion. Even long-time supporter of Vetëvendosje, former OSCE ambassador William G. Walker, described the action as a "big mistake". According to Zëri newspaper, the U.S. State Department called Kosovo's ambassador Akan Ismajli in Washington, D.C., requiring official explanations, though no comments came from official sources within Kosovo.

"As we have stressed with all leaders and particularly to Vetëvendosje, while the United States respects citizens' rights to free speech and expression, we deplore the use of violent tactics in obstructing the democratic process. Freedom of speech does not mean the right to restrict the freedom of movement of others. Vetëvendosje's continued reliance on violent tactics undermines Kosovo's reputation as an emerging democracy."

The reaction from Vetëvendosje was vague, with soon-to-be-gone Alma Lama being the first one to personally apologize to the U.S. ambassador. On 1 July 2013, Glauk Konjufca apologized to all foreign representatives visiting the Kosovo parliament on that day: "It was precisely the case of the American ambassador, but also of any other ambassador who, if they experienced any unpleasant situation, we apologize to them. But, analyzing the damage of the agreement, it seemed reasonable to us to act in that way and I am not saying that there were no mistakes." The overall positioning of Vetëvendosje was described by Shpend Ahmeti statement: "The protest was not violent, we didn't want anyone to get hurt, we are sorry if someone actually did, but the negative effects of the agreement overrun any side effects of the protest", adding "the government is trying to show us as anti-American, which we are not".

The deputy assistant of Secretary of State in the Bureau of European and Eurasian Affairs Philip Reeker, during his visit to Pristina a few days later, was harsh and very direct with Vetëvendosje, calling them "clowns who want to be violent". Vetëvendosje responded by calling Reekers' accusations as "unfair and non-democratic" and issuing a letter of complaint to the U.S. Department of State.

=== Expansion to other countries ===
Vetëvendosje has tried to expand to other neighboring countries too. It was accused for interfering in internal politics of Albania and North Macedonia by having its members endorse candidates for MPs in the parliaments of those countries, directly supporting candidates running in elections, and by having its own members with dual citizenship running in elections and using their connection to Vetëvendosje to gather support. In the 2021 Albanian parliamentary election, Vetëvendosje's center in Albania, which functions as a nonprofit organization there, supported three independent candidates that were running in elections. Neither of those managed to get elected.

Something similar happened in the 2024 North Macedonian parliamentary election, with Vetëvendosje leader Albin Kurti being a major reason for the formation of the VLEN Coalition, which played a key role in the election of Hristijan Mickoski as the Prime Minister of North Macedonia. The interference, which had the goal of sidelining the Albanian Democratic Union for Integration had the unintended consequence of taking Vetëvendosje's partner Social Democratic Union of Macedonia into opposition. Three of Vetëvendosje's own members ran for MPs inside the VLEN Coalition and one of them, Bekim Qoku, managed to get elected into the Assembly of North Macedonia.

In a similar fashion, Vetëvendosje has endorsed Joe Biden for president of the United States in the 2020 United States elections, the Social Democratic Party of Germany of Olaf Scholz in the 2021 German federal election, and the Social Democratic Party of Switzerland in the 2023 Swiss federal election, by calling on the Albanian diaspora in those countries to vote for its endorsed candidates.

These actions by Vetëvendosje have been criticized by diplomats who see these actions as dangerous for the interaction between the Government of Kosovo with foreign governments, especially when the endorsed candidates do not get elected. The tense relations between Kosovo Prime Minister Albin Kurti and the Prime Minister of Albania Edi Rama have sometimes been attributed to Vetëvendosje's support for Rama's rivals in the Albanian election of 2021.

=== Other controversies ===
Vetëvendosje activists and politicians have often ignored and contested the symbols of the Republic of Kosovo, including the flag and anthem. Visar Ymeri, chairman of Vetëvendosje at the time, refused to stand up for the anthem when participating in a congress of the AKR in 2017. When asked about it, Ymeri said that he confused it for a melody of Beethoven. In an interview before the 2019 parliamentary elections, Albin Kurti, chairman of Vetëvendosje, said that "Of course that I will respect (the symbols of Kosovo) as Prime Minister. But keep in mind that I am chairman of Vetëvendosje and I also represent those values that are important to us. The (Albanian) anthem is not just Albania's, it belongs to all Albanians. As Albanians, we have many things in common, including the (Albanian) flag, history, and so on. The flag of Kosovo has no history and no value other than its geographical value. We know that (adopting this flag) was a mistake, but now we have no choice but to accept it."

=== Sanctions by the European Union ===
In 2023 the European Union announced sanctions on Kosovo for what the bloc said was Albin Kurti government role in stoking ethnic tensions in northern Kosovo, which has a Serb majority, including restrictions on funding and participation.

== See also ==
- Politics of Kosovo
- Unification of Albania and Kosovo
- Albanian nationalism
