= Mimoza Kusari-Lila =

Kosovo politician

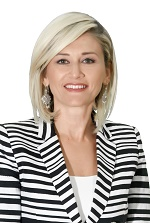
- Kusari-Lila in 2017

Minister of Industry, Entrepreneurship and Trade
- Incumbent
- Assumed office 11 February 2026
- President: Vjosa Osmani; Albulena Haxhiu (acting)
- Preceded by: Rozeta Hajdari
- In office 23 February 2011 – 2 October 2013
- President: Atifete Jahjaga
- Preceded by: Lutfi Zharku
- Succeeded by: Bernard Nikaj

Leader of Alternativa
- Incumbent
- Assumed office 8 February 2017
- Preceded by: New office

Mayor of Gjakova
- In office January 2014 – July 2017
- Deputy: Ramadan Hoti
- Preceded by: Pal Lekaj
- Succeeded by: Ardian Gjini

Personal details
- Born: Mimoza Kusari; 16 October 1975 (age 50) Gjakova, SFR Yugoslavia (now Kosovo)
- Party: New Kosovo Alliance (2009–2016); Alternativa (2017–present)
- Spouse: Arben Lila
- Children: 2
- Education: University of Prishtina; University of Colorado; Duquesne University (MBA)
- Known for: Deputy Prime Minister of Kosovo; First women mayor in Gjakova

Mimoza Kusari-Lila (born 16 October 1975) is a Kosovar politician for The Alternative (Albanian: Alternativa). She was the deputy prime minister of the Republic of Kosovo and minister of trade and industry from 2011 to 2013 and the mayor of Gjakova from November 2013 to 2017.

== Family ==
Mimoza Kusari was born on 16 October 1975 in Gjakova. Her father is a pulmonologist and her mother is a teacher of Albanian language and literature in elementary school. Her family lived for a short time in Peja. They returned to Gjakova with their four children in the mid-1980s.

== Education ==
Kusari finished high school at the Hajdar Dushi Gymnasium and then registered in the University of Prishtina, Faculty of Economics. She graduated in management and informations systems, working full-time to fund her studies in a time of economic crisis and political repression. In 1998-1999, when the Kosovo war broke out, she worked for organizations such as Doctors Without Borders and the Organization for Security and Cooperation in Europe (OSCE).

During the Kosovo war, while working in a refugee camp for the American National Public Radio service in the Republic of Macedonia, she won the Ron Brown Scholarship from the United States Department of State to pursue an MBA in the United States.

During her stay in the US, she continued studies at the Institute of Economics, University of Colorado, and Duquesne University in Pittsburgh, Pennsylvania, where she completed her master's in e-business. During this time she was very active in organizing the student community and showing leadership skills. She founded and was the first president of the Association of Business Women of Duquesne University and was one of three Ron Brown scholarship holders from Eastern Europe invited to participate in the celebration of International Education Week by Secretary of State Madelaine Albright in Washington, D.C. After her studies, she worked as an intern at Bayer Corporation of North America in Pittsburgh in the department of e-sales.

After returning to Kosovo in 2001, she worked for the World Bank and USAID project to support Kosovar businesses. Her leadership and managerial skills were tested while she worked as project manager at the American University in Kosovo Foundation education plan for Kosovo and the establishment of the institution. Her work resulted in the successful opening of the university, now as a leading education institution in Kosovo and the region.

== Political activity ==
Kusari was exposed to politics and public service in 2003 when she was offered the position of spokesperson and political adviser to then prime minister of Kosovo, Bajram Rexhepi. The first woman to have such a position and impartial in her political beliefs, she was the face and voice of the Kosovo government for more than a year at a time when Kosovo returned to the March 2004 riots. She announced a break from politics at the end of 2004, with her marriage with Arben Lila, and her son being born in the following year. Kusari added her husband's last name to her own and now uses Kusari Lila as her official name.

She restarted political activity as director of the department of energy in the ministry of energy and mines, ad then in the American chamber of commerce in Kosovo, where she as an executive director in 2006-2009. While in the American chamber in Kosovo, in 2009, she finished a four-month research project as the Fulbright Scholarship at Georgetown University, capital research center in Washington, D.C., focusing on the development of capital markets in the developing world. During her stay, she was invited as a guest speaker to the Woodrow Wilson International Center for Scholars event to introduce substantial development challenges in Kosovo.

In 2009, Kusari Lila made official her candidacy for mayor of Gjakova within the party New Kosovo Alliance (AKR). She was named deputy prime minister of Kosovo and minister of commerce and industry on 23 February 2011, and worked in this capacity until 2 October 2013, when she resigned from all positions in the government of Kosovo because of her commitment to an election campaign for mayor of Gjakova for the second time, this time winning in the second round. She became the first woman mayor in history of Kosovo.

== See also ==
- 2013 Kosovan local elections
- List of political parties in Kosovo
