= Dardan Gashi =

Kosovan politician

Dardan Gashi is a Kosovar politician and author and was Deputy Prime Minister of Kosovo / Minister of the Ministry of Diaspora and Strategic Investments in the cabinet of Ramush Haradinaj from September 2017 to February 2020.

== Biography ==
Born in Kosovo, Gashi moved to Austria where he studied Communication Sciences and Political Sciences in the University of Vienna. After completing his degree, he went on to begin his career as an election supervisor with the Organization for Security and Co-operation in Europe (OSCE) Mission in Bosnia and Herzegovina. In 1997, he became the Election Officer, Head of Field Office in Brcko Federation. Later that year, he moved to Croatia, in the capacity of Human Rights Monitor, and spent the next year in various posts as part of OSCE missions in the Balkans.

During the Kosovo War, Gashi worked with the Kosovo Verification Mission as a Public Information Liaison Officer, OSCE Secretariat in Vienna. After the war, he resumed his work with OSCE, and contributed to plans for institution-building, media policy and elections and registration. From 2011 until 2014, he was Minister for Environment and Planning.

In 2000, he contributed to the International Crisis Group, United Nations Criminal Tribunal for the Former Yugoslavia (ICTY), European Stability Initiative, etc.

From 2005 to 2008, Gashi worked at the office of the Deputy Prime Minister/Ministry of Local Government Administration in Kosovo. Initially, he chaired the working group on decentralization, and participated as a senior adviser at all meetings during the Vienna Negotiations. Meanwhile, Gashi also chaired the WG on Return within the Direct Dialogue process with Belgrade.

In June 2010, Gashi became Deputy Minister of European Integration. He held this position until January 2011, when he was proposed to become the Minister of Environment, following the national elections of 2010. From 2011 until 2014, he was Minister for Environment and Spatial Planning.

During Dardan Gashi’s mandate, the Ministry of Environment and Spatial Planning has managed to approximate the legislation of the Republic of Kosovo with the European Union. Regarding the air pollution, MESP has forced large corporations, also known as the largest polluters (Kosovo Energy Corporation, Ferronikel, Sharrcem, etc.) to install filters to prevent further air pollution.

In November, 2011, at the request of the Minister Gashi, the Kosovo Government stopped the illegal sand and gravel exploitation in the rivers basins of Kosovo. This decision was applauded by citizens and NGOs as one of the best decisions necessary for the protection of environment. Since then, the illegal exploitation of inert materials has stalled, resulting in investments by MESP and municipalities for the reconstruction of river banks.

In the field of spatial planning, Minister Gashi, in collaboration with USAID, was committed to reforming the Law on Construction. After reforming the application process for a construction permit, Kosovo’s ranking in Doing Business Report has increased from 177 to 144, in 2012.

In addition to politics, Dardan Gashi is co-author of several books in German, including "Im Dienst des Diktators", then "Albanien: archaisch, orientalisch, europaeisch" and "Durch das Land der Hirten und Helden."

During the 1990s, Dardan Gashi worked as a journalist for "Zëri", then in the media known as "BBC", "DW", "Der Standard" and "APA", as well as Tribuna and KlanK.

In addition to politics, Gashi wrote/co-authored several books, including Im Dienst des Diktators, Albanien: archaisch, orientalisch, europaeisch, Durch das Land der Hirten und Helden, etc.
