= Isa Mustafa =

Kosovar politician

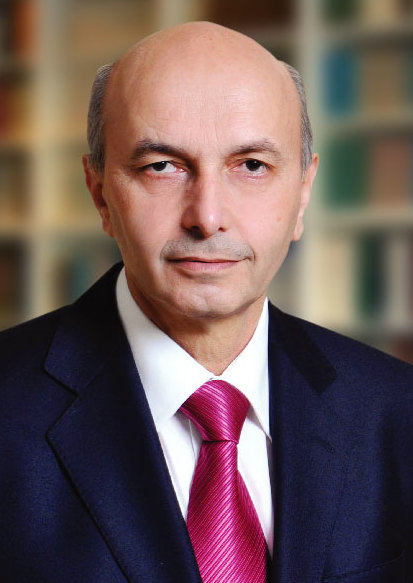

Prime Minister of Kosovo
- In office 9 December 2014 – 9 September 2017
- President: Atifete Jahjaga; Hashim Thaçi
- Deputy: Hashim Thaçi; Hajredin Kuçi; Kujtim Shala; Branimir Stojanović; Ramiz Kelmendi
- Preceded by: Hashim Thaçi
- Succeeded by: Ramush Haradinaj

Mayor of Pristina
- In office 14 December 2007 – 26 December 2013
- Preceded by: Ismet Beqiri
- Succeeded by: Shpend Ahmeti

Leader of the Democratic League
- In office 7 November 2010 – 14 March 2021
- Preceded by: Fatmir Sejdiu
- Succeeded by: Lumir Abdixhiku

Minister of Economy and Finance
- In office 1991–1999
- Prime Minister: Bujar Bukoshi
- Preceded by: Position established
- Succeeded by: Position abolished

Personal details
- Born: 15 May 1951 (age 75) Prapashticë, Pristina, AR Kosovo, FPR Yugoslavia (now Kosovo)
- Citizenship: Kosovo
- Party: Democratic League (since 1989)
- Spouse: Qevsere Mustafa
- Children: 3
- Education: University of Pristina

Isa Mustafa (Albanian: [iˈsa musˈtafa]; born 15 May 1951) is a Kosovar retired politician. Mustafa was the mayor of Pristina from December 2007 to December 2013 and served as the prime minister of Kosovo between December 2014 and September 2017. He was the leader of the Democratic League of Kosovo (LDK) between 2010 and 2021.

== Early life ==
Mustafa was born in the village of Prapashtica, in the Gollak Highlands of the District of Pristina, Kosovo, Yugoslavia, on 15 May 1951, to Kosovo Albanian parents. He and his family speak Albanian in the Gheg dialect of the language. He finished primary and high school in Pristina, and attended the University of Pristina in the Faculty of Economics, where he obtained a master's degree and a PhD. In 1974 he began his professional work, as an examiner at the University of Pristina.

== Political career ==
Isa Mustafa began his political career in the early 1980s, when he became the head of the municipal government of Pristina, from 1984 to 1988. In the 1990s, as Yugoslavia started to break up, Mustafa became the Minister of Economy and Finances of the government of the Republic of Kosova, in exile, headed by Bujar Bukoshi. During this time, an arrest warrant for Mustafa was issued within Yugoslavia – which did not become international, making it possible for him to work in Western Europe. Mustafa did not apply for any political asylum, and was able to return to Kosovo anytime if needed.

After the Kosovo War ended on 1999, he returned home, but returned to politics only in 2006 as a High Political Advisor of the then President of Kosovo, Fatmir Sejdiu.

In December 2007, he became the mayor of Pristina in local elections, beating the vice president of the Democratic Party of Kosovo (PDK) and one of the ex-commanders of the Kosovo Liberation Army (UÇK), Fatmir Limaj. He won a second term as Mayor of Pristina in November 2009.

On 7 November 2010, he became the leader of the Democratic League of Kosovo, beating Fatmir Sejdiu in the party leadership election by 235 votes to 124.

On 1 December 2013, he lost re-election to the position of Mayor of Pristina, in what was seen as a major upset, to upcoming politician Shpend Ahmeti. The upset was especially dramatic seeing as it happened in what had been historically known as a Democratic League of Kosovo stronghold.

On 8 December 2014, he became the Prime Minister of Kosovo in a coalition with the Democratic Party of Kosovo. With a PhD in Economics, he claimed his government would be focused on the economic development of the country.

While addressing the Assembly of Kosovo on 22 September 2015 regarding an agreement with Serbia on autonomy for Kosovo's ethnic Serb minority and another agreement defining the border between Kosovo and Montenegro, Mustafa was pelted with eggs by opposition Assembly lawmakers. He later continued his address while being shielded with an umbrella by his bodyguards.

On 10 May 2017, Mustafa lost a vote of no-confidence and decided not to stand in the next election. Instead he nominated Avdullah Hoti as the Democratic League candidate for prime minister. Mustafa stayed on as Prime Minister until his successor Ramush Haradinaj was elected by parliament in September 2017 following a parliamentary election.

In January 2018, Isa Mustafa was diagnosed with Guillain-Barré Syndrome. After being diagnosed in Kosovo, he began treatment in at a hospital in Pforzheim, Germany, and his health condition improved.

On 3 August 2019, Isa Mustafa was re-elected as leader of the Democratic League of Kosovo for the third time.

On 10 July 2020, Mustafa announced on his Facebook page that he was diagnosed with COVID-19. On 1 August 2020, he revealed on his Facebook page that he had fully recovered from the disease.

On 15 February 2021, Mustafa announced he would be standing down as the leader of the Democratic League of Kosovo after a poor result in the 2021 elections. He officially resigned at the LDK convention on 14 March 2021, and was succeeded by Lumir Abdixhiku, who named Mustafa as the honorary president of LDK the same day.

== Personal life ==
Mustafa is married to Qevsere Mustafa and has two sons and a daughter. He has also stated himself to be a Muslim who has fasted for Ramadan.

Political offices
New office	Minister of Economy and Finances; 1991–1999	Position abolished
Preceded by Ismet Beqiri	Mayor of Pristina; 2007–2013	Succeeded by Shpend Ahmeti
Preceded by Hashim Thaçi	Prime Minister of Kosovo; 2014–2017	Succeeded by Ramush Haradinaj
Party political offices
Preceded by Fatmir Sejdiu	Leader of the Democratic League; 2010–2021	Succeeded by Lumir Abdixhiku
