= Social Democratic Initiative (Kosovo) =

Social Democratic Initiative Nisma Socialdemokrate
- Leader: Fatmir Limaj
- Secretary: Bilall Sherifi
- Founded: 28 February 2014
- Split from: Democratic Party
- Headquarters: Pristina
- Ideology: Social democracy Pro-Europeanism
- Political position: Centre-left
- National affiliation: AAK–NISMA
- Colours: Orange, white, purple
- Assembly: 0 / 120
- Mayors: 1 / 38
- Municipal councils: 24 / 994

Website
- http://www.nisma.info

The Social Democratic Initiative (Albanian: Nisma Socialdemokrate) also known as NISMA, is a political party in Kosovo formed by Fatmir Limaj and Jakup Krasniqi, former members of the Democratic Party of Kosovo (PDK).

Limaj is party leader. Secretary Jakup Krasniqi's involvement in the Pronto Affair wiretapping scandal was the culmination of a split of PDK. Sami Lushtaku (mayor of Skenderaj and PDK leader) together with Prime Minister of Kosovo Hashim Thaçi and Adem Grabovci, had insulted the Chairman of the Assembly of Kosovo Jakup Krasniqi and offended citizens of Malishevë, referring to them as dog walkers.

== History ==
In the 2013 Kosovan local elections Limaj abandoned PDK to support the Civic Initiative for Malishevo (Albanian: Iniciativa Qytetare për Malishevën) and (winning) mayoral candidate Ragip Begaj, ending 15 years of PDK government. Kosovo Liberation Army leader and PDK co-founder left the party with Jakup Krasniqi Chairman of the Assembly of Kosovo. Jakup Krasniqi was elected secretary of the national council of the party.

On 29 January 2018, the party convention decided to change the name of their party from Initiative for Kosovo (Nisma për Kosovën), to the Social Democratic Initiative (Nisma Socialdemokrate).

== Election results ==
| Year | Votes | % | Overall seats won | Albanian seats | Position | +/– | Coalition | Government | Leader |
|---|---|---|---|---|---|---|---|---|---|
| 2014 | 37,681 | 5.15% | 6 / 120 | 6 / 100 | 6th | ▲6 | — | Opposition | Fatmir Limaj |
| 2017 | 245,646 | 33.74% | 6 / 120 | 6 / 100 | ▲1st | 6 | PANA | Coalition | Fatmir Limaj |
| 2019 | 42,083 | 5% | 4 / 120 | 4 / 100 | ▼5th | ▼2 | NISMA-AKR-PD | Opposition (2019-2020) | Fatmir Limaj |
| 2019 | 42,083 | 5% | 4 / 120 | 4 / 100 | ▼5th | ▼2 | NISMA-AKR-PD | Coalition (2020-2021) | Fatmir Limaj |
| 2021 | 21,997 | 2.52% | 0 / 120 | 0 / 100 | ▼6th | ▼4 | — | Extra-parliamentary | Fatmir Limaj |
| Feb 2025 | 62,588 | 7.46% | 3 / 120 | 3 / 100 | ▲4th | ▲3 | AAK-NISMA | Snap election | Fatmir Limaj |
| Dec 2025 | 15,189 | 1.59% | 0 / 120 | 0 / 120 | ▼6th | ▼2 | — | Extra-parliamentary | Fatmir Limaj |
