= 2025 Pristina municipal election =

- Mayoral election
- 12 October 2025 (first round); 9 November 2025 (second round)
- Turnout: 48.12% (first round) ▲3.12; 41.11% (second round) ▼1.39
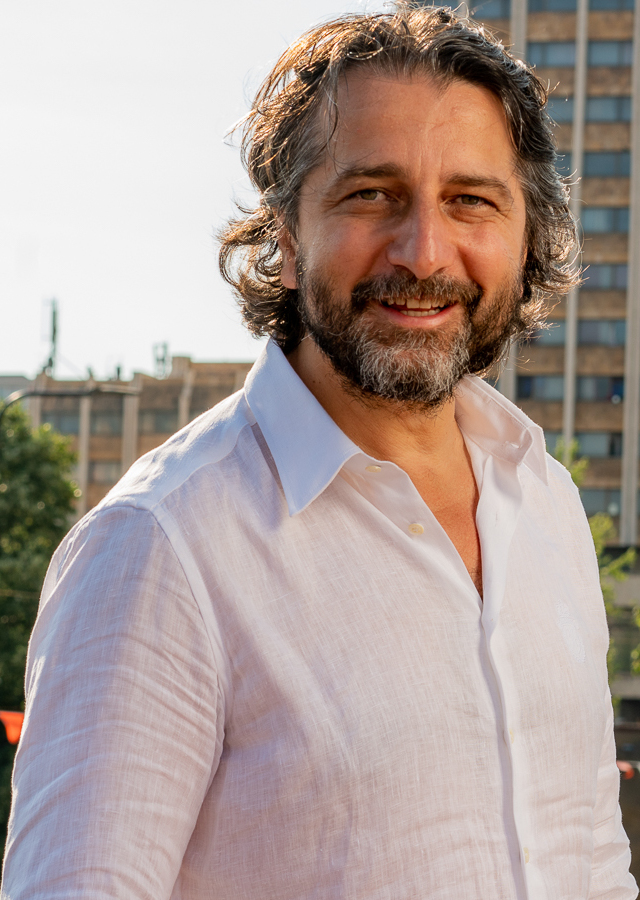

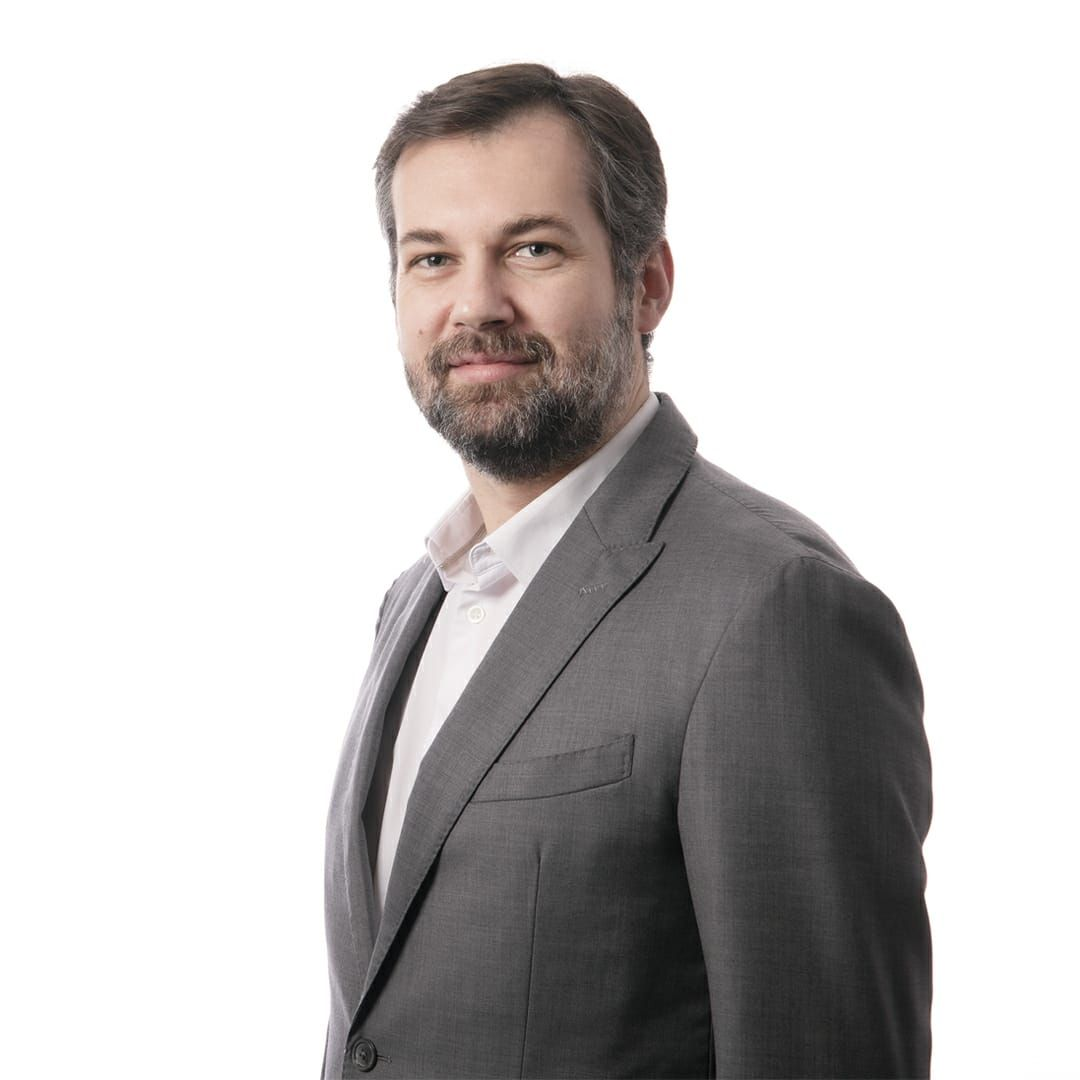
Candidate	Përparim Rama	Hajrulla Çeku
Party	LDK	LVV
Popular vote	47,303	44,712
Percentage	51.41%	48.59%
Mayor before election
Përparim Rama
LDK
Elected Mayor
Përparim Rama
LDK
- Municipal Assembly election
- 12 October 2025
- All 51 seats in the Municipal Assembly; 26 seats needed for a majority
Party	Leader	Vote %	Seats	+/–
LDK	Përparim Rama	29.19%	15	+1
PDK	Uran Ismaili	22.55%	12	+3
LVV	Mrika Limani Myrtaj	21.64%	12	−5
AAK	Bekë Berisha	10.04%	5	−1
Lidhja e Prishtinës	Fehmi Kupina	7.47%	4	+4
PSD	Besa Shahini	2.66%	1	+1
NISMA	Endrit Zabërgja	2.32%	1	0
Guxo	Jeta Statovci	2.05%	1	+1
This lists parties that won seats. See the complete results below.

Municipal elections to elect the mayor and Municipal Assembly were held in Pristina on 12 October 2025. A runoff was also held on 9 November 2025 for races where candidates did not earn more than 50% of the vote. Incumbent mayor Përparim Rama (LDK) defeated opponent Hajrulla Çeku (Vetëvendosje) for a second term.

== Background ==
Përparim Rama of the Democratic League (LDK) won the 2021 Pristina mayoral election and formed a coalition with the Democratic Party (PDK) in the municipal assembly. However in early 2024 the coalition was broken due to disagreements over swapping properties between two of Pristina's districts. Rama quickly created a coalition with the Alliance for the Future of Kosovo (AAK). However this coalition proved ineffective as the assembly regularly struggled to pass laws and budgets.

== Electoral system ==
The Mayor and the members of the Assembly will be elected by open-list proportional representation. In the mayoral race if no candidate managed to gain more than 50% of the vote then a second round is held between the top two candidates.

== Campaign ==
LDK nominated incumbent mayor Përparim Rama for a second term. Rama announced the slogan for the campaign would be "Prishtina që duam" (Pristina that we want) and stated that his priorities would be to finish his projects that have been blocked by the central government.

Vetëvendosje (LVV) proposed Minister of Culture Hajrulla Çeku for mayor. During his term as Minister Çeku has stopped or postponed several projects of Rama due to alleged legal issues surrounding them. The stopped project estimated value is 30 million.

PDK nominated former Minister of Health Uran Ismaili. He is running under the slogan "Koha për Prishtinën" (its time for Pristina) and has pledged to make the city for functional, clean and livable.

AAK has proposed deputy Bekë Berisha for mayor. He is largely known for his interesting campaign in the February 2025 parliamentary election. Berisha has stated that his priorities are traffic, waste management, school safety, and public safety.

The Social Democratic Party of Kosovo (PSD) has nominated Besa Shahini, former Albanian Minister of Education and wife of PSD Party leader Dardan Molliqaj. Currently she is the only woman in the race. Shahini has said that her priority will be education in the capital, connections between neighborhoods and greenspaces.

== Results ==
=== Prishtina ===
On 8 September, Nedime Belegu withdrew from the race due to health reasons, even though she had been certified by the Central Election Commission.

Mayoral results
Candidate	Party	First round		Second round	
Candidate	Party	Votes	%	Votes	%
Përparim Rama (incumbent)	Democratic League of Kosovo	35,595	33.71	47,303	51.41
Hajrulla Çeku	Levizja Vetëvendosje!	35,077	33.21	44,712	48.59
Uran Ismajli	Democratic Party of Kosovo	29,203	27.65		
Bekë Berisha	Alliance for the Future of Kosovo	3,298	3.12		
Besa Shahini	Social Democratic Party of Kosovo	1,652	1.56		
Fatmir Selimi	Independent	256	0.24		
Merkur Beqiri	Alternativa	199	0.19		
Agim Krasniqi	Prishtina në dorën tende	181	0.17		
Lulzim Syla	Independent	77	0.07		
~~Nedime Belegu~~ (withdrew)	~~Epoka e Hyjneshës në Prishtinë~~	69	0.07		
Total		105,607	100.00	92,015	100.00

=== Municipal Assembly ===
Party	Votes	%	+/–	Seats	+/–
Democratic League of Kosovo	29,063	29.10	+1.88	15	+1
Democratic Party of Kosovo	22,409	22.44	+4.71	12	+3
Vetëvendosje	21,853	21.88	–11.67	12	–5
Alliance for the Future of Kosovo	10,006	10.02	—0.69	5	–1
Lidhja e Prishtinës	7,433	7.44	New	4	New
Social Democratic Party of Kosovo	2,665	2.67	+2.68	1	+1
Nisma	2,303	2.31	+1.33	1	–
Guxo	2,066	2.07	New	1	New
Turkish Democratic Party	377	0.38	-0.39	0	–
Alternativa	415	0.42	New	0	New
Prishtina në dorën tende	403	0.40	New	0	New
Forca e Re Kombëtare	377	0.38	New	0	New
Epoka e Hyjneshës në Prishtinë	35	0.04	New	0	New
Independents	474	0.47	New	0	New
Total	99,879	100.00	–	51	–
Source: KQZ
