= 2021 Pristina municipal election =

Mayoral and local municipal election of Pristina 2021

- Mayoral election
- 17 October 2021 (first round); 14 November 2021 (second round)
- Turnout: 45% (first round) ▼2.4pp 42.5% (second round) ▼2.5pp
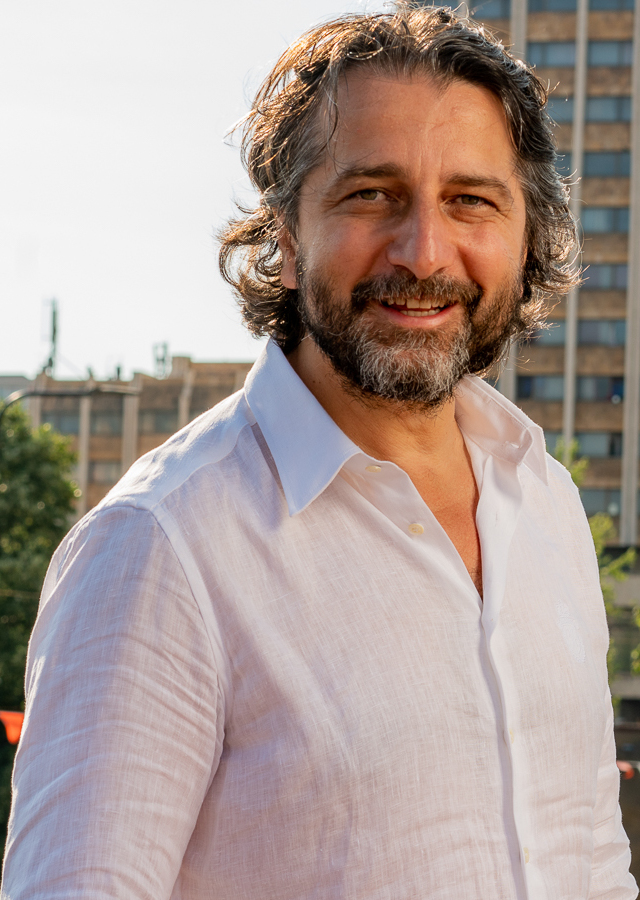

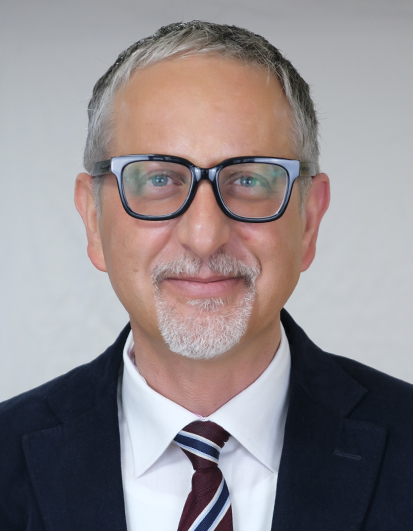
Candidate	Përparim Rama	Arben Vitia
Party	LDK	LVV
Popular vote	41,746	40,143
Percentage	50.98%	49.02%
Mayor before election
Shpend Ahmeti
PSD
Elected Mayor
Përparim Rama
LDK
- Municipal Assembly election
- 17 October 2021
- All 51 seats in the Municipal Assembly; 26 seats needed for a majority
Party	Leader	Vote %	Seats	+/–
LVV	Arben Vitia	33.56	17	0
LDK	Përparim Rama	27.22	14	−1
PDK	Uran Ismaili	17.73	9	+3
AAK	Daut Haradinaj	10.75	6	+1
AKR	Gezim Mehmeti	5.59	3	−1
LB	Florim Isufi	2.89	1	−1
NISMA		0.98	1	0
This lists parties that won seats. See the complete results below.

Municipal elections to elect the mayor and Municipal Assembly were held in Pristina on 17 October 2021, with a second round of the mayoral election on 14 November. The elections came just nine months after parliamentary elections which saw Vetëvendosje win by a landslide. Përparim Rama of the Democratic League of Kosovo won the mayoral election, narrowly defeating Vetëvendosje's Arben Vitia, the Minister of Health. by around 1,600 votes.

== Background ==
Ever since the end of the war, Pristina had been the largest voting base for the LDK party. However, in 2013 Shpend Ahmeti of Vetvendosje won the Mayoral election defeating the then-leader of LDK Isa Mustafa. In 2017 Ahmeti would win reelections. In 2018 12 out of 32 Vetvedosje's members of parliament defected to the protest party Social Democratic Party including the Mayor of Kamenica Qendron Kastrati and the Mayor of Prishtina Shpend Ahmeti. Ahmeti would also serve as leader of PSD from 2018 until 2019 when the party failed to win any seats in the legislative election.

== Electoral System ==
The Mayor and the members of the Assembly will be elected by open-list proportional representation. In the mayoral race if no candidate managed to gain more than 50% of the vote then a second round is held between the top two candidates.

== Campaign ==
Vetëvendosje proposed Arben Vitia, Minister of Health during both governments of Albin Kurti, as Mayor of Pristina. Vitia had been head of the Department of Health and Social Welfare in Prishtina under the Mayorship of Shpend Ahmeti but later was fired when the latter joined PSD. Vitia was Minister of Healthcare during the COVID-19 pandemic in Kosovo and faced criticism due to the government's harsh measures against the virus. The harshest criticism came from the Islamic community and opposition parties as the Government forbade people from going to Mosques on Eid al-Fitr day, an Islamic holiday. Opposition parties also called for his resignation at the time for a controversial strategy the government had employed in a student center where a 26-year-old had died. Vitia later received praise as Japan and Albania had begun to donate vaccines against COVID-19. On October the 1st 2021, Vitia resigned as Minister of Health to fully focus on his campaign on the mayoral election in Pristina. Despite the criticism for him, an opinion poll days after he resigned found out that roughly 50% thought that Vitia had been a good minister and he led in several polls for mayor of Pristina. Vitia's campaign on Pristina was largely centered on his record as Minister of Health and on his programs to ease traffic in the city. Vitia proposed improving public transportation by adding 160 buses to try to lower car usage, he promised to increase and fix pedestrian walkways and to extend the "Rruga A" in Pristina. Vitia promised to invest in Prishina's suburban areas and to improve its cosmetics to allow more capital movement and economic growth in those areas.

The Democratic League of Kosovo had suffered its worst defeat ever in the 2021 legislative election and its leader Isa Mustafa had resigned. Lumir Abdixhiku, former Minister of Infrastructure and Environment, had become the leader of LDK with the vision of reforming the party away from its old administration. Abdixhiku chose Përparim Rama, an Albanian-British architect who had lived in London for 30 years, as its candidate for the mayorship in Pristina. Rama was largely unknown to most of the public, apart from a controversial project to create a residential development close to Badovc Lake, which Pristhina relies on for freshwater. The plan was blocked by Minister Abdixhiku. Rama centered his campaign on what he calls Pristhina's triple P's. Prishtina Praktike, Prishtina e Pastër and Prishtina e Përjetimeve, or, Practical Pristina, Clean Pristina and the Pristina of Experiences. Practical Pristina refers to changes to the city’s infrastructure from education and health to parking problems and road safety. But the main focus is his dream to redefine Mother Theresa Square, extend it to comprise much of central Pristina, and increase pedestrian access to the site from surrounding neighborhoods. This redefinition of the city center is aimed at redefining the hierarchy of traffic, placing pedestrians first, then public transport, and cars last. Clean Pristina focuses on green mobility infrastructure, aiming to increase walking paths and accessibility for people with disabilities. It also highlights public transport connections to nearby villages and towns and includes waste management and recycling projects. Pristina of Experiences is focused on the cultural life of the city. Alongside other ideas about cultural transformation, Rama promises the city will have an orchestra, a new theater, an art gallery, and a multifunctional event hall. Rama also promised to build several schools in Prishtina and to increase the municipal child benefit law to €70 a month for poorer families.

The Democratic Party of Kosovo proposed Uran Ismaili, former Minister of Health and deputy leader of PDK, for mayor of Pristina. Ismaili had a history of criticizing then Minister of Health Arben Vitia, one time even calling for his investigation. Ismaili ran under the slogan "Pristhina na bashkon" (Pristina unites us). In his campaign, Ismaili was regularly seen around the streets of Pristina meeting with his voters and his campaign on social media also received praise. In campaign videos, he intervenes throughout the city fixing benches, installing bins, and painting sports fields, giving a teaser of the bigger changes he envisions. He was even endorsed by the Mayor of Tirana Erijon Veliaj. Ismaili finished 3rd with roughly 21% of the vote, PDK's best performance since 2007. Media analysts say that Ismaili's battle wasn't against the other candidates, but a battle to win the voters of Pristina, many of whom consider themselves against PDK due to its corrupt history.

== Opinion polls ==
=== First round ===
Pollster	Date	LVV Vitia	LDK Rama	PDK Ismaili	AAK Haradinaj	Other	Lead
UBO Consulting	Exit Poll	43.2	27.8	21.9	4.4	–	15.4
Albanian Post	Exit Poll	44.5	26.5	20.9	5.9	–	18
UBO Consulting	16 October	51.9	20	22.6	4.0	–	29.3
UBO Consulting	10 October	46.3	25.1	19.2	5.5	0.4	21.2
Pyper	1 October	46.11	14.04	17.74	4.84	–	28.37

=== Second Round ===
Pollster	Date	LVV Vitia	LDK Rama	Lead
UBO Consulting	Exit Poll	50.9	49.1	1.8
Albanian Post	Exit Poll	49	51	2

== Results ==
=== Mayor ===
Candidate	Party	First round		Second round	
Candidate	Party	Votes	%	Votes	%
Arben Vitia	Vetëvendosje	36,818	42.54	40,143	49.02
Përparim Rama	Democratic League of Kosovo	25,252	29.17	41,746	50.98
Uran Ismaili	Democratic Party of Kosovo	18,771	21.69		
Daut Haradinaj	Alliance for the Future of Kosovo	3,874	4.48		
Gëzim Mehmeti	New Kosovo Alliance	1,588	1.83		
Avni Çakmaku	Fjala	155	0.18		
Florim Isufi	Partia Balliste	100	0.12		
Total		86,558	100.00	81,889	100.00
Source: Central Election Commission

=== Municipal Assembly ===
Party	Votes	%	+/–	Seats	+/–
Vetëvendosje	26,988	33.56	+0.44	17	0
Democratic League of Kosovo	21,889	27.22	–1.12	14	–1
Democratic Party of Kosovo	14,258	17.73	+6.74	9	+3
Alliance for the Future of Kosovo	8,647	10.75	+0.74	6	+1
New Kosovo Alliance	4,497	5.59	–2.02	3	–1
Movement for Unification	2,320	2.89	–0.31	1	–1
Social Democratic Initiative	790	0.98	–1.85	1	0
Turkish Democratic Party	621	0.77	+0.17	0	0
Serb List	210	0.26	–0.1	0	0
Fjala	109	0.14	–0.11	0	0
Partia Balliste	84	0.10	New	0	New
Total	80,413	100.00	–	51	0
Source: KQZ (votes)

== Aftermath ==
Përparim Rama won the Mayoral race, winning about 51% of the vote, bringing back the capital to LDK for the first time since 2013. Arben Vitia came second with 49% of the vote and a difference of 1,600 votes from Rama. Vitia's loss has been attributed to the overconfidence and arrogance of Vetëvendosje in the legislative election. Rama's green agenda also attributet to his win as many voters in Pristina consider pollution as their top problem. Vetëvendosje remained the most-voted party in the municipal assembly winning roughly 33% of the vote. The biggest increase was made by the Democratic Party growing nearly 7% and gaining 3 additional seats. Rama created a coalition with the Democratic Party.
