= Selim Pacolli =

Kosovar politician

Deputy Mayor of Pristina
- Incumbent
- Assumed office 27 December 2017
- Preceded by: Dardan Sejdiu

Personal details
- Born: 21 September 1969 (age 57) Marec, Pristina, Kosovo, Yugoslavia
- Party: New Kosovo Alliance (2008–present); Democratic League of Kosovo (1991–2008)
- Children: 3
- Website: Government website

Selim Isa Pacolli (born 21 September 1969) is a Kosovo politician of Albanian ethnicity who serves as the Deputy Mayor of Pristina since 27 December 2017. Pacolli, from 2011 to 2018 was the General Director of Swiss Diamond Prishtina.

== Early life and education ==
Selim Pacolli was born in the village of Marec, near Pristina where he spent his entire childhood and completed primary education. He graduated from Xhevdet Doda High School and then completed studies on economics. Shortly after, in the beginning of 90's amid political crisis in Kosovo, Selim managed to get engaged in managerial duties inside and outside the country.

== Career ==
As an economist, at an early age, Pacolli took the responsibility of managing and directing Mabetex Project Engineering, where he served as General Director from 1992 to 2004. In 2005 he was appointed as the head of ATV Media Group and directed Lajm newspaper, which quickly gained national attention and trust while Selim Pacolli was the Director due to investigative journalism, courage and critical approach. 2011 would mark the start of another success story with Swiss Diamond Prishtina's opening in the heart of the capital. The five-star hotel, with Pacolli as Director turned into a reference point and today it's perceived as a symbol of Pristina in modern days. In 2014, the Hotel was chosen as 'Best Business Hotel' in Kosovo by 'Business Destination Travel Awards'.

== Role in Kosovo Liberation Army ==
Selim Pacolli was 29 years old when he returned in Kosovo and joined the Kosovo Liberation Army as a soldier in Gollak zone.

== Political activity ==
Pacolli got involved in politics at the age of 22 by joining in the structures of Democratic League of Kosovo's fifth branch in Pristina. He contributed in the Youth Forum during the difficult times of 90's in Kosovo while also remained a LDK member after the Kosovo War ended. In 2007, New Kosovo Alliance was formed and a year after, Pacolli was appointed as Secretary of the party. His time in the duty from 2008-2010 is still remembered for the massive work done within the party structure. Due to different circumstances and commitments, Selim halted his political activity in 2010.

In August 2017, he returned in politics by joining the race for Pristina's mayor. With a very positive campaign which was considered by many as the best and the most creative in years, Pacolli managed to get ranked as the third most voted candidate in the first round. For New Kosovo Alliance, Pacolli's performance marked the most successful one a party candidate had in Pristina since 2009. In the second round, Pacolli publicly supported Shpend Ahmeti which won his second term as the Mayor of Pristina. On 27 December, Selim Pacolli was appointed as Deputy Mayor of the capital.

== Personal life ==
Selim Pacolli is married and a father of three; Fatbardha, Fatlume and Fisnik. Pacolli is the brother of politician and business man Behgjet Pacolli. He speaks three foreign languages; English, Croatian and Italian.
