= Dardan =

Dardan or Dardans may refer to:

- Dardanoi, an ancient people of the Troad
- Dardani, an ancient people of the Balkans
- Dardan (given name)
- Dardan Mushkolaj, German-Albanian rapper
- Constantin Dardan, Moldovan politician
- Hoseynabad-e Dardan, a village in Iran

== See also ==
- Dardanus (disambiguation)
- Dardania (disambiguation)
- Kamenica, Kosovo, Albanian name Dardana or Dardanë
