= Bunjaku =

Bunjaku is a surname of Kosovo-Albanian origin. Notable people with the surname include:

- Alban Bunjaku (born 1994), English-born Kosovan footballer
- Albert Bunjaku (born 1983), Kosovan football player and coach
- Dafina Gexha-Bunjaku (born 1975), Kosovan epidemiologist and politician
- Fatjon Bunjaku (2003–2026), Kosovan footballer
- Gentian Bunjaku (born 1993), Kosovan-born Swiss footballer
- Imran Bunjaku (born 1992), Swiss-born Kosovan footballer
- Orges Bunjaku (born 2001), Swiss-born Kosovan footballer

== See also ==
- Albert Bunjaki (born 1971 as Albert Bunjaku), Kosovan-Swedish football player and coach
- Bunjaku Han (1948–2002), Taiwanese-Japanese actress
