= Pacolli =

Pacolli is a surname. Notable people with the surname include:

- Behgjet Pacolli (born 1951), Kosovo politician and businessman
- Selim Pacolli (born 1969), Kosovo politician
