= List of homonymous states and regions =

The following is a list of homonymous states and regions.

== National entities and subnational entities ==
This is a list of national entities bearing the same or similar names as subnational entities. For a general list of divided regions bearing the same or similar names, see Divided regions.

- Armenia (country) and Armenia (city in Colombia)
- Azerbaijan (country) and Azerbaijan (historical region of Iran)
- Bihar (state of India) and Bihar (former county of Hungary)
- Benin (country) and Benin (traditional kingdom in Nigeria)
- Bosnia and Herzegovina (country) and Federation of Bosnia and Herzegovina (political entity of Bosnia and Herzegovina)
- Congo (country, Democratic Republic of the, capital Kinshasa) and Congo (country, Republic of the, capital Brazzaville)
- China (country, Republic of, capital Taipei) and China (country, People's Republic of, capital Beijing)
- Georgia (country) and Georgia (state of the United States)
- Guatemala (country) and Guatemala (department of Guatemala)
- Guyana (country), Guiana (department of France) and Guayana (region of Venezuela)
- Luxembourg (country) and Luxembourg (province of Belgium)
- Moldova (country) and Moldova (historical region of Romania)
- Mexico (country) and Mexico (state of Mexico)
- Panama (country) and Panamá (province of Panama)
- Papua New Guinea (country) and Papua (province of Indonesia)
- Niger (country) and Niger (state of Nigeria)
- Serbia (country) and Serb Republic (Region of Bosnia and Herzegovina)
- Somalia (country) and Somali (region and state of Ethiopia)
- Korea (country, Republic of, capital Seoul) and Korea (country, Democratic People's Republic of, capital Pyongyang)

== Subnational entities ==
This is a list of subnational entities that bear the same or similar names. For a list of divided subnational entities, see Divided regions.

- Baden (historical territory of Germany) and Baden (district of Switzerland)
- Galicia (autonomous community of Spain), Galicia (historical province of Poland) and Galicia (historical province of Ukraine)
- Jura (Swiss canton) and Jura (department of France)
- Karelia (federation subject of Russia) and Karelia (historical province of Finland)
- Lapland (province of Sweden) and Lapland (region of Finland)
- Limburg (province of Belgium) and Limburg (province of Netherlands)
- Montana (state of the United States) and Montana (capital of Montana Province in Bulgaria)
- Munster (province of Ireland) and Münster (city in Germany)
- New Britain (island of Papua New Guinea) and New Britain (historical area of Canada)
- Kurdistan (Autonomous region in Iraq) and Kurdistan (province in Iran)
- New South Wales (state of Australia) and New South Wales (historical area of Canada)
- Paraná (state of Brazil) and Paraná (city in Argentina)
- Punjab (state of India) and Punjab (province of Pakistan)

== Ancient regions ==
This is a list of ancient regions that bear the same or similar names. For a list of formerly divided regions, see Formerly divided regions.

- Belgica was originally one of the Latin names of the Netherlands and the French Belgique was used as a translation of the same country's name. However, after the Southern Netherlands became independent as Belgium, it became common to refer to - the Netherlands in French as Pays-Bas instead.
- Galatia (in Asia and Europe)
- Palestine (region) and the State of Palestine

== See also ==
- Albania (placename)
- Dardania
