= Dardan (given name) =

- Gender: Male

Origin
- Meaning: Dardani
- Region of origin: Kosovo, Albania

Dardan is an Albanian masculine given name, derived from the Dardani, an Illyrian tribe who lived in the Balkans. Their name may derive from an Illyrian word meaning "pear" (modern Albanian: "dardha"). The name may refer to:

- Dardan Aliu (born 1993), Kosovar Albanian DJ
- Dardan Berisha (born 1988), Kosovar-Polish basketball player
- Dardan Çerkini (born 1991), Kosovar Albanian football defender
- Dardan Dehari (born 1990), Macedonian-Albanian alpine ski racer
- Dardan Dreshaj (born 1992), Norwegian football striker
- Dardan Gashi (born 1969), Kosovar Albanian politician and author
- Dardan Kapiti (born 2000), Kosovar basketball player
- Dardan Karimani (born 1998), Kosovar Albanian football midfielder
- Dardan Molliqaj (born 1985), Kosovar Albanian politician
- Dardan Mushkolaj (born 1997), German-Albanian rapper
- Dardan Mustafa (born 1992), German-born Swedish footballer
- Dardan Rexhepi (born 1992), Kosovar Albanian footballer
- Dardan Sejdiu (born 1979), Kosovar Albanian politician
- Dardan Selimaj (born 1984), Kosovar Albanian journalist, producer and music theorist
- Dardan Shabanhaxhaj (born 2001), Kosovar footballer
- Dardan Vuthaj (born 1995), Albanian football goalkeeper
