= Aqorda Residence =

Official workplace of the president of Kazakhstan

Akorda
- Ақорда
- Interactive map of the Akorda area

General information
- Location: Astana, Kazakhstan
- Coordinates: 51°07′33″N 71°26′47″E
- Current tenants: President of Kazakhstan
- Construction started: 2001
- Completed: 2004

Height
- Roof: 80 m (260 ft)

Technical details
- Floor count: 7
- Floor area: 36,720 m^{2} (395,300 sq ft) (total)

Design and construction
- Main contractor: Mabetex group

The Akorda Residence (Kazakh: Ақорда резиденциясы, Aqorda rezidentsiyasy, lit. 'White Horde Residency') is the official workplace of the president of Kazakhstan, located in the capital city of Astana. The Palace was built within three years, and officially opened in 2004. It was built by the Mabetex Group, founded by Behgjet Pacolli, 3rd President of Kosovo and 1st Deputy Prime Minister of Kosovo.

Situated on the left bank of the Ishim (Esil) River, it is the president’s place of work and houses the staff of the Presidential Administration; it is not the president’s place of residence. The palace includes a blue and gold dome topped with a spire. This golden statue atop the dome includes a sun with 32 rays at its apex, and also includes a steppe eagle flying beneath the sun.

The building's height (including the spire) is 80 meters. The first floor includes a Grand Central Hall, the Hall of Press Conferences, the Gala Hall, and the Winter Garden. The second floor includes offices, while the third floor is used for international events, and includes various halls (Marble Hall; Golden Hall; Oval Hall; Oriental Hall, built in the form of a yurt; the Hall of Extended Negotiations). The fourth floor includes a Dome Hall, meeting hall for the Government of the Republic, and the Library.

The color gold features prominently throughout the complex and twenty-one types of marble were used for the floor patterns.

== Gallery ==
Ak Orda at night

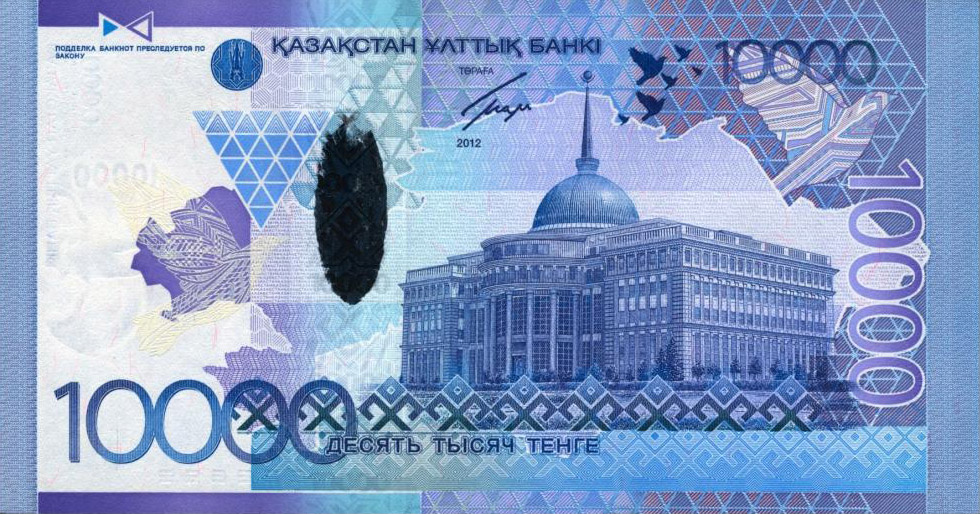
2012 series 10,000 tenge note featuring Ak Orda

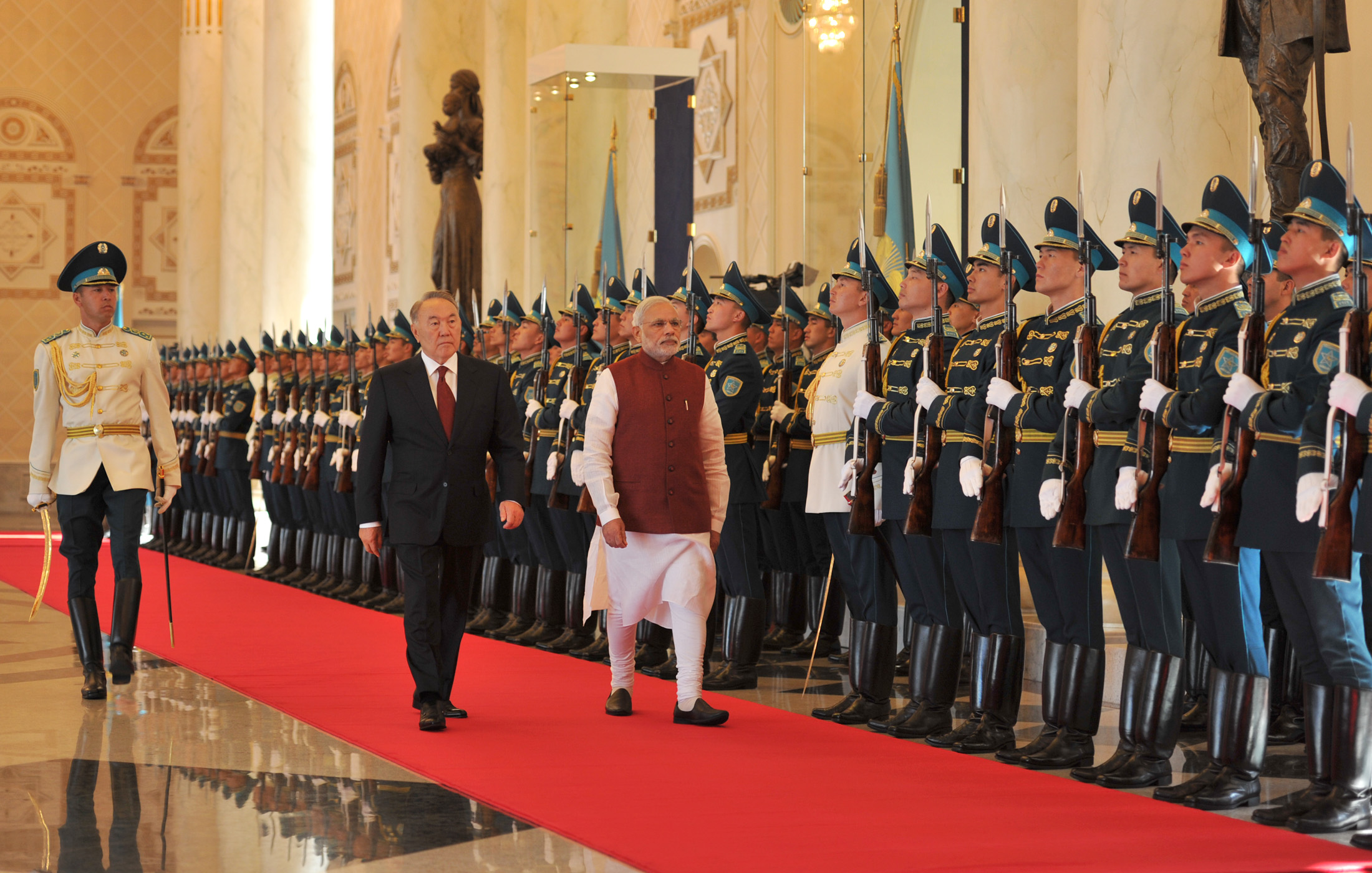
Kazakh President Nursultan Nazarbayev and Indian Prime Minister Narendra Modi inspecting the Guard of Honour, Ak Orda (2015)
