= Arben Vitia =

Kosovar politician; Minister of Health

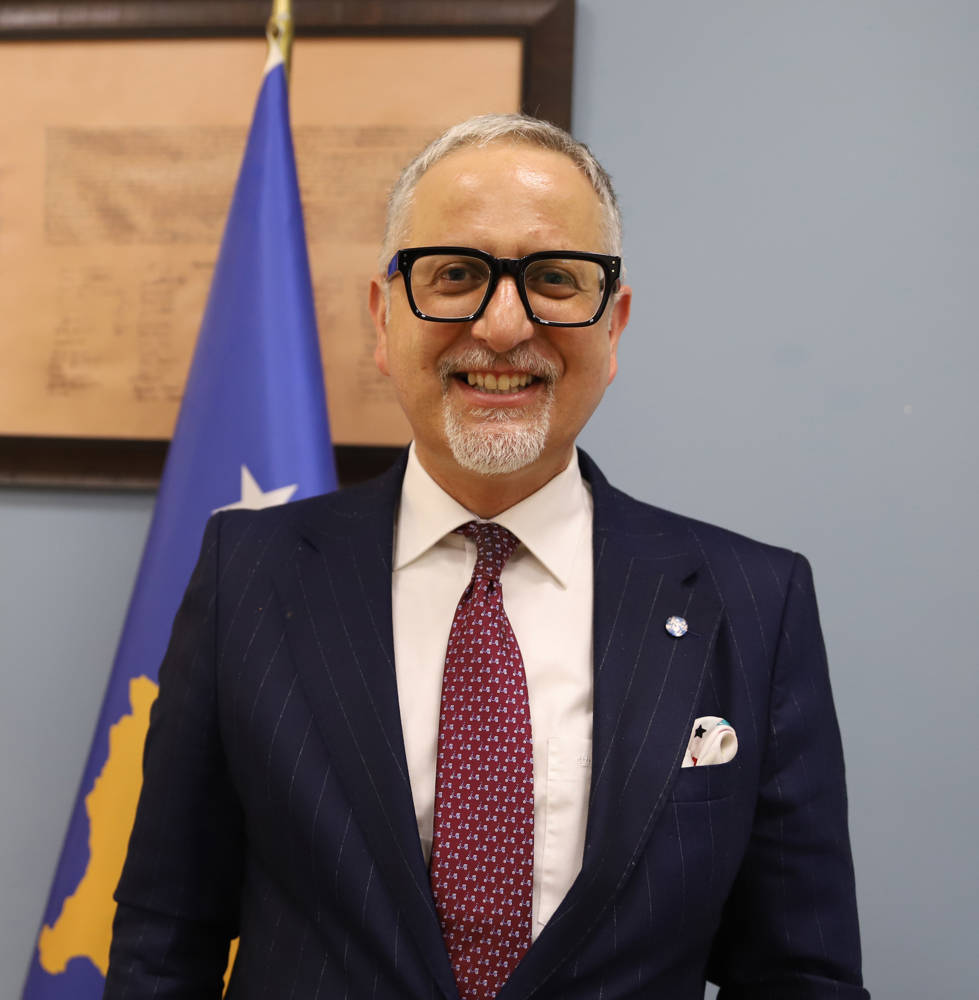
- Official portrait, 2023

Minister of Health
- Incumbent
- Assumed office 26 December 2022
- President: Vjosa Osmani; Albulena Haxhiu (acting)
- Prime Minister: Albin Kurti
- Preceded by: Dafina Gexha-Bunjaku (acting)
- In office 22 March 2021 – 1 October 2021
- President: Glauk Konjufca (acting); Vjosa Osmani
- Prime Minister: Albin Kurti
- Preceded by: Armend Zemaj
- Succeeded by: Rifat Latifi
- In office 4 February 2020 – 3 June 2020
- President: Hashim Thaçi
- Prime Minister: Albin Kurti
- Preceded by: Uran Ismaili
- Succeeded by: Armend Zemaj

Personal details
- Born: 24 December 1973 (age 52) Pristina, SFR Yugoslavia (now Kosovo)
- Party: Vetëvendosje
- Spouse: Merita Kasumi Vitia
- Children: 2
- Education: University of Tirana

Arben Vitia (born 24 December 1973) is a Kosovar medical doctor and politician, who previously served as minister of health of Kosovo.

== Education and early career ==
He received his education at the University of Tirana, Albania, and worked as a general practitioner and consultant in Kosovo. In 2010, he join the Vetëvendosje Movement, then a nascent opposition party in Kosovo politics. Having led Vetëvendosje's healthcare committee in the past, he has been the leader of the party branch in the municipality of Prishtina since 2018.

In 2013–2018, Vitia served as director of the healthcare and social welfare department at the Municipality of Pristina.

== Minister of health ==
=== Kurti I Government ===
In the 2019 parliamentary elections, Vitia earned a seat with Vetëvendosje, which became the largest political party in the country. On 3 February 2020, he gave up his seat to be sworn in as minister of health in the first Kurti government. His handling of the COVID-19 pandemic received international acclaim.

=== Kurti II Government ===
Vitia returned to government after the 2021 elections, as a candidate for MP, but resigned to serve as minister of health in the second Kurti government. He focused primarily on COVID-19 vaccination during his term. With no vaccination available when he took office, Vitia secured 2.3 million vaccines administered to over 60 percent of the population within 8 months.

=== Mayoral elections ===
In August 2021, Vitia was chosen as Vetëvendosje's candidate for mayor of Pristina, but declined to campaign while serving as health minister. He was released from office on 1 October 2021, roughly two weeks prior to the election, which was held on 17 October. He came at the top in the first round with 46.3 percent of the vote, but he was defeated by Përparim Rama in the 14 November runoff. Vitia remained active as a member of the Vetëvendosje presidency and leader of the Pristina branch.

=== Return to government ===
On 26 December 2022, Vitia was reappointed minister of health. His proposed law on price control for medicines was approved by parliament the following year. He improved supply with essential medicines, reformed funding mechanisms for specialized treatment abroad, and eliminated wait-lists for cancer radiotherapy patients. He further increased funding for family medicine centers and palliative treatment, and secured an added budget of 100 million euros for health care.

== Family life ==
He is married to Merita Kasumi Vitia, a pediatrician, and has two sons.
