= Dafina Gexha-Bunjaku =

Kosovar Albanian epidemiologist, politician

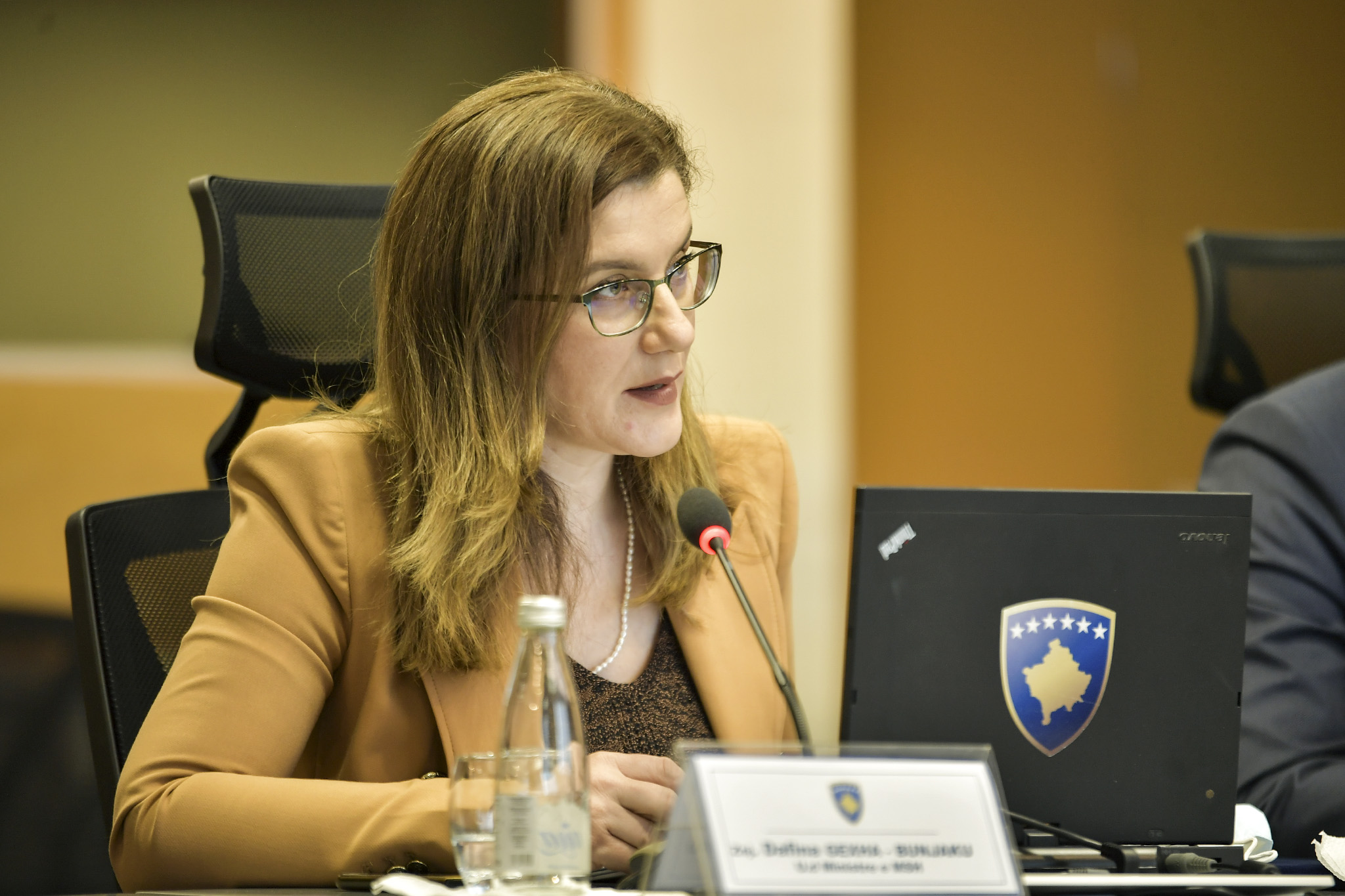
- Government meeting, 2021

Deputy Minister of Health
- Incumbent
- Assumed office 7 April 2021
- President: Glauk Konjufca (acting); Vjosa Osmani
- Prime Minister: Albin Kurti
- Minister: Arben Vitia; Herself (acting); Rifat Latifi

Acting Minister of Health
- In office 7 October 2022 – 26 December 2022
- President: Vjosa Osmani
- Prime Minister: Albin Kurti
- Preceded by: Rifat Latifi
- Succeeded by: Arben Vitia
- In office 1 October 2021 – 16 November 2021
- President: Vjosa Osmani
- Prime Minister: Albin Kurti
- Preceded by: Arben Vitia
- Succeeded by: Rifat Latifi

Personal details
- Born: 10 November 1975 (age 50) Gjakova, SFR Yugoslavia (now Kosovo)
- Party: Vetëvendosje
- Education: University of Pristina

Dafina Gexha-Bunjaku (born 10 November 1975) is a Kosovar epidemiologist and current deputy minister of health of Kosovo. After a successful career with the Kosovo Institute of Public Health, she joined the second Kurti government as deputy minister in March 2021. She acted as minister from 1 October to 16 November 2021.

== Education ==
Gexha-Bunjaku received her MD degree from the University of Pristina in 2004, after a hiatus during the Kosovo War and its aftermath. In 2011, she completed her residency with the National Institute of Public Health and obtained an MBA in health management from a joint program of the University of Pristina and the University of Vienna.

== Career ==
From 2000 to 2013, Gexha-Bunjaku worked with the World Health Organization office in Pristina, HLSP Institute, and other health-related programs and consultancies assisting the Ministry of Health. In January 2008, she joined the National Institute for Public Health as an epidemiologist – a position she held for over 13 years, until her current government position.

During the early stages of the COVID-19 pandemic in Kosovo, while part of the national public health institute, Gexha-Bunjaku helped draft prevention and control measures that received international praise. She also served as the Kosovo coordinator for the European Centre for Disease Prevention and Control and co-designed the family medicine program supported by WHO and the UK Royal College of General Practitioners.

Gexha-Bunjaku's research on HIV and communicable diseases has been published internationally.
