= Swiss Diamond Prishtina =

Hotel in Pristina, Kosovo

Swiss Diamond Hotel Prishtina
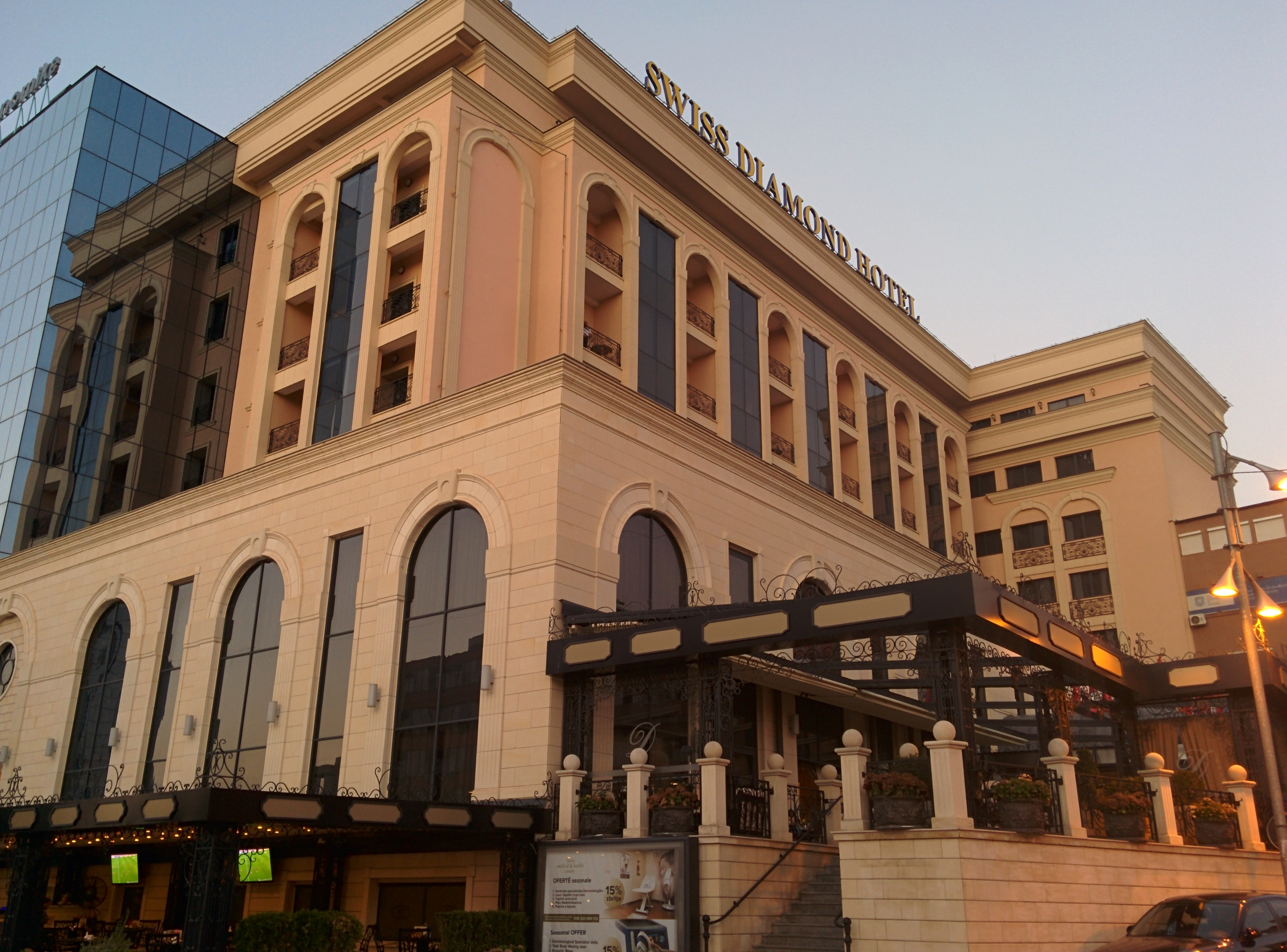
- Interactive map of the Swiss Diamond Hotel Prishtina area

General information
- Location: Pristina, Kosovo, Sheshi Nëna Terezë 10000
- Opening: 2011
- Owner: Mabetex

Technical details
- Floor count: 7
- Floor area: 1,200 M2

Other information
- Number of rooms: 141
- Number of restaurants: 2 (+2 bars)

Website
- Official Page

The Swiss Diamond Hotel Prishtina is a luxury five star Hotel in Pristina, Kosovo. It is located on Sheshi Nëna Terezë, the main boulevard in the central district of the city.

The Hotel is internationally awarded with the International Star Diamond Award from the American Academy of Hospitality Sciences for its luxurious ambiance and the personalized services offered.

== History ==
The Swiss Diamond Hotel opened on December 1, in 2011, after renovating the old existing hotel Iliria. The Iliria was privatized on 2006 by Mabetex and Union Commerce, with Albanian businessman Behgjet Pacolli as main shareholder.

== Gallery ==
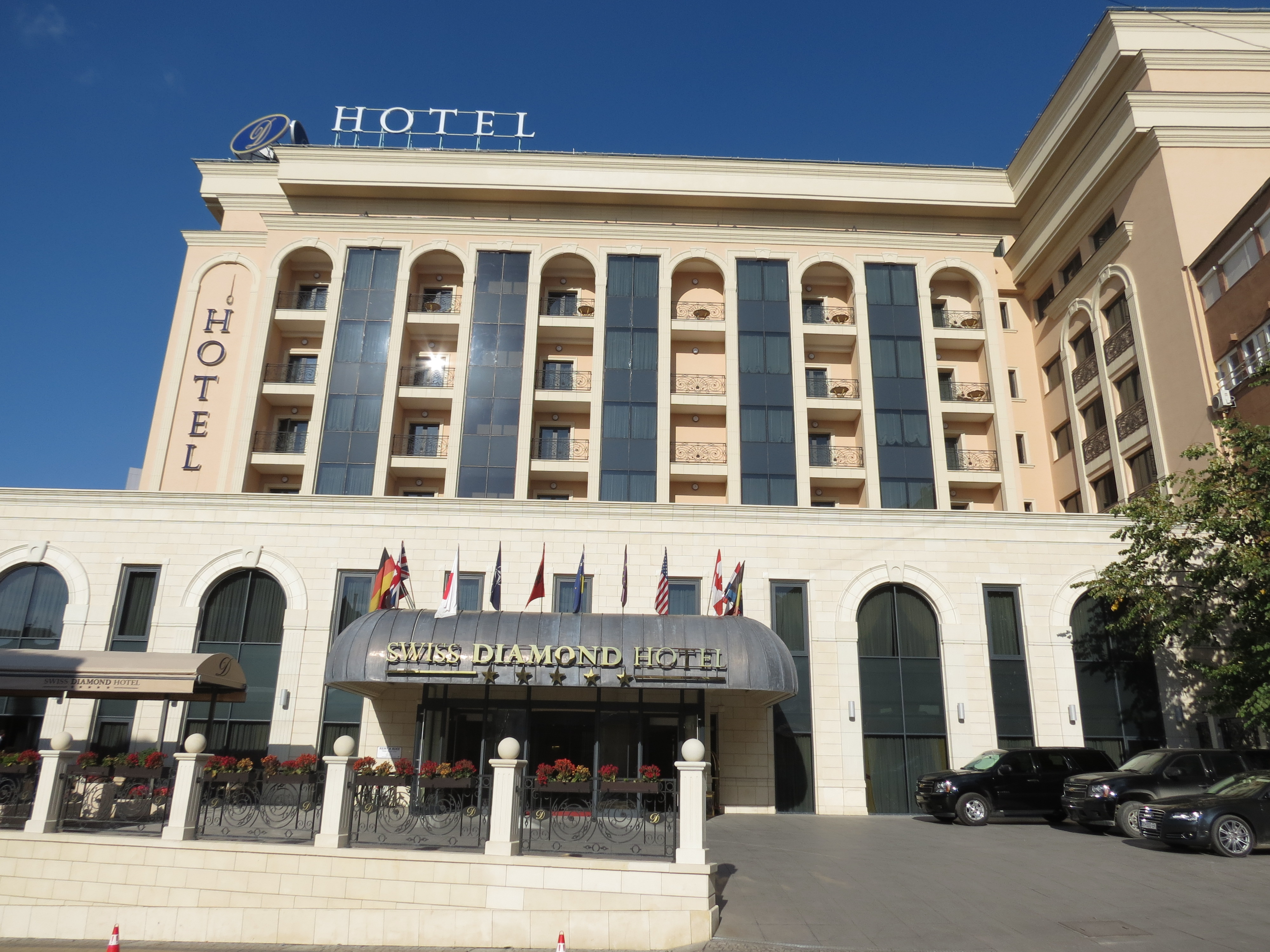

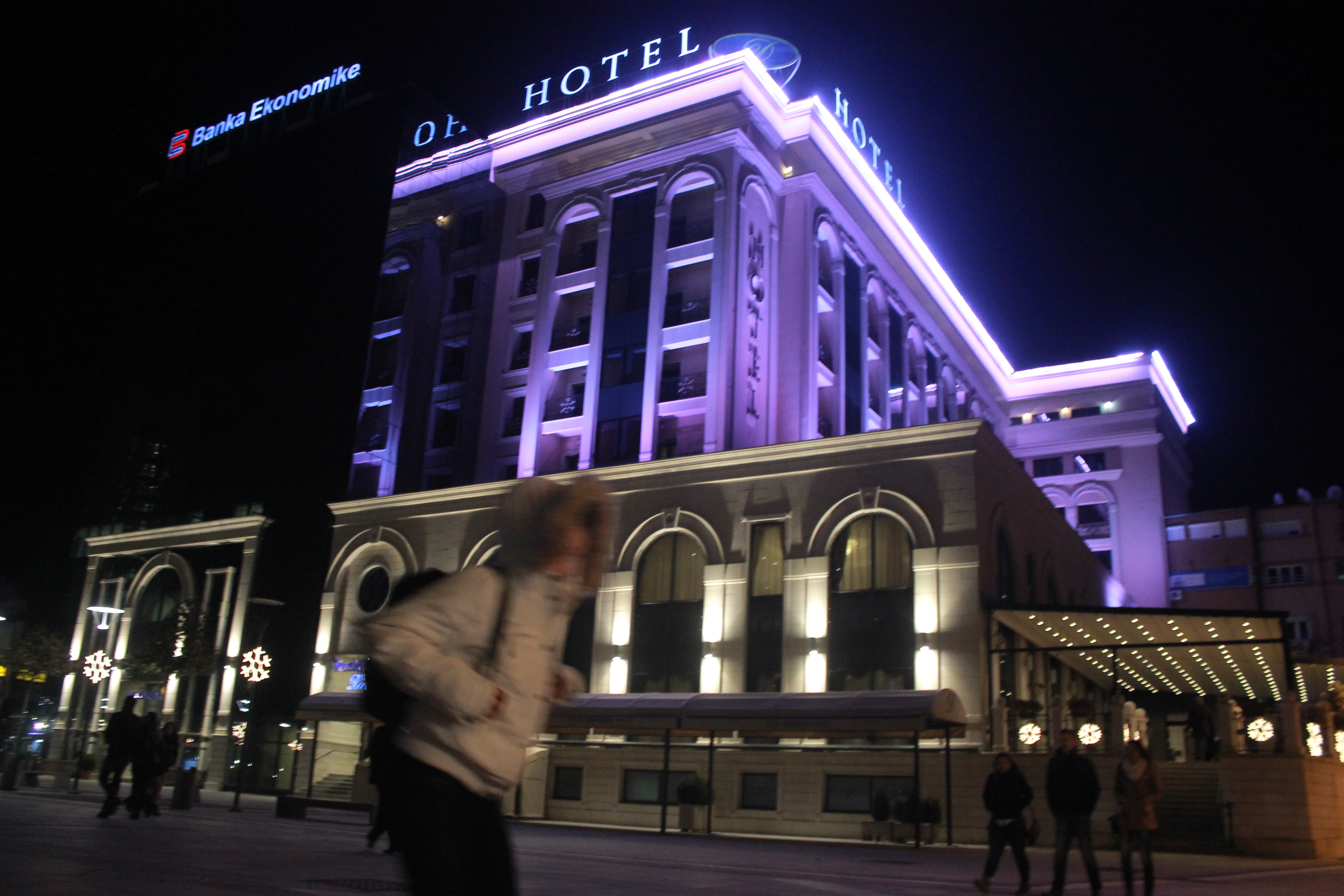

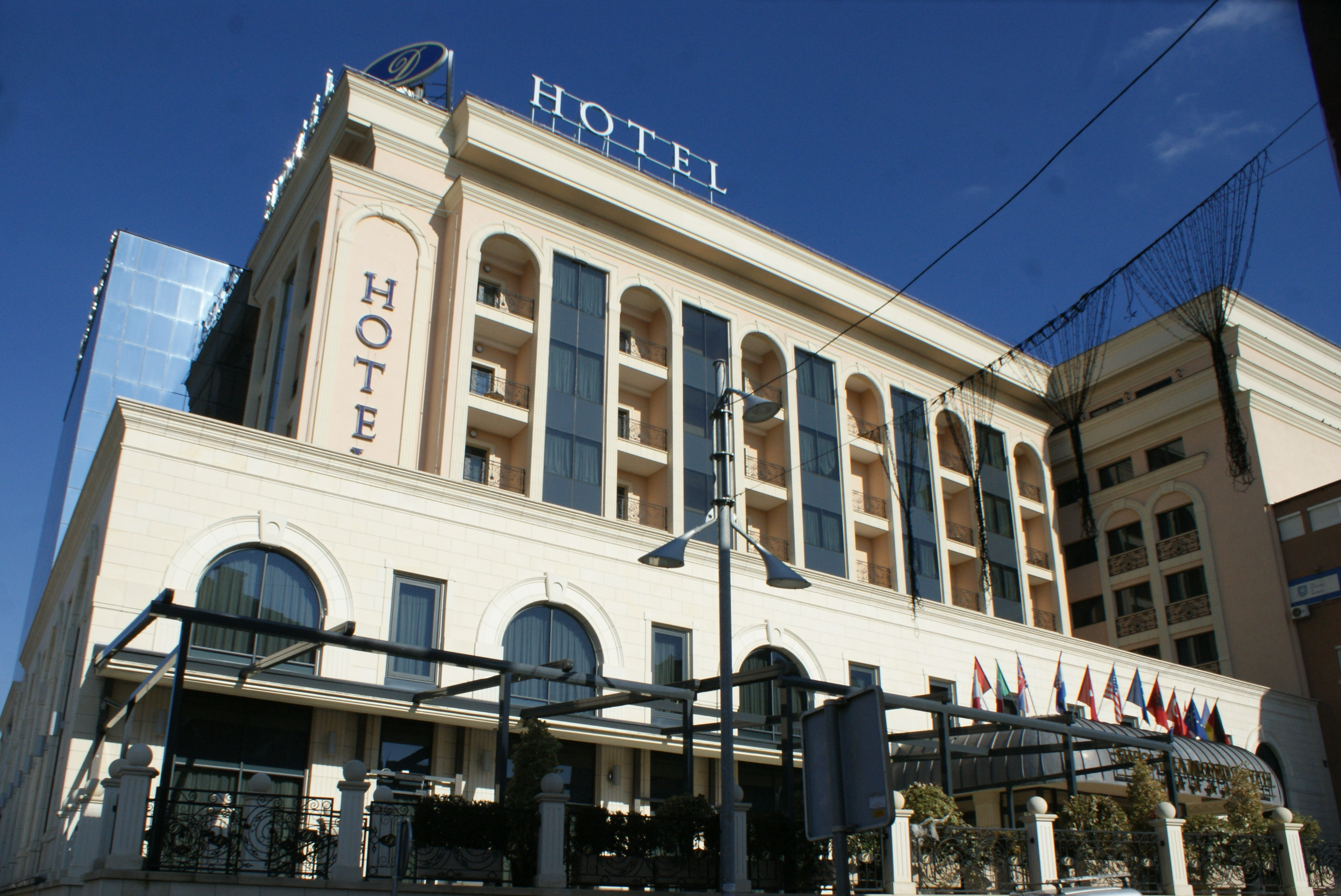
