= Dardanus =

Dardanus or Dardanos may refer to:

== Greek mythology ==
- Dardanus (mythology), the name of several figures from Greek mythology, including:
  - Dardanus (son of Zeus), the son of Zeus and Electra, and ancestor of the Trojans
  - Dardanus (son of Illyrius)
  - Dardanus (mythological king), a Scythian king, and the father of Idaea who was the wife of King Phineus

== People ==
- Dardanus of Athens, a Stoic philosopher, c. 100 BC
- Caius Posthumus Dardanus, a praetorian prefect of Gaul from the early fifth century

== Astronomy ==
- Dardanus Sulcus, a bright, tectonic, grooved terrain on Ganymede, the largest moon of Jupiter.

== Music ==
- Dardanus (Rameau), an opera in five acts by Jean-Philippe Rameau
- Dardanus (Sacchini), an opera in four acts by Antonio Sacchini
- Dardanus (Raymond Leppard recording), an album of 1981

== Drama ==
- Dardanus, a lost play by the Greek comic poet Menander
- Dardanus, a lost play by the Roman comic poet Caecilius Statius

== Animals ==
- Dardanus (crustacean), genus of hermit crabs belonging to the family Diogenidae

== Other ==
- Dardanus (city), an ancient city on the coast of the Hellespont
- Treaty of Dardanos, a peace treaty between Rome and Pontus, 85 BC

== See also ==
- Dardan (disambiguation)
