= Shpend Ahmeti =

Kosovar politician

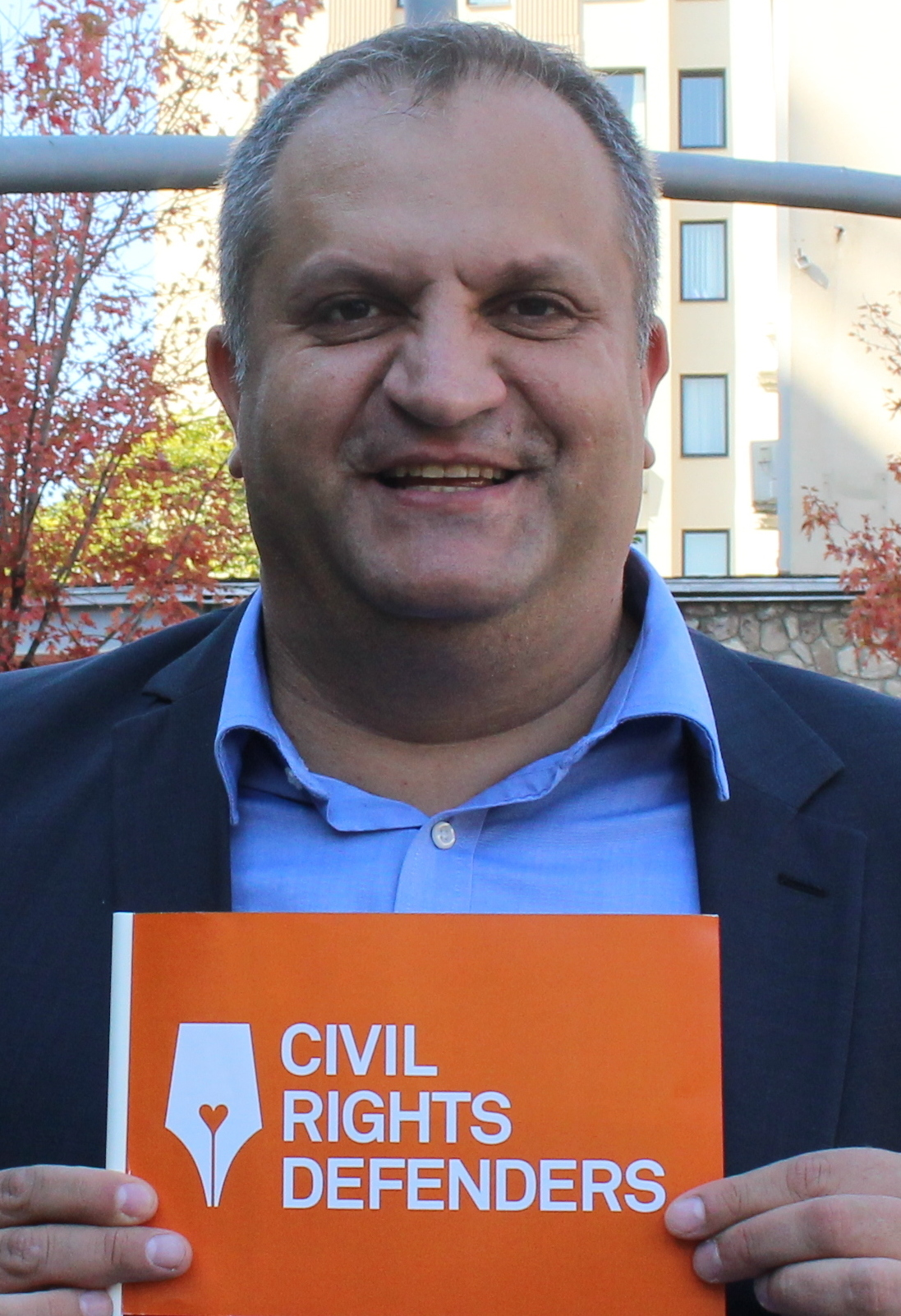

Mayor of Pristina
- In office 26 December 2013 – 7 December 2021
- Deputy: Dardan Sejdiu (2014–2017); Selim Pacolli (2017–2021)
- Preceded by: Isa Mustafa
- Succeeded by: Përparim Rama

Leader of the Social Democratic Party
- In office 9 May 2018 – 15 December 2019
- Preceded by: Bajram Kelmendi
- Succeeded by: Dardan Molliqaj

Vice-leader of Vetëvendosje
- In office 31 March 2011 – 7 March 2018

Leader of New Spirit Party
- In office 5 November 2010 – 31 March 2011
- Preceded by: Office established
- Succeeded by: Office abolished

Personal details
- Born: 18 April 1978 (age 48) Pristina, SFR Yugoslavia
- Party: Social Democratic Party of Kosovo (2018–2019)
- Other political affiliations: Vetëvendosje (2011–2018); New Spirit Party (2010–2011)
- Spouse: Ardiana Gjinolli-Ahmeti
- Children: 2
- Education: American University in Bulgaria; Harvard University (M.P.A.)
- Known for: Mayor of Prishtina

Shpend Ali Ahmeti (born 18 April 1978, Pristina) is a Kosovar politician who served as the mayor of Pristina. He was leader of the New Spirit Party, which merged into Vetëvendosje in 2011, and served as their vice chairman. However, after internal disputes he left the party in 2018 to become the leader of the Social Democratic Party of Kosovo. In 2019 he became an independent politician.

Ahmeti lectured public policy at the American University in Kosovo before he became mayor.

In the first round of elections on 3 November 2013, Ahmeti was around 8,000 votes behind Isa Mustafa, but in the second round on 1 December 2013 he won by around 2,500 votes. Mustafa accused Ahmeti of fraud. Ahmeti's win was eventually confirmed, ending 15 years of LDK tenure in the capital of Kosovo.

In October 2017 he ran in the local elections as a candidate of Vetëvendosje again and successfully managed to keep his position as mayor of Prishtina.

== Education ==
He has completed university studies in Economics and Business Administration at the American University in Bulgaria, during the years 1996–2000, specializing in Applied Economics and Business Administration. During the studies between the years 1999–2002, Mr. Ahmeti was senator and then the President of the Student Government at American University in Bulgaria, as well as leader of various communities (from more than ten countries) through the period of reforms at university. At the American Universities, involvement in the students’ government is the experience that combines knowledge, organization, confronting the protection of the rights and responsibility of faith from friends and colleagues.

== Political career ==
Shpend Ahmeti founded the Fryma e Re party on November 5, 2010, together with Ilir Deda and other Harvard University graduates, which participated in the 2010/2011 parliamentary elections in Kosovo but failed to clear the five-percent hurdle. On March 31, 2011, Fryma e Re merged with the civic movement Vetëvendosje! (VV). Ahmeti thus became the deputy party chairman of VV.

In the 2013 local elections in Kosovo, Shpend Ahmeti ran as an opponent to Isa Mustafa (LDK), the longtime mayor of Kosovo's capital. Voter turnout in Pristina was 50.8 percent, and in the first round of voting on November 3, neither achieved the necessary majority, so a second round of voting was ordered for December 1.

== Employment ==
Ahmeti worked for World Bank on Kosovo's Public Expenditure Review, and for European Bank of Reconstruction and Development.
