= Dardania =

Dardania, Dardanian or Dardanians may refer to ancient peoples or locations.

== People ==
- Dardani, an ancient tribe in the Balkans
- Dardanians (Trojan) (Dardanoi), a people closely related to the Trojans and unrelated to the balkan tribe
- Bato of Dardania (ruled c. 206–176 BC), Illyrian king of the Dardanian State
- Capys of Dardania, king of Dardania during the Iliad and Aeneid
- Cleitus of Dardania (ruled c. 356–335 BC), Illyrian ruler
- Erichthonius of Dardania, king of Dardania in Greek mythology
- Ilus of Dardania, king of Dardania in Greek mythology
- Monunius of Dardania (ruled c. 176–167 BC), Illyrian king of the Dardanian State

== Places ==
- Kingdom of Dardania, an ancient kingdom in the Balkans established by the Dardani
- Dardania (Roman province), a Roman and Byzantine province in the Balkans
- Dardania (Troad), a city and a district of the Troad, in Asia Minor on the Hellespont (the modern Dardanelles)
- Dardania (Samothrace), old name of Samothrace according to Pausanias

== Other ==
- Democratic League of Dardania (Lidhja Demokratike e Dardanisë), a political party in Kosovo
- KF Dardania

== See also ==
- Dardan (disambiguation)
