= Hoseynabad-e Dardan =

Hoseynabad-e Dardan حسين ابادداردان
- Village
- Location within Iran
- Coordinates: 30°17′22″N 52°24′51″E
- Country: Iran
- Province: Fars
- County: Marvdasht
- Bakhsh: Dorudzan
- Rural District: Dorudzan

Population (2006)
  - Total: 72
- Time zone: UTC+3:30 (IRST)
  - Summer (DST): UTC+4:30 (IRDT)

Hoseynabad-e Dardan (Persian: حسين ابادداردان, also Romanized as Ḩoseynābād-e Dārdān; also known as Ḩoseynābād and Ḩoseynābād-e Dārdūn) is a village in Dorudzan Rural District, Dorudzan District, Marvdasht County, Fars province, Iran. At the 2006 census, its population was 72, in 15 families.
