= Rifat Latifi =

Politician in Kosovo

Rifat Latifi (born 1955) is a Kosovar-American surgeon and former Minister of Health of Kosovo.

Latifi was born in Kllodernica, Skenderaj, and completed secondary education in Pristina. He received his MD degree from the University of Prishtina in 1982 and emigrated to the United States later April 8, 1985.

He initially worked as a researcher in Houston, Texas, and Pennsylvania Hospital in Philadelphia, the oldest hospital in the US, then completed his residency in surgery at the Cleveland Clinic and Yale University. He completed a fellowship in traumatology and surgical critical care at the New York College of Medicine [Lincoln Hospital, Bronx, New York].

Latifi has worked with clinical centers in Texas, Philadelphia, New York, Qatar, and Arizona. He has taught at the University of Arizona and served as president of the Arizona Chapter of the American College of Surgeons. He pioneered telemedicine in Kosovo, Albania, and Cabo Verde and authored hundreds of articles published in scientific journals.

He was appointed minister of health in the second Kurti government on 16 November 2021. He resigned on 6 October 2022.
