= Dardan Molliqaj =

Albanian politician

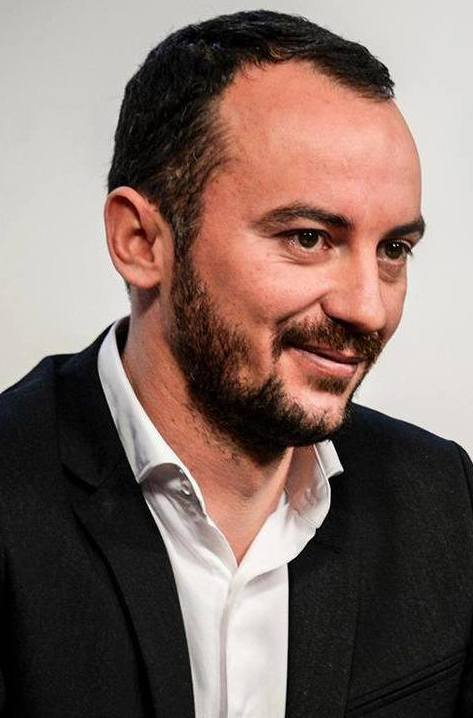
- Dardan Molliqaj in 2016

Leader of the Social Democratic Party
- Incumbent
- Assumed office 15 December 2019
- Preceded by: Shpend Ahmeti

Deputy of the Republic of Kosovo
- In office 3 August 2017 – 27 November 2019

Member of the Commission for Budget & Finance
- In office October 2017 – November 2019

Member of the Headship of PSD
- In office 9 May 2017 – 15 December 2019

Personal details
- Born: 25 February 1985 (age 41) Deçan, Kosovo
- Party: Social Democratic Party of Kosovo
- Spouse(s): Unknown (div. 2015) Besa Shahini (m. 2019)
- Children: Ana Molliqaj
- Education: University of Pristina

Dardan Molliqaj (born 25 February 1985) is a Kosovo Albanian politician from Kosovo who serves as a deputy from the Social Democratic Party of Kosovo in the Kosovo Parliament. Dardan became a deputy in the Parliament of Kosovo from the 2017 general elections with Lëvizja Vetëvendosje. Before his candidature as deputy, he worked as the Organizational Secretary in Vetëvendosje from the year 2011 until his resignation in June 2017. Molliqaj, a self declared social democrat of the center left, supports the fight against economical inequality and also has taken concrete steps towards continuous cooperation between the Republic of Kosovo and the Republic of Albania.

== Political career ==
In 2017, Molliqaj ran on the general elections in Kosovo as a deputy for the Self-Determination Movement (Levizja Vetëvendosje!) and won a seat on the Fifth Legislation as the sixth most voted candidate in Kosovo. Shortly after he won the seat, he changed the party and continued his political career in PSD. During his mandate, he proposed two resolutions between the Republic of Kosovo and the Republic of Albania: one for the removal of the roaming services and another for removing the border checkpoints between the two states. Both resolutions were voted by the majority in the Republic of Kosovo parliament.
