= Mayor of Pristina =

Executive head of the City of Pristina government, Kosovo

- Kryetari i Komunës së Prishtinës
- Coat of Arms of Pristina

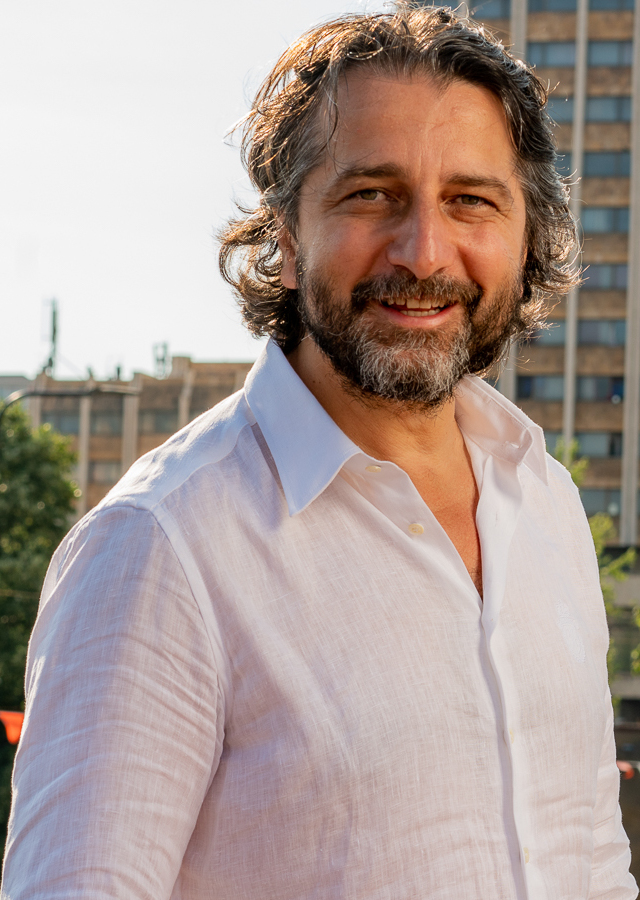
- Incumbent; Përparim Rama since 7 December 2021
- Style: Mayor
- Member of: City Assembly
- Reports to: City Assembly
- Residence: No official residence
- Term length: 4 years, unlimited number of renewals
- Website: Official website

The mayor of Pristina (Albanian: Prishtinë; Serbian: Приштина or Priština) is the head of the City of Pristina (capital of Kosovo). The mayor acts on behalf of the city and performs the executive function in the City of Pristina. In the Preliminary results of the 2011 census the population of Pristina was numbered around 198,000. The majority of population is Albanian, but there are also smaller communities including Bosniaks, Serbs, Romani and others. The surface of Pristina is 854 km^{2}. Pristina is regarded as the cultural, economical, and political centre of Kosovo. Since 2021 the current mayor is Përparim Rama. The city is home of University of Pristina, Pristina International Airport Adem Jashari, the Government Building and the Assembly of Kosovo.

== Office ==
According to the current legislation, the mayor is elected along with members of the City Assembly at the direct secret ballot for the period of four years. The mayor may not be a councillor of the City Assembly.

== List of mayors ==
| No. | Portrait | Name (Born-Died) | Term of office | | Time in office | Party |
| No. | Portrait | Name (Born-Died) | From | To | Time in office | Party |
|---|---|---|---|---|---|---|
| 1. | | Salih Gashi (1944–) | 28 October 2000 | 26 October 2002 | 1 year, 363 days | Democratic League of Kosovo |
| 2. | | Ismet Beqiri (1964–) | 26 October 2002 | 14 December 2007 | 5 years, 49 days | Democratic League of Kosovo |
| 3. | | Isa Mustafa (1951–) | 14 December 2007 | 26 December 2013 | 6 years, 12 days | Democratic League of Kosovo |
| 4. | | Shpend Ahmeti (1978–) | 26 December 2013 | 7 December 2021 | 7 years, 346 days | Vetëvendosje (until 2018) Independent (2018) Social Democratic Party of Kosovo (from 2018) |
| 5. | | Përparim Rama (1976–) | 7 December 2021 | Incumbent | 4 years, 348 days | Democratic League of Kosovo |
