= Dardan Sejdiu =

Kosovar politician

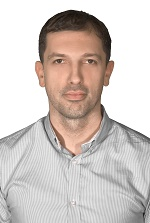

Parliamentary Group Leader of SDP
- In office 4 May 2018 – 22 August 2019
- Preceded by: Position established

Parliamentary Group Leader of GDP
- In office 14 March 2018 – 4 May 2018
- Preceded by: Position established
- Succeeded by: Position abolished

Deputy Mayor of Prishtina
- In office January 2014 – December 2017
- Succeeded by: Selim Pacolli

Personal details
- Born: 13 August 1979 (age 47) Pristina, Republic of Kosovo
- Party: Social Democratic Party of Kosovo (2018–2019); Group of the Independent Deputies (2018); Vetëvendosje (2011–2018); New Spirit Party (2010–2011)
- Education: American University in Bulgaria; IEDC-Bled School of Management (MBA)
- Known for: Deputy Mayor of Prishtina

Dardan Sejdiu (born 13 August 1979) is a Kosovo Albanian politician. He served as the leader of the parliamentary group of Social Democratic Party of Kosovo in the Assembly of the Republic of Kosovo. He also served as Deputy Mayor of Prishtina as a member of the capital of the Kosovo between 2014 and 2017, being a member of Vetëvendosje at the time. Previously, he has been engaged for four years as president of the management board of the Slovenian-Kosovo Pension with a key role in managing this fund for the whole of Kosovo. Sejdiu was a member of Vetevendosje from 2011 to 2018.

== Political career ==
Dardan Sejdiu as a member of the New Spirit Party ran in the 2010 elections, but the party did not pass the electoral threshold. In March 2011 New Spirit Party merged into Vetëvendosje, Dardan Sejdiu and Shpend Ahmeti being among them. Sejdiu was elected as member of the Pristina city council, but resigned to become deputy mayor. In 2014, he was elected as member of the Kosovo Assembly, being one of the most voted candidates of Vetëvendosje. He resigned from his seat as member of the Kosovo Assembly to continue his work as Deputy Mayor of Pristina.
