= Mabetex Group =

Swiss engineering and construction company

- Type: Società Anonima
- Industry: Construction and engineering
- Founded: 1991; 35 years ago in Lugano, Switzerland
- Founder: Behgjet Pacolli
- Headquarters: Lugano, Switzerland
- Area served: Eurasia
- Key people: Behgjet Pacolli (President & CEO); Afrim Pacolli (Co-President); Emin Pacolli (President); Agim Pacolli (Vice president)
- Owner: Behgjet Pacolli
- Website: www.mabetex.com

Mabetex Group is a civil engineering and construction company founded in 1991 by Behgjet Pacolli. The company, headquartered in Lugano, Switzerland, specialises in the construction and renovation of large buildings. Mabetex has carried out works on a turnkey base such as the restoration of historical buildings, the construction and planning of administrative and public buildings, as well as industrial plants and urban projects. Mabetex Group is best known for its renovation of Kremlin.

== Corporate structure ==
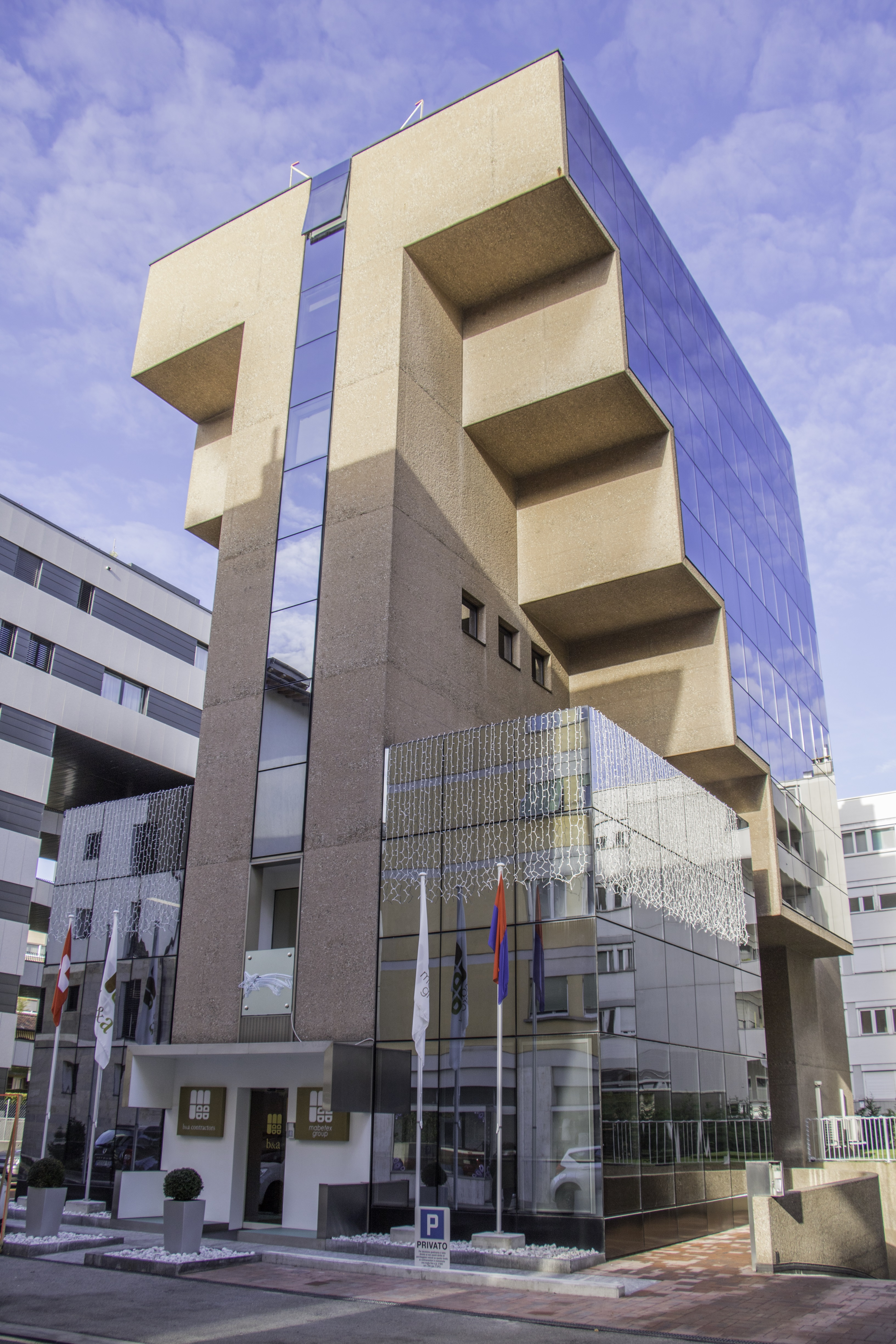
Mabetex's B&A Contractors office in Lugano

Mabetex Group is the mother company of several businesses found and owned by Behgjet Pacolli. The core company within the Mabetex Group is the civil engineering bureau Mabco Constructions SA, formerly known as Mabetex Project Engineering SA, located in Lugano. Mabetex specialises in large scale civil engineering which comprises construction and renovation of big buildings and building complexes. The Group has had many projects in former Soviet Union states. Other firms within the Mabetex Group specialise in insurance and public broadcasting. Mabco Constructions SA had, in 1997, an annual revenue of CHF 630 million; in 1996, the entire Mabetex Group grossed around CHF 1.5 billion. By 2016, the revenue had increased to around CHF 1.61 billion. In total, the Mabetex Group has about 14,000 employees, of which around 3,500 work in Kosovo. The company has more than 12 branch offices.

== History ==
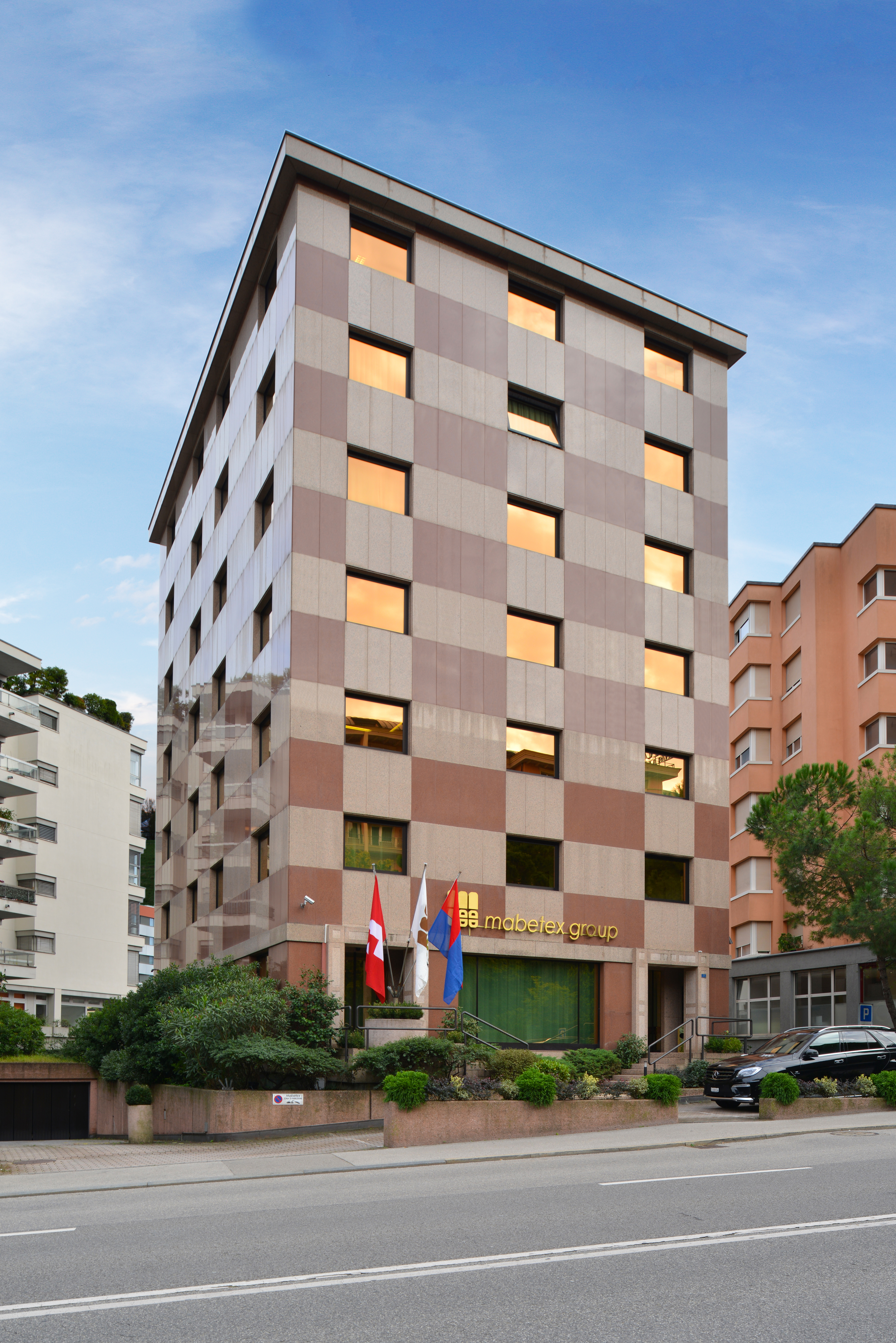
Mabetex headquarters in Lugano

Mabetex was founded in 1991 in Lugano, Switzerland by Behgjet Pacolli, who has since been serving as the president of Mabetex Group. The company rose in size through contracting with the public sector in post-Soviet Russia throughout the 1990s. Mabetex's reputation as a "can-do" contractor solidified with the renovation of the Kremlin, which the company finished in 1996. Around that time, Mabetex also began constructing most of the new buildings in Astana. After the Kosovo War, Mabetex initiated a foundation for redevelopment of Kosovo in July 1999. Mabetex reconstructed buildings and schools that had been destroyed in the war. In 2002, Mabetex sent first aid goods to refugees camps in Albania, and helped other institutions in Italy and Switzerland to envoy goods using Mabetex's trucks. In the early 2000s, Mabetex withdrew from the Russian market and has since been focussing mainly on the Kazakh construction market.

== Main Projects ==
=== Russia ===
In the early 1990s, the Mabetex Group began working in the Russian city of Yakutsk. From 1994 until 1998, Mabetex was commissioned to renovate the State Duma, Russian Opera House, Kremlin, and the White House in Moscow, the official home of the Russian government. Several floors of the building had been severely damaged in October 1993. Mabetex was asked to completely restore both the exterior and interior of the building. In total, Mabetex earnt US$492 million for the renovation work. The renovation of the Kremlin alone cost US$335 million.

=== Kazakhstan ===
Ak Orda Presidential Palace

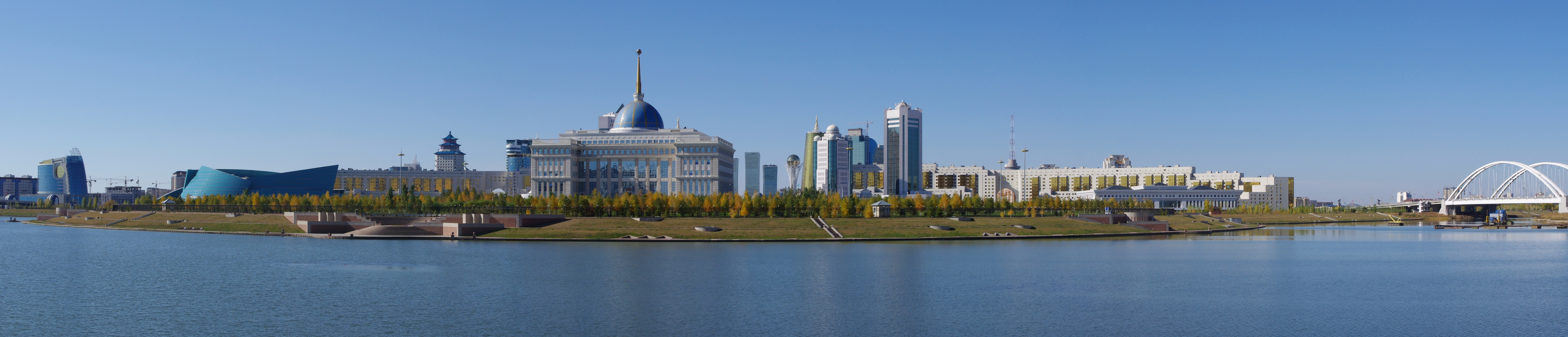
Panoramic view of the Akorda and the Central Concert Hall in Astana

Mabetex has been working in Kazakhstan, where it played an important role in the construction of the capital Astana. The company has, as of 2009, built almost 40% of the buildings in Nur-Sultan, on more than 1,000,000 m^{2} of land. Among them were the new Ak Orda Presidential Palace, located on the left bank of the Ishim River, the ministry of foreign affairs, the concert and theatre hall, the Opera house, a hospital, the Saryarka Velotreck ice-hockey stadium, and the main terminal of the Nursultan Nazarbayev International Airport.

=== Switzerland ===
Mabetex has been active in Switzerland since 1991. The group's first project was the Kazakh embassy building, located in a residential area of Geneva. The building houses several offices and conference rooms. Among other works, Mabetex has completed the Swiss Diamond Hotel, a luxury five-star hotel located in Lugano. Furthermore, Mabetex has reconstructed the five-star hotel Fluela in Davos, and the new Romantica Residence building complex in Melide-Lugano.

=== Kosovo and Albania ===
The Mabetex Group in Kosovo was involved in the reconstruction of the Parliament building. The work carried out included the renovation of the interior and the reconstruction of the exterior with glass facades. In 2021, the group won an EUR 104 million tender for the construction of Albania's new international airport in Vlora.

=== Elsewhere ===
==== Italy ====
In Italy, the Mabetex Group was responsible in the study and project for the refurbishment of the La Fenice theatre in Venice after it was burnt.

==== Uzbekistan ====
In Tashkent, the capital of Uzbekistan, the group constructed the project for the City Hall.

=== Gallery ===
Astana Opera House

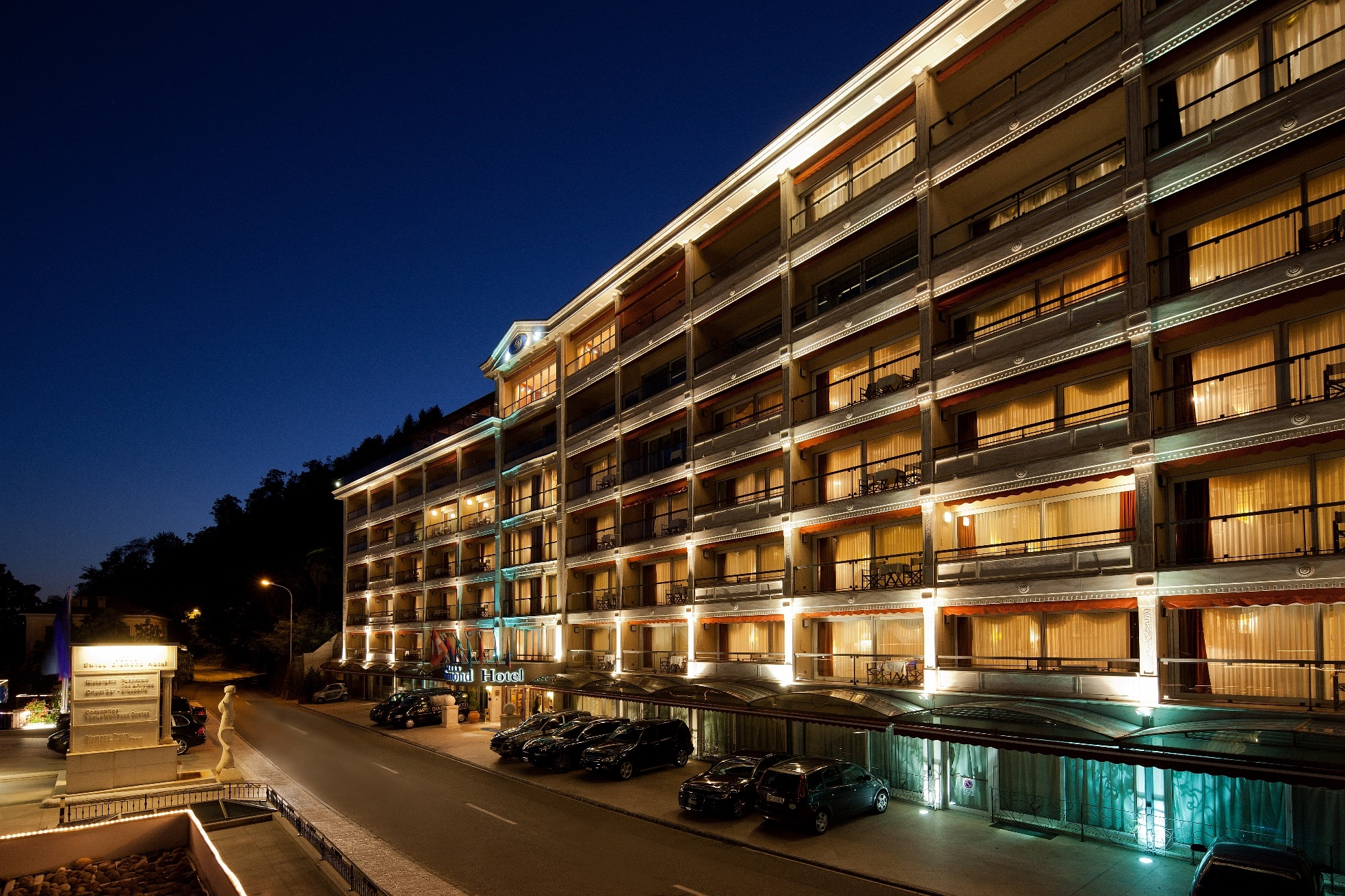
Swiss Diamond Hotel Olivella

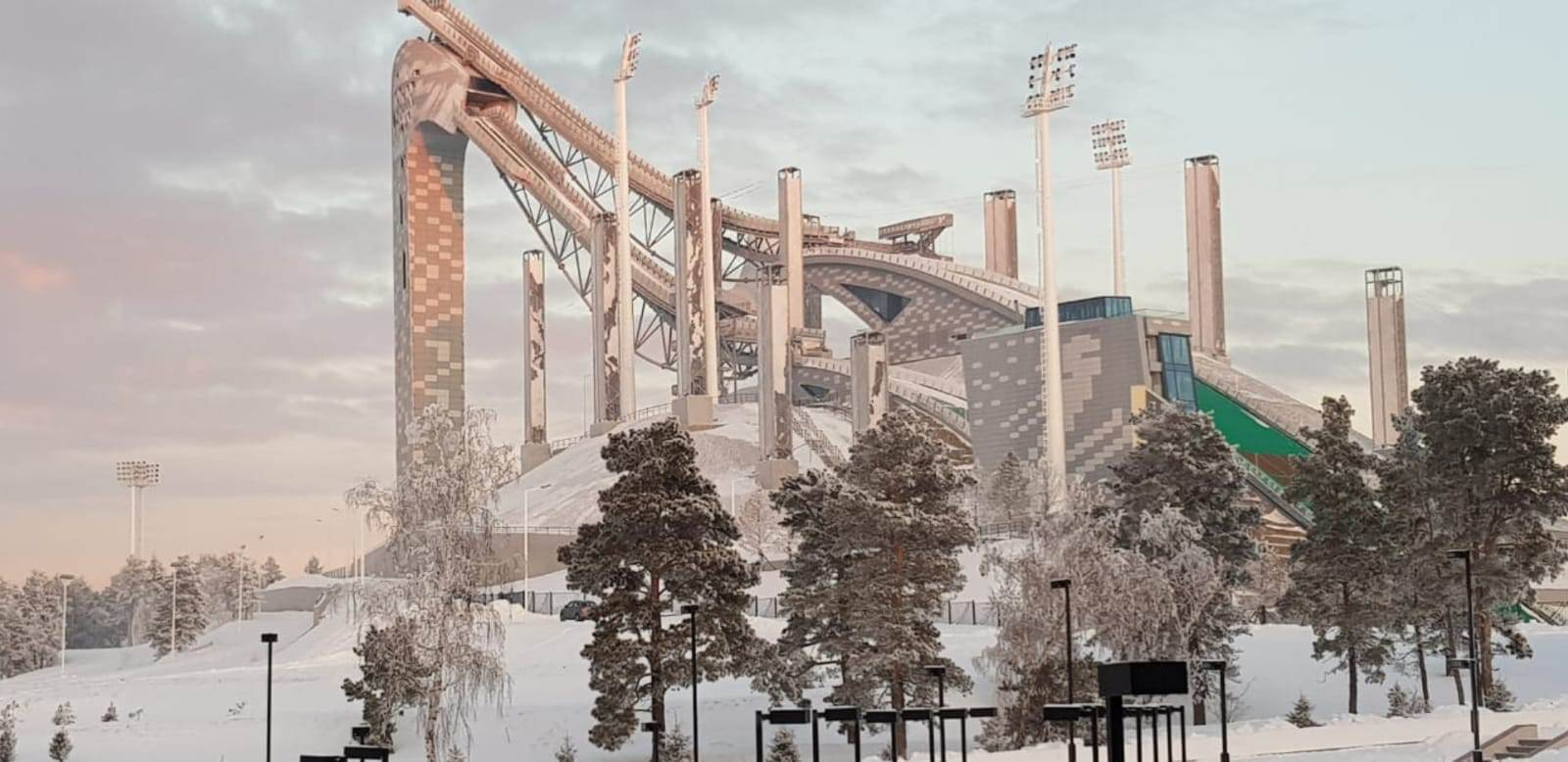
Lyzhnyy Tramplin Burabay ski jumping complex in Shchuchinsk
