= Përparim Rama =

Albanian politician

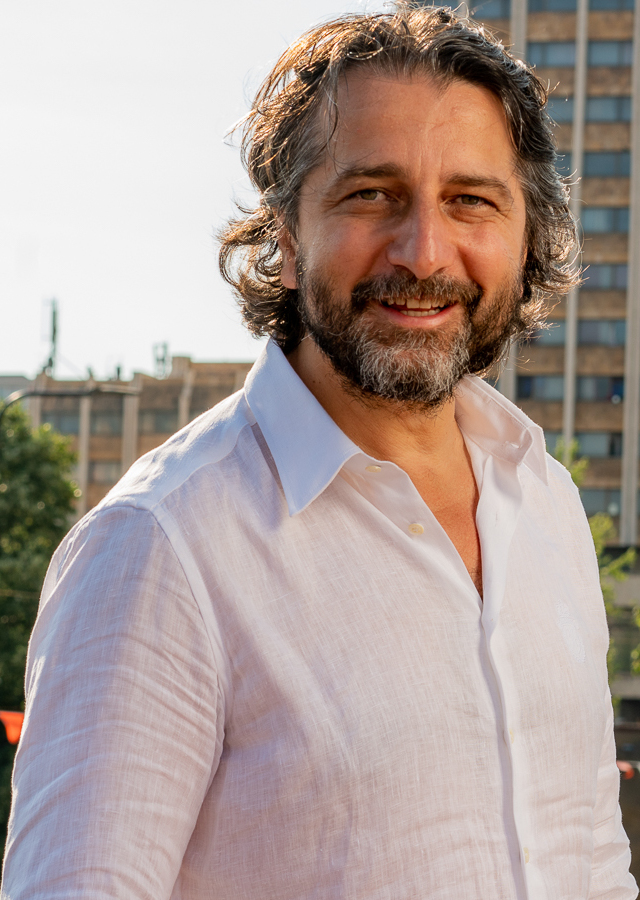

Mayor of Pristina
- Incumbent
- Assumed office 7 December 2021
- Preceded by: Shpend Ahmeti

Personal details
- Born: 20 January 1976 (age 50) Pristina, SAP Kosovo, SFR Yugoslavia (now Kosovo)
- Spouse: Kristale Ivezaj
- Children: 3
- Education: London South Bank University; Royal Institute of British Architects; University of East London

Përparim Rama (born 20 January 1976) is a Kosovo-Albanian architect and urban planner serving as the current Mayor of Pristina since 7 December 2021. His work has been published in London Building Design Magazine and several other international design magazines.

== Biography ==
Përparim Rama was born in Pristina on 20 January 1976. His father was a well-known Albanian painter. In 1992, when he was 16 years old, Përparim Rama moved to Great Britain along with his cousin Iliriana. With the deteriorating political situation between Kosovo and Serbia and the imposition of sanctions by the then Yugoslav state on Kosovo Albanians, all Albanian employees were removed from public office. Rama’s parents, both teachers, remained unemployed. At the time, young men were being recruited by the Yugoslav army to be deployed to the front lines in the war against Croats or Bosniaks. In Great Britain Rama sought asylum, which was granted due to the aggravated political situation in his homeland.

== Education ==
Rama completed his undergraduate studies in architecture (RIBA Part I) at London South Bank University from 1995 to 1998. He continued his education at the University of East London, where he obtained a Graduate Diploma in Architecture and Urbanism (RIBA Part II) between 2001 and 2003. During the same period, he also earned a Master’s degree with Distinction at the Centre for Evolutionary Computing in Architecture and Urbanism at the University of East London. From 2007 to 2009, he pursued doctoral studies at the SMARTlab Media Institute Master and Doctorate Programme, where he also served as a Supervisor for Master’s and Doctoral levels.

Rama is an Associate Member of the Royal Institute of British Architects.

Rama initially worked as a consultant at London Southampton Airport. He also worked as a mentor in the School of Architecture at the University of Nottingham and has supervised Doctorate Candidates in Generative Architecture and SMART building design in the MA and PHD program at the SmartLab Media Institute.

== Career and awards ==
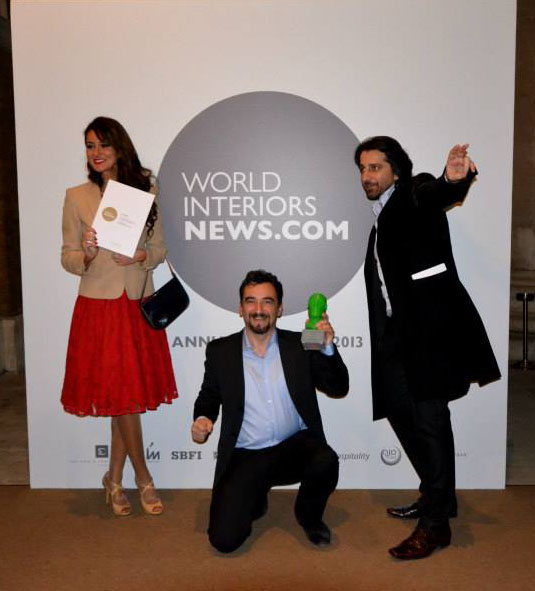
"World Interiors News Annual Award 2013"

In 2012, at the Venice Biennale of Architecture, Rama represented Kosovo for the first time in history with the 'Filigree Maker' Pavilion, which was positively welcomed by the international media and especially by the Biennale President Paulo Barata, who described the project as "Architectural Democracy". Rama was a consultant to the National Research Fund of the State of Qatar on the country’s current and future urban and architectural projects. He is also the leader of the master plan project team for the development of a 10 hectares sustainable village in Dhërmi, on the southeast coast of Albania.

Rama was a specialist advisor for the development of spatial planning tools and architecture in the municipalities of Newham Council and Tower Hamlets in London. He has led the drafting of the regulatory plan for Kosovo's capital, Prishtina. He is a periodic advisor/critic at the University of East London and a Periodic Critic at the Architectural Association of the United Kingdom. Rama and his company have won recognition for their innovative projects. In 2013, Rama and his team won the First Prize in the World Interiors News Annual Award 2013 for the interior design of the Hamam Jazz Bar in Prishtina.

== Projects ==
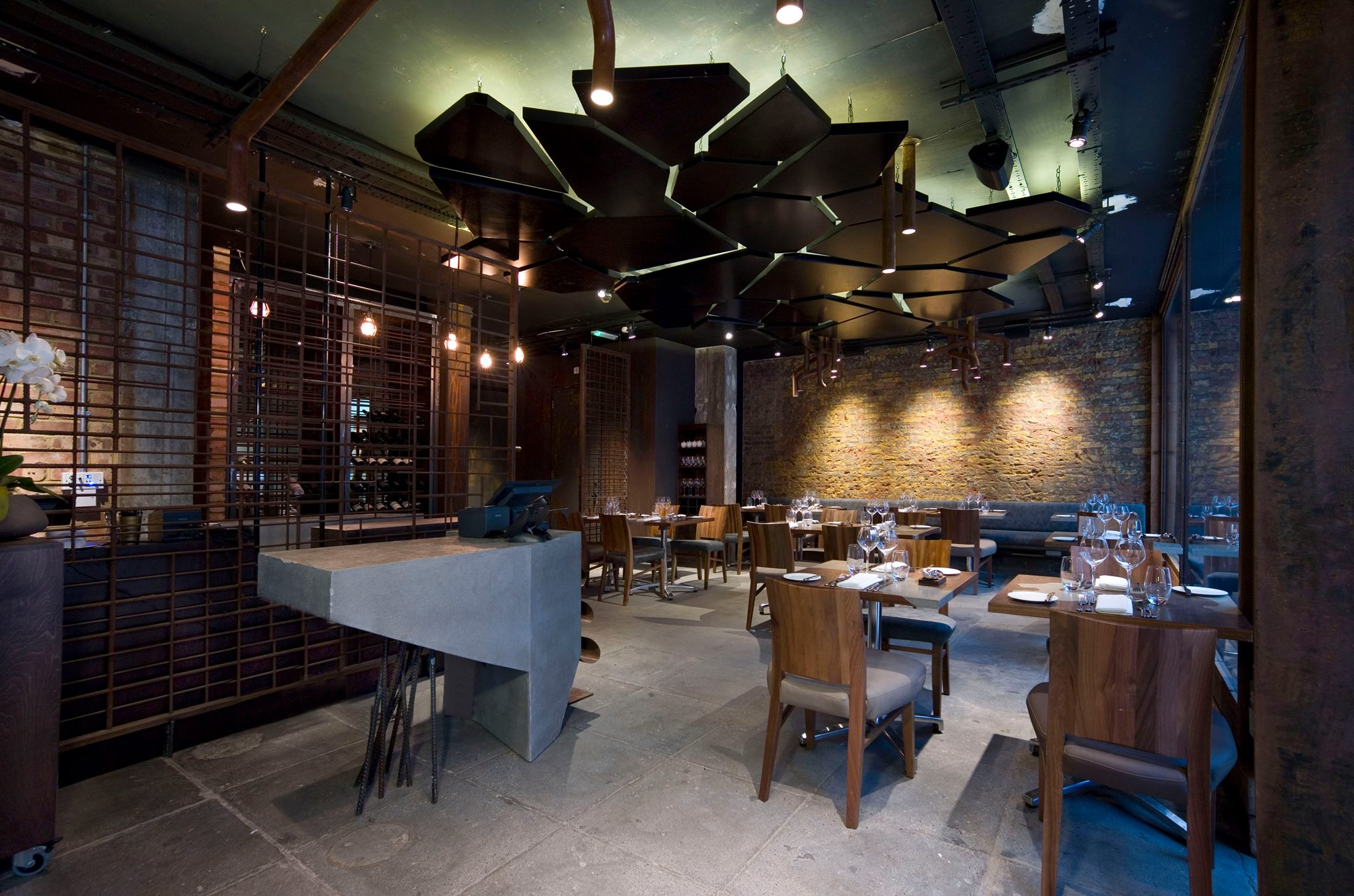
Zebrano in The City, London

In 2017, Rama and his team were assigned to arrange the Oatlands Park Hotel in Surrey, Britain, a facility of historical value, as it is the building where the Great Tudor Palace once stood. The Zebrano in The City restaurant in London was designed by Rama. Zebrano In The City covers 6,000 square feet over two floors and has a fine dining restaurant, a bar and a late-night lounge.

The British-Albanian company 4M Group, with CEO Përparim Rama, was among the finalists for the SBID International Design Awards, an award in the Global Design Calendar. Rama was a jury member of the interior design WIN Awards 2018.

He is the winner of an award for designing coffee places in the "World Interior News" competition within the Saatchi gallery in 2013. He is also known for his involvement in the spatial planning of the 2012 London Olympics, for engaging in building the vision of Doha, the capital of Qatar, for major projects in New York, Dublin, Basel, Prague and Damascus, Syria.

== Mayor of Pristina ==
On a Facebook post, the chairman of the Democratic League of Kosovo, Lumir Abdixhiku announced that Rama will be the candidate with whom the LDK will aim to win back Pristina in the local elections to be held in autumn 2021. Rama won the election and took office on December 7, 2021.

In the 2025 local elections in Kosovo, Rama was re-elected as mayor of Prishtina for another 4 years after the second round of elections.

== Personal life ==
Rama is married to Kristale Ivezaj and they have three children, Arra Serafinë Rama, Tigër Rok Rama and Bron Ndue Rama.
