= Social Democratic Party of Kosovo =

Social Democratic Party of Kosovo Partia Socialdemokrate e Kosovës
- President: Dardan Molliqaj
- Founder: Kaqusha Jashari
- Founded: 10 February 1990; 36 years ago
- Preceded by: League of Communists of Kosovo
- Headquarters: Pristina, Kosovo
- Ideology: Social democracy Pro-Europeanism
- Political position: Centre-left
- Colours: Red
- Assembly: 0 / 120
- Municipality: 0 / 38
- Councillors: 6 / 994

Website
- https://psd-ks.com/

The Social Democratic Party of Kosovo (Albanian: Partia Socialdemokrate e Kosovës, PSD) is a political party in Kosovo.

The party was established on 10 February 1990 by Kaqusha Jashari as the successor party to the former League of Communists of Kosovo, a Serbian provincial branch of the League of Communists of Yugoslavia. Jashari was among the fellow LKK members that were purged during the Anti-bureaucratic revolution in late 1988. It was the second political party to be established in the newly pluralist Kosovo.

== Leadership ==
The current leader of the party is Dardan Molliqaj. He was chosen at the party's meeting on 15 December 2019.

=== Presidents of the Social Democratic Party of Kosovo (1990–present) ===
| # | President | Born–died | Term start | Term end |
|---|---|---|---|---|
| 1 | Shkëlzen Maliqi | 1947– | 10 February 1990 | 1993 |
| 2 | Kaqusha Jashari | 1946–2025 | 1993 | 10 April 2008 |
| 3 | Agim Çeku | 1960– | 10 April 2008 | 16 January 2013 |
| 4 | Majlinda Nushi | 1981– | 23 February 2013 | 9 May 2018 |
| 5 | Shpend Ahmeti | 1978– | 9 May 2018 | 15 December 2019 |
| 6 | Dardan Molliqaj | 1985– | 15 December 2019 | Incumbent |

== In Parliament ==
PSD participated in the elections of 2017 in a coalition with PDK, AAK and Nisma, but failed to get any seat in the parliament. The party was represented in parliament by 12 MP's, who all dissolved into the party from the Group of the Independent Deputies, a group of former members of the Vetëvendosje movement. Dardan Sejdiu was the head of the parliamentary group.

In the elections of 2019, PSD participated as part of a coalition with AAK. PSD did not win any seats and many of its members, including Fisnik Ismaili, Dardan Sejdiu, and former president of the party Shpend Ahmeti resigned and left the party.

== Political position and ideology ==
According to its charter, the PSD is a social-democratic political party, which would position it on the center-left.

In the ongoing Arab-Israeli conflict, PSD position themselves as Pro-Palestinian & describe Israel on their website, as a "colonialist" & "terror state".

== Election results ==
=== Parliamentary elections ===
| Year | Leader | Votes | % votes | Seats | +/– | Government status |
|---|---|---|---|---|---|---|
| 1992 | Shkëlzen Maliqi | 6,064 | 0.81% | 0 / 140 | New | Extra-parliamentary |
| 2001 | Kaqusha Jashari | 1,785 | 0.23% | 0 / 120 | 0 | Extra-parliamentary |
| 2004 | Kaqusha Jashari | 2,107 | 0.31% | 0 / 120 | 0 | Extra-parliamentary |
| 2007 | Did not contest | | | 0 / 120 | 0 | Extra-parliamentary |
| 2010 | Agim Çeku | In AKR-led coalition | | 0 / 120 | 0 | Extra-parliamentary |
| 2014 | Did not contest | | | 0 / 120 | 0 | Extra-parliamentary |
| 2017 | Majlinda Nushi | In PAN Coalition | | 0 / 120 | 0 | Extra-parliamentary |
| 2019 | Shpend Ahmeti | In 100% Kosovo | | 0 / 120 | 0 | Extra-parliamentary |
| 2021 | Did not contest | | | 0 / 120 | 0 | Extra-parliamentary |
| Feb 2025 | Did not contest | | | 0 / 120 | 0 | Extra-parliamentary |
| Dec 2025 | Did not contest | | | 0 / 120 | 0 | Extra-parliamentary |
| 2026 | Dardan Molliqaj | 2,084 | 0.26% | 0 / 120 | 0 | Extra-parliamentary |
