= Gjilan Assembly =

Local government in Kosovo

Gjilan Assembly Asambleja e Gjilanit
- 6th Gjilan Assembly

Type
- Type: Unicameral
- Term limits: no limits

Leadership
- Chairman of the Assembly: Shpresa Kurteshi, LDK since 3 November 2013
- Mayor: Lutfi Haziri

Structure
- Seats: 35
- Political groups: Government: LDK : 14 seats; AAK: 4 seats
- Political groups: Opposition: PDK: 7 seats; Vetëvendosje!: 4 seats; Vatra: 1 seats; PD: 1 seats; LR: 1 seats; AKR: 1 seats; KDTP: 1 seats; ZEP: 1 seats; Independent: 1 seats
- Committees: 11 Comites

Elections
- First election: 2000
- Last election: 3 November 2013
- Next election: 22 October 2017

Meeting place
- Gjilan Assembly

Website
- https://kk.rks-gov.net/gjilan/

The Municipal Assembly is the highest authority in the municipality, which is directly elected by the citizens, in accordance with the law on local elections. The Municipal Assembly of Gjilan has 35 members.
Commune's powers and duties are exercised by the Municipal Assembly and its organs, unless otherwise provided by this Statute.
All members of the Municipal Assembly have equal and equal rights and opportunities to participate fully in the Assembly processes. The Municipal Assembly ensures that these rights and opportunities are included in its Statute and Rules of Procedure.

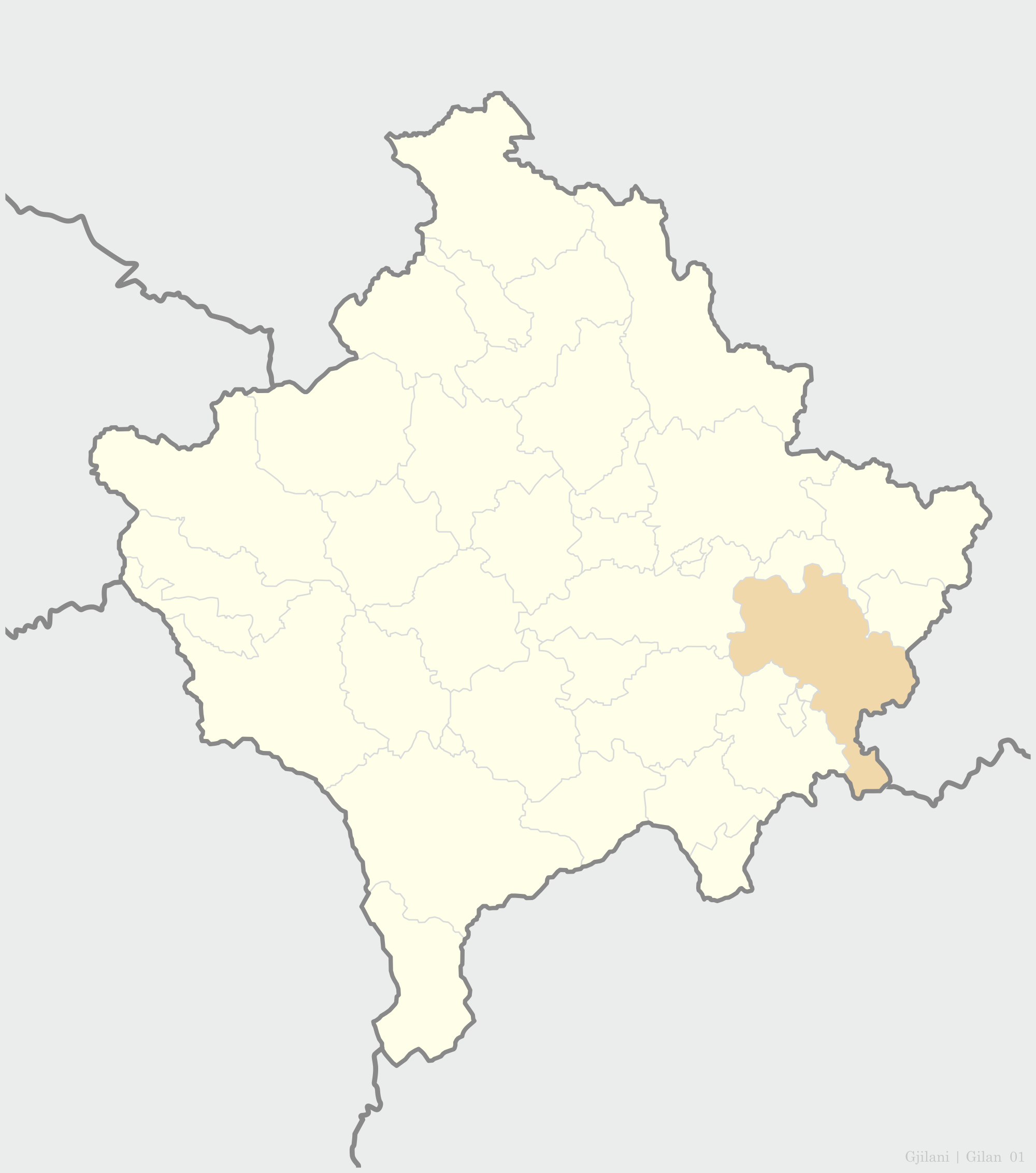
Map of municipality of Gjilan

== Committees ==
The Gjilan Assembly has 11 committees

- Committee for Politics and Finance
- Committee for Communities
- Committee for Health
- Committee for Education
- Committee for Economic and Agri-culture
- Committee for Urban planning and environmental protection
- Committee for Public Services, Housing, Protection and Rescue
- Committee for Culture, Youth and Sports
- Committee for Geodesy, Cadastre and Property
- Committee for Cross-border Cooperation
- Committee for Gender equality
- Committee for Spatial Planning
