= 2017 Kosovan local elections =

Local elections were held in Kosovo on 22 October 2017. Only 19 municipalities elected a mayor in the first round, and 19 voted again on 19 November 2017.

== Electoral system ==
The Mayor and the members of the Assembly were elected by open list proportional representation, with seats reserved for national minorities, in each Kosovo municipalities

== Parties and coalitions ==
Kosovo municipalities

The Central Election Commission had certified for municipal elections on October 22, 91 political subjects, of which 35 political parties, one coalition, 30 civic initiatives and 25 independent candidates.

The results of round 1

== Elected mayors ==
Municipalities	Elected mayor	Party
Deçan	Bashkim Ramosaj	AAK
Dragash	Shaban Shabani	PDK
Drenas	Ramiz Lladrovci	PDK
Ferizaj	Agim Aliu	PDK
Gjakova	Ardian Gjini	AAK
Gjilan	Lutfi Haziri	LDK
Gračanica	Srđan Popović	SL
Elez Han	Rufki Suma	Independent
Istog	Haki Rugova	LDK
Junik	Agron Kuçi	AAK
Kaçanik	Besim Ilazi	PDK
Kamenicë	Qëndron Kastrati	VV
Klina	Zenun Elezaj	AAK
Klokot	Božidar Dejanović	Gi Klokot-Vrbovac
Kosovo Polje	Burim Berisha	LDK
Leposavić	Zoran Todić	SL
Lipjan	Imri Ahmeti	LDK
Malishevë	Ragip Begaj	NISMA
Mamuša	Abdülhadi Krasniç	KDTP
Mitrovica	Agim Bahtiri	AKR
North Mitrovica	Goran Rakić	SL
Novo Brdo	Svetislav Ivanović	SL
Obilić	Xhafer Gashi	AAK
Rahovec	Smajl Latifi	AAK
Parteš	Dragan Petkovic	SL
Peja	Gazmend Muhaxheri	LDK
Pristina	Shpend Ahmeti	VV
Prizren	Mytaher Haskuka	VV
Podujevë	Agim Veliu	LDK
Ranilug	Vladica Aritonović	SL
Skenderaj	Bekim Jashari	Independent
Štrpce	Bratislav Nikolić	SL
Shtime	Naim Ismajli	PDK
Suva Reka	Bali Muharremi	AAK
Vitina	Sokol Haliti	LDK
Vushtrri	Xhafer Tahiri	LDK
Zubin Potok	Stevan Vulović	SL
Zvečan	Vučina Janković	SL

Party	Municipalities
SL	9
LDK	8
AAK	7
PDK	5
VV	3
AKR	1
NISMA	1

== Election results ==
=== Pristina ===
Candidate for Mayor	Party	Result	Votes
Shpend Ahmeti	Vetëvendosje!	43,32%	37,572
Arban Abrashi	Democratic League of Kosovo	35,89%	31,126
Selim Pacolli	New Kosovo Alliance	10,40%	9,022
Lirak Çelaj	Democratic Party of Kosovo	5,86%	5,086
Arber Vllahiu	Alliance for the Future of Kosovo	3,23%	2,800
Shyqiri Bytyqi	Initiative for Kosovo	0,70%	605
Rifat Deri	The Alternative (Kosovo)	0,30%	262
Avni Çamaku	Partia Fjala	0,29%	255

=== Prizren ===
Candidate for Mayor	Party	Results	Votes
Shaqir Totaj	Democratic Party of Kosovo	29,64%	19,340
Mytaher Haskuka	Vetëvendosje!	22,36%	14,590
Hatim Baxhaku	Democratic League of Kosovo	19,72%	12,865
Lulzim Kabashi	Alliance for the Future of Kosovo	8,51%	5,555
Zafir Berisha	Initiative for Kosovo	8,16%	5,327
Sencar Karamuço	Turkish Democratic Party of Kosovo	5,57%	3,637
Emilja Redzepi	Nova Demokratska Stranka	4,55%	2,969
Osman Krasniqi	New Kosovo Alliance	0,64%	416
Nexhmedin Ramadani	Partia Fjala	0,53%	344
Veton Qipa	The Alternative (Kosovo)	0,31%	199

=== Ferizaj ===
Candidate for Mayor	Party	Results	Votes
Agim Aliu	Democratic Party of Kosovo	39,18%	19.263
Muharrem Sfarqa	Democratic League of Kosovo	30,00%	14,748
Faton Topalli	Vetëvendosje!	22,20%	10,916
Xhavit Zariqi	Alliance for the Future of Kosovo	4,56%	2,240
Amir Rexhepi	New Kosovo Alliance	1,61%	790
Ćazim Rahmani	Ashkali Party for Integration	1,08%	531
Besnik Berisha	Initiative for Kosovo	0,84%	411
Bashkim Fazliu	Civic initiatives for Ferizaj	0,54%	264

=== Gjilan ===
Candidate for Mayor	Party	Result	Votes
Lutfi Haziri	Democratic League of Kosovo	43,40%	19,543
Sami Kurteshi	Vetëvendosje!	27,34%	12,310
Zenun Pajaziti	Democratic Party of Kosovo	18,57%	8,359
Rexhep Kadriu	Alliance for the Future of Kosovo	8,55%	3,850
Bajram Hasani	Initiative for Kosovo	1,48%	665
Naser Morina	Justice Party (Kosovo)	0,66%	298

=== Podujevë ===
Candidate for Mayor	Party	Results	Votes
Agim Veliu	Lidhja Demokratike e Kosovës	48,15%	18,872
Ajet Potera	Vetëvendosje	29,77%	11,671
Hajredin Hyseni	Partia Demokratike e Kosovës	18,16%	7,120
Fatmir Humolli	Aleanca për Ardhmërinë e Kosovës	2,48%	971
Xhevdet Maloku	Fjala	0,82%	322
Xhemajl Hasani	Nisma	0,62%	242

=== Gjakova District ===
==== Gjakova ====
Mayoral results (first round)
Candidate	Party	Votes	%
Ardian Gjini	Alliance for the Future of Kosovo	17,219	39.88
Mimoza Kusari Lila (incumbent)	The Alternative	13,860	32.10
Driton Çaushi	Levizja Vetëvendosje!	5,557	12.87
Ramadan Hoti	Democratic Party of Kosovo	3,506	8.12
Bekim Ermeni	Democratic League of Kosovo	1,582	3.66
Fazli Hoxha	Initiative for Kosovo	986	2.28
Edmond Dushi	New Kosovo Alliance	463	1.07
Total		43,173	100.00

Municipal assembly results
Party	Votes	%	Seats
Alliance for the Future of Kosovo	10,148	25.19	9
The Alternative	6,796	16.87	6
Democratic Party of Kosovo	5,714	14.18	5
Levizja Vetëvendosje!	5,363	13.31	5
Democratic League of Kosovo	3,896	9.67	4
Albanian Christian Democratic Party of Kosovo	3,892	9.66	3
Initiative for Kosovo	1,893	4.70	2
New Kosovo Alliance	1,330	3.30	1
Egyptian Liberal Party	434	1.08	–
New Democratic Initiative of Kosovo	368	0.91	–
Justice Party	285	0.71	–
The Word	99	0.25	–
Organization of the Democratic National Front	64	0.16	–
Total	40,282	100.00	35

==== Deçan ====
Mayoral results
Candidate	Party	Votes	%
Bashkim Ramosaj	Alliance for the Future of Kosovo	10,434	64.26
Mal Lokaj	Democratic League of Kosovo	2,636	16.23
Zekë Sinanaj	Levizja Vetëvendosje!	2,133	13.14
Blerand Kadrijaj	Democratic Party of Kosovo	938	5.78
Shkodran Imeraj	Initiative for Kosovo	97	0.60
Total		16,238	100.00

Municipal assembly results
Party	Votes	%	Seats
Alliance for the Future of Kosovo	9,119	59.68	17
Democratic League of Kosovo	2,717	17.78	5
Democratic Party of Kosovo	1,606	10.51	3
Levizja Vetëvendosje!	1,378	9.02	2
New Kosovo Alliance	250	1.64	–
Initiative for Kosovo	153	1.00	–
National Front of Kosovo	56	0.37	–
Total	15,279	100.00	27

==== Junik ====
Mayoral results
Candidate	Party	Votes	%
Agron Kuçi (incumbent)	Alliance for the Future of Kosovo	1,499	57.88
Tahir Isufaj	Democratic League of Kosovo	617	23.82
Sylë Gaxherri	Levizja Vetëvendosje!	307	11.85
Fatos Shala	Democratic Party of Kosovo	167	6.45
Total		2,590	100.00

Municipal assembly results
Party	Votes	%	Seats
Alliance for the Future of Kosovo	1,080	43.43	7
Democratic League of Kosovo	789	31.72	5
Levizja Vetëvendosje!	381	15.32	2
Democratic Party of Kosovo	237	9.53	1
Total	2,487	100.00	15

==== Rahovec ====
Mayoral results (first round)
Candidate	Party	Votes	%
Smajl Latifi	Alliance for the Future of Kosovo	7,766	33.50
Idriz Vehapi (incumbent)	Democratic Party of Kosovo	6,837	29.50
Ibrahim Kryeziu	Democratic League of Kosovo	4,768	20.57
Visar Korenica	Levizja Vetëvendosje!	3,513	15.16
Besnik Hoti	Initiative for Kosovo	295	1.27
Total		23,179	100.00

Municipal assembly results
Party	Votes	%	Seats
Democratic Party of Kosovo	6,378	29.15	9
Alliance for the Future of Kosovo	5,231	23.91	7
Democratic League of Kosovo	4,873	22.27	7
Levizja Vetëvendosje!	2,930	13.39	4
Initiative for Kosovo	678	3.10	1
New Kosovo Alliance	544	2.49	1
Civic Initiative "Civic Initiative for Justice and Unity"	445	2.03	1
Serb List	384	1.76	1
Movement for Unification	299	1.37	–
The Word	118	0.54	–
Total	21,880	100.00	31

=== Mitrovica District ===
==== Mitrovica ====
===== South Mitrovica =====
Mayoral results (first round)
Candidate	Party	Votes	%
Valdete Idrizi	Democratic Party of Kosovo	9,013	29.63
Agim Bahtiri (incumbent)	New Kosovo Alliance	8,222	27.03
Safet Kamberi	Democratic League of Kosovo	6,588	21.66
Fehmi Ferati	Levizja Vetëvendosje!	4,766	15.67
Esat Peci	Alliance for the Future of Kosovo	579	1.90
Qazim Shala	Initiative for Kosovo	348	1.14
Basri Brahimi	Independent	328	1.08
Fisnik Gjinaj	Independent	210	0.69
Mehmet Mehmeti	The Alternative	181	0.60
Nyset Pretini	The Word	180	0.59
Total		30,415	100.00

Municipal assembly results
Party	Votes	%	Seats
Democratic Party of Kosovo	8,253	29.00	11
Democratic League of Kosovo	5,761	20.24	7
New Kosovo Alliance	5,001	17.57	7
Levizja Vetëvendosje!	4,820	16.93	6
Alliance for the Future of Kosovo	1,604	5.64	2
Initiative for Kosovo	1,037	3.64	1
Justice Party	864	3.04	1
The Alternative	343	1.21	–
Turkish Democratic Party of Kosovo	325	1.14	–
The Word	222	0.78	–
Partia Ura	122	0.43	–
Salih Meha	111	0.39	–
Total	28,463	100.00	35

===== North Mitrovica =====
Mayoral results
Candidate	Party	Votes	%
Goran Rakić (incumbent)	Serb List	5,372	67.45
Oliver Ivanović	Civic Initiative "SDP - Oliver Ivanović"	1,475	18.52
Gonxhe Çaushi	Democratic Party of Kosovo	763	9.58
Betim Osmani	New Kosovo Alliance	354	4.45
Total		7,964	100.00

Municipal assembly results
Party	Votes	%	Seats
Serb List	4,918	67.14	14
Civic Initiative "SDP - Oliver Ivanović"	1,051	14.35	3
Democratic Party of Kosovo	598	8.16	2
Levizja Vetëvendosje!	171	2.33	–
Democratic League of Kosovo	156	2.13	–
Vakat Coalition	152	2.08	–
Alliance for the Future of Kosovo	125	1.71	–
New Kosovo Alliance	109	1.49	–
Partia Ura	45	0.61	–
Total	7,325	100.00	19

==== Leposavić ====
Mayoral results
Candidate	Party	Votes	%
Zoran Todić	Serb List	5,105	63.20
Dragan Jablanović (incumbent)	Party of Kosovo Serbs	2,807	34.75
Nenad Radosavljević	Civic Initiative "People's Justice"	166	2.05
Total		8,078	100.00

Municipal assembly results
Party	Votes	%	Seats
Serb List	4,158	56.27	12
Party of Kosovo Serbs	2,111	28.57	6
Civic Initiative "Democratic Initiative"	343	4.64	1
Initiative for Kosovo	164	2.22	–
Civic Initiative "SDP – Oliver Ivanović"	162	2.19	–
Levizja Vetëvendosje!	98	1.33	–
Civic Initiative "Citizens' Initiative Together"	98	1.33	–
Civic Initiative "Equal for All"	89	1.20	–
Civic Initiative "People's Justice"	79	1.07	–
Democratic Party of Kosovo	62	0.84	–
New Kosovo Alliance	20	0.27	–
Alliance for the Future of Kosovo	6	0.08	–
Total	7,390	100.00	19

==== Skenderaj ====
Mayoral results
Candidate	Party	Votes	%
Bekim Jashari	Independent	13,982	85.52
Musa Dervishaj	New Kosovo Alliance	1,474	9.02
Hysni Mehani	Levizja Vetëvendosje!	529	3.24
Isa Fejzullahi	Democratic League of Kosovo	365	2.23
Total		16,350	100.00

Municipal assembly results
Party	Votes	%	Seats
Democratic Party of Kosovo	9,746	62.12	20
New Kosovo Alliance	1,576	10.05	3
Civic Initiative "Forty-One Thousand"	909	5.79	2
Levizja Vetëvendosje!	892	5.69	2
Alliance for the Future of Kosovo	714	4.55	1
Democratic League of Kosovo	476	3.03	1
The Word	364	2.32	1
Initiative for Kosovo	288	1.84	1
Justice Party	239	1.52	–
Adem Beqiri	204	1.30	–
Bekim Ibishi	176	1.12	–
Civic Initiative "SDP - Oliver Ivanović"	104	0.66	–
Total	15,688	100.00	31

==== Vushtrri ====
Mayoral results (first round)
Candidate	Party	Votes	%
Ferit Idrizi	Democratic Party of Kosovo	10,184	33.29
Xhafer Tahiri	Democratic League of Kosovo	7,842	25.64
Besim Muzaqi	Levizja Vetëvendosje!	7,679	25.10
Nasuf Aliu	New Kosovo Alliance	2,442	7.98
Lutfi Bilalli	Alliance for the Future of Kosovo	1,591	5.20
Abdullah Vojvoda	Initiative for Kosovo	852	2.79
Total		30,590	100.00

Municipal assembly results
Party	Votes	%	Seats
Democratic Party of Kosovo	8,870	30.74	11
Levizja Vetëvendosje!	5,800	20.10	7
Democratic League of Kosovo	5,302	18.38	6
Alliance for the Future of Kosovo	2,277	7.89	3
New Kosovo Alliance	2,249	7.79	3
Movement for Unification	1,234	4.28	2
Initiative for Kosovo	1,124	3.90	1
Serb List	675	2.34	1
Justice Party	534	1.85	1
Turkish Democratic Party of Kosovo	273	0.95	–
The Alternative	271	0.94	–
Independent Liberal Party	156	0.54	–
The Word	87	0.30	–
Total	28,852	100.00	35

==== Zubin Potok ====
Mayoral results
Candidate	Party	Votes	%
Stevan Vulović (incumbent)	Serb List	2,691	79.85
Slaviša Biševac	Civic Initiative "For Zubin Potok"	679	20.15
Total		3,370	100.00

Municipal assembly results
Party	Votes	%	Seats
Serb List	2,445	71.76	13
Civic Initiative "For Zubin Potok"	408	11.98	2
Democratic League of Kosovo	285	8.37	2
Democratic Party of Kosovo	142	4.17	1
Levizja Vetëvendosje!	127	3.73	1
Total	3,407	100.00	19

==== Zvečan ====
Mayoral results
Candidate	Party	Votes	%
Vučina Janković (incumbent)	Serb List	2,863	70.59
Dragiša Milović	Civic Initiative "For Our Zvečan"	1,193	29.41
Total		4,056	100.00

Municipal assembly results
Party	Votes	%	Seats
Serb List	2,601	69.30	13
Civic Initiative "For Our Zvečan"	911	24.27	5
Levizja Vetëvendosje!	100	2.66	1
Democratic League of Kosovo	94	2.50	–
Democratic Party of Kosovo	47	1.25	–
Total	3,753	100.00	19

=== Peja District ===
==== Peja ====
Mayoral results
Candidate	Party	Votes	%
Gazmend Muhaxheri (incumbent)	Democratic League of Kosovo	22,014	50.23
Fatmir Gashi	Alliance for the Future of Kosovo	13,980	31.90
Sabiha Shala	Democratic Party of Kosovo	4,105	9.37
Bashkim Nurboja	Levizja Vetëvendosje!	2,822	6.44
Sali Kelmendi	Initiative for Kosovo	391	0.89
Reshat Nurboja	The Alternative	286	0.65
Eneida Kelmendi	The Word	226	0.52
Total		43,824	100.00

Municipal assembly results
Party	Votes	%	Seats
Democratic League of Kosovo	16,385	39.39	15
Alliance for the Future of Kosovo	11,440	27.50	10
Democratic Party of Kosovo	5,376	12.92	5
Levizja Vetëvendosje!	3,582	8.61	3
The Alternative	912	2.19	1
Initiative for Kosovo	899	2.16	1
New Kosovo Alliance	520	1.25	–
Party of Democratic Action	488	1.17	–
Egyptian Liberal Party	435	1.05	–
Serb List	412	0.99	–
Vakat Coalition	347	0.83	–
New Democratic Party	336	0.81	–
The Word	219	0.53	–
Ecological Party of Kosovo	155	0.37	–
Social Democratic Party	92	0.22	–
Total	41,598	100.00	35

==== Istog ====
Mayoral results (first round)
Candidate	Party	Votes	%
Haki Rugova (incumbent)	Democratic League of Kosovo	8,872	45.36
Gani Dreshaj	Alliance for the Future of Kosovo	6,970	35.63
Beqir Sadikaj	Democratic Party of Kosovo	1,644	8.40
Agron Avdijaj	Levizja Vetëvendosje!	1,591	8.13
Arif Elshani	Civic Initiative "Independent Initiative of Istog"	484	2.47
Total		19,561	100.00

Municipal assembly results
Party	Votes	%	Seats
Democratic League of Kosovo	7,317	38.18	11
Alliance for the Future of Kosovo	4,096	21.38	6
Democratic Party of Kosovo	2,782	14.52	4
Levizja Vetëvendosje!	1,712	8.93	2
Civic Initiative "Independent Initiative of Istog"	862	4.50	1
Serb List	636	3.32	1
Slaviša Maliković	419	2.19	1
Radenko Belošević	405	2.11	1
Initiative for Kosovo	335	1.75	–
Party of Democratic Action	229	1.20	–
Egyptian Liberal Party	166	0.87	–
Vakat Coalition	102	0.53	–
The Word	56	0.29	–
Civic Initiative "SDP – Oliver Ivanović"	45	0.23	–
Total	19,162	100.00	27

==== Klina ====
Mayoral results (first round)
Candidate	Party	Votes	%
Sokol Bashota (incumbent)	Democratic Party of Kosovo	6,816	37.76
Zenun Elezaj	Alliance for the Future of Kosovo	4,594	25.45
Besim Hoti	Democratic League of Kosovo	4,211	23.33
Iber Elezaj	Levizja Vetëvendosje!	1,306	7.23
Nezir Gashi	Initiative for Kosovo	763	4.23
Avni Gashi	New Kosovo Alliance	363	2.01
Total		18,053	100.00

Municipal assembly results
Party	Votes	%	Seats
Democratic Party of Kosovo	6,032	34.96	10
Democratic League of Kosovo	3,414	19.79	6
Alliance for the Future of Kosovo	3,180	18.43	5
Levizja Vetëvendosje!	1,342	7.78	2
Initiative for Kosovo	796	4.61	1
Civic Initiative "Initiative for the Advancement of Klina"	766	4.44	1
New Kosovo Alliance	435	2.52	1
Albanian Christian Democratic Party of Kosovo	430	2.49	1
Serb List	290	1.68	–
Egyptian Liberal Party	284	1.65	–
Bojan Saičić	274	1.59	–
The Word	12	0.07	–
Total	17,255	100.00	27

== Second round ==
=== Pristina ===
Candidate for Mayor	Party	Result	Votes
Shpend Ahmeti	Vetëvendosje!	50,14%	41.401
Arban Abrashi	Democratic League of Kosovo	49,86%	41.164

=== Prizren ===
Candidate for Mayor	Party	Results	Votes
Mytaher Haskuka	Vetëvendosje!	50,32%	25.509
Shaqir Totaj	Democratic Party of Kosovo	49,68%	25.180

=== Ferizaj ===
Candidate for Mayor	Party	Results	Votes
Agim Aliu	Democratic Party of Kosovo	56,17%	24,142
Muharrem Sfarqa	Democratic League of Kosovo	43,83%	18,841

=== Gjilan ===
Candidate for Mayor	Party	Result	Votes
Lutfi Haziri	Democratic League of Kosovo	63,97%	21.067
Sami Kurteshi	Vetëvendosje!	36,03%	11.867

=== Podujevë ===
Candidate for Mayor	Party	Result	Votes
Agim Veliu	Democratic League of Kosovo	63,78%	20.027
Ajet Potera	Vetëvendosje!	36,22%	11.373

=== Gjakova ===
Mayoral results (second round)
Candidate	Party	Votes	%
Ardian Gjini	Alliance for the Future of Kosovo	21,999	53.46
Mimoza Kusari Lila (incumbent)	The Alternative	19,152	46.54
Total		41,151	100.00

=== Istog ===
The second-round vote took place twice in Istog. Gani Dreshaj was initially declared the winner over incumbent mayor Haki Rugova; Rugova had held a lead until the postal votes went overwhelmingly in Dreshaj's favour. Rugova contended that the postal votes were manipulated by organized crime and challenged the result. A re-vote was ordered for December 2017, and Rugova was narrowly re-elected.

Mayoral results (second round)
Candidate	Party	Votes	%
Haki Rugova (incumbent)	Democratic League of Kosovo	10,033	50.03
Gani Dreshaj	Alliance for the Future of Kosovo	10,019	49.97
Total		20,052	100.00
Registered voters/turnout			–

=== Klina ===
Mayoral results (second round)
Candidate	Party	Votes	%
Zenun Elezaj	Alliance for the Future of Kosovo	8,397	51.62
Sokol Bashota (incumbent)	Democratic Party of Kosovo	7,869	48.38
Total		16,266	100.00

=== South Mitrovica ===
Mayoral results (second round)
Candidate	Party	Votes	%
Agim Bahtiri (incumbent)	New Kosovo Alliance	16,233	57.33
Valdete Idrizi	Democratic Party of Kosovo	12,084	42.67
Total		28,317	100.00

Agim Bahtiri left the New Kosovo Alliance in 2019 and joined Vetëvendosje.

=== Rahovec ===
Mayoral results (second round)
Candidate	Party	Votes	%
Smajl Latifi	Alliance for the Future of Kosovo	10,561	50.70
Idriz Vehapi (incumbent)	Democratic Party of Kosovo	10,271	49.30
Total		20,832	100.00

=== Vushtrri ===
Mayoral results (second round)
Candidate	Party	Votes	%
Xhafer Tahiri	Democratic League of Kosovo	15,122	54.24
Ferit Idrizi	Democratic Party of Kosovo	12,758	45.76
Total		27,880	100.00
