= AIIS =

AIIS may refer to:

- Albanian Institute for International Studies
- American Institute of Indian Studies
- Anterior inferior iliac spine
