= Smajl Latifi =

Kosovan politician

Smajl Latifi (born 9 October 1971) is a politician in Kosovo. He served in the Assembly of Kosovo from 2001 to 2004 as a member of the National Movement for the Liberation of Kosovo (LKÇK), which he later led from 2005 to 2008. He has been a member of the Alliance for the Future of Kosovo (AAK) since 2009 and is currently serving his third term as mayor of Rahovec.

== Early life and career ==
Latifi was born to an Albanian family in the village of Ratkoc in the municipality of Rahovec, in what was then the Socialist Autonomous Province of Kosovo in the Socialist Republic of Serbia, Socialist Federal Republic of Yugoslavia. He attended the University of Pristina's Faculty of Mathematical and Natural Sciences, earning a degree in chemistry. He joined the left-wing nationalist People's Movement for the Republic of Kosovo as a student, and in 1993 he became a founding member of the LKÇK, which also followed a left-nationalist ideology. He was imprisoned by Serbian authorities in the 1990s.

== Kosovo War (1998–99) ==
Latifi was a member of the Kosovo Liberation Army (KLA) during the Kosovo War, becoming commander of the third battalion of the 124th "Gani Paçarizi" brigade. He was wounded in battle at the village of Fortesë in July 1998. During the NATO bombing of Yugoslavia in 1999, he provided reports of the conflict for Albanian television.

== Politician ==
=== National Movement for the Liberation of Kosovo ===
The National Movement for the Liberation of Kosovo won a single seat in the 2001 Kosovan parliamentary election, which went to party leader Fatmir Humolli. Humolli resigned his seat soon after the election, and Latifi took his place in the legislature. He served for the next three years as a member of the opposition. The LKÇK boycotted the 2004 parliamentary election, and he was not a candidate that year.

Latifi became the leader of the LKÇK in 2005. In this role, he was an advocate for the unification of Kosovo and Albania. In an August 2005 interview, he opposed Kosovo's decentralization process on the grounds that it would keep Serb enclaves separate from the rest of Kosovo. He was quoted as saying, "At a time when Serb enclaves [...] are organized as Serbia's authorities and at a time when the risk of formal separation of the country is evident, decentralization presents a real obstacle to the realization of Kosova's independence." He also called on Albanian intellectuals to develop a framework of national unification. He later criticized the international community for compromising what he described as "Albanians' right to decide on their future."

He took part in protests against United Nations–sponsored talks on the status of Kosovo in 2006, arguing that the process would not lead to Kosovo's independence. He was quoted as saying, "The status of the Albanian people, Kosova's status was determined in the liberation war; it was sealed with the blood of our fighters, the blood of our war heroes." He opposed the Ahtisaari Plan in February 2007 on the grounds that it did not mention independence.

Latifi's support for Kosovo's independence was predicated on the notion that it would be a transitional process leading to unification with Albania. During the buildup to Kosovo's unilateral declaration of independence after the Ahtisaari process, he said, "We stand for the national unification option, and we are not focused on independence. If it had been full and unconditional independence, then perhaps we would have supported it, but not in this manner."

All parliamentary elections in Kosovo since 2007 have been held under open list proportional representation. Latifi appeared in the first position on the LKÇK's electoral list in the 2007 Kosovan parliamentary election and finished first among the party's candidates; the party did not, however, cross the electoral threshold to win representation in the assembly. He also ran for mayor of Rahovec in the concurrent 2007 Kosovan local elections and finished a strong third.

When Kosovo unilaterally declared independence in February 2008, Latifi said, "After the independence [of Kosovo] we will have one obstacle less in the road towards unification. The people will realize that this is not the independence they had expected."

=== Movement for Integration and Unification ===
The LKÇK restructured itself as the Movement for Integration and Unification (LIB) in September 2008, and Latifi was chosen as the party's first leader without opposition. In August 2009, he called for what he described as "eastern Kosova" (i.e., Serbia's Preševo Valley) to be included in a future united Albanian state.

=== Alliance for the Future of Kosovo ===
Latifi joined the right-wing Alliance for the Future of Kosovo in August 2009. The following year, he was elected as mayor of Rahovec in a mayoral by-election in the municipality. Following a meeting with a Kosovo Force (KFOR) representative in the 2011 North Kosovo crisis, he said, "We voiced our restlessness about the developments in the north. We emphasized that the Serbian state criminal structure is present there. We consider it is about time we see law and order there, because the north of Kosova is Kosova." In early 2013, he agreed to implement a law granting more autonomy to the Serb village of Velika Hoča (Hoçë e Madhe) in Rahovec, notwithstanding that he had previously opposed it. During this period, he said that inter-ethnic relations in Rahovec were excellent.

Latifi was defeated by Idriz Vehapi of the Democratic Party of Kosovo (PDK) in the 2013 local elections. He later received the twenty-eighth position on the AAK's list in the 2014 Kosovan parliamentary election, finished twenty-first among its candidates, and was not elected when the list won eleven seats.

The AAK formed an alliance with the PDK for the 2017 Kosovan parliamentary election, and Latifi appeared in the sixty-third position on their combined list. He finished forty-third and was not elected when the list won thirty-nine mandates.

Latifi was re-elected as mayor of Rahovec in the 2017 local elections, defeating Vehapi in a rematch from four years earlier. He was elected to a third term in the 2021 local elections, defeating Visar Korenica of Vetëvendosje in the second round of voting.

== Electoral record ==
=== Local (Rahovec) ===
2021 Kosovan local elections: Mayor of Rahovec
Candidate	Party	First round		Second round	
Candidate	Party	Votes	%	Votes	%
Smajl Latifi (incumbent)	Alliance for the Future of Kosovo	10,144	47.18	11,575	65.19
Visar Korenica	Levizja Vetëvendosje!	5,341	24.84	6,180	34.81
Burim Krasniqi	Democratic League of Kosovo	3,424	15.92		
Bejtullah Deliu	Democratic Party of Kosovo	2,418	11.25		
Xhafer Bytyqi	Xhafer Bytyqi	174	0.81		
Total		21,501	100.00	17,755	100.00

2017 Kosovan local elections: Mayor of Rahovec
Candidate	Party	First round		Second round	
Candidate	Party	Votes	%	Votes	%
Smajl Latifi	Alliance for the Future of Kosovo	7,766	33.50	10,561	50.70
Idriz Vehapi (incumbent)	Democratic Party of Kosovo	6,837	29.50	10,271	49.30
Ibrahim Kryeziu	Democratic League of Kosovo	4,768	20.57		
Visar Korenica	Levizja Vetëvendosje!	3,513	15.16		
Besnik Hoti	Initiative for Kosovo	295	1.27		
Total		23,179	100.00	20,832	100.00

2013 Kosovan local elections: Mayor of Rahovec
Candidate	Party	First round		Second round	
Candidate	Party	Votes	%	Votes	%
Idriz Vehapi	Democratic Party of Kosovo	9,609	38.65	11,890	52.38
Smajl Latifi (incumbent)	Alliance for the Future of Kosovo	8,169	32.86	10,810	47.62
Fahredin Shehu	Democratic League of Kosovo	5,512	22.17		
Dervish Çadraku	Levizja Vetëvendosje!	847	3.41		
Sinan Ejupi	New Kosovo Alliance	352	1.42		
Bojan Nakalamić	New Strength	296	1.19		
Irfan Cana	Civic Initiative "Ndryshe Rahovec"	75	0.30		
Total		24,860	100.00	22,700	100.00

2010 Kosovan local by-election: Mayor of Rahovec
Candidate	Party	First round		Second round	
Candidate	Party	Votes	%	Votes	%
Smajl Latifi	Alliance for the Future of Kosovo	5,267	26.71	10,713	55.76
Ibrahim Kryeziu	Democratic League of Kosovo	5,451	27.65	8,499	44.24
Xhelal Canziba	Democratic Party of Kosovo	5,234	26.55		
Rexhep Oruqi	New Kosovo Alliance	3,261	16.54		
Luljeta Kadiri	Democratic League of Dardania	503	2.55		
Total		19,716	100.00	19,212	100.00

2007 Kosovan local elections: Mayor of Rahovec
Candidate	Party	First round		Second round	
Candidate	Party	Votes	%	Votes	%
Qazim Qeska	Democratic Party of Kosovo	6,527	35.87	8,919	61.06
Nahit Elshani	Democratic League of Kosovo	4,082	22.43	5,689	38.94
Smajl Latifi	National Movement for the Liberation of Kosovo	3,718	20.43		
Enver Sylka	Alliance for the Future of Kosovo	1,916	10.53		
Esad Haxhijaha (incumbent)	Democratic League of Dardania	856	4.70		
Visar Korenica	New Kosovo Alliance	855	4.70		
Vahdet Kollari	ORA	244	1.34		
Total		18,198	100.00	14,608	100.00
