= Avni Klinaku =

Albanian politician (born 1965)

Avni Klinaku is a Kosovar Albanian politician and nationalist.

== Biography ==
Avni Klinaku was born on March 25, 1965, in the village of Mazgit, Obiliq, at the time SAP Kosovo, SR Serbia, SFR Yugoslavia. He finished the technical high school in Pristina (then named after Miladin Popović, now Gjon Gazulli).

His political career started in 1982, as a People's Movement of Kosovo member, until 1984. He was arrested in 1984 by Yugoslavian authorities and imprisoned till 1989. In 1993, he co-founded National Movement for the Liberation of Kosovo (Albanian: Lëvizja Kombëtare për Çlirimin e Kosovës, LKÇK), and was its leader until 1997, before getting arrested again and imprisoned until 2001.
Since 2007, he has served as the leader of the Movement for Unification (Albanian: Lëvizja për Bashkim, LB), a nationalist party in Kosovo, opposing the Ahtisaari Plan and seeking reunification with Albania; he is currently in his second term.

== See also ==
- Movement for Unification
- National Movement for the Liberation of Kosovo
- Albanians in Kosovo
- Albanian nationalism
- List of political parties in Kosovo
