= 2023 Kosovan local elections =

Local government elections in Kosovo

Local elections were held in four municipalities in the north of Kosovo on 23 April 2023. They were initially scheduled to be held in December 2022, but were subsequently postponed. The elections were held in the four Serb-majority municipalities of Leposavić, North Mitrovica, Zubin Potok and Zvečan, located in North Kosovo. The elections were boycotted by the biggest Serb political party in Kosovo, the Serb List, following its departure from Kosovan institutions and the resignation of their mayors in North Kosovo in November. Among the declared candidates, there were only two Serbs. Aleksandar Arsenijević, candidate for mayor of the North Mitrovica Municipality, withdrew his candidacy on 2 December. Only the Democratic Party of Kosovo (PDK) and Vetëvendosje (LVV) had mayoral candidates in all four municipalities. Kosovo President Vjosa Osmani had initially set 25 December as the polling date for the municipal assemblies of Zvečan and Leposavić in the north of Kosovo. On 20 April, candidate for mayor of the Leposavić Municipality Aleksandar Jablanović, leader of the Party of Kosovo Serbs (PKS), withdrew his candidature for running in the elections.

The elections were overshadowed by a boycott of Serbian parties and an extremely low turnout. Only 3.47% of the eligible 45,095 voted: 1,566 of them were Albanians and only 13 were Serbs. All elected heads of municipalities with a predominant Serbian majority are Albanians. This election recorded one of the lowest turnouts ever.

== Debates ==
Debates for local elections in 2023.
Date	Time	Organizer	P Present R Refused to attend U Uninvited S Surrogate				
Date	Time	Organizer	LVV	PDK	PKS	CI "Mitrovica"	Independent
18. apr	11:00	Medija Centar; Čaglavica	U	U	S Andrija Ignjatović	S Nedžad Ugljanin	P Slađana Pantović
18. apr	20:30	RTK 1	P Erden Atiq	R	U	P Betim Osmani	U
19. apr	21:30	RTK 1	R	R	U	U	P Slađana Pantović

== Results ==
=== Leposavić ===
Candidate	Party	Votes	%
Lulzim Hetemi	Vetëvendosje	100	73.53
Albulena Behluli Hetemi	Democratic Party of Kosovo	34	25.00
Aleksandar Jablanović (Note: Withdrawn but still on the ballot)	Party of Kosovo Serbs	2	1.47
Total		136	100.00
Valid votes		136	96.45
Invalid/blank votes		5	3.55
Total votes		141	100.00
Registered voters/turnout		13,318	1.06
Source: CEC of Kosovo, Prishtina Insight

=== North Mitrovica ===
Candidate	Party	Votes	%
Erden Atiq	Vetëvendosje	519	66.54
Taulant Kelmendi	Democratic Party of Kosovo	186	23.85
Betim Osmani	Mitrovica Civic Initiative	75	9.62
Total		780	100.00
Valid votes		780	93.19
Invalid/blank votes		57	6.81
Total votes		837	100.00
Registered voters/turnout		18,118	4.62
Source: CEC of Kosovo, Prishtina Insight

=== Zubin Potok ===
Candidate	Party	Votes	%
Izmir Zeqiri	Democratic Party of Kosovo	196	52.13
Flatron Hasani	Vetëvendosje	180	47.87
Total		376	100.00
Valid votes		376	97.66
Invalid/blank votes		9	2.34
Total votes		385	100.00
Registered voters/turnout		6,661	5.78
Source: CEC of Kosovo, Prishtina Insight

=== Zvečan ===
Candidate	Party	Votes	%
Ilir Peci	Democratic Party of Kosovo	114	60.00
Fetah Peci	Vetëvendosje	71	37.37
Slađana Pantović	Independent	5	2.63
Total		190	100.00
Valid votes		190	93.14
Invalid/blank votes		14	6.86
Total votes		204	100.00
Registered voters/turnout		6,998	2.92
Source: CEC of Kosovo, Prishtina Insight

== Aftermath ==
Despite the low turnout, U.S. officials announced they would recognize the results. As a result of the boycott, ethnic Albanian mayors were elected in all four municipalities. The Vetëvendosje party of Kosovo's prime minister Albin Kurti won the mayoral races in North Mitrovica and Leposavić, while candidates from the opposition Democratic Party of Kosovo were declared the winners in Zvečan and Zubin Potok.

On 26 May 2023, Kosovo police took control of the municipal buildings in Zvečan, Zubin Potok and Leposavić by force, in order to enable the elected mayors – whom ethnic Serbs had refused to cooperate with – to assume office. A week earlier, in North Mitrovica, the transition was handled peacefully. Protesters had gathered in front of the municipal buildings. A civil disturbance took place in Zvečan, during which the protesters unsuccessfully tried to stop the police from escorting the mayor inside. Ten protesters were treated for light injuries and tear gas inhalation, while five police officers received minor injuries. The flag of Serbia was removed from all four municipal buildings and replaced with the flag of Kosovo. Serbia declared that its armed forces have raised the level of combat readiness and have been moved closer to the border. Kosovar authorities' use of force to protect the mayors was condemned by the United States and the EU.

On 29 May 2023, clashes erupted in northern Kosovo leading to injuries to 25 KFOR peacekeepers from Hungary and Italy. Up to 50 ethnic Serb protestors were also injured.

A referendum was held on 21 April 2024 to replace the elected mayors, however failed due to another boycott by the Serb population.

== See also ==
- 2022–2023 North Kosovo crisis
- Election boycott
