= Bahri Fazliu =

Kosovo Albanian poet, publicist and nationalist

- Born: 1971; Llaushë, SAP Kosovo, SR Serbia, SFR Yugoslavia
- Died: 1998 (aged 26–27) near Plav, Montenegro, FR Yugoslavia
- Known for: National Movement for the Liberation of Kosovo, Çlirimi newspaper
- Awards: Hero of Kosovo

Bahri Fazliu (1971–1998) was a Kosovo Albanian poet, publicist and Albanian nationalist.

== Biography ==
Bahri Fazliu was born in the village of Llaushë near Podujevë, Kosovo, at the time in Yugoslavia. He was the younger brother of Fahri Fazliu, PMK member who lost his life in a shoot-out with Yugoslav police on 2 November 1989, in "Kodra e Diellit" neighborhood in Pristina.

Bahri was one of the founders of NMLK (Albanian: Lëvizja Kombëtare për Çlirimin e Kosovës, LKÇK), and its leader after the imprisonment of Avni Klinaku. NMLK was a revolutionary movement, and a constant criticizer of Democratic League of Kosovo and Ibrahim Rugova's Gandhism.

He was the chief editor of the newspaper Çlirimi (English: Liberation), which would be secretly delivered inside Kosovo every three months. On May 7, 1998, he got involved in a skirmish with the Yugoslav Army in an area called Bjeshka e Bogiqes, in the vicinity of Plav, a Montenegrin town at the border between Albania, Montenegro, and Kosovo (then Serbia, Yugoslavia), eventually getting killed. This was 4 days before the official agreement between NMLK and newly-active Kosovo Liberation Army, that would result in NMLK officially joining KLA.

=== Legacy ===
There are streets in nowadays Kosovo which bear his name. He would later receive the title "Hero of Kosovo" (Albanian: "Hero i Kosovës").

=== Publications ===
- Kundër mistifikimit, për të vërtetën ("Against mystification, for the truth"), Çlirimi, Pristina, 2000.

== See also ==
- Albanians in Kosovo
- Kosovo War
