= Visar Korenica =

Kosovan politician

Visar Korenica (born 14 June 1984) is a politician in Kosovo. He has served in the Assembly of the Republic of Kosovo since 2021 as a member of Vetëvendosje (VV).

== Early life and career ==
Korenica was born to a Kosovo Albanian family in Prizren, in what was then the Socialist Autonomous Province of Kosovo in the Socialist Republic of Serbia, Socialist Federal Republic of Yugoslavia. He holds a master's degree in international business and is a manager in logistics.

== Politician ==
Korenica began his political career as a member of the New Kosovo Alliance (AKR). He was the party's candidate for mayor of Rahovec in the 2007 Kosovan local elections and finished sixth. He later appeared in the eleventh position on the party's list for the Rahovec municipal assembly in the 2009 local elections. Assembly elections in Kosovo are held under open list proportional representation; Korenica finished fourteenth among the AKR's candidates and was not elected when the list won four seats He later joined Vetëvendosje and ran as its mayoral candidate in the 2017 local elections, finishing fourth.

He appeared in the eighty-third position on Vetëvendosje's electoral list in the 2019 Kosovan parliamentary election, finished in fifty-eighth place, and was not elected when the list won twenty-nine seats.

=== Parliamentarian ===
Korenica received the seventy-ninth position on Vetëvendosje's list in the 2021 parliamentary election, finished in forty-fifth place among the list's candidates, and was elected when the list won fifty-eight seats. Vetëvendosje won the election and afterward became the leading force in the Republic of Kosovo's coalition government. Korenica is a supporter of the administration and serves on the committee for the oversight of public finances and the committee on budget, labour, and transfer.

In 2021, Korenica released the names of around thirty Radio Television of Kosovo (RTK) employees whom he described as having family connections to officials from other political parties previously in power. He ran for mayor of Rahovec again in the 2021 local elections and was defeated in the second round of voting.

Korenica has clashed with Vetëvendosje's leadership on some occasions. He was removed as the party's coordinator for Rahovec in 2022 for voting against a new draft civil code.

On the fifth anniversary of Kosovo Serb politician Oliver Ivanović's assassination by unknown parties in January 2023, Republic of Kosovo prime minister and Vetëvendosje leader Albin Kurti made respectful comments about Ivanović's time in public life. Korenica responded by dismissing Ivanović as a "criminal" and charging that Serbian president Aleksandar Vučić had ordered Ivanović's death for refusing to accept his leadership.

== Electoral record ==
=== Local (Rahovec) ===
2021 Kosovan local elections: Mayor of Rahovec
Candidate	Party	First round		Second round	
Candidate	Party	Votes	%	Votes	%
Smajl Latifi (incumbent)	Alliance for the Future of Kosovo	10,144	47.18	11,575	65.19
Visar Korenica	Levizja Vetëvendosje!	5,341	24.84	6,180	34.81
Burim Krasniqi	Democratic League of Kosovo	3,424	15.92		
Bejtullah Deliu	Democratic Party of Kosovo	2,418	11.25		
Xhafer Bytyqi	Xhafer Bytyqi	174	0.81		
Total		21,501	100.00	17,755	100.00

2017 Kosovan local elections: Mayor of Rahovec
Candidate	Party	First round		Second round	
Candidate	Party	Votes	%	Votes	%
Smajl Latifi	Alliance for the Future of Kosovo	7,766	33.50	10,561	50.70
Idriz Vehapi (incumbent)	Democratic Party of Kosovo	6,837	29.50	10,271	49.30
Ibrahim Kryeziu	Democratic League of Kosovo	4,768	20.57		
Visar Korenica	Levizja Vetëvendosje!	3,513	15.16		
Besnik Hoti	Initiative for Kosovo	295	1.27		
Total		23,179	100.00	20,832	100.00

2007 Kosovan local elections: Mayor of Rahovec
Candidate	Party	First round		Second round	
Candidate	Party	Votes	%	Votes	%
Qazim Qeska	Democratic Party of Kosovo	6,527	35.87	8,919	61.06
Nahit Elshani	Democratic League of Kosovo	4,082	22.43	5,689	38.94
Smajl Latifi	National Movement for the Liberation of Kosovo	3,718	20.43		
Enver Sylka	Alliance for the Future of Kosovo	1,916	10.53		
Esad Haxhijaha (incumbent)	Democratic League of Dardania	856	4.70		
Visar Korenica	New Kosovo Alliance	855	4.70		
Vahdet Kollari	ORA	244	1.34		
Total		18,198	100.00	14,608	100.00
