= Movement for Integration and Unification =

Movement for Integration and Unification, (Albanian: Lëvizja Kombëtare për Integrim dhe Bashkim) was a radical nationalist political party in Kosovo, being a direct successor of National Movement for the Liberation of Kosovo, (Albanian: Lëvizja Kombëtare për Çlirimin e Kosovës, LKÇK), a radical left-wing nationalist political movement in Kosovo, coming out as a faction of LPK in the 1990s promoting war against the Yugoslavian authorities and strong Albanian irredentism.

Its leader was Smajl Latifi, followed by Fadil Fazliu after his resignation. In May 2011, MIU joined the Movement for Unification (Albanian: Lëvizja për Bashkim, LB), of Avni Klinaku, another former member of National Movement for the Liberation of Kosovo.

== See also ==
- Albanian Nationalism
- Albanians in Kosovo
- Kosovo War
- List of Kosovo Albanians
- List of political parties in Kosovo
- Movement for Unification
- National Movement for the Liberation of Kosovo
- People's Movement of Kosovo
