= North Kosovo referendum =

North Kosovo referendum may refer to:

- 2012 North Kosovo referendum
- 2024 North Kosovo referendum
