= Srđa Popović =

Srđa Popović, also spelled Srdja Popovic, may refer to:

- Srđa Popović (activist) (born 1973), Serbian activist of Otpor!
- Srđa Popović (lawyer) (1937–2013), Yugoslav and Serbian civil rights lawyer and activist

== See also ==
- Srđan Popović, politician
