= Fazliu =

Fazliu is an Albanian surname. Notable people with the name include:

- Astrit Fazliu (born 1987), Kosovo Albanian footballer
- Bahri Fazliu (1971–1998), Kosovo Albanian poet, publicist and nationalist
- Valon Fazliu (born 1996), Swiss footballer
- Kreshnik Fazliu, known as MC Kresha (born 1984), Kosovo Albanian rapper
- Laura Fazliu (born 2000), Kosovo Albanian judoka
