= 2010 Kosovan local elections =

The Republic of Kosovo oversaw local elections in three municipalities in 2010.

Istog held a special mayoral by-election over two rounds on 11 April and 9 May 2010. The election was necessitated by the death of incumbent mayor Fadil Ferati of the Democratic League of Kosovo (LDK) on 30 January.

A mayoral election and assembly election took place in the predominantly Serb municipality of Parteš on 20 June 2010 (with a second round of voting for mayor on 18 July), following the formal establishment of the municipality.

Rahovec held a special mayoral by-election over two rounds on 21 November and 19 December 2010. The election took place after the resignation of Qazim Qeska of the Democratic Party of Kosovo (PDK). (Qeska attempted to return to the position after submitting his resignation, but he was not permitted to do so.)

== Results ==
=== Istog (11 April and 9 May 2010) ===
Mayoral results
Candidate	Party	First round		Second round	
Candidate	Party	Votes	%	Votes	%
Haki Rugova	Democratic League of Kosovo	7,349	49.34	8,508	75.92
Shasivar Haxhijaj	Democratic Party of Kosovo	3,249	21.81	2,698	24.08
Muhamet Shatri	Alliance for the Future of Kosovo	3,207	21.53		
Rifat Osmanaj	Democratic League of Dardania	585	3.93		
Ismet Mulaj	New Kosovo Alliance	506	3.40		
Total		14,896	100.00	11,206	100.00

=== Parteš (20 June and 18 July 2010) ===
Mayoral results
Candidate	Party	First round		Second round	
Candidate	Party	Votes	%	Votes	%
Nenad Cvetković	Homeland – Lista Zavičaj	914	47.68	1,031	57.63
Todor Mirković	United Serbian List	488	25.46	758	42.37
Vesna Jovanović	Gizzo – Together for Survival	434	22.64		
Goran Milošević	Serbian Social Democratic Party	81	4.23		
Total		1,917	100.00	1,789	100.00

Municipal assembly results
Party	Votes	%	Seats
Homeland – Lista Zavičaj	691	40.03	6
United Serbian List	346	20.05	3
People's Initiative	305	17.67	3
Gizzo – Together for Survival	278	16.11	2
Serbian Social Democratic Party	106	6.14	1
Total	1,726	100.00	15

=== Rahovec (21 November and 19 December 2010) ===
Mayoral results
Candidate	Party	First round		Second round	
Candidate	Party	Votes	%	Votes	%
Smajl Latifi	Alliance for the Future of Kosovo	5,267	26.71	10,713	55.76
Ibrahim Kryeziu	Democratic League of Kosovo	5,451	27.65	8,499	44.24
Xhelal Canziba	Democratic Party of Kosovo	5,234	26.55		
Rexhep Oruqi	New Kosovo Alliance	3,261	16.54		
Luljeta Kadiri	Democratic League of Dardania	503	2.55		
Total		19,716	100.00	19,212	100.00
