= Movement for Unification =

Movement for Unification Lëvizja për Bashkim
- Leader: Valon Murati
- Headquarters: Pristina, Kosovo
- Ideology: Albanian nationalism Greater Albania; Albania-Kosovo unification
- Colours: Red, White, Black
- Assembly: 0 / 120

Website
- www.levizjaperbashkim.com

The Movement for Unification (Albanian: Lëvizja për Bashkim, LB) is a political party in Kosovo. Its main goal is unification of Kosovo and all other former Yugoslavian territories populated by Albanians to Albania. Its leader is Avni Klinaku, known as co-founder of former National Movement for the Liberation of Kosovo (Albanian: Lëvizjes Kombëtare për Çlirimin e Kosovës, LKÇK), a nationalist organization of the 1980s promoting active resistance and separation of Kosovo from Yugoslavia, having some connections to People's Movement of Kosovo (PMK).

== Political activity ==
During 2010 elections in Kosovo, the party ran in coalition with Vetëvendosje, within the latter's parliamentary group, but split the following year.

LB was the promoter of the parliamentary resolute of 6 September 2012 for replacing all telephony codes of Kosovo with +355 of Albania, which was ignored by Kosovo government and overruled by the controversial agreements in Brussels.

On 23 May 2011, Movement for Integration and Unification, (Albanian: Lëvizja për Integrim dhe Bashkim, LBI) joined LB. MIU had been the main successor of National Movement for the Liberation of Kosovo, with Fadil Fazliu being the leader after the resignation of Smajl Latifi.

== Representatives in the Assembly of Kosovo ==
- Aurora Bakalli
- Agim Kuleta

== See also ==
- Albanian nationalism
- Kosovo Albanians
- Kosovo War
- List of Kosovo Albanians
- List of political parties in Kosovo
- Movement for Integration and Unification
- National Movement for the Liberation of Kosovo
- People's Movement of Kosovo
- Vetëvendosje
- Ahtisaari Plan
