= Mazgit =

Mazgit: Mazgit (Albanian); Мазгит/Mazgit (Serbian)
- Village
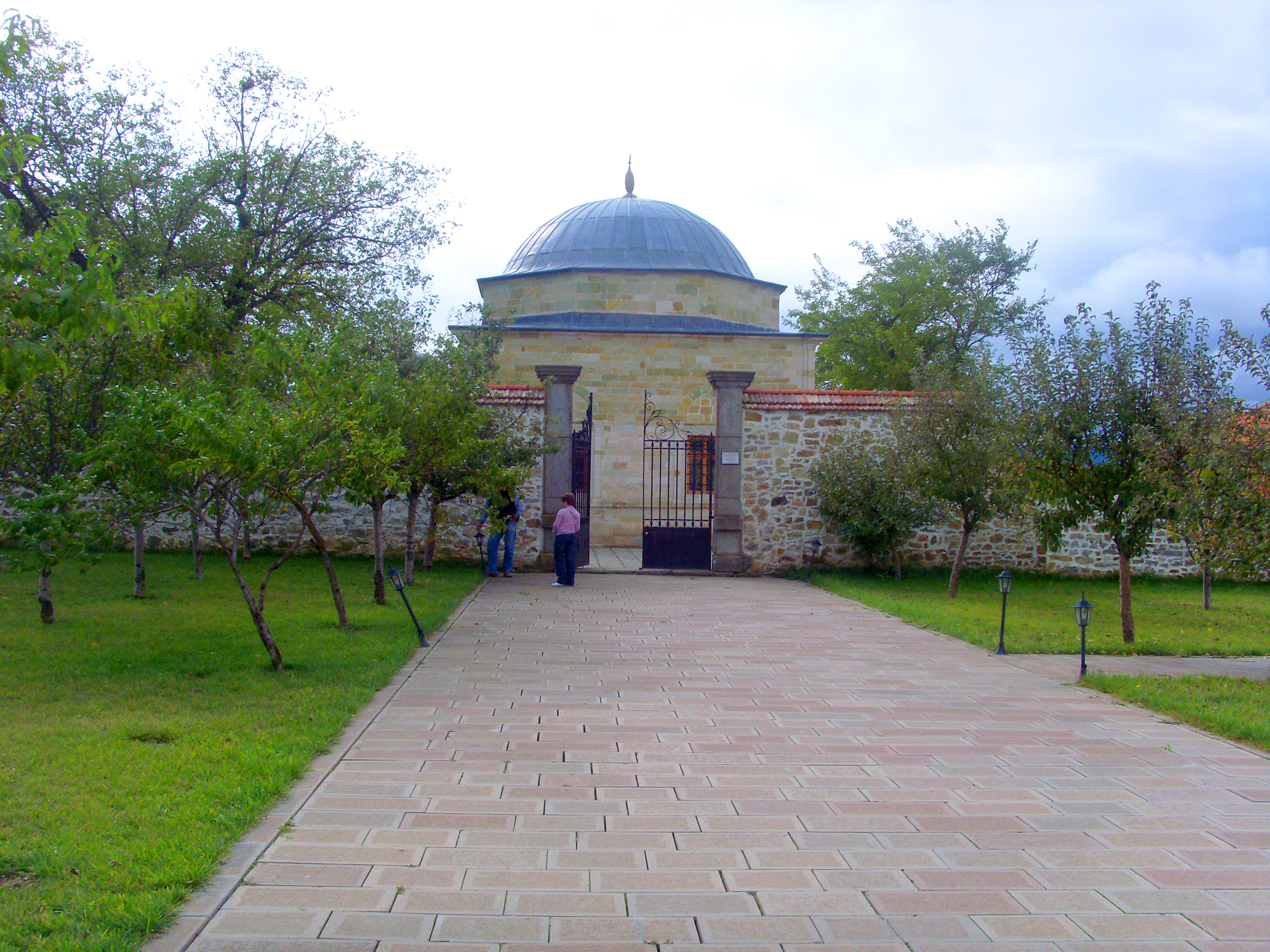
- Sultan Murad tomb in Mazgit

- Location within Kosovo
- Coordinates: 42.689011°N 21.090821°E
- Location: Kosovo
- District: Prishtinë
- Municipality: Obiliq
- Elevation: 569 m (1,867 ft)

Population (2024)
  - Total: 2,906
- Time zone: UTC+1 (CET)
  - Summer (DST): UTC+2 (CEST)

Mazgit (Albanian: Mazgit, Serbian Cyrillic: Мазгит/Mazgit) is a village in the Obiliq municipality, Kosovo.

== Notable people ==
- Avni Klinaku, Albanian politician
