= Idriz Vehapi =

Academic and politician in Kosovo

Idriz Vehapi (born 15 December 1964) is an academic and politician in Kosovo. He was a minister in the Kosovo government from 2008 to 2010, served in the Assembly of the Republic of Kosovo from 2011 to 2013, and was mayor of Rahovec from 2013 to 2017. Vehapi is a member of the Democratic Party of Kosovo (PDK).

== Early life and academic career ==
Vehapi was born to an Albanian family in Rahovec, in what was then the Autonomous Province of Kosovo and Metohija in the Socialist Republic of Serbia, Socialist Federal Republic of Yugoslavia. He received a bachelor's degree in biology from the historical University of Pristina in 1989 and holds a master's degree (2001) and doctorate (2005) from the post-1999 institution of the same name. He has worked at the university since 1989 and became a full professor of biology in 2016. He has published widely in his field.

== Politician ==
=== Early years in Rahovec (2000–07) ===
Vehapi appeared in the fourth position on the PDK's electoral list for Rahovec in the 2000 Kosovan local elections. Local assembly elections in Kosovo are held under open list proportional representation; Vehapi finished sixth among the PDK's candidates and was elected when the list won six seats. The Democratic League of Kosovo (LDK) won the election, and the PDK served in opposition.

He appeared in the ninety-fifth position on the PDK's list for the 2001 Kosovan parliamentary election, which was held under closed list proportional representation. The list won twenty-six seats, and he was not elected.

Vehapi again appeared in the fourth position on the PDK's list for Rahovec in the 2002 local elections. The party won ten seats; it is probable that he served for a second term in the local assembly, although online sources do not confirm this point. The LDK once again won the election.

Vehapi was not a candidate in the 2007 Kosovan local elections, the first in which mayors were directly elected.

=== Government minister (2008–10) ===
All parliamentary elections in Kosovo since 2007 have been held under open list proportional representation. Vehapi appeared in the sixty-fourth position on the PDK list in the 2007 Kosovan parliamentary election and finished sixty-third among the party's candidates. The PDK won thirty-seven seats, and he was not elected.

The PDK emerged from the 2007 election as the largest party in the Kosovo assembly and afterward formed a coalition government with the LDK. The new ministry was established on 9 January 2008, and Vehapi was appointed as minister of agriculture.

Vehapi met with Albanian agriculture minister Jemin Gjana in the buildup to Kosovo's unilateral declaration of independence in February 2008. After the meeting, Gjina said that Albania would supply Kosovo with food products in the event that Serbia introduced an embargo. (The matter was ultimately moot, as no embargo was imposed.) In April 2009, Vehapi and Gjana signed a cooperation agreement on agriculture.

Vehapi's ministerial tenure ended with a cabinet shuffle on 31 March 2010. It had previously been rumoured in Kosovo's Albanian language media that he would be dropped from cabinet due to a perceived inefficiency in running the ministry. One of his last acts as minister was to sign a cooperation agreement with Hungarian agriculture minister József Gráf.

After leaving cabinet, Vehapi served for a time as deputy minister of the environment.

=== Parliamentarian (2011–13) ===
Vehapi was given the thirty-seventh position on the PDK list in the 2010 Kosovan parliamentary election, finished nineteenth, and was elected when the list won thirty-four seats. He took his seat when the assembly convened in February 2011. The PDK won the election and remained the dominant force in Kosovo's government. Vehapi served as a government supporter and chaired the assembly committee on education, culture, youth, sports, public administration, local government, and media.

As chair of the committee responsible for media, Vehapi held consultations with the European Commission on a draft law for Kosovo's public broadcaster, Radio Television of Kosovo. The law was ultimately approved in March 2012, despite disagreements over a clause for a third channel for non-Serb minority communities.

=== Mayor of Rahovec (2013–17) ===
Vehapi was elected as mayor of Rahovec in the 2013 Kosovan local elections, defeating incumbent Smajl Latifi of the Alliance for the Future of Kosovo (AAK) in the second round. He was inaugurated on 21 December 2013, resigning from parliament on the same day as he could not hold a dual mandate. As mayor, he supported the municipality's well-known agricultural sector and signed a cooperation agreement between Rahovec and Ozalj, Croatia.

He was narrowly defeated by Latifi in the second round of the 2017 local elections in a rematch from 2013.

=== Since 2017 ===
From February to October 2018, Vehapi was a political advisor to PDK leader Kadri Veseli in the latter's capacity as speaker of the Kosovo assembly.

Vehapi appeared in the twenty-fifth position on the PDK's list in the 2019 Kosovan parliamentary election and finished twenty-sixth among its candidates. The party won twenty-four seats, and he was not elected. Due to a requirement for one-third female representation, he was also not immediately in line for a replacement mandate. He ultimately did not serve in the sitting of parliament that followed.

== Electoral record ==
=== Local (Rahovec) ===
2017 Kosovan local elections: Mayor of Rahovec
Candidate	Party	First round		Second round	
Candidate	Party	Votes	%	Votes	%
Smajl Latifi	Alliance for the Future of Kosovo	7,766	33.50	10,561	50.70
Idriz Vehapi (incumbent)	Democratic Party of Kosovo	6,837	29.50	10,271	49.30
Ibrahim Kryeziu	Democratic League of Kosovo	4,768	20.57		
Visar Korenica	Levizja Vetëvendosje!	3,513	15.16		
Besnik Hoti	Initiative for Kosovo	295	1.27		
Total		23,179	100.00	20,832	100.00

2013 Kosovan local elections: Mayor of Rahovec
Candidate	Party	First round		Second round	
Candidate	Party	Votes	%	Votes	%
Idriz Vehapi	Democratic Party of Kosovo	9,609	38.65	11,890	52.38
Smajl Latifi (incumbent)	Alliance for the Future of Kosovo	8,169	32.86	10,810	47.62
Fahredin Shehu	Democratic League of Kosovo	5,512	22.17		
Dervish Çadraku	Levizja Vetëvendosje!	847	3.41		
Sinan Ejupi	New Kosovo Alliance	352	1.42		
Bojan Nakalamić	New Strength	296	1.19		
Irfan Cana	Civic Initiative "Ndryshe Rahovec"	75	0.30		
Total		24,860	100.00	22,700	100.00
