= Xhelal Canziba =

Politician from Kosovo

Xhelal Canziba (born 19 July 1958) is a politician in Kosovo. He was active in Kosovo's parallel institutions in the 1990s and served in the Assembly of Kosovo from 2002 to 2007 as a member of the Democratic Party of Kosovo (PDK).

== Early life and private career ==
Canziba was born to an Albanian family in Rahovec, in what was then the Autonomous Region of Kosovo and Metohija in the People's Republic of Serbia, Federal People's Republic of Yugoslavia. He graduated in geodesy and is known as an expert in the field.

== Politician ==
=== Parallel institutions during the 1990s ===
During the 1990s, most members of the Kosovo Albanian community boycotted Serbian state institutions and took part in parallel governing structures. Canziba was elected to the parallel Kosovo Albanian parliament in the 1992 general election and was recognized as the leader of a parallel municipal authority in Rahovec. At the time, he was a member of the Democratic League of Kosovo (LDK). He was imprisoned by Serbian authorities for a time in the 1990s.

=== Since 2000 ===
Canziba received the twenty-eighth position on the Democratic Party of Kosovo's electoral list in the 2001 Kosovan parliamentary election, which was held under closed list proportional representation, and narrowly missed direct election when the list won twenty-six seats. Three members of the PDK's delegation resigned from the assembly in March 2002 after being appointed as cabinet ministers, and Canziba was able to enter the assembly as a replacement. He served as a supporter of Kosovo's coalition government, was first vice-chair of the finance and economy committee, and was a member of the committee for trade and industry and the committee for environment and spatial planning.

He appeared in the lead position on the PDK's list for Rahovec in the 2002 Kosovan local elections. The list won six seats; online reports do not indicate if he took a seat in the municipality assembly.

Canziba once again appeared in the twenty-eighth position on the PDK's list in the 2004 parliamentary election and was re-elected when the list won thirty seats. The LDK formed a new coalition government with the Alliance for the Future of Kosovo (AAK) after the election, and the PDK served in opposition. In this term, Canziba served on the committee for agriculture, forestry, rural development, environment, and spatial planning.

Kosovo adopted a system of open list proportional representation for parliamentary elections in 2007. Canziba appeared in the forty-fifth position on the PDK's list, finished eighty-seventh among its candidates, and was not re-elected when the list won thirty-seven seats.

He appeared in the second position on the PDK's list for Rahovec in the 2009 local elections, finished third, and was elected when the list won ten seats. He later ran for mayor of Rahovec in a special 2010 by-election and finished a strong third. He was not a candidate in the 2013 local elections and has not returned to active political life since this time.

Canziba left the PDK to join the AAK in 2017. He returned to the PDK in 2019.

== Electoral record ==
=== Local (Rahovec) ===
2010 Kosovan local by-election: Mayor of Rahovec
Candidate	Party	First round		Second round	
Candidate	Party	Votes	%	Votes	%
Smajl Latifi	Alliance for the Future of Kosovo	5,267	26.71	10,713	55.76
Ibrahim Kryeziu	Democratic League of Kosovo	5,451	27.65	8,499	44.24
Xhelal Canziba	Democratic Party of Kosovo	5,234	26.55		
Rexhep Oruqi	New Kosovo Alliance	3,261	16.54		
Luljeta Kadiri	Democratic League of Dardania	503	2.55		
Total		19,716	100.00	19,212	100.00
