= Party of Kosovo Serbs =

Party of Kosovo Serbs Партија косовских Срба Partija kosovskih Srba
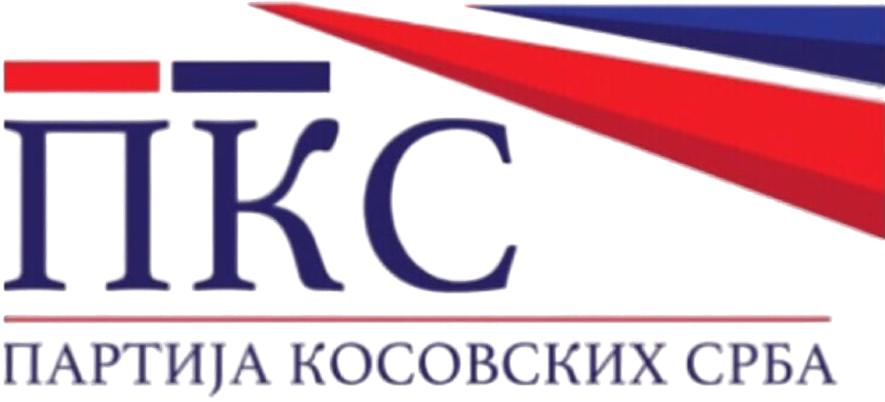
- Abbreviation: PKS
- President: Aleksandar Jablanović
- Founded: 6 April 2017
- Registered: 15 May 2017
- Split from: Serb List
- Headquarters: Leposavić, Kosovo
- Ideology: Serb minority politics
- Political position: Right-wing
- Colours: Red; Blue; White
- Assembly: 0 / 120
- Mayors: 0 / 38
- Municipal assemblies: 0 / 994

Party flag

Website
- Archived 20 April 2021 at the Wayback Machine

The Party of Kosovo Serbs (PKS, Serbian: Партија косовских Срба, romanized: Partija kosovskih Srba) is a political party of the Serb minority in Kosovo, led by former Serb List leader Aleksandar Jablanović. The city of Leposavić is considered the strongest support of the party.

== History ==
Jablanović was previously the Minister of Communities and Returns in the Government of Kosovo. Then Prime Minister Isa Mustafa dismissed him from office in February 2015 after a statement in which, as judged from Pristina, he insulted the mothers of Gjakova by calling the students of the attack on the bus with Serbs going to the cemetery "savages" and "freaks". After that incident, Jablanović moved to the Ministry of Labour, Employment, Veterans and Social Affairs of the Government of Serbia, and resigned after the incident with his brother.

Following Jablanović's resignation from the Serb List, he founded the PKS, a splinter party of the Serb List, on 6 April 2017 and registered on 15 May 2017. In June 2017, attacks and conflicts between the two parties became frequent.

In the 2017 Kosovan parliamentary election, the PKS won just 2,126 votes, and they missed the extraordinary elections for mayors of municipalities in North Kosovo in May of that year. The party also took part in the 2019 parliamentary election, but lost it to the Serb List, winning only 816 votes.

In November 2022, during the North Kosovo crisis, after negotiations with Kosovo President Vjosa Osmani, the party decided to stop boycotting the 2022 local elections and take part in them.
