= Unification of Albania and Kosovo =

Political idea

The idea of unification of Albania and Kosovo has been floated before and after Kosovo declared independence in 2008. This idea has been connected to the irredentist concept of Greater Albania. As of the 2021 estimate, approximately 97% of the population of Kosovo are ethnic Albanians.

Surveys show consistently high approval rates over time, with majorities in Albania and Kosovo favoring unification, including recent data from 2024 indicating overwhelming support in Albania and a clear majority in Kosovo. Despite this public sentiment, both governments uphold the existence of two independent states and prioritize Euro-Atlantic integration. Albania continues to play a key role as Kosovo’s main ally, providing essential political and diplomatic support for its international consolidation.

== History ==
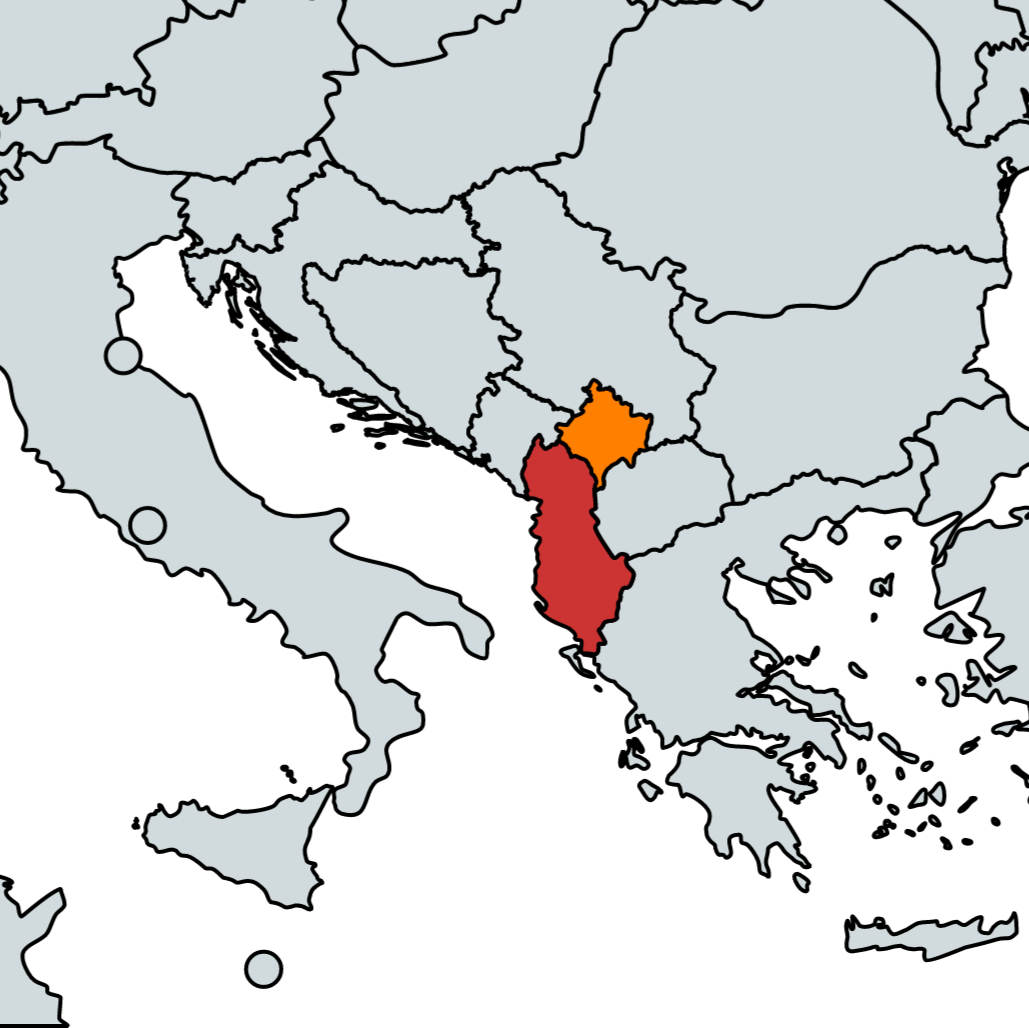
Albania (red) and Kosovo (orange) in Southeast Europe

The prospect of Kosovo unifying with Albania dates to the Bujan Conference, held between delegates of the communist parties which headed the Albanian and Yugoslav national liberation movements during World War II. Based on the ideal of self-determination, Yugoslavia would cede Kosovo to Albania after the war according to a resolution adopted at the conference; this resolution, however, did not materialize. PR Albania and FPR Yugoslavia maintained close relations in the immediate post-World War II period, during which Yugoslavia wooed Albania with an offer of ceding the Autonomous Region of Kosovo and Metohija to Albania in exchange for Albania's integration into a future Balkan Federation. However, the Tito–Stalin split of 1948 cut these notions short, leading to tensions between Yugoslavia and Albania.

During 1981 protests in Kosovo for greater autonomy, Yugoslavia feared calls for the unification of Kosovo and Albania. However, Albanians were not of one mind. In the early 1990s, Albanian politicians offered contradictory statements on the possibility. Political activist Ukshin Hoti, founder of the Party of Albanian National Union, who disappeared in Serbian police custody in 1999, was an ardent supporter of the unification of Kosovo with Albania. In 2001, Arben Imami, a politician from the Democratic Party of Albania, stated that unification of Kosovo with Albania should be a party goal, but this statement was criticized within his own party.

The Ahtisaari Plan conditioned Kosovo's independence on the adoption of a multiethnic “Kosovar,” rather than "Albanian," identity. Still, Gallup surveys from 2007 revealed that 73% of Kosovo Albanians believed that, in an ideal world, Albanians would live united in one country. The same support was seen in Albania, where 68% of the citizens agreed. However, support for unification declined after Kosovo declared independence - support for unification in Kosovo declined to 54% in 2008, and a later poll by the Albanian Institute for International Studies from 2010 showed that 37% of surveyed Albanians considered unification of Albania with Kosovo as neither positive or negative, while 35% saw it as negative and only 9% considered it a positive development. In 2017, some mainstream Albanian politicians, such as Ben Blushi, came out in support of unification. In Kosovo, the political party Vetëvendosje supports unification. Attempts at political union between Albania and Kosovo may result in diplomatic conflict with Serbia, which regards Kosovo as its de jure territory.

In May 2019, Kosovo's President Hashim Thaçi suggested a referendum on the unification of Kosovo and Albania, if the slow integration process with the European Union did not accelerate. Some, however, viewed this merely as an attempt by Thaçi to “keep himself in the spotlight,” without any real intention of uniting the two countries. Earlier, in 2011, Albanian Foreign Minister Edmond Haxhinasto called the prospect of national unification of Albania and Kosovo "damaging," arguing that "Albanian integration will be achieved through integration in the European Union, when our entire region and all states where Albanians live are members of the EU"; Kosovo political leaders were in agreement.

In September 2025, the Albanian Prime Minister Edi Rama ruled out a territorial unification of Kosovo and Albania, stating that "national unification only means joining the European Union, everything else is a fairy tale." He added: "We live in the 21st century and we cannot think in the 21st century with formulas from the 20th century, let alone the 19th century or earlier."

== Public opinion ==
Before Kosovo's declaration of independence in 2008, support for the unification of Albania and Kosovo was low. According to a 2005 poll, only 10% of Kosovars supported a union of Albania and Kosovo at the time. In 2007, The Economist concluded that "younger Albanians in Kosovo have developed a Kosovar identity of their own", and that in Albanian politics, a possible unification with Kosovo was not seen as a relevant issue and a possible accession to the EU was a far more important concern for Albanians. A lack of economic integration between Kosovo and Albania was also noted - Albania did not rank among Kosovo's top 10 importers. Following the Kosovo's declaration of independence, a 2010 Balkan Insight poll showed that only 29.2% of Kosovar Albanians surveyed supported a limited realisation of Greater Albania in the form of a union between Albania and Kosovo.

Polls supporting unification of Kosovo with Albania notwithstanding, the goal of Albanian politicians has been entrance into NATO and the European Union, rather than national unification. Some Roman Catholic and Orthodox Christian Albanians fear that any possible unification of Balkan areas that bring sizable numbers of Muslims into the new state may lead to an increasing "Muslimization" of Albania.

According to a 2019 poll by Open Society Foundations that covered 2,504 respondents in both countries, 54% of Kosovar Albanian respondents were in favor of unification between Albania and Kosovo, compared to 63% of the respondents in Albania. The same poll found 64% of Kosovar Albanians and 75% of Albanians in Albania were in favour of holding a referendum. Those who oppose unification believe that Kosovo and Albania would function better as separate countries, and that Kosovo and Albania have a different culture and tradition. When asked whether they would be willing to pay a tax for unification, 43.5% of respondents in Kosovo agreed, compared to 29.5% in Albania. However, the majority of respondents believe that the unification of Kosovo and Albania and accession to the EU are mutually exclusive, with only 29.6% of respondents in Kosovo and 46.5% respondents in Albania believing that these two processes do not contradict each other. In this regard, 66.4% of Kosovar Albanian respondents and 84.7% of Albanian respondents believe that their country should seek accession to the European Union rather than national unification.

A 2020 article by Tirana Times raised several issues related to the possible unification of the two countries. About 42% of respondents in Kosovo and 37% in Albania considered accession to the EU and the unification of two countries as contradictory processes. In Albania, 76% of respondents believed that the development of relations between Albania and Kosovo would benefit both sides equally, while 59% of Kosovar respondents believed so. Regarding the unification between Albania and Kosovo, 63% of Albanian and 54% of Kosovar Albanian responders expressed their support of it, but when asked if they would still support unification even if it required a tax, support dropped to 29% in Albania and 44% in Kosovo. Tirana Times argues that the relatively lower support for unification in Kosovo shows "the raise in Kosovo-centered stream of thinking and identity over the first decade of its statehood". According to the newspaper, "the poll clearly indicates that, in addition to the Kosovo part that was more highly integrated with Yugoslavia, now the post-war middle class of Kosovo is also finding it easier to identify with the new state of Kosovo than with its old, Albanian-tied identity."

A Euronews Albania Barometer poll in 2021 showed 79.2% of Albanians in Albania supporting unification with Kosovo. In a September 2021 poll by the Kosovar Center for Security Studies (QKSS) and the National Endowment for Democracy, 55% of Kosovar Albanian respondents were in favour of Kosovo's unification with Albania.

According to a December 2022 survey by UBO Consulting from Pristina, 60% of Kosovar citizens were pro-unification.

== Comparison ==
Subdivision	Area km^{2}	Population	GDP (nominal)
Albania	28,748	2,349,622	€33.330 billion
Kosovo	10,887	1,585,000	€14.100 billion
Total	39,635	3,934,622	€47.430 billion

== See also ==
- Albanian nationalism
- Greater Albania
- Partition of Kosovo
- 2021 Balkan non-papers
- Unification of Moldova and Romania
