= Gani Dreshaj =

Kosovar politician

Gani Dreshaj (born 14 August 1965) is a politician in Kosovo. He served in the Assembly of the Republic of Kosovo from 2017 to 2019 and was a deputy minister in the Republic of Kosovo government from 2020 to 2021. Dreshaj is a member of the Alliance for the Future of Kosovo (AAK).

== Early life and career ==
Dreshaj was born to a Kosovo Albanian family in the village of Vrella in Istog, in what was then the Autonomous Province of Kosovo and Metohija in the Socialist Republic of Serbia, Socialist Federal Republic of Yugoslavia. He is an entrepreneur and has owned a company that produces Aquintell mineral water.

== Politician ==
=== Early years (2013–17) ===
Dreshaj began his political career at the municipal level in Istog, appearing in the tenth place on a combined electoral list of the AAK and the Democratic League of Dardania (LDD) in the 2013 Kosovan local elections. Assembly elections in Kosovo are held under open list proportional representation; Dreshaj finished second among the list's candidates and was elected when the AAK–LDD alliance won six seats.

He was included on the AAK's list in the 2014 Kosovan parliamentary election, finished nineteenth, and was not elected when the list won eleven mandates.

=== Parliamentarian (2017–19) ===
The AAK contested the 2017 parliamentary election in an alliance with the Democratic Party of Kosovo (DPK). Dreshaj received the eightieth position on the combined list and finished in thirty-sixth place among its candidates. The alliance won thirty-nine seats. Dreshaj was not immediately elected due to a requirement for one-third female representation. The PDK and AAK formed a coalition government after the election, and he received a mandate in September 2017 to replace Rrustem Berisha, who had been appointed as a cabinet minister. In the assembly, he was a government supporter and a member of the committee for economic development, infrastructure, trade, industry, and regional development.

He ran for mayor of Istog in the 2017 Kosovan local elections and was initially declared the winner over Democratic League of Kosovo (LDK) incumbent Haki Rugova in the second round of voting. Rugova had held a lead until the municipality's postal votes went overwhelmingly in Dreshaj's favour. Rugova contended that the postal votes were manipulated by organized crime and challenged the result. A re-vote was ordered for December 2017, and Rugova was narrowly re-elected at the end of a contentious ballot count.

Dreshaj called for an increase in Kosovo's minimum wage during his parliamentary term, citing the need to prevent youth from leaving the territory.

During an assembly debate on 18 May 2018, Dreshaj said "I'm going to ruin his face" in regards to LDK delegate Arben Geshi. After his parliamentary term ended, he was found guilty of criminal intimidation for this statement and issued a fine. Dreshaj was in Germany at the time of the verdict; he said that he did not accept it and would appeal after returning to Kosovo.

He finished twelfth among the AAK's candidates in the 2019 parliamentary election. The list won thirteen seats, and he was once again not elected due to the requirement for one-third female representation. This time, he did not receive a mandate before the dissolution of parliament in 2021.

==== Council of Europe (2018–20) ====
The Assembly of Kosovo had observer status at the Parliamentary Assembly of the Council of Europe (PACE) during Dreshaj's assembly term. He became a substitute member of Kosovo's delegation to the PACE on 22 January 2018 and served until 26 January 2020.

=== Deputy minister (2020–21) ===
The LDK and AAK formed a coalition government in June 2020, and Dreshaj was appointed as deputy minister of foreign affairs. After his appointment, he accused previous administrations of appointing unqualified delegates to various embassies of the Republic of Kosovo around the world. The LDK–AAK coalition soon lost its majority in the assembly, and a new election was called for February 2021. Dreshaj intended to be a candidate but ultimately withdrew from the contest. Vetëvendosje (VV) won the election by a landslide, and Dreshaj's term as deputy minister ended when the new administration was formed.

== Electoral record ==
=== Local (Istog) ===
2017 Kosovan local elections: Mayor of Istog
Candidate	Party	First round		Second round	
Candidate	Party	Votes	%	Votes	%
Haki Rugova (incumbent)	Democratic League of Kosovo	8,872	45.36	10,033	50.03
Gani Dreshaj	Alliance for the Future of Kosovo	6,970	35.63	10,019	49.97
Beqir Sadikaj	Democratic Party of Kosovo	1,644	8.40		
Agron Avdijaj	Levizja Vetëvendosje!	1,591	8.13		
Arif Elshani	Civic Initiative "Independent Initiative of Istog"	484	2.47		
Total		19,561	100.00	20,052	100.00
