= Mayor of Gjilan =

- Incumbent; Lutfi Haziri since 3 November 2013
- Member of: Gjilan Assembly
- Reports to: Gjilan Assembly
- Residence: No official residence
- Appointer: Electorate of Gjilan
- Term length: Four years (unlimited number of renewals)
- Precursor: Qemajl Mustafa
- Formation: 28 November 2000
- First holder: Ismajl Kurteshi
- Deputy: Rexhep Kadriu
- Website: kk.rks-gov.net/gjilan/President/President-profile.aspx

The Mayor of Gjilan is the head of the City of Gjilan (city in Republic of Kosovo). The mayor acts on behalf of the City, and performs an executive function in the City of Gjilan. The majority of population is Albanian, but there are also smaller communities including Bosniaks, Serbs, Romani and others. The surface of Gjilan is 392 km^{2}. Gjilan is known as the center of cultural, economical developments. Since 2013 the current mayor is Lutfi Haziri.

== Office ==
According to the current legislation, the mayor is elected along with members of the City Assembly at the direct secret ballot for the period of four years. The Mayor may not be a councilor of the City Assembly.

== List of mayors ==
#	Portrait	Name (Born-Died)	Term of office		Party	Term
1		Ismajl Kurteshi	28 October 2000	26 October 2002	Democratic Party of Kosovo	First
2		Lutfi Haziri (b. 1964)	26 October 2002	14 December 2007	Democratic League of Kosovo	First
3		Qemajl Mustafa (b. 1951)	14 December 2007	26 December 2013	Democratic Party of Kosovo	2 terms in a row
4		Lutfi Haziri (b. 1978)	26 December 2013	22 November 2021	Democratic League of Kosovo	Second
Source: KQZ
