= Valdete Idrizi =

Activist from Kosovo

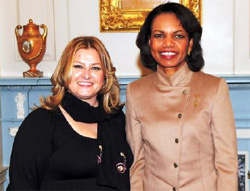
- Valdete Idrizi (left) with Secretary Condoleezza Rice, 2008
- Born: 27 June 1973 (age 52); Kosovska Mitrovica, SFR Yugoslavia
- Occupation: Engineer
- Years active: 2000s–present
- Known for: Women's rights activism
- Political party: Democratic Party of Kosovo
- Awards: 2008 International Women of Courage Award; 2009 Soroptimist International Peace Award

Valdete Idrizi (born 27 June 1973) is the executive director of the CiviKos platform (in 2017). She was the executive director of the NGO Community-Building Mitrovica, which she founded, and which works for peace and builds community in the Mitrovica region in northern Kosovo. For six years prior to 2008, Community-Building Mitrovica was the only organization in Mitrovica which encouraged reconciliation and rebuilding of relationships between ethnic Albanians and Serbs. Idrizi herself is an ethnic Albanian from Kosovo in North Mitrovica who lost her home in 1999 when the Serbs invaded. In 2008 her home was still occupied by Serbs. Community-Building Mitrovica has managed to arrange the return of some Serbs to their homes in Kosovo, for which Idrizi received death threats from Kosovar Albanian militants.

Idrizi received a 2008 International Women of Courage Award and the 2009 Soroptimist International Peace Award.

She was chosen as CiviKos Platform Executive Director in December 2011; CiviKos is an initiative of civil society organizations in Kosovo "aimed at creating an enabling environment for [the] cooperation of [the] formal civil society sector and the Government."
