= 2024 North Kosovo referendum =

Referendum on the dismissal of four mayors in North Kosovo

A referendum on the dismissal of four ethnic Albanian mayors of municipalities in Kosovo was held on 21 April 2024, in the region of North Kosovo with a majority Serb population. The municipalities where referendums for the replacement of mayors was held were: Zubin Potok, Zvečan, Leposavić, and North Mitrovica. For the referendum to succeed, a majority of registered voters had to vote for the replacement of the mayor in each municipality. The referendum came after a petition organized by citizens of municipalities in the north for the removal of 4 mayors in said municipalities. It was officially held, having been approved by Kosovo's Central Electoral Commission. It was invalid due to a boycott by Serbian voters.

== Background ==
Local elections were held in four Serb majority municipalities of Kosovo on 23 April 2023. Due to tensions prior to the organization of local elections, they were boycotted by the Srpska Lista and most of the Serb population. As a result of the boycott, four ethnically Albanian mayors were elected to office.

== Results ==
The referendum was boycotted by Serbian voters, while referendum rules require a turnout of 50% or more, ultimately causing it to fail. Only 253 out of 46,556 eligible voters in North Kosovo cast their ballots. The largest Serb political party in Kosovo, Serb List, called for boycott of the referendum as it accused of being undermined by a campaign of pressure and intimidation of local Serbs by the Kosovo government, accusations Pristina denied. The referendum also was not part of an initial deal between Pristina, Belgrade and international mediators aimed at resolving the standoff over governance in north Kosovo. Serb List said the mayors should have simply resigned before a new election.

2024 North Kosovo referendum
Choice	Votes	%
For	18	7.11
Against	235	92.89
Total	253	100.00
Total votes	253	–
Registered voters/turnout	46,556	0.54
Turnout needed		50.00
Source: ABC Newsyenisafak
