= Srđan Popović =

Kosovar-Serbian politician

- Срђан Поповић
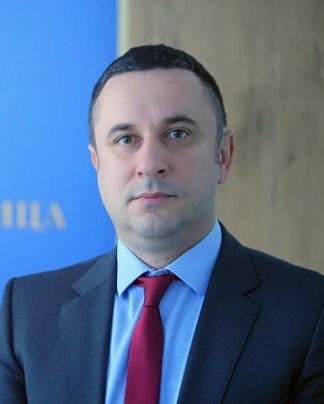
- Popović in 2019

Mayor of Gračanica
- In office 2017–2021

Member of the Assembly of Kosovo
- In office 2015–2017

Personal details
- Born: 16 September 1978 (age 48) Pristina, SAP Kosovo, SR Serbia, SFR Yugoslavia
- Party: Serb List
- Other political affiliations: Serbian Progressive Party
- Education: University of Priština

Srđan Popović (Serbian Cyrillic: Срђан Поповић, Albanian: Srgjan Popoviq; born 16 September 1978) is a Kosovar and Serbian politician who is currently serving as the mayor of Gračanica, a Serbian enclave in Kosovo since 2017.

== Biography ==
=== Early life and career ===
Popović was born in 1978 in Pristina which at that time was a part of the Socialist Federal Republic of Yugoslavia. He finished middle and high school in Pristina and graduated from the Faculty of Philosophy at the University of Priština.

During the Kosovo War he was a volunteer in the NGO Center for Peace and Tolerance and worked as a coordinator of humanitarian aid. After the war he worked for OSCE as an educator for the Serb members of the election committee. He also worked as a coordinator for the displaced people from the war and was active within the Serbian enclaves.

From 2008 to 2011, he was the Director of the Institute for the Protection of Cultural Monuments of Gračanica.

=== Political career ===
His first real political engament was in 2011 when he served as a political Adviser at the Ministry of Environment and Physical Planning in the Government of Kosovo. In September 2011, he was named as a new Director of the Office for Community Affairs and Senior Adviser to the Prime Minister.

From 2015 to 2017, after Velimir Rakić died, Popović replaced him as a member of the Assembly of Kosovo as a representative of the Serb List.

Popović was elected new Mayor of Gračanica after the 2017 Kosovan local elections in which he won 87.2% of the popular vote.
