= National Movement for the Liberation of Kosovo =

National Movement for the Liberation of Kosovo Lëvizja Kombëtare për Çlirimin e Kosovës
- Abbreviation: LKÇK
- Leader: Avni Klinaku; Bahri Fazliu; Salih Mustafa
- Founded: 25 May 1993
- Dissolved: 23 May 2011
- Split from: People's Movement of Kosovo
- Merged into: Movement for Unification
- Succeeded by: Movement for Integration and Unification
- Headquarters: Pristina
- Ideology: Marxism–Leninism; Hoxhaism
- Political position: Far-left
- Colours: Red and Black

The National Movement for the Liberation of Kosovo (Albanian: Lëvizja Kombëtare për Çlirimin e Kosovës, LKÇK) was a radical political movement in Kosovo, as well as a political party after the Kosovo War.

== History ==
The party was founded as an underground movement on 25 May 1993 in Pristina by a faction of the dissident Marxist-Leninist organization People's Movement of Kosovo (LPK), the founding base of the Kosovo Liberation Army (KLA) guerilla movement. It would derive its name from one of the main core marxist organizations that formed LPK, National Liberation Movement of Kosovo and other Albanian Regions (Albanian: Lëvizja Nacional-Çlirimtare e Kosovës dhe të Viseve tjetra Shqiptare në Jugosllavi, LNÇKVSHJ), founded in February 1978 by Metush Krasniqi, Jusuf Gërvalla and Sabri Novosella. Just like LPK, the LKÇK faction advocated the concept of Greater Albania and military action against the Milošević administration, but contrary to the pacifist policies of the dominant Democratic League of Kosovo (LDK) and what it perceived as similar tendencies to moderation inside the LPK.

After imprisonment of Avni Klinaku by Yugoslavian authorities, Bahri Fazliu would take charge as the leader. Fazliu would join Kosovo Liberation Army during the war and fall on 7 May 1998, somewhere in the former border between Albania and Yugoslavia. He would later receive the title "Hero of Kosovo" (Albanian: "Hero i Kosovës").

=== Political party ===
The LKÇK was initially part of the Alliance for the Future of Kosovo, despite the latter's centre-right political position. At the legislative elections held on 24 October 2004, the party boycotted the elections. As one of the most radical political organizations in Kosovo, the party opposed the Ahtisaari plan and the current presence of the United Nations and European Union in the region, advocating total independence for Kosovo. The party, together with a number of its former leaders, is blacklisted by the U.S. Department of Treasury.

In the parliamentary elections of 2001, the party won 1 out of 120 seats in the Assembly. In the parliamentary elections of 2007, the party won no seats.

=== Aftermath ===
LKÇK would later transform into Movement for Integration and Unification, (Albanian: Lëvizja për Integrim dhe Bashkim, LIB), with Smajl Latifi as a leader followed by Fadil Fazliu after his resignation, and Movement for Unification (Albanian: Lëvizja për Bashkim, LB) of Avni Klinaku, until on 23 May 2011 when two parties merged in one, going on with the Movement for Unification name.

== See also ==
- Albanian nationalism
- Albanians in Kosovo
- Kosovo War
- List of Kosovo Albanians
- People's Movement of Kosovo
- Movement for Unification
- Alliance for the Future of Kosovo
- Ahtisaari Plan
