= Tirana Times =

Weekly English language newspaper in Albania

- Type: Weekly newspaper
- Editor-in-chief: Jerina Zaloshnja
- Founded: 2005; 20 years ago
- Political alignment: Independent
- Language: English
- Headquarters: Tirana
- Website: www.tiranatimes.com

Tirana Times is a weekly newspaper published in English and is headquartered in Tirana, Albania.

== History and profile ==
Tirana Times is the first weekly English newspaper in Albania. The paper was established in 2005. The weekly provides news on politics, business and economy, opinion, features, sports, arts and culture with a special focus on Albania and the Balkans. It has an independent political leaning, and is published in partnership with the Albanian Institute for International Studies, Albania's top think tank. As of 2015 Jerina Zaloshnja was the editor in chief. Andi Balla served as the executive editor of the weekly.

The paper launched a website in 2006 which is updated daily which was the 12th most visited news portal in Albania in 2013.

== See also ==
- List of newspapers in Albania
