= Aleksandar Jablanović =

Kosovo Serb politician

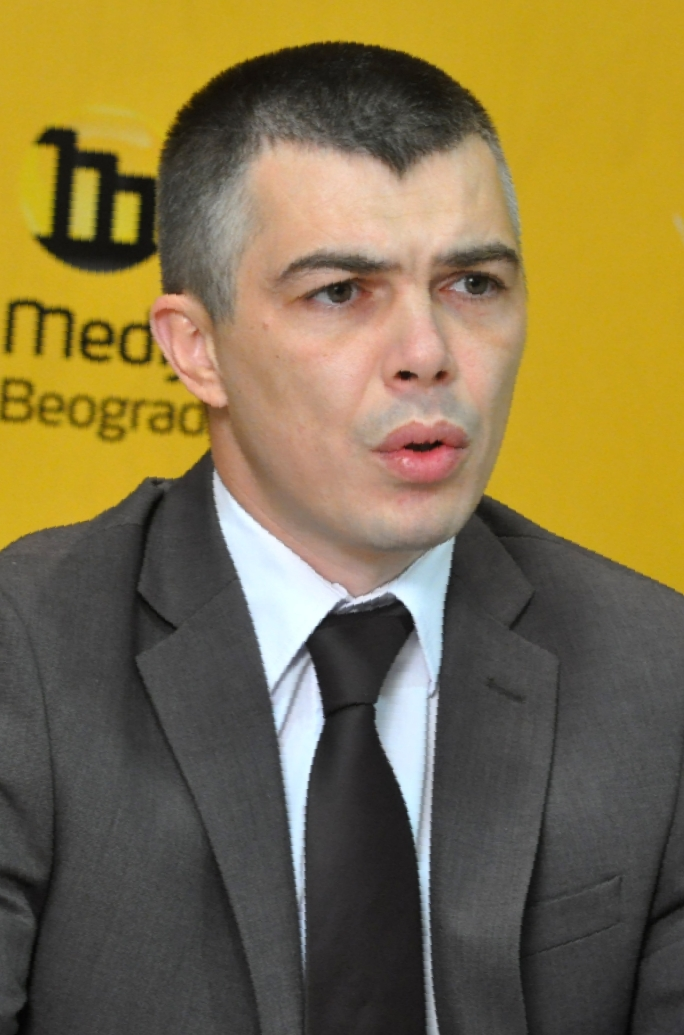

Personal details
- Born: Aleksandar Jablanović; 25 September 1980 (age 45) Kosovska Mitrovica, SAP Kosovo, SR Serbia, SFR Yugoslavia
- Party: Party of Kosovo Serbs
- Spouse: Kristina
- Children: Anastasija & Katarina

Aleksandar Jablanović (Serbian Cyrillic: Александар Јаблановић; Albanian: Aleksandër Jabllanoviq; born 25 September 1980) is a Kosovo Serb politician, and the Minister of Communities and Returns in the Republic of Kosovo from 9 December 2014, until 3 February 2015. He formerly served as the Deputy Mayor of the Municipality of Leposavić, Member of the Serbian National Assembly and the State Secretary in the Ministry for Labour, Employment, Veteran and Social Affairs. In May 2017 he founded the Party of Kosovo Serbs (Partija Kosovskih Srba – PKS).

On 6 January 2015 a group of Albanians stoned and blocked the way for a bus driving 40 displaced Serbs to Christmas mass in the Orthodox church in Gjakova, the same having been done the previous Christmas; Jablanović issued a statement, calling the attackers "savages" (divljaci). Isa Mustafa said that he would look into if the comment had broken the Constitution of the Republic of Kosovo. The Kosovo press reported that he had made the comment directly to the Thirrjet e nënave (Mothers of Kosovo War victims); Thirrjet e nënave took part in the protests outside the church but it is unclear if they had taken part in the stoning of the bus. The event saw a culmination with the 2015 Kosovo protests. Most opposition and citizens demanded his resignation. He formally apologised for his statements. On 3 February 2015, it was announced that he had been dismissed from the cabinet.
