= Lutfi Haziri =

Kosovar politician (born 1969)

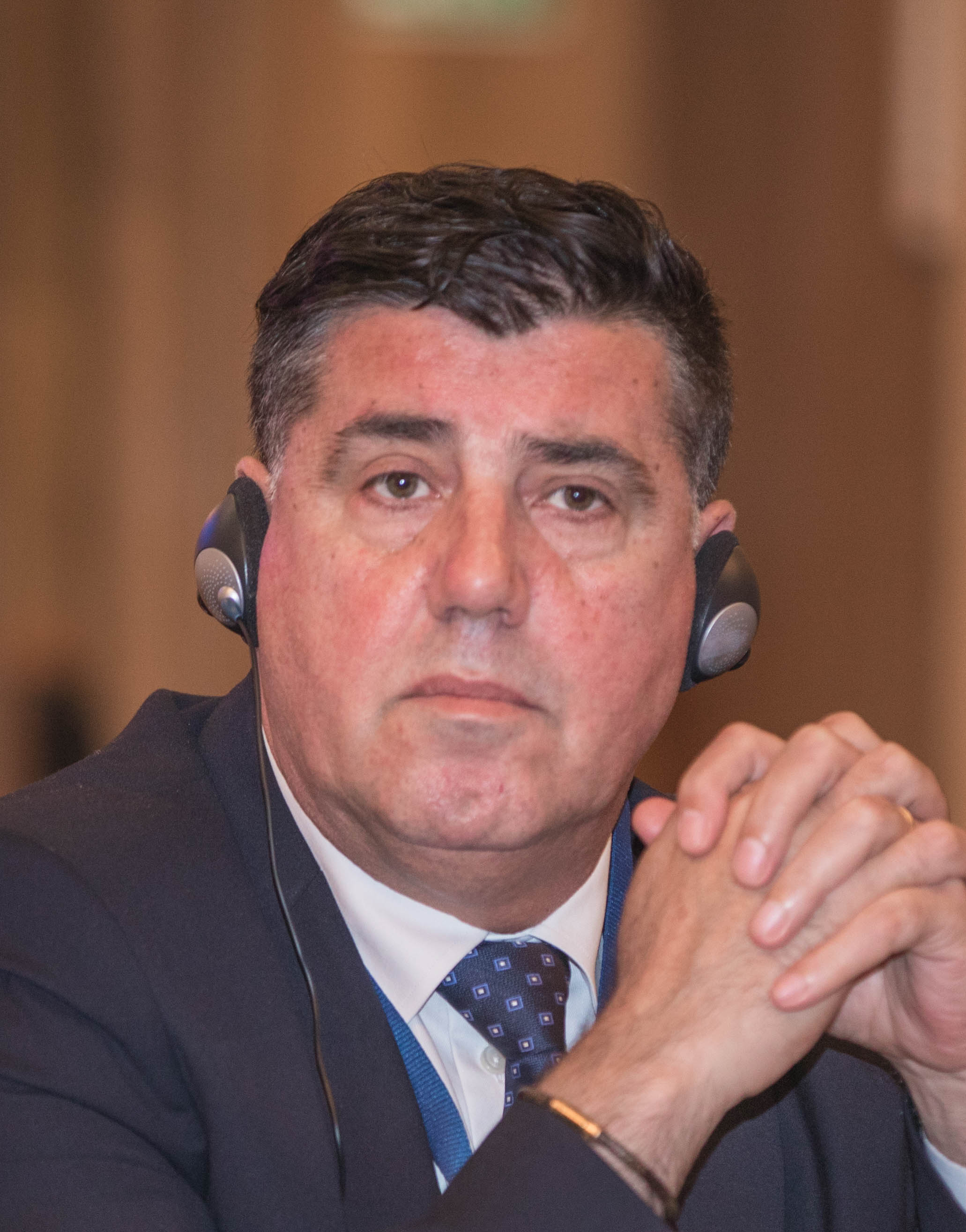
- Haziri in May, 2018

Mayor of Gjilan
- In office January 2014 – November 2021
- Preceded by: Qemajl Mustafa
- Succeeded by: Alban Hyseni

Personal details
- Born: 8 November 1969 (age 56) Gjilan, SFR Yugoslavia (modern day Kosovo)
- Party: Democratic League of Kosovo (LDK)
- Spouse: Mirvete Bajrami
- Children: Kenga Haziri, Lotina Haziri, Mimas Haziri, Lumi Haziri
- Occupation: Musician, politician, deputy

Lutfi Haziri (born 8 November 1969 in Gjilan, Yugoslavia, now Kosovo) is the deputy chairman of the Democratic League of Kosovo and former mayor of Gjilan. He is a former deputy prime minister and minister of Kosovo for Culture, Youth, Sports and Non-residential Affairs. He headed the delegation of Kosovo in the talks on the political status of Kosovo with Serbia in Vienna, Austria in February 2006.

== Life and politics ==
Lutfi Haziri was born on 8 November 1969 in Gjilan, then Yugoslavia, now Kosovo.

Haziri was part of the students' leadership structures within the University of Pristina during the 1990s. Since 1990, Haziri was part of the structures of the Ministry of Defence of the unrecognised Republic of Kosova and in charge of numerous functions within the then existing parallel structures in Kosovo.

In March 1990, Haziri was elected President of the Youth Forum of the Gjilan branch of the Democratic League of Kosovo (LDK) and served as its president until 1997. In 1997, Haziri was elected as Deputy President of the LDK branch in Gjilan as well as member of the General Council of LDK in Pristina. He remained in both functions until 2000.

In October 1998, Haziri was arrested and imprisoned on charges of leadership of the Kosovo Liberation Army (KLA-UÇK) structures in the Karadaku zone (Gjilan). After his release in August 1999, Haziri became Deputy Mayor of the municipality of Gjilan, whereas in November 2000 he became mayor of the same municipality. He remained in this position until December 2004.

In June 2001, he was also elected chairman of the Association of Kosovo Municipalities. In this function, Haziri was also chairman of the Kosovo Municipal Delegation to the Congress of Local and Regional Governance in Strasbourg (Council of Europe).

Haziri obtained a management diploma of the Organization for Security and Co-operation in Europe, certificates of Georgetown University, University of Colorado, a diploma from the United States Institute of Peace (USIP) as well as other recognitions from local and international organisations.

On 3 December 2004, Haziri was elected as Kosovo's first Minister for Local Government. In 2006, he was a prominent member of the Kosovar Albanian delegation in UN-led talks on the political status of Kosovo with Serbia.

Haziri stepped down from federal politics in 2013 to run for the mayorship of Gjilan again, which he won. In December 2017, he was re-elected. In the 2021 race, he lost the mayorship to Alban Hyseni.

In 2021, Haziri became the deputy chairman of the LDK and chairman of its branch in Gjilan.

Haziri is married to Mirvete Bajrami, from the Përlepnica village of Gjilan originally, with three daughters, Kenga, Lotina and Mimas and a son Lumi. His daughter Lotina is in a relationship with Kosovo Albanian rapper Mozzik.

== See also ==
- Government of Kosovo
