= Albanian Institute for International Studies =

Albanian think tank

- Formation: 1997; 29 years ago
- Type: Research and policy think tank
- Location: Tirana, Albania
- Chairman: Albert Rakipi
- Website: www.aiis-albania.org

The Albanian Institute for International Studies is a think tank based in Tirana, Albania. It is a non-governmental, non-profit research and policy think tank.

== History and profile ==
AIIS was launched by Albanian academics and analysts in 1997 and registered in 2002. Its research and projects focuses on three main areas: European integration, democratization process, and Balkan developments. Tirana Times is the official media partner of AIIS. In addition, AIIS publishes several studies and organizes events in accordance with its study focus. Its analyses have been employed by Albanian policy-makers and international partners in the fields of security studies, democracy, Euro-Atlantic integration and regional cooperation.

AIIS is governed by a board of directors. The AIIS chairman is [Albert Rakipi] The staff of AIIS include Albanian and international scholars.
