= People's Movement of Kosovo =

People's Movement of Kosovo Lëvizja Popullore e Kosovës
- Abbreviation: LPK
- Founders: Nuhi Berisha; Ali Ahmeti
- Founded: 17 February 1982
- Dissolved: 23 July 2013
- Merged into: Democratic League of Kosovo (1990); Democratic Party of Kosovo (1999); Vetëvendosje (2013)
- Newspaper: Zëri i Kosovës
- Ideology: Before 1990: Self-determination; Albanian nationalism; Left-wing nationalism; Kosovar–Albanian unionism; Marxism–Leninism; Hoxhaism; After 1990: Self-determination; Social conservatism; Liberal conservatism
- Political position: Before 1990: Left-wing to far-left; After 1990: Centre-right
- Colours: Red, black and yellow

The People's Movement of Kosovo (Albanian: Lëvizja Popullore e Kosovës - LPK) was a political party in Kosovo active after the Kosovo War, having originally been founded as a political movement of Albanian nationalists in 1982. Despite participating in several elections in autonomous Kosovo, its pre-war existence was its most historically significant period. Historically, its support and membership came from Albanian diaspora, especially within Switzerland and Germany, originating mainly from former Yugoslav republics.

== History ==
=== Ideology ===
The LPK was formed in the early 1980s, during the turmoil which would bring the Albanian population of Yugoslavia to wider attention. During the 1981 protests in Kosovo, protesters demanded that Kosovo become a republic within the Socialist Federal Republic of Yugoslavia.

The movement was crystallized on 17 February 1982, in Switzerland, as a Marxist-Leninist union of Albanian diaspora organizations with support and sympathy for/from the communist regime of Enver Hoxha, struggling for the rights of Albanians throughout Yugoslavia and unification with Albania, originally named the Movement for the Albanian Republic in Yugoslavia (Albanian: Levizje per Republiken Shqiptare ne Jugosllavi, LRSHJ), to be renamed later as PMK.

The LPK's ideology was left-wing nationalism. Peter Schwarz, while talking about Kosovo Liberation Army (UÇK) in "Kosovo and the crisis in the Atlantic Alliance", (1 September 1999), states: "In Germany a ban was in the course of being implemented against the core of the party, the Enver Hoxha-oriented KPM (Kosovo People's Movement)". Robert Elsie states in his Historical Dictionary of Kosovo, 2011 that: "It was initially Marxist-oriented, seeing Kosovo's salvation in Albania and thus supporting the regime of Enver Hoxha".

=== Foundation ===
The three core organizations that constituted the LPK were the Marxist–Leninist Communist Party of Albanians in Yugoslavia (Albanian: Partia Komuniste Marksiste-Leniniste e Shqiptarëve në Jugosllavi - PKMLSHJ), the National Liberation Movement of Kosovo and other Albanian Regions (Albanian: Lëvizjes Nacionalçlirimtare të Kosovës dhe Viseve të tjera Shqiptare - LNÇKVSHJ)^{[b]} and the Marxist–Leninist Organization of Kosovo (Albanian: Organizata Marksiste Leniniste e Kosovës - OMLK).^{[c]} The negotiations had started on late November 1981, failing for the first time in Istanbul between Sabri Novosella and Abdullah Prapashtica despite the support of Albanian Ambassador in Turkey. The movement's platform would be based on that of the more moderate PKMLSHJ, shifted aimed for an Albanian Republic within Yugoslavia, while the other two organizations had the goal of unifying Kosovo with Albania.

There is some controversy regarding the exact identity of the founders of the LPK. One of its founders, Abdullah Prapashtica, has stated that the movement's executive committee included Osman Osmani, Faton Topalli, Ibrahim Kelmendi, Sabri Novosella, Jusuf Gërvalla, Bardhosh Gërvalla, Xhafer Durmishi, Kadri Zeka, Hasan Mala, Xhafer Shatri, and Nuhi Sylejmani (joining after the execution of Gërvalla brothers), while others like Emrush Xhemajli give slightly different names and circumstances.

=== Activity until 1998 ===
The LPK remained active throughout Europe and continuously sponsored and supported insurgents, propaganda, and activities inside Yugoslavia, as well as lobbying for the Albanian national cause. Many would be imprisoned or killed by Yugoslav authorities. On 17 January 1982, Jusuf Gërvalla, Kadri Zeka and Bardhosh Gërvalla were executed in Untergruppenbach, West Germany from Yugoslav secret service secret agents. Two other members, Rexhep Mala and Nuhi Berisha died in a shoot-out with Yugoslav police forces in a Pristina neighbourhood (today "Kodra e Trimave") on 11 January 1984. On 2 November 1989, Afrim Zhitia and Fahri Fazliu would die in a similar shoot-out (from 12:45 till around 19:00) after being surrounded by Serbian police in the "Kodra e Diellit" neighborhood of Pristina.

Despite the difficulties, the LPK would diligently continue to be the main representative of the Albanian resistance against Serbian rule until December 1989, when Ibrahim Rugova and other intellectuals in Kosovo founded the Democratic League of Kosovo (Albanian: Lidhja Demokratike e Kosovës) and the LPK united with them on the 1 October 1990, and became a subgroup of the LDK, a centre right, capitalistic, moderate party.

=== 1998–2001 ===
The LPK would establish the core of what would become known as the Kosovo Liberation Army (UÇK), following later with the Liberation Army of Preševo, Medveđa and Bujanovac (UÇPMB) in Preševo Valley, the National Liberation Army (UÇK) in Macedonia, as well as the Front of Albanian National Unity (FBKSH) of Gafurr Adili. Many members including most of the leadership would actively join the war, including Adem Jashari, Sami Lushtaku, Fatmir Limaj, Fehmi Lladrovci, Ramush Haradinaj, Azem Syla, Adem Grabovci, Harun Aliu, Jakup Krasniqi, Ali Ahmeti, and Hashim Thaçi.

=== Afterwards ===
On 14 May 1999, most of the LPK membership would support the creation of Party for the Democratic Progress of Kosovo (Partia për Progres Demokratik e Kosovës) as a political wing of the Kosovo Liberation Army after the war, renamed on 21 May 2000 as Democratic Party of Kosovo (Albanian: Partia Demokratike e Kosovës, PDK) led by Hashim Thaçi. Many others would join other political entities that emerged into Kosovo's political arena, i.e. the Socialist Party of Kosovo (Albanian: Partia Socialiste e Kosovës), National Movement for the Liberation of Kosovo (Albanian: Lëvizja Kombëtare për Çlirimin e Kosovës, LKÇK), Vetëvendosje, etc. The fraction that did not support these changes continued political activity under the same original name (Lëvizja Popullore e Kosovës).

In the parliamentary elections of 2001 and 2004, the party won 1 out of 120 seats in the Assembly.

On 23 July 2013, what remained from the LPK merged into Vetëvendosje.

== See also ==
- Albanians in Kosovo
- Socialist Autonomous Province of Kosovo
- Kosovo War
- List of Kosovo Albanians
- National Movement for the Liberation of Kosovo
- Democratic League of Kosovo
- Democratic Party of Kosovo
- Vetëvendosje

== Notes ==
b.	Formerly known as the Movement for an Albanian Socialist Republic in Yugoslavia (Albanian: Lëvizja për Republikën Socialiste Shqiptare në Jugosllavi - LRSSHJ)

c.	Formed in 1970 as the Kosovo Revolutionary Group (Albanian: Grupi Revolucionar i Kosovës - GRK), final name and program were established after joining the LPK on 15 May 1982.
